= National Register of Historic Places listings in Bertie County, North Carolina =

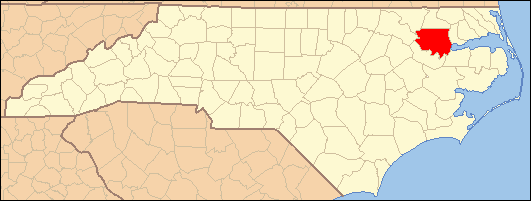

This list includes properties and districts listed on the National Register of Historic Places in Bertie County, North Carolina. Click the "Map of all coordinates" link to the right to view an online map of all properties and districts with latitude and longitude coordinates in the table below.

== Current listings ==
This National Park Service list is complete through NPS recent listings posted March 14, 2025.

	Name on the Register	Image	Date listed	Location	City or town	Description
1	Ashland		April 18, 2003 (#03000268)	NC 45, 0.25 miles (0.40 km) north of the junction with NC 1360; 36°05′22″N 76°46′11″W	Ashland	
2	Bertie County Courthouse	Bertie County Courthouse	May 10, 1979 (#79001662)	King and Dundee Sts. 35°59′50″N 76°56′49″W	Windsor	
3	Bertie Memorial Hospital	Bertie Memorial Hospital	June 22, 2004 (#04000647)	401 Sterlingworth St. 36°00′00″N 76°57′13″W	Windsor	
4	Broad Creek Block Ships		August 24, 2018 (#100002797)	Address Restricted	Plymouth	
5	Colerain Historic District		April 3, 2020 (#100004797)	North & West Academy Sts., Britton St., Cedar St., Glover St., North & South Main Sts., East & West River Sts. & Winton St. 36°12′03″N 76°46′06″W	Colerain	
6	Elmwood		January 15, 2003 (#02001710)	637 Avoca Farm Rd. 36°00′07″N 76°43′35″W	Merry Hill	
7	Elmwood		June 8, 1982 (#82003431)	West of Windsor on SR 1101; 36°00′26″N 76°58′46″W	Windsor	
8	Freeman Hotel	Freeman Hotel	September 9, 1982 (#82003432)	York and Granville Sts. 35°59′59″N 76°56′43″W	Windsor	
9	Garrett-White House		June 28, 1982 (#82003425)	Northeast of the junction of NC 42 and Bud Taylor Rd., west of Colerain; 36°12′45″N 76°52′58″W	Colerain	
10	The Hermitage		June 8, 1982 (#82003427)	North of Merry Hill; 36°05′12″N 76°44′00″W	Merry Hill	
11	Hope Plantation	Hope Plantation	April 17, 1970 (#70000441)	4 miles (6.4 km) northwest of Windsor, off NC 308; 36°01′43″N 77°01′03″W	Windsor	
12	Jordan House		August 26, 1971 (#71000569)	South of Windsor on SR 1522; 35°53′28″N 76°57′25″W	Windsor	
13	King House	King House	August 26, 1971 (#71000570)	Northwest of Windsor off NC 308; 36°01′49″N 77°01′09″W	Windsor	
14	King-Freeman-Speight House		December 2, 1982 (#82001280)	West of Republican on NC 308; 36°04′38″N 77°05′42″W	Republican	
15	William H. Lee House	William H. Lee House	April 16, 2012 (#12000213)	246 Farm Rd. 36°08′33″N 77°08′29″W	Lewiston	
16	Liberty Hall		June 8, 1982 (#82003433)	Off SR 1108; 35°57′54″N 77°02′06″W	Windsor	
17	Oaklana		April 15, 1982 (#82003429)	Northeast of Roxobel off SR 1249; 36°13′10″N 77°13′22″W	Roxobel	
18	Pineview		June 28, 1982 (#82003430)	Off SR 1249; 36°11′43″N 77°14′00″W	Roxobel	
19	Rhodes Site (31BR90)		August 28, 1986 (#86001955)	Address Restricted	Hamilton	
20	Rosefield	Rosefield	August 26, 1982 (#82003434)	212 W. Gray St. 35°59′39″N 76°56′55″W	Windsor	
21	Scotch Hall		April 29, 1982 (#82003428)	East of Merry Hill on SR 1511; 35°58′26″N 76°42′29″W	Merry Hill	
22	St. Frances Methodist Church	St. Frances Methodist Church	April 29, 1982 (#82003426)	Off NC 308; 36°07′24″N 77°10′40″W	Lewiston	
23	Windsor Historic District	Windsor Historic District	July 29, 1991 (#86003146)	Roughly bounded by York, Water, Sutton, and Elmo Sts. 35°59′49″N 76°56′44″W	Windsor	
24	Woodbourne		August 26, 1971 (#71000568)	West of Roxobel on SR 1139; 36°11′15″N 77°15′54″W	Roxobel	
25	Woodville Historic District		August 28, 1998 (#98001112)	Roughly along NC 11; 36°06′13″N 77°10′59″W	Lewiston Woodville	

== See also ==
- National Register of Historic Places listings in North Carolina
- List of National Historic Landmarks in North Carolina
