= Woodville =

Woodville may refer to one of the following:

== Places ==
=== Australia ===
==== New South Wales ====
- Woodville, New South Wales

==== South Australia ====
- Woodville, South Australia
  - Woodville railway station, Adelaide
- Woodville North, South Australia
- Woodville South, South Australia
- Woodville West, South Australia
- Woodville Gardens, South Australia
- Woodville Park, South Australia

=== Canada ===
- Woodville, Ontario
- Woodville, Newfoundland and Labrador
- Woodville, Nova Scotia

=== Malaysia ===
- Woodville, Penang, a colonial-era mansion in George Town

=== New Zealand ===
- Woodville, New Zealand
- Woodville (New Zealand electorate), a former parliamentary electorate, 1887–1890

=== South Africa ===
- Woodville, Western Cape

=== United Kingdom ===
- Woodville, Derbyshire, England

=== United States ===
- Woodville, Alabama
- Woodville, California
- Dogtown, Marin County, California, formerly Woodville
- Woodleaf, Yuba County, California, formerly Woodville
- Woodville, Florida, largest municipality with this name
- Woodville, Georgia
- Woodville (Milledgeville, Georgia), listed on the NRHP in Georgia
- Woodville (Winfield, Georgia), listed on the NRHP in Georgia
- Woodville, Idaho
- Woodville, Indiana (disambiguation)
  - Woodville, Henry County, Indiana
  - Woodville, Porter County, Indiana
- Woodville, Kentucky
- Woodville, Maine
- Woodville, Massachusetts, a village within the town of Hopkinton
- Woodville, Bay County, Michigan
- Woodville, Newaygo County, Michigan
- Woodville Township, Waseca County, Minnesota
- Woodville, Mississippi
  - Woodville Historic District (Woodville, Mississippi), listed on the NRHP in Mississippi
- Woodville, Missouri
- Woodville, New York (disambiguation)
  - Woodhaven, Queens, New York, formerly Woodville
  - Woodville, Jefferson County, New York
  - Woodville, Ontario County, New York
- Woodville, North Carolina (disambiguation)
  - Woodville, Bertie County, North Carolina
  - Woodville, Perquimans County, North Carolina
  - Woodville, Surry County, North Carolina
- Lewiston Woodville, North Carolina
  - Woodville Historic District (Lewiston Woodville, North Carolina), listed on the NRHP in North Carolina
- Woodville, Ohio, a village in Sandusky County
- Woodville, Clermont County, Ohio
- Woodville, Oklahoma
- Woodville (Heidelberg, Pennsylvania), a house that is a National Historic Landmark
- Woodville, Tennessee
- Woodville, Texas
- Woodville, Virginia
- Woodville, Wisconsin, a village in St. Croix County, Wisconsin
- Woodville, Calumet County, Wisconsin, a town

== People ==
- Woodville (surname)

== See also ==
- Woodsville (disambiguation)
- Woodville Historic District (disambiguation)
- Woodville School (disambiguation)
- Woodville Township (disambiguation)
