= List of Highway Historical Markers in Bertie County, North Carolina =

Bertie County, North Carolina is in District A of the NC Highway Historical Marker Program, and has nine markers as of July 2020. The marker program was created by the North Carolina General Assembly in 1935. Since that time over 1600 black and silver markers have been placed along numbered North Carolina highways throughout the state. Each one has a brief description of a fact relevant to state history, and is located near a place related to that fact. North Carolina's counties are divided into seventeen districts for the highway marker program. Each marker is assigned an identifier that begins with the letter of the district, followed by a number.

List of North Carolina Highway Historical Markers in Bertie County, NC
Number	Title	Location	Text	Year Erected
A-2	Indian Woods	US 17/13 south of Windsor	"Reservation established in 1717 for Tuscaroras remaining in N.C. after war of 1711–1713. Sold, 1828. Five miles N.W."	1936
A-7	David Stone	NC 308 (Sterlingworth Street) at US 13 Bypass in Windsor.	"Governor, 1808–10; U.S. Senator; Congressman. "Hope," his home, stands 4 miles northwest."	1936
A-10	Salmon Creek and Eden House: Seedbed of the Colony	US 17 at Chowan River bridge east of Windsor	"Along the banks of the Chowan River and Salmon Creek, the seeds were planted for the colony and state of North Carolina. From these roots in the 1600s emerged the refined plantation life of the ruling colonial gentry in the 1700s, made possible by the displacement of Indians and with slave labor. The earliest settlers in this region, largely natives of the British Isles, transplanted their folkways, building techniques, agricultural methods, and adventurous spirit to these shores..." [Note: This is a large, non-standard marker with additional text and a map.]	2000
A-41	William Blount	US 17 (King Street) at Gray Street in Windsor	"Member of Continental Congress, signer of the Federal Constitution, governor S.W. Territory, Senator from Tennessee. Birthplace 1/5 mi. S.W."	1951
A-48	Roanoke River	US 17/13 at Roanoke River bridge	"Early channel of trade, its valley long an area of plantations. Frequent floods until 1952; since controlled by Kerr Dam. Old name was 'Moratuck.'"	1954
A-49	'Scotch Hall'	US 17 at NC 45 south of Taylors Store	"Plantation setting for the novel “Bertie” by George H. Throop (1851), tutor in the family of Geo. W. Capehart. House built 1838 is 8 mi. S.E."	1959
A-57	Naval Battle, 1864	NC 45 at Batchelor Bay Drive southeast of Windsor	"The Confederate ironclad ram Albemarle, led by Capt. J.W. Cooke, crossed Batchelor's Bay, May 5, 1864, and fought seven Union warships 15 mi. E."	1962
A-74	'Windsor Castle'	NC 308 (Sterlingworth Street) at Watson Street in Windsor	"Built 1858 by Patrick H. Winston, Jr. Birthplace of sons George T., educator; Francis D., lt. gov., 1905–1909; & Robert W., writer. 100 yards east."	1989
A-91	Father Aaron Bazemore	NC 308 (350 Governors Road) northwest of Windsor	"African American pastor. He founded in 1911 St. John, the first Church of God in Christ ministry in N.C. Grave 100 ft. W."	2018
