= George Throop =

George Throop may refer to:

- George Throop (baseball) (born 1950), former Major League Baseball pitcher
- George B. Throop (1793–1854), American lawyer and politician from New York and Michigan
- George H. Throop (1818–1896), American novelist and educator
- George R. Throop (1882–1949), chancellor of Washington University
