= Woodville, Australia =

Woodville, Australia may refer to one of the following places:

- Woodville, New South Wales, a rural suburb in the Hunter Region
- Woodville, South Australia, a suburb of Adelaide
  - Woodville railway station, Adelaide

== See also ==
- Woodville (disambiguation)
