= Woodville Historic District =

Woodville Historic District may refer to:

- Woodville Historic District (Woodville, Mississippi), listed on the NRHP in Mississippi
- Woodville Historic District (Lewiston Woodville, North Carolina), listed on the NRHP in North Carolina
