= Woodville, Indiana =

Woodville, Indiana may refer to one of the following places:

- Woodville, Henry County, Indiana
- Woodville, Porter County, Indiana

== See also ==
- Woodville (disambiguation)
