= Woodville, New York =

Woodville, New York may refer to:

- Woodhaven, Queens, New York, (variant name: Woodville)
- Woodville, Jefferson County, New York
- Woodville, Ontario County, New York
