= Tootie Robbins =

American football player (1958–2020)

No. 63, 73
- Position: Offensive tackle

Personal information
- Born: June 2, 1958; Windsor, North Carolina, U.S.
- Died: August 2, 2020 (aged 62); Chandler, Arizona, U.S.
- Listed height: 6 ft 5 in (1.96 m)
- Listed weight: 303 lb (137 kg)

Career information
- High school: Bertie (Windsor, North Carolina)
- College: East Carolina
- NFL draft: 1982: 4th round, 90th overall pick

Career history
- St.Louis/Phoenix Cardinals (1982–1991); Green Bay Packers (1992); New Orleans Saints (1993)*; Green Bay Packers (1993)
- * Offseason or practice squad member only

Awards and highlights
- PFWA All-Rookie Team (1982); Second-team All-American (1981)

Career NFL statistics
- Games: 159
- Games Started: 147
- Fumble recoveries: 4
- Stats at Pro Football Reference

James Elbert Robbins (June 2, 1958 – August 2, 2020) was an American professional football offensive tackle in the National Football League (NFL) from 1982 to 1993.

== Life and career ==
A native of North Carolina, Robbins attended Bertie High School in Windsor, North Carolina. He then played college football at East Carolina. He was selected by the Associated Press (AP) as a first-team interior lineman on the 1981 All-South Independent football team. He also received second-team honors from the AP on its 1981 All-America team.

He was selected by the St. Louis Cardinals in the fourth round of the 1982 NFL draft and played at right tackle for the team from 1982 to 1991, following the team when it moved to Phoenix in 1988. During his time with the Cardinals, he started 122 games, including a streak of 32 consecutive games.

In January 1992, the Green Bay Packers acquired Robbins from the Cardinals in exchange for a future draft pick. He started 26 games for the Packers during the 1992 and 1993 seasons. Prior to the 1994 season, the Packers asked Robbins to take a pay cut from $1.5 million to $250,000. Rather than accept the pay cut, Robbins at age 36 announced his retirement in September 1994.

Robbins died from COVID-19 in Chandler, Arizona, on August 2, 2020, at age 62, during the COVID-19 pandemic in Arizona.
