= Lawrence Academy (North Carolina) =

Location
- 148 Avoca Farm Road; Merry Hill, North Carolina 27957; United States; 36°00′38″N 76°46′07″W

Information
- Type: Private
- Motto: A Tradition of Excellence
- Established: 1968 (58 years ago)
- CEEB code: 340174
- Headmaster: Katrina Ford
- Grades: Pre-K–12
- Enrollment: 267 (2010–2011)
- Campus size: 49 acres (20 ha)
- Colors: Green and Gold
- Athletics: North Carolina Independent Schools Athletic Association (NCISAA)
- Newspaper: The Shield
- Website: lawrenceacademy.org

Lawrence Academy is a private school located at 148 Avoca Farm Road in Merry Hill, North Carolina. Lawrence Academy serves grades Pre-K though 12. It is one of four high schools in Bertie County, North Carolina. The Headmaster is Katrina Ford. Lawrence Academy's enrollment as of 2010 is 268 students. Its high school enrollment (grades 9–12) is 96.

The school was founded in 1968 as a segregation academy in response to the court ordered racial integration of public schools. As of 2014, the school's enrollment is 98% white, whereas Bertie County is 62% black.
