= George Outlaw =

American politician

Member of the U.S. House of Representatives from North Carolina's 2nd district
- In office January 19, 1825 – March 3, 1825
- Preceded by: Hutchins Gordon Burton
- Succeeded by: Willis Alston

Personal details
- Born: October 25, 1771 near Windsor, North Carolina, British America
- Died: August 15, 1825 (aged 53) Windsor, North Carolina, U.S.
- Resting place: Windsor, North Carolina, U.S.
- Party: Democratic-Republican
- Relatives: David Outlaw (cousin)
- Profession: Politician

George Outlaw (October 25, 1771 – August 15, 1825) was a U.S. Congressman from North Carolina in 1825.

Outlaw, born near Windsor, North Carolina, in Bertie County, was educated by private teachers and in the common schools. He engaged in agricultural and mercantile pursuits and was elected to the North Carolina House of Commons for a term in 1796 to 1797. He rose to the North Carolina Senate, serving in 1802 from 1806 to 1808 from 1810 to 1814, 1817, 1821, and 1822, where he was that body's speaker in 1812, 1813, and 1814.

Following the resignation of Rep. Hutchins Burton, Outlaw was sent to the 18th U.S. Congress in a special election; he served for less than two months in Congress, from January 19, 1825, to March 3, 1825. Outlaw was defeated in his campaign for re-election by Willis Alston in a three-way race. Alston, who had served previously from 1799 to 1815, criticized Outlaw's vote for William H. Crawford in the contingent presidential election of 1825. Outlaw's vote reflected the vote of the 2d Congressional District (which had voted Crawford 1,516 to Jackson 957), but the voters agreed with Alston and elected him over Outlaw by a 42-31% margin (with an Adams supporter winning 27%). Afterwards, he resumed agricultural and mercantile pursuits and died in Windsor in 1825, where he is buried in his family cemetery.

Outlaw was the cousin of Rep. David Outlaw.

U.S. House of Representatives
Preceded by Hutchins Gordon Burton	Member of the U.S. House of Representatives from North Carolina's 2nd congressional district 1825	Succeeded by Willis Alston
