= Woodville School =

Woodville School may refer to:

- Woodville School (Wakefield, Massachusetts), listed on the NRHP in Massachusetts
- Woodville School (Ordinary, Virginia), listed on the NRHP in Virginia
