= Republican, North Carolina =

- Unincorporated community
- Location within North Carolina Location within the United States
- Coordinates: 36°04′57″N 77°03′36″W
- Country: United States
- State: North Carolina
- County: Bertie
- Elevation: 59 ft (18 m)
- Time zone: UTC-5 (Eastern (EST))
  - Summer (DST): UTC-4 (EDT)
- Area code: 252
- GNIS feature ID: 993243

Republican is an unincorporated community in Bertie County, North Carolina, United States. The community is 8.6 miles (13.8 km) northwest of Windsor.

The King-Freeman-Speight House, which is listed on the National Register of Historic Places, is located near Republican.
