= Bertie County Schools =

School district in North Carolina, United States

Location
- Bertie County, North Carolina United States

District information
- Type: Public
- Grades: PK–12
- Superintendent: Dr. Otis Smallwood
- Accreditations: Southern Association of Colleges and Schools
- Schools: 9
- Budget: $ 37,105,000
- NCES District ID: 3700360

Students and staff
- Students: 2,900
- Teachers: 191.89 (on FTE basis)
- Staff: 225.89 (on FTE basis)
- Student–teacher ratio: 15.11:1

Other information
- Website: www.bertie.k12.nc.us

Bertie County Schools is a PK–12 graded school district serving Bertie County, North Carolina. Its nine schools serve 2,900 students as of the 2010–2011 school year.

== Student demographics ==
For the 2010–2011 school year, Bertie County Schools had a total population of 2,900 students and 191.89 teachers on a (FTE) basis. This produced a student-teacher ratio of 15.11:1. That same year, out of the student total, the gender ratio was 51% male to 49% female. The demographic group makeup was: Black, 83%; White, 13%; Hispanic, 1%; American Indian, 1%; and Asian/Pacific Islander, 1% (two or more races: 1%). For the same school year, 73.96% of the students received free and reduced-cost lunches.

== Governance ==
The primary governing body of Bertie County Schools follows a council–manager government format with a five-member Board of Education appointing a Superintendent to run the day-to-day operations of the system. The school system currently resides in the North Carolina State Board of Education's First District.

=== Board of education ===
The five members of the Board of Education meet on the first Tuesday of each month. The current members of the board are: Emma Johnson (Chair), Bobby Occena (Vice-Chair), Tarsha Dudley, Rickey Freeman, and Alton Parker.

=== Superintendent ===
The current superintendent of the system is Elaine White. She had been interim superintendent and was chosen to be the permanent superintendent in November, 2012. Before moving into the system administration, White was previously a principal at Aulander Elementary School, being chosen as a Wachovia Principal of the Year for Bertie County for the 2008–09 school year.

== Member schools ==
Bertie County Schools has nine schools ranging from pre-kindergarten to twelfth grade. Those nine schools are separated into three high schools, one middle school, four elementary schools, and one pre-school.

=== High schools ===
- Bertie Early College High School (Windsor)
- Bertie High School (Windsor)
- Bertie STEM High School (Windsor)

=== Middle schools ===
- Bertie Middle School (Windsor)

=== Elementary schools, pre-school ===
- Askewville Pre-School (Windsor)
- Aulander Elementary School (Aulander)
- Colerain Elementary School (Colerain)
- West Bertie Elementary (Kelford)
- Windsor Elementary (Windsor)

== See also ==
- List of school districts in North Carolina
