= Bertie High School =

American public school in North Carolina

Location
- 716 US Highway 13N; Windsor, North Carolina 27983; United States
- Coordinates: 35°56′46″N 76°57′28″W

Information
- Type: Public
- School district: Bertie County Schools
- Superintendent: Catherine Edmonds
- CEEB code: 344392
- Principal: Martha Davis
- Teaching staff: 30.81 (FTE)
- Enrollment: 478 (2023–2024)
- Student to teacher ratio: 15.51
- Colors: Blue and white
- Team name: Falcons
- Website: bhs.bertie.k12.nc.us

Bertie High School a public high school located in Windsor, North Carolina, United States. It is one of three high schools in the Bertie County Schools system in Bertie County. Bertie High School's enrollment as of 2015 is 945 students. The student body is 91% Black, 7% White, and 1% Hispanic.

== Notable alumni ==
- Ernestine Bazemore, state senator
- Kent Bazemore, NBA player
- Travis Bond, former NFL and Canadian Football League offensive lineman
- Jessica Breland, WNBA player
- Billy McShepard, basketball player in the Israeli National League
- Jethro Pugh, NFL defensive tackle
- James Tootie Robbins, NFL offensive tackle
