= Hope Plantation =

Historic house in North Carolina, United States

- U.S. National Register of Historic Places

- Location within North Carolina Location within the United States
- Location: 4 miles (6.4 km) northwest of Windsor, off NC 308, near Windsor, North Carolina
- Coordinates: 36°10′39″N 77°1′9″W
- Built: 1803
- Architectural style: Federal
- NRHP reference No.: 70000441
- Added to NRHP: April 17, 1970

Hope Plantation, built in 1803, is an early house built in the Palladian mode of the Federal style, located on the Carolina Coastal Plain, near Windsor, North Carolina, in the United States. The plantation house was built by David Stone, a member of the coastal Carolina planter class, later Governor of North Carolina and a United States senator. One of the finest examples of Palladian design built in timber, the manor house is slightly modified by neo-classical elements. The facade has five bays and a pedimented double portico with the original Chinese Chippendale balustrade. Crowning the house is a widow's walk with matching railing. The interior of the house displays a height and grandeur rare in the region, and is furnished with a unique collection of period furniture, art and artifacts.

By the 1960s, the building had survived almost a century of neglect and the citizens of Bertie County, aided by other North Carolinians and a far-flung net of support, formed the Historic Hope Foundation, Inc. (a registered non-profit organization) to purchase and rescue the house.

== Site history ==
The site on which the Hope Mansion is constructed was originally occupied by linguistic relatives of the Algonkian, the Sioux and the Iroquois. North of the site were the Meherrin, and in the immediate area the Tuscarora. Although neither group seems to have had a permanent settlement, hunting artifacts abound.

A Charter to the Carolinas was granted by Charles II of England to eight Lords Proprietor in 1663 in gratitude for their support in helping him recover his throne after the execution of his father. They immediately began recruiting settlers both from England and from the English settlers in Virginia. In the 1720s the Lords Proprietor granted 1,100 acres (4.5 km^{2}) of land at the western end of the Albemarle Sound, near the Cashie River, to the Hobson family.

Francis Hobson and his wife Elizabeth (of Hope Parrish in Derbyshire, England) migrated to the new world to occupy the land. In 1765, after Francis's death, Elizabeth inherited the property. When she married Zedekiah Stone, an emigrant from New England, the land became his and he named it "Hope" to honor her heritage. The elder Stones built a house and began raising a family. The remnants of their house and the probable location of the quarters of their enslaved servants and workers have been explored by expert archeologists. David Stone, Elizabeth and Zedekiah's son, was born in 1770. Despite his strong English heritage, he was raised as an American patriot, his father participating in early Provincial Congresses to support the revolutionary movement.

In 1793, David married Hannah Turner, and shortly before the marriage he was given the Hope tract by his father. David had graduated first in his class at Princeton, was widely read, and a correspondent of many of the new American intelligentsia (later with Thomas Jefferson). When he built, he built a grand mansion of European design. The house replicates almost exactly a plan in Abraham Swann's The British Architect, a book known to have been in Stone's library.

== Design ==
=== Exterior ===
The Palladian style was admired by Whigs and by American patriots, particularly in the South, who thought of themselves as inheritors of Roman ideas and ideals. The absolute balance of the symmetrical structure reflects the sense of order inherent in the style.

The house is built on high brick piers, allowing a full "basement" storey above ground. Imposing entry stairs lead to the pedimented double portico on the facade. This is lightened by the intricacy of the Chinese Chippendale balustrade on both stories of the portico and the roof walk. Four stepped chimneys and eight windows on the two sides, reinforce the front to back symmetry. The rear of the house, from which the structure is now approached, has a single height portico, with the Chippendale motif repeated.

Near the house, the kitchen has been reconstructed on the original foundation footprint. The elegant dairy has been restored.

=== Interior ===
The interior of Hope reflects its uniqueness in rural eastern North Carolina. The rooms chiefly used by David Stone and for entertaining are on the upper floor. The bedrooms, the family sitting room and the dining room on the entry level. The central hallway, which stretches the double front doors to the back is an imposing double hall, with an archway diving the two ends. The staircase is partially enclosed. Upstairs, there is a large, imposing landing which may have been used as an upper parlour to catch breezes. This leads into the drawing room, which resembles a ball room. Also off the landing is David Stone's library, which once held some 1400 volumes, a truly impressive collection for its time.

Also on this floor are smaller rooms which may have housed guests and are now interpreted as bedrooms. Best materials were used throughout, and although the timber was mainly local first-growth pine, a letter from a New York supplier, Joseph Sands, to David Stone in 1803, discusses marble and red stone for use in the fireplaces.

David Stone, a lawyer by training, died intestate. Thus, a complete inventory of his property was made by his administrator. Using this, the interior of the house was furnished by the Foundation with a degree of accuracy and appropriateness which has caught the attention of scholars.

== Also on the site ==
The 1763 King-Bazemore House represents a fine example of vernacular architecture. It is one of the few remaining examples in North Carolina of mid-eighteenth century "hall and parlor" design. The home has been restored and furnished based on the 1778 inventory of owner, William King.

Outbuildings include a restored kitchen and the manor house's original dairy, a smoke house and store buildings, an herb garden and a kitchen garden.

There are also extensive grounds (45 acres). The original grounds extended well beyond these and amounted to nearly 1,000 acres (4.0 km^{2}) of privately owned land, worked by over 200 slaves. The circa 1800 barn and the archeological sites make the basis for a walk which is often used as a fitness trail.

== Restoration ==
The house was sold by David Stone's son in 1836, and then passed through many hands. It endured decades of neglect. When rehabilitation of the structure was first considered in the 1960s and the state approached for aid by local citizens the executive director of the North Carolina Department of Archives and History said, "Hope is hopeless."

However, the Hope enthusiasts were not to be deterred, and on February 2, 1965, the Historic Hope Foundation, Incorporated was chartered. The house was bought by the foundation and a largely grass-roots restoration effort was launched.

By the late summer of the 1972, the restoration was complete.

== Current uses ==
The Historic Hope Foundation, Incorporated through its board of directors manages the Hope Mansion and subsidizes the opening of the buildings to the public. An administrator and public tourism officer is appointed by the State of North Carolina.

The foundation promotes several educational programs, and linkages with schools and universities. It also sponsors social functions, primarily the Governor Stone Ball, as fund-raising events.

== Sources ==
- "National Register Information System". National Register of Historic Places. National Park Service. Entries #70000411 and #71000570.
- Bivins, John Jr., Furniture of the North Carolina Roanoke River Basin in the Collection of Historic Hope Foundation.: Journal of Early Southern Decorative Arts. Summer 1996.
- Historic Hope Foundation, Inc., The Miracle of Hope Plantation. Windsor, NC: Historic Hope Foundation, Inc., 2002.
- Iobst, Richard W., Personal Life of David Stone. (microfilm). Windsor, NC Historic Society.
- Powell, William S., ed., Encyclopedia of North Carolina, Chapel Hill, University of North Carolina Press, 2006.
- Smallwood, Arwin D., Bertie County: An Eastern Carolina History, Charleston, Arcadia Publishing, 2002 (extensive source notes published separately by the author).
- Taylor, Melanie Johnson, David Stone: A Political Biography, Greenville, NC: East Carolina University, 1968.
- Umfleet, LeRae S., Books Known to David Stone, "Patron of the Arts and Sciences": An Exhibition of Volumes From His Reconstituted Library Plus Two Centuries of North Carolina Maps Dating From 1590, Exhibition Catelogue 1996.
- Watson, Alan D., Bertie County, A Brief History, Raleigh, North Carolina Department of Cultural Resources, 1982.
- "North Carolina Highway Marker A-7, David Stone".
