= Rhodes Site =

- Rhodes Site (31BR90)
- U.S. National Register of Historic Places
- Nearest city: Hamilton, North Carolina
- Area: 1 acre (0.40 ha)
- NRHP reference No.: 86001955
- Added to NRHP: August 28, 1986

The Rhodes Site, designated 31BR90, is a prehistoric archaeological site near Hamilton, North Carolina. It is a deeply buried midden located on the eastern bank of the Roanoke River, and has been dated to the Middle and Late Woodland Periods. The site was listed on the National Register of Historic Places in 1986.

== See also ==
- National Register of Historic Places listings in Bertie County, North Carolina
