= Jethro Pugh =

American football player (1944–2015)

No. 75
- Position: Defensive tackle

Personal information
- Born: July 3, 1944; Windsor, North Carolina, U.S.
- Died: January 7, 2015 (aged 70); Dallas, Texas, U.S.
- Listed height: 6 ft 6 in (1.98 m)
- Listed weight: 260 lb (118 kg)

Career information
- High school: Bertie (Windsor)
- College: Elizabeth City State
- NFL draft: 1965: 11th round, 145th overall pick

Career history
- Dallas Cowboys (1965–1978)

Awards and highlights
- 2× Super Bowl champion (VI, XII); 2× Second-team All-Pro (1968, 1973); 2× All-CIAA (1963, 1964)

Career NFL statistics
- Games: 183
- Fumble recoveries: 14
- Safeties: 2
- Interceptions: 1
- Stats at Pro Football Reference

Jethro Pugh Jr. (July 3, 1944 – January 7, 2015) was an American professional football defensive tackle in the National Football League (NFL) for the Dallas Cowboys for fourteen seasons. He played college football at Elizabeth City State College.

== Early life and college ==
Pugh was born on July 3, 1944, in Windsor, North Carolina, the son of Jethro Sr. and Mamie (Coggins) Pugh. He was raised in Indian Woods Township. Pugh graduated from W. S. Etheridge High School in Windsor, where he was an All-Conference tackle on the football team. He was coached by his uncle, Turner R. Coggins.

Pugh enrolled at nearby Elizabeth City State College at the age of 16, on an athletic scholarship. He played college football for the Vikings on offense and defense and became a two-time All-CIAA defensive end in 1963 and 1964. He is one of five persons to have his jersey retired by the school, now Elizabeth City State University.

In 1979, he was inducted into the Central Intercollegiate Athletic Association (CIAA) Hall of Fame. In 1980, he was inducted into the North Carolina Sports Hall of Fame. In 1981, he was inducted into the ECSU Sports Hall of Fame. In 2010, he was inducted into the National Black College Alumni Hall of Fame. In 2016, he was inducted into the Black College Football Hall of Fame.

In 1978, Windsor held a Jethro Pugh Day.

== Professional career ==
Pugh was selected in the eleventh round (145th overall) of the 1965 NFL draft, by the Dallas Cowboys, and was also offered a contract to play with the Oakland Raiders of the AFL. He was only 20 years old when he started his professional career as a backup defensive end for the Cowboys. At the end of the 1966 season, he was moved to left defensive tackle replacing Jim Colvin in the starting lineup. As a starter in 1967, he was the Cowboys most valuable player in two games; including a game against the Philadelphia Eagles where he had two fumble recoveries, a pass break-up, sacking Eagles quarterback Norm Snead for total losses of 14 yards, and leading the defense to seven tackles for losses.

In the final seconds of the 1967 NFL Championship Game, the famous Ice Bowl at Green Bay, Pugh was blocked by Packers' guard Jerry Kramer and center Ken Bowman for the game-deciding touchdown. Kramer's and Bowman's blocks cleared the way for Bart Starr to score on a 1-yard quarterback sneak with 16 seconds remaining, lifting Vince Lombardi's team to a 21–17 victory and an unprecedented third consecutive title game win in −15 °F (−26 °C) weather at Lambeau Field. Pugh believed, and film of the play arguably showed, that Kramer was offside on the play, and should have been called for a penalty. Kramer and Bowman may have admitted this as well. Pugh experienced frostbite that day.

It was the second consecutive season that Dallas had fallen to the Packers in the championship game; the previous year was a close game in the Cotton Bowl. Always a team player, Pugh carried on through the 1971 season with a case of appendicitis and delayed his surgery until the offseason, by taking shots of penicillin.

In 1968, he had four fumble recoveries and nine quarterback sacks. Pugh was voted second-team All-Pro by the Associated Press (AP). He played with the Cowboys for his entire career, from 1965 through 1978. His 14 seasons, matched by five others, represent the sixth-longest career in Cowboys history; only Jason Witten, L. P. Ladouceur, Ed "Too Tall" Jones, Bill Bates, and Mark Tuinei played more years.

Although he was widely regarded as an excellent player and received All-Pro honors in 1968, he was never voted to a Pro Bowl. Pugh's achievements as a professional athlete were largely overshadowed for most of his career by his defensive line teammates, who were Pro Bowl regulars. When Pugh started, he had to compete for attention with future Hall of Famer Bob Lilly and George Andrie; when they retired, Pugh played on the same defensive line with College and Pro Football Hall of Famer Randy White, Harvey Martin, and Ed "Too Tall" Jones. Both Lilly and White were named to the NFL 100th Anniversary Team.

Even though he was a physical player against the run, his athleticism enabled him to become an excellent pass rusher for a defensive tackle.

While quarterback sacks were not an official NFL statistic during his career, Pugh is unofficially credited with a career total of 95.5. He led the Cowboys in sacks each season from 1968 to 1972 with a high mark of 15.5 in 1968, a team record that stood until 2010 when DeMarcus Ware reached six straight seasons, eventually leading the Cowboys in sacks from 2005 to 2012. Pugh averaged 12½ sacks during one amazing stretch of his career (1968–1972), and currently ranks sixth on the Cowboys all-time sacks list with 95.5.

Following the 1978 season and Super Bowl XIII, in which he did not play due to injury, Pugh retired on January 29, 1979. During his career, he helped the Cowboys win two Super Bowls (playing in four), five NFC Championships, qualify for the NFL post-season in 12 out of 14 seasons, and played in a then league record 23 playoff games.

== Personal life ==
Pugh showed financial acumen from an early age, when he had the Cowboys defer part of his compensation, which was in the hundreds of thousands of dollars by the time he retired. Pugh owned a number of western-themed gift shops at Dallas-Fort Worth International Airport in Texas. He later partnered with The Parodies Shops which had businesses across the U.S. and Canada. He also hosted an annual Jethro Pugh Celebrity Golf Tournament in Dallas to raise funds for the United Negro College Fund.

== Death ==
On January 7, 2015, he died at the age of 70 in Dallas, Texas.
