= Woodsville =

Woodsville may refer to:

United States

- Woodsville, New Hampshire, a census-designated place in Grafton County
  - Woodsville High School, in the above CDP
- Woodsville, New Jersey, an unincorporated community in Mercer County, New Jersey
  - Woodsville Brook, a tributary of Stony Brook near the above community

Singapore

- Woodsville Interchange, a road interchange

== See also ==
- Woodville (disambiguation)
