= Woodville, North Carolina =

Woodville, North Carolina may refer to:

- Lewiston Woodville, Bertie County, North Carolina
- Woodville, Perquimans County, North Carolina
- Woodville, Surry County, North Carolina

== See also ==
- Woodville (disambiguation)
