= Stockton (Woodville, North Carolina) =

Historic house in North Carolina, United States

- U.S. National Register of Historic Places
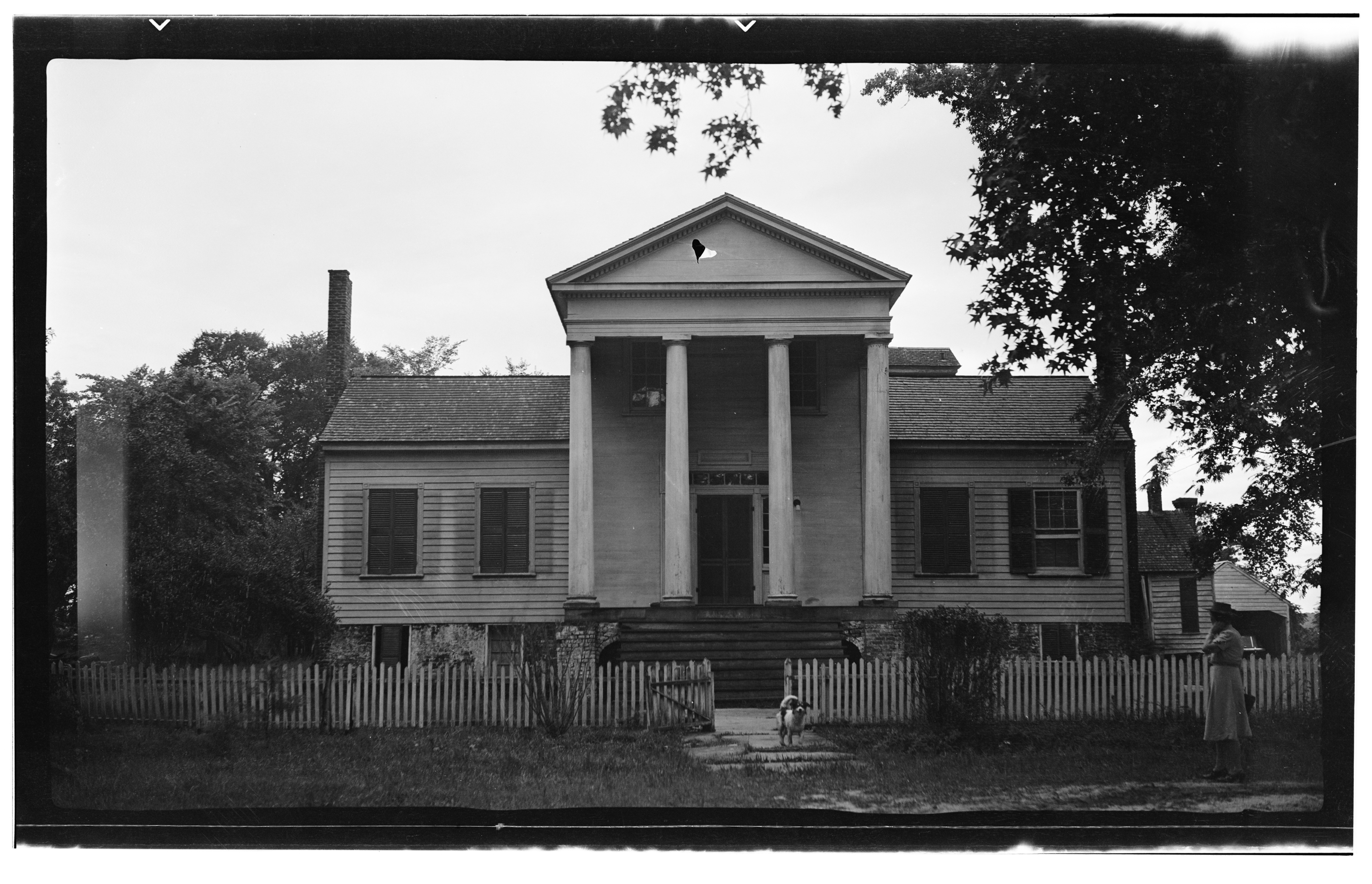
- Stockton, HABS photo

- Location within North Carolina Location within the United States
- Nearest city: S of Woodville, near Woodville, North Carolina
- Coordinates: 36°12′57″N 76°19′6″W
- Area: 9 acres (3.6 ha)
- Built: c. 1848
- Built by: Josiah Thomas Granbery
- Architectural style: Greek Revival
- NRHP reference No.: 74001368
- Added to NRHP: June 7, 1974

Stockton is a historic plantation house located near Woodville, Perquimans County, North Carolina. It was built in 1840, by Josiah T. Granbery and consists of a two-story, three-bay, temple form central section flanked by one-story wings. The Greek Revival style frame house has gable roofs on each section and a prostyle tetrastyle Doric order portico on the front of the central section. It was the boyhood home of Robert W. Welch Jr. (1899-1930). The house and 500 acres was then sold to Alvie Cook in 1935 who owned it until his death in 1970. Alvie and Mabel Cook raised five daughters in the home: Marguerite, Sue, Peggy, Grace, and Mabel Louise (known as Pete and later Kate). After Alvie's death, Mabel Cook, sold it in 1972 to Eugene and Ellen Rountree. In 1992 Historic Preservation Foundation of North Carolina holds Protective Covenants and the house is sold to Terry L. and LuAnn H. Cobbs who own Stockton to this day.

The house was added to the National Register of Historic Places in 1974.
