= David Outlaw =

American politician (1806–1868)

Member of the U.S. House of Representatives from North Carolina's 9th district
- In office March 4, 1847 – March 3, 1853
- Preceded by: Asa Biggs
- Succeeded by: District inactive

Personal details
- Born: September 14, 1806 near Windsor, North Carolina, U.S.
- Died: October 22, 1868 (aged 62) Windsor, North Carolina, U.S.
- Resting place: Episcopal Cemetery, Windsor, North Carolina, U.S.
- Party: Whig
- Relatives: George Outlaw (cousin)
- Education: University of North Carolina at Chapel Hill
- Profession: Politician, lawyer

David Outlaw (September 14, 1806 – October 22, 1868) was a Whig U.S. congressman representing the Albemarle district of North Carolina between 1847 and 1853.

Born near Windsor, North Carolina in 1806, Outlaw attended private schools and academies in Bertie County. He graduated from the University of North Carolina at Chapel Hill in 1824, where he was a member of the Philanthropic Society. He then studied law and was admitted to the bar in 1825, opening a practice in Windsor.

A member of the North Carolina House of Representatives from 1831 to 1834, Outlaw was a delegate to the state constitutional convention of 1835.

From 1836 to 1844, Outlaw was solicitor of the first judicial district in North Carolina. In 1844, he was nominated at the Whig National Convention as their candidate for the 29th United States Congress but Outlaw was defeated in the general election. He ran again and won two years later, subsequently serving in the 30th, 31st, and 32nd U.S. Congresses (March 4, 1847 – March 3, 1853). Outlaw was renominated by the Whigs in 1852 to compete for his seat in the 33rd Congress but was defeated in the general election by his Democratic opponent, Henry Marchmore Shaw.

Outlaw returned to state politics, serving Bertie County in the North Carolina House of Representatives from 1854 to 1860, and the North Carolina Senate in 1860 and 1866. He ran for the Senate in 1862 and 1864 but lost in each election.

Outlaw, running for the North Carolina Senate in 1864, assured voters that he would support the re-election of Governor Zebulon Baird Vance and seek peace with the North based on Southern Independence. If elected, he would also oppose a convention, "believing it to be a trick, by which North Carolina was to be withdrawn from the Confederacy."

Outlaw served as a colonel in the Bertie County regiment of the North Carolina state militia.

Outlaw died in Windsor, where he is buried in the Episcopal Cemetery.

Outlaw was the son of Raphael Outlaw and the cousin of US Congressman and North Carolina State Senator George Outlaw.

U.S. House of Representatives
| Preceded by Asa Biggs | Member of the U.S. House of Representatives from North Carolina's 9th congressional district 1847–1853 | Succeeded by District inactive |
