= The Hermitage (Merry Hill, North Carolina) =

Historic house in North Carolina, United States

- U.S. National Register of Historic Places
- Location within North Carolina Location within the United States
- Location: North of Merry Hill, near Merry Hill, North Carolina
- Coordinates: 36°5′12″N 76°44′0″W
- Area: 2 acres (0.81 ha)
- Built: late 1700s
- Architectural style: Early Republic, Greek Revival, Federal
- NRHP reference No.: 82003427
- Added to NRHP: June 8, 1982

The Hermitage is a historic plantation house located near Merry Hill, Bertie County, North Carolina. It consists of a 1 1/2-story, side hall plan Georgian style rear wing with a 2 1/2-story, five-bay, Federal style addition. Also on the property are the contributing gable roof smokehouse and a two-room structure dating from the Greek Revival period.

It was added to the National Register of Historic Places in 1982.

The owners of the plantation were Alexander W. Mebane (1800-1847) and Augustus Holley (1820-1882).
