= Woodville, Perquimans County, North Carolina =

Woodville
- Unincorporated community
- Location within the state of North Carolina
- Coordinates: 36°14′04″N 76°19′35″W
- Country: United States
- State: North Carolina
- County: Perquimans
- Elevation: 3 ft (0.91 m)
- Time zone: UTC-5 (Eastern (EST))
  - Summer (DST): UTC-4 (EDT)
- GNIS feature ID: 997619

Woodville is an unincorporated community in Perquimans and Pasquotank counties in North Carolina, United States. It lies on U.S. Highway 17, southwest of Elizabeth City. Stockton is a historic home located south of Woodville and is on the National Register of Historic Places due to its distinct Federal style.

== See also ==
- Woodville, North Carolina
