= Woodville School (Wakefield, Massachusetts) =

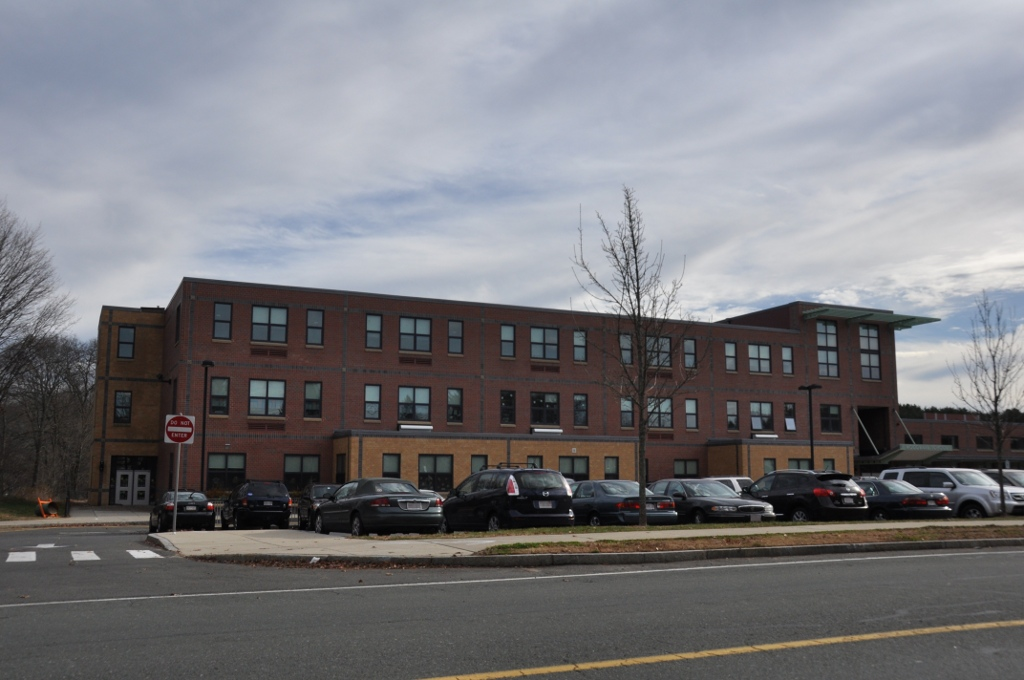

Location
- 30 Farm Street; Wakefield, Middlesex County, Massachusetts 01880; United States

Information
- Type: Public
- School district: Wakefield School District
- Principal: Brian Middleton-Cox

The Woodville School is a public elementary school at 30 Farm Road in Wakefield, Massachusetts. The present building was built in 2003, replacing an older building that was listed on the National Register of Historic Places in 1989.

== History ==
The Woodville School area was initially part of Wakefield's eastern district, and was served by a district school known as the Little World School. In 1857 the School Committee renamed that school the Woodville School. The area remained largely rural until the turn of the 20th century, when suburban development resulted in a significant increase in the student population. A large Dutch Colonial Revival brick building was built in 1919–20 to address this increased demand. It served as an elementary school until 1950, after which it was converted for use as a junior high school serving grades 7 and 8. That school, listed on the National Register in 1989, was torn down to make way for the present Woodville School building.

== See also ==
- National Register of Historic Places listings in Wakefield, Massachusetts
- National Register of Historic Places listings in Middlesex County, Massachusetts
