= St. Frances Methodist Church =

Historic church in North Carolina, United States

- U.S. National Register of Historic Places
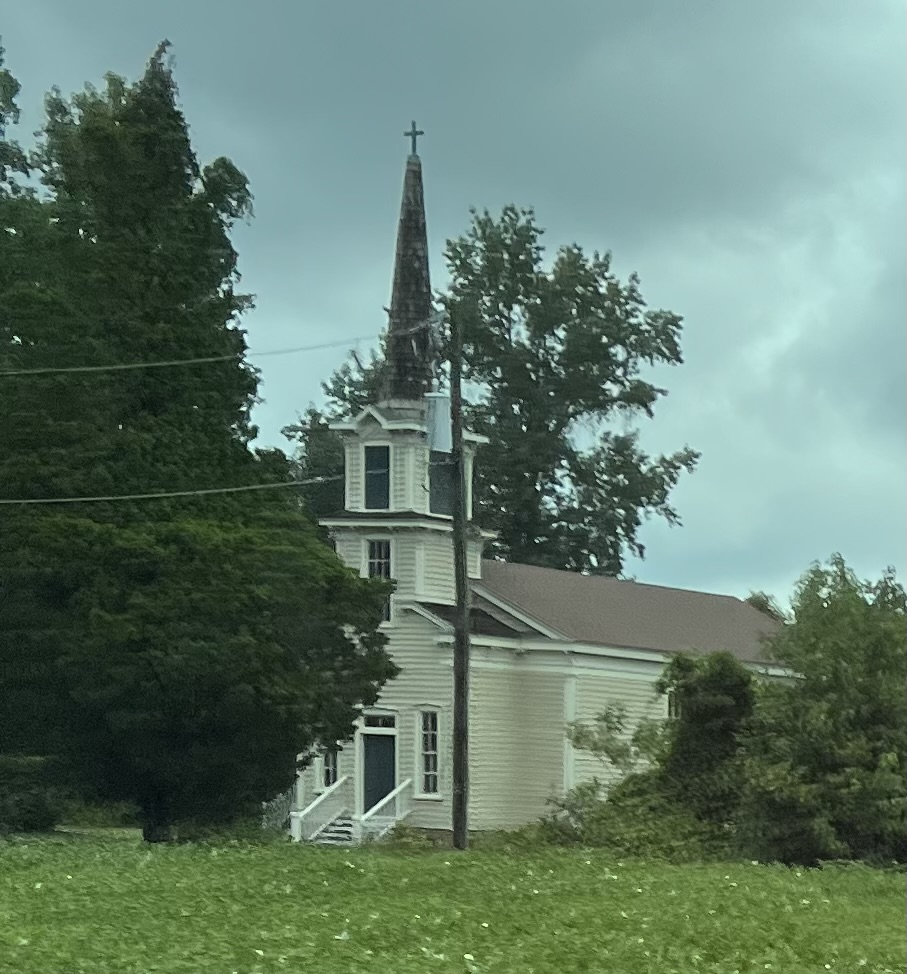

- Location within North Carolina Location within the United States
- Location: Off NC 308, Lewiston, North Carolina
- Coordinates: 36°7′24″N 77°10′40″W
- Area: less than one acre
- Built: 1845
- Architect: Bragg, Thomas
- Architectural style: Greek Revival
- NRHP reference No.: 82003426
- Added to NRHP: April 29, 1982

St. Frances Methodist Church is a historic Methodist church located off NC 308 in Lewiston-Woodville, Bertie County, North Carolina, built in 1845.

== Architecture ==
Built by Thomas Bragg, Sr., it is a one-story, rectangular frame church, three bays by two bays, with a Greek Revival style interior. It features a projecting narthex and two-story tower topped by an octagonal steeple. It was added to the National Register of Historic Places in 1982.

== History ==
The church was built on three acres donated by Humphrey H. Hardy, with $1,000 bequeathed by Frances S. Pugh of Woodville, after whom the church was named. According to the 1894 memoirs of Dr. Charles Smallwood, a charter member, the church had been built by Thomas Bragg, Sr. of Warren County.

In 1896, as the Lewiston congregants outnumbered the Woodville congregants, the church was pulled by mule team three quarters of a mile to Lewiston, although the original cemetery remained in use. The church was moved again in 1966 to be set back farther from the street. By the time of its nomination to the National Register, there were nine congregants remaining, with services held once a month. By the early 1990s, the congregation had diminished to a single member, Elizabeth Steinhardt-Widmer. Historic Woodville, Inc., a local preservation trust formed in 1998, took on the church as its first restoration project. The church was moved back to its original Woodville site in 2000. Bruce Lassiter, a local restoration contractor, commenced work soon thereafter, completing the restoration in 2004.

It was acquired in 2013 by Annette and Kim Ringeisen, who intended to use it as a wedding venue, but they relocated to California after only one season, and placed the church on the market.
