= Freeman Hotel (Windsor, North Carolina) =

Historic hotel in North Carolina, US

- U.S. National Register of Historic Places
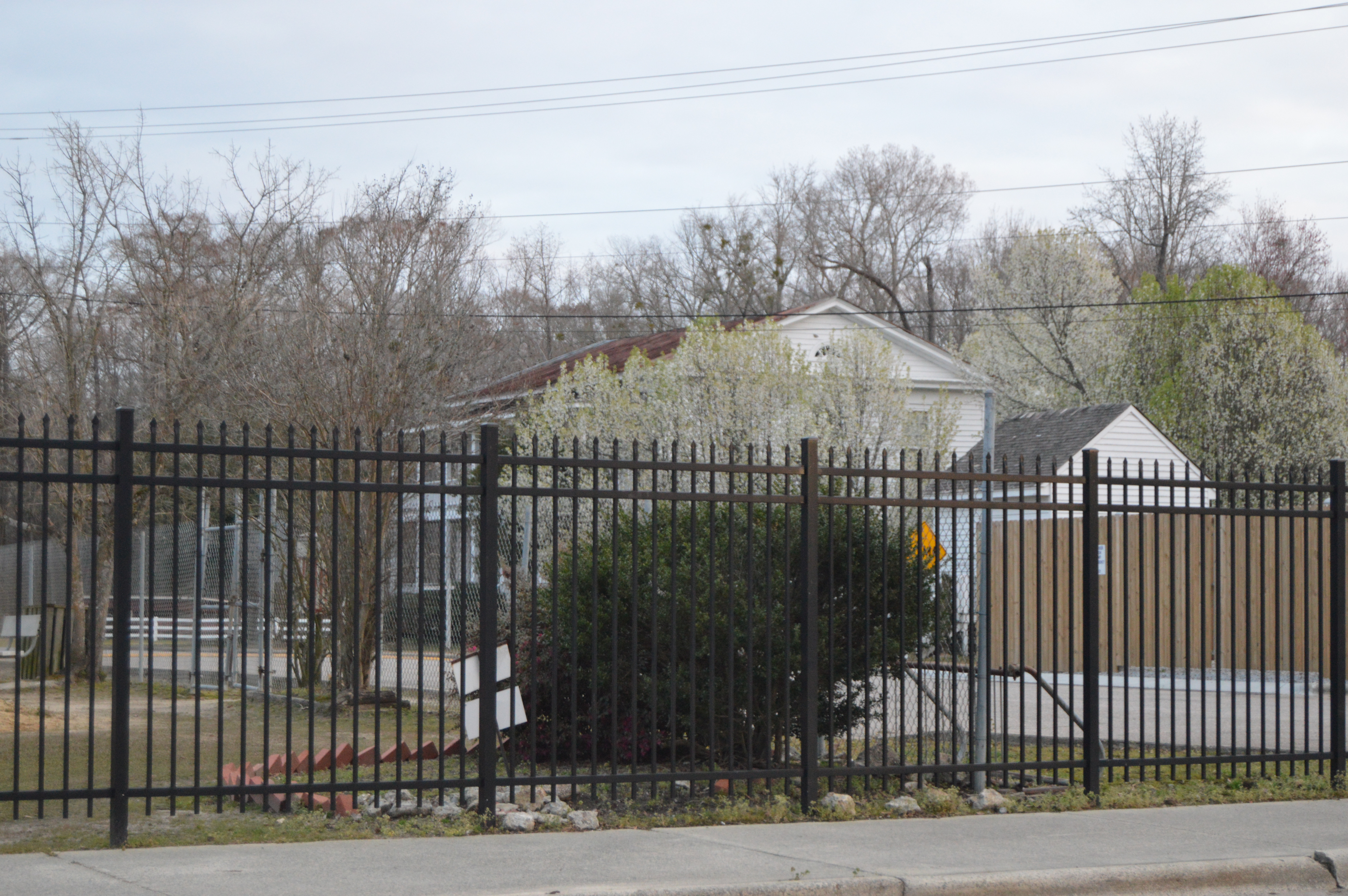
- Distant view from Granville Street

- Location within North Carolina Location within the United States
- Location: York and Granville Sts., Windsor, North Carolina
- Coordinates: 35°59′57″N 76°56′43″W
- Area: 1 acre (0.40 ha)
- Built: c. 1845
- Architectural style: Greek Revival
- NRHP reference No.: 82003432
- Added to NRHP: September 9, 1982

Freeman Hotel is a historic hotel building located at Windsor, Bertie County, North Carolina. It was built about 1845, and is a two-story, five-bay, frame Greek Revival-style building. It features a double portico. From about 1888 until 1936 the building served Windsor as a hotel of eight rooms and two dining rooms. The building was moved to its present location in 1981.

It was added to the National Register of Historic Places in 1982.
