= Roxobel, North Carolina =

- Town
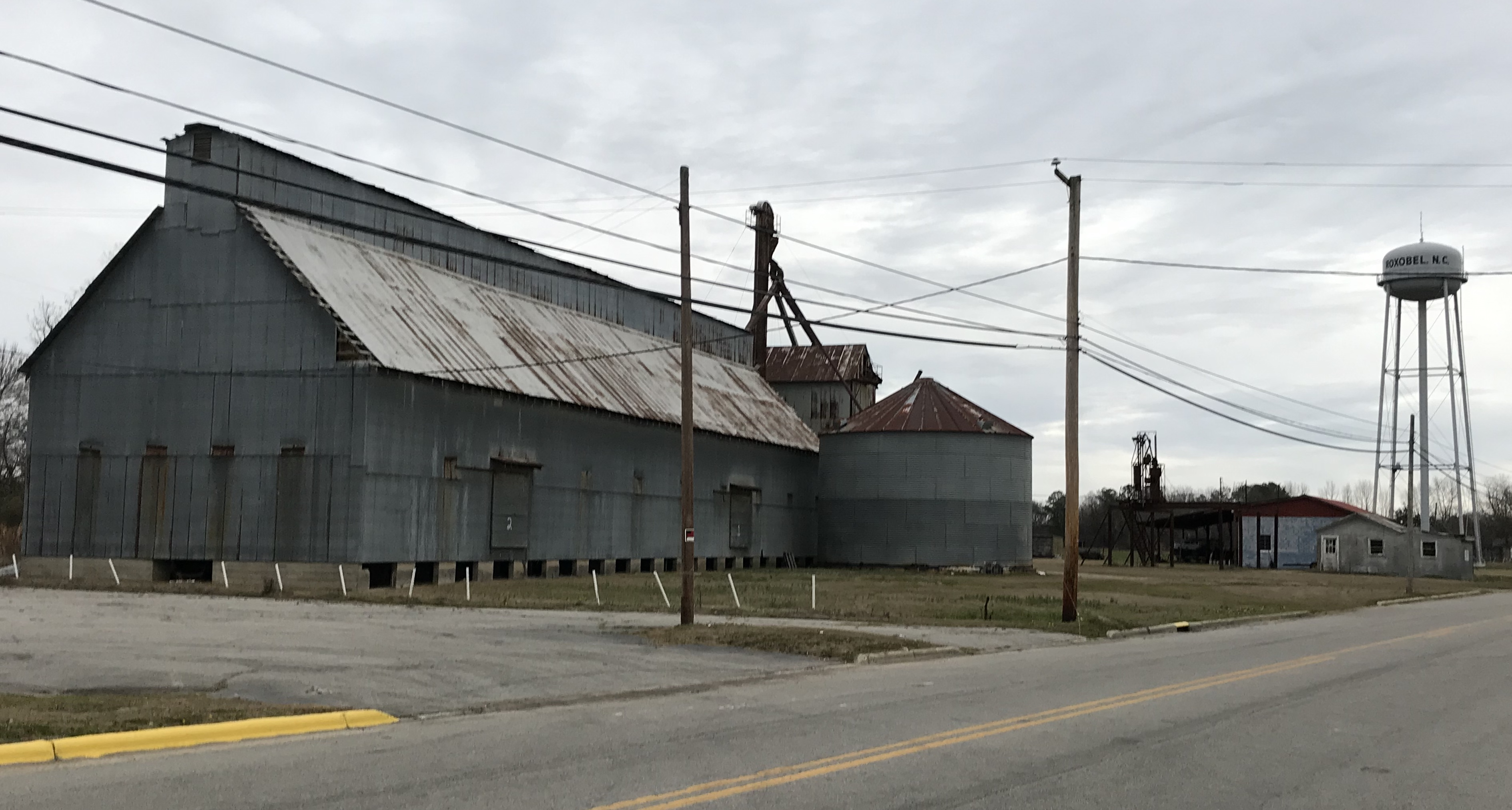
- Nicknames: Peanut Town, Red Refuge, North Kelford
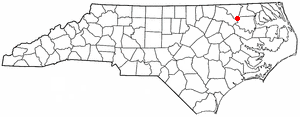
- Location of Roxobel, North Carolina
- Coordinates: 36°12′06″N 77°14′23″W
- Country: United States
- State: North Carolina
- County: Bertie

Government
  - Steward: Lenore Walston

Area
  - Total: 1.04 sq mi (2.70 km^{2})
  - Land: 1.04 sq mi (2.70 km^{2})
  - Water: 0 sq mi (0.00 km^{2})
- Elevation: 92 ft (28 m)

Population (2020)
  - Total: 187
  - Density: 179.3/sq mi (69.23/km^{2})
- Time zone: UTC-5 (Eastern (EST))
  - Summer (DST): UTC-4 (EDT)
- ZIP code: 27872
- Area code: 252
- FIPS code: 37-58180
- GNIS feature ID: 2407254

Roxobel is a town in northwestern Bertie County, North Carolina, United States. It dates to 1724 and was originally known as Cotten's Cross Roads. After several name changes, it has remained Roxobel since 1849. The population was 179 at the 2020 census.

== History ==
Roxobel Township, in the northwest corner of Bertie County, North Carolina, consists of the twin towns of Roxobel and Kelford and the surrounding 60 square miles of farms and plantations. It stretches from Roxobel in the north to the outskirts of Woodville in the south, and from the Roanoke River in the west to the border of Aulander in the east.

Roxobel is the older town, dating to the early eighteenth century. In 1719, John Cotten, a major slave plantation owner from South Quay, Virginia, purchased 540 acres of land in what is now Bertie County and neighbouring Hertford County. He and his large family established settlements and plantations across this land. His son, Samuel Cotten, had already set up home in the area that became Roxobel and these lands were part of those acquired by his father. He inherited the land on his father’s death, but he was hardly a model citizen: “Little is known of Samuel Cotten, except that he was hardy, vigorous, domineering and rich. He was not at all conventional in his relations with women and some other things, I suspect, and having lived to a great age more feared than loved.” The settlement was located at the intersection of two roads, one leading south to the Roanoke River, the other heading west, and was initially known as Cotten's Cross Roads.

In 1756 the Cotten family moved to their plantation in Northampton County and the Granbery family moved into the area. William Granbery was a plantation owner and Thomas Granbery was a timber and furniture merchant. Around 1808, possibly to commemorate William Granbery who died that year, the town was renamed Granberys Cross Roads.

An indication of the growing population in the area was the establishment of the Bertie Church. Initially when it was set up in 1740 it was an ad hoc branch of a neighboring church, but in 1750 it was constituted as an independent Baptist church with its own pastor. Included in its congregation at the turn of the nineteenth century were 125 enslaved people from the local plantations. In the early nineteenth century the church moved a mile out of town to Sandy Run and became known as the Sandy Run Baptist Church and, although the church moved back into the town in 1854, it retained this name. A masonic lodge was also formed in 1799, with the Davie Lodge No. 39. This had a membership of around 20 of the area’s prominent landowners and businessmen, although several members were expelled in its early years as they fell foul of the strict masonic code of behaviour.

Around 1815 William Britton, a successful merchant and farmer from Petersburg, Virginia, moved into the area and purchased the general store. By 1819 he had taken over the post office. The town then became known as Britton’s Store or Britton’s Cross Roads. This name was considered by the post office to be too similar to Britton’s Neck in South Carolina and so in December 1847 the town was renamed Roxobel after Mary Martha Sherwood’s popular 1831 novel Roxobel.

By 1830 the Roanoke River had been made navigable for steamboats and with the small landing stage of Norfleet’s Ferry just two miles south of Roxobel this spurred the town’s growth as a trading center. Roxobel became connected by rail when the Roanoke and Tar Railroad was opened in 1888 and this brought renewed prosperity to the town. By 1906 Roxobel’s population was nearing 400 and was served by six retail stores, a wholesale store, two churches and a school. The second church was the Episcopal Church, St Marks, which was established in 1881. The school was Roxobel Academy, which was established in 1890 with a roll of about 30 pupils. The growing commercial needs of the town were serviced by the Bank of Roxobel, which was opened in 1908.

The town of Kelford lies two miles south of Roxobel and was laid out in 1890 in response to the construction of the Norfolk and Carolina Railroad. The station was opened, and the town incorporated, in 1892. The town included stores, a hotel, a Baptist church, a school and a bank. By 1910 it had a population of just over 300. In 1914 a Coca-Cola bottling plant was opened in the town and became one of the town’s major employers. After rapid expansion the town suffered during the depression years when several businesses folded, the hotel and the bank closed and the school roll was combined with Roxobel.

In 1943 a tornado ripped through Roxobel, killing six inhabitants and causing massive damage. Twenty-five homes and 12 store buildings were completely destroyed and the Methodist church was lifted several hundred feet into the air and smashed to the ground. Around 50 other buildings were badly damaged. Further tornadoes in 1984 and 1988 caused similar destruction.

As well as the two towns in Roxobel Township there were a number of significant plantations. The largest plantation owner in the area was Stephen Andrews Norfleet (1822-1910) who had several cotton plantations in Bertie County, including Woodbourne, Indian Woods, Norfleet's Ferry, and Kelford. His father, Thomas Figuers Norfleet, established the Woodbourne estate around 1810 and he inherited it following his father’s death in 1838. Kelford Plantation was established when Stephen A. Norfleet bought 600 acres of land from the heirs of the Granbery family in 1848-1850. He erected a home known as Kelford on the plantation, which later gave its name to the nearby town. By the time of the Civil War, Norfleet owned 150 slaves and 4,000 acres of land in Bertie County. His plantation journals and accounts from 1844 to 1895 have survived and contain records of the enslaved and formerly enslaved people on his plantations. During the American Civil War he was appointed Colonel of the Bertie Country Militia and was put in charge of the county’s Confederate military affairs.

The Pineview plantation was established when 325 acres of land were purchased from the Granbery family by Joshua Brown in 1835. By 1850 he owned 17 enslaved people and 394 acres of farmland, which was used for livestock, corn, peas, sweet potatoes, and cotton. His son, Joseph Henry Browne, inherited the estate in 1856 and expanded it to 500 acres. During the Civil War, Browne served as a lieutenant in the Confederate army.

The Oaklana plantation was created in 1825 when Perry Cotten Tyler purchased 240 acres of land to the north of Roxobel for the production of corn and cotton. By 1850 Tyler owned of 3,000 acres of and 34 enslaved people. His son, John E. Tyler, took over the plantation in 1886 and as well as his farming interests he was a scholar of Latin and Greek, published poetry and obtained patents for numerous inventions for farming equipment, ordnance, and mechanical tools. He also served as a judge of the Inferior Court of Bertie County.

Oaklana, Pineview, and Woodbourne are listed on the National Register of Historic Places.

== Geography ==
According to the United States Census Bureau, the town has a total area of 1.0 square mile (2.7 km^{2}), all land.

== Demographics ==
Historical population
Census	Pop.	Note	%±
1900	227		—
1910	491		116.3%
1920	330		−32.8%
1930	334		1.2%
1940	332		−0.6%
1950	394		18.7%
1960	452		14.7%
1970	347		−23.2%
1980	278		−19.9%
1990	244		−12.2%
2000	263		7.8%
2010	240		−8.7%
2020	187		−22.1%
U.S. Decennial Census

=== Racial and ethnic composition ===
Roxobel town, North Carolina – Racial and ethnic composition Note: the US Census treats Hispanic/Latino as an ethnic category. This table excludes Latinos from the racial categories and assigns them to a separate category. Hispanics/Latinos may be of any race.
Race / Ethnicity (NH = Non-Hispanic)	Pop 2000	Pop 2010	Pop 2020	% 2000	% 2010	% 2020
White alone (NH)	135	130	76	51.33%	54.17%	40.64%
Black or African American alone (NH)	122	109	99	46.39%	45.42%	52.94%
Native American or Alaska Native alone (NH)	0	0	0	0.00%	0.00%	0.00%
Asian alone (NH)	0	0	1	0.00%	0.00%	0.53%
Native Hawaiian or Pacific Islander alone (NH)	0	0	0	0.00%	0.00%	0.00%
Other race alone (NH)	1	0	0	0.38%	0.00%	0.00%
Mixed race or Multiracial (NH)	2	0	4	0.76%	0.00%	2.14%
Hispanic or Latino (any race)	3	1	7	1.14%	0.42%	3.74%
Total	263	240	187	100.00%	100.00%	100.00%

=== 2000 census ===
As of the census of 2000, there were 263 people, 112 households, and 72 families residing in the town. The population density was 254.7 inhabitants per square mile (98.3/km^{2}). There were 121 housing units at an average density of 117.2 per square mile (45.3/km^{2}). The racial makeup of the town was 51.33% White, 46.39% African American, 1.52% from other races, and 0.76% from two or more races. Hispanic or Latino of any race were 1.14% of the population.

There were 112 households, out of which 26.8% had children under the age of 18 living with them, 42.9% were married couples living together, 15.2% had a female householder with no husband present, and 35.7% were non-families. 29.5% of all households were made up of individuals, and 18.8% had someone living alone who was 65 years of age or older. The average household size was 2.35 and the average family size was 2.90.

In the town, the population was spread out, with 21.3% under the age of 18, 10.3% from 18 to 24, 23.2% from 25 to 44, 22.4% from 45 to 64, and 22.8% who were 65 years of age or older. The median age was 42 years. For every 100 females, there were 89.2 males. For every 100 females age 18 and over, there were 88.2 males.

The median income for a household in the town was $28,393, and the median income for a family was $28,036. Males had a median income of $20,833 versus $14,063 for females. The per capita income for the town was $12,798. About 10.5% of families and 12.3% of the population were below the poverty line, including 11.1% of those under the age of eighteen and 17.6% of those 65 or over.
