= Bertie County Courthouse =

Historic courthouse in North Carolina, US

- U.S. National Register of Historic Places
- U.S. Historic district – Contributing property
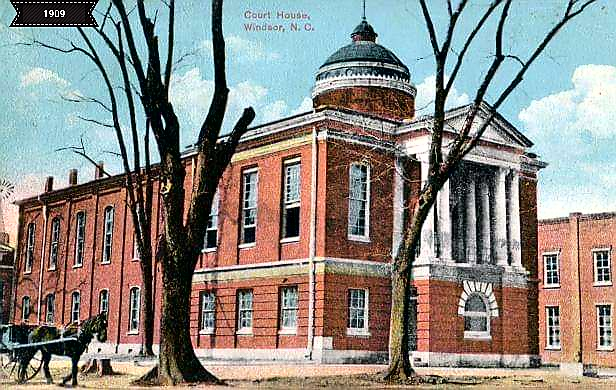
- Bertie County Courthouse in 1909

- Location within North Carolina Location within the United States
- Location: King and Dundee Sts., Windsor, North Carolina
- Coordinates: 35°59′50″N 76°56′49″W
- Area: less than one acre
- Built: 1889
- Built by: L. Thrower
- Architectural style: Classical Revival
- Part of: Windsor Historic District (ID86003146)
- MPS: North Carolina County Courthouses TR
- NRHP reference No.: 79001662
- Added to NRHP: May 10, 1979

Bertie County Courthouse is a historic courthouse building located at Windsor, Bertie County, North Carolina. It was built in 1889, and is a 2 1/2-story, brick Neoclassical-style building with a gable roof topped by a polygonal cupola. In 1941, the portico was enlarged and wings added to the main block. A rear addition was built in 1974.

It was added to the National Register of Historic Places in 1979. It is located in the Windsor Historic District.
