= George R. Throop =

American academic administrator

George Reeves Throop/ˈtruːp/ (1882–1949) was the Chancellor of Washington University in St. Louis from 1927 until 1944.

== Early life ==
Throop was born in Boydsville, Tennessee. He earned his undergraduate and master's degree from DePauw University. He received his doctorate in classics from Cornell University.

== Washington University ==
Throop joined the faculty of Washington University in 1907 as an instructor in Latin and Greek. During his tenure as Chancellor the School of Architecture's Givens Hall was constructed. Also, The Extension Division, which offered evening and weekend classes became University College. He guided the University through the difficult years of the Great Depression and World War II, that saw declining enrollments and revenues.
