= Windsor Historic District (Windsor, North Carolina) =

Historic district in North Carolina, United States

- U.S. National Register of Historic Places
- U.S. Historic district
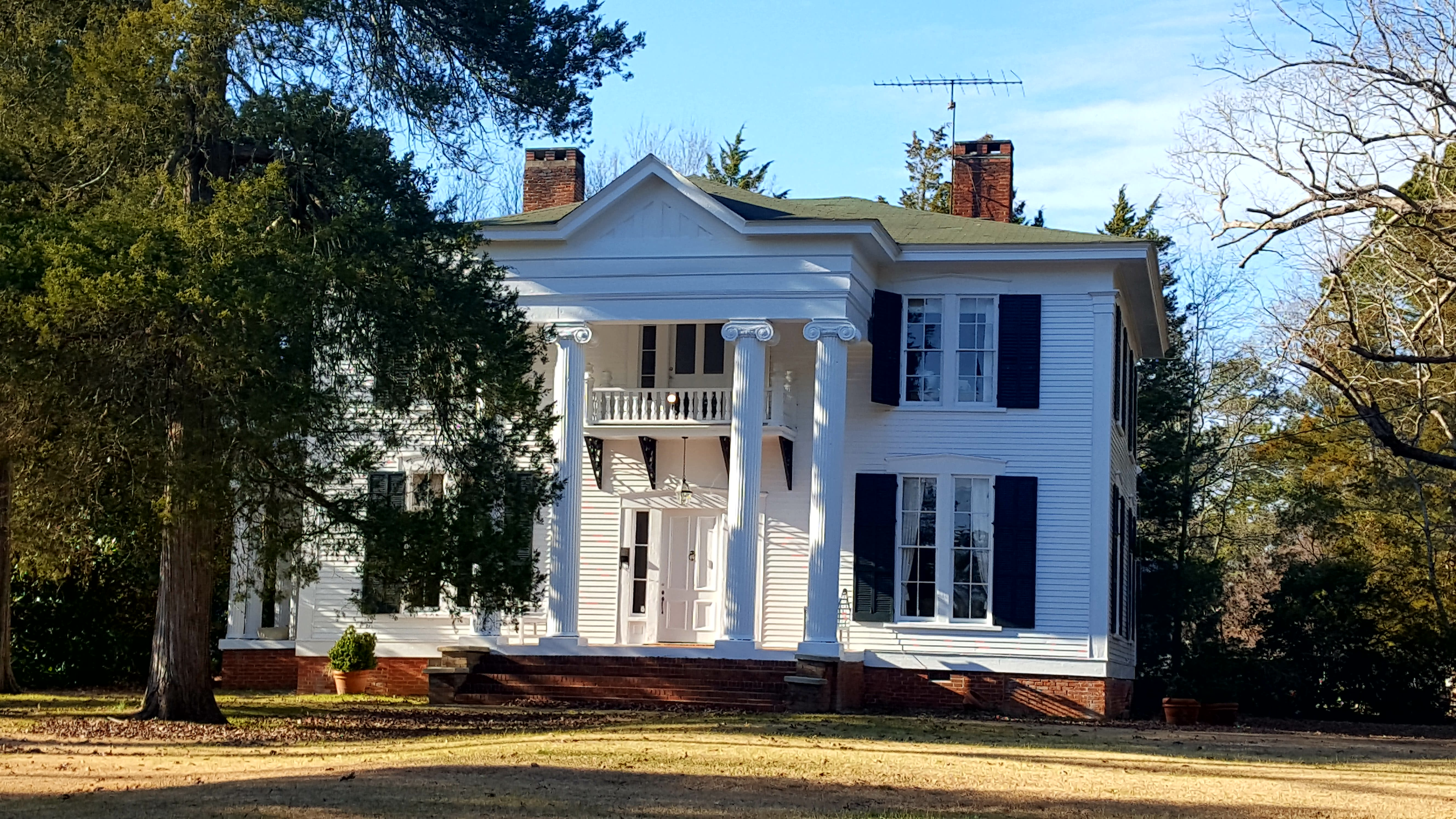

- Location within North Carolina Location within the United States
- Location: Roughly bounded by York, Water, Sutton, and Elmo Sts., Windsor, North Carolina
- Coordinates: 35°59′49″N 76°56′44″W
- Area: 68 acres (28 ha)
- Built: 1768
- Architect: Multiple
- Architectural style: Bungalow/craftsman, Late Victorian, Georgian
- NRHP reference No.: 86003146
- Added to NRHP: July 29, 1991

Windsor Historic District is a national historic district located at Windsor, Bertie County, North Carolina. It encompasses 78 contributing buildings, 1 contributing site, 7 contributing structures, and 1 contributing object in the town of Windsor. It includes residential, commercial, and institutional buildings that primarily date after the turn of the 20th century. Notable buildings include the Bertie County Courthouse and Confederate Monument, Masonic Lodge (1848, 1917), Spruill Building, J. B. Gillam House, St. Thomas Episcopal Church, and Cashie Baptist Church (1910).

It was added to the National Register of Historic Places in 1982.
