= Elmwood (Merry Hill, North Carolina) =

Historic house in North Carolina, United States

- U.S. National Register of Historic Places
- Location within North Carolina Location within the United States
- Location: 637 Avoca Farm Rd., near Merry Hill, North Carolina
- Coordinates: 36°0′7″N 76°43′35″W
- Area: 2 acres (0.81 ha)
- Built: c. 1787, c. 1810
- Architectural style: Georgian, Federal
- NRHP reference No.: 02001710
- Added to NRHP: January 15, 2003

Elmwood is a historic plantation house located near Merry Hill, Bertie County, North Carolina. It was built in two phases about 1787 and 1810. It is a two-story, seven-bay, transitional Georgian / Federal style frame dwelling.

It was added to the National Register of Historic Places in 2003.
