= King House (Windsor, North Carolina) =

Historic house in North Carolina, United States

- U.S. National Register of Historic Places
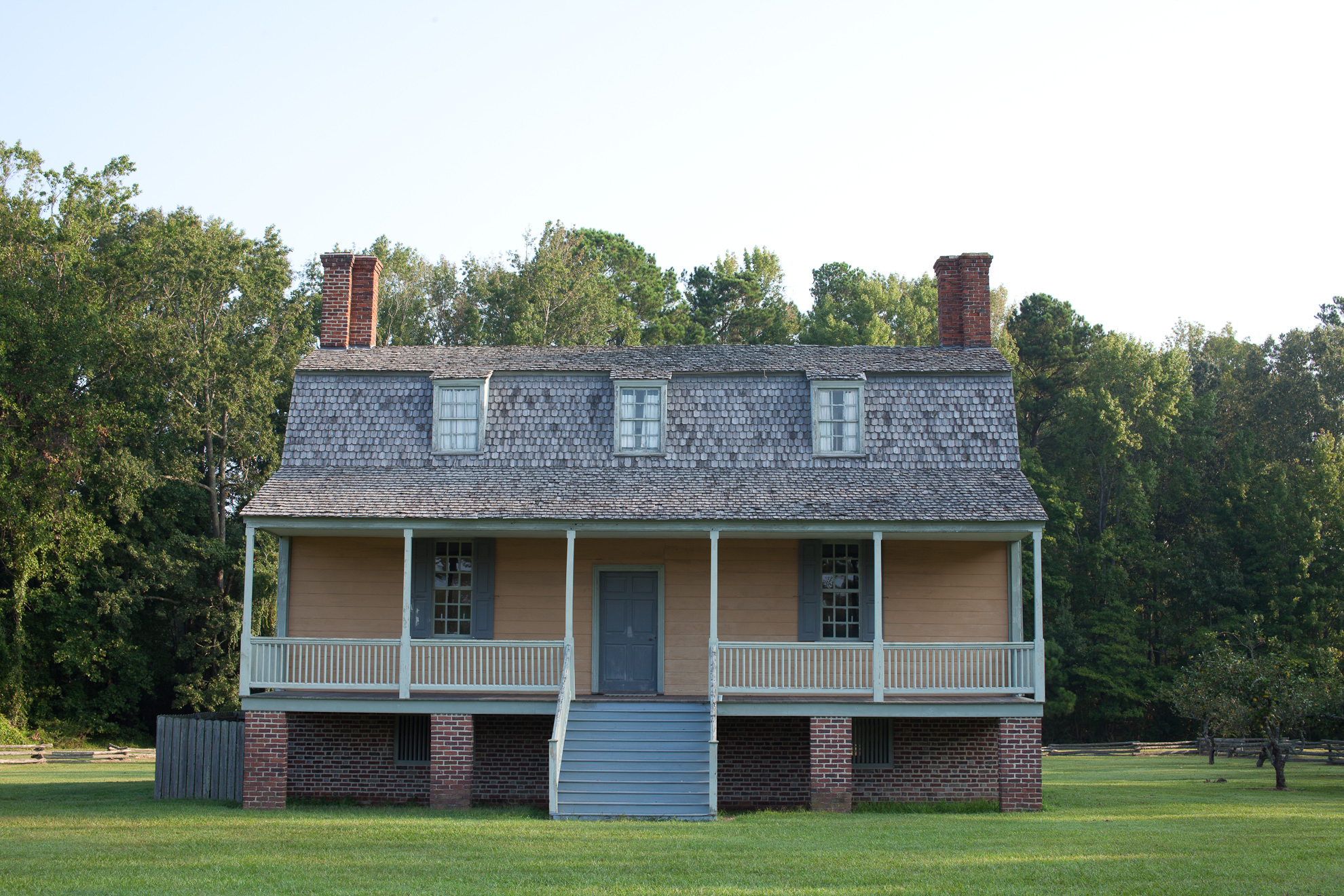

- Location within North Carolina Location within the United States
- Location: 132 Hope House Road Windsor, North Carolina
- Coordinates: 36°1′49″N 77°1′9″W
- Area: less than one acre
- Built: 1763
- NRHP reference No.: 71000570
- Added to NRHP: August 26, 1971

King House, also known as King-Bazemore House, is a historic plantation house located near Windsor, Bertie County, North Carolina. It was built in 1763, and is a 1 1/2-story, frame dwelling with brick ends. It has a gambrel roof and features two interior T-stack end chimneys. It is one of two known gambrel roofed dwellings with brick ends in North Carolina.

It was added to the National Register of Historic Places in 1971.
