= Pineview (Roxobel, North Carolina) =

Historic house in North Carolina, United States

- U.S. National Register of Historic Places
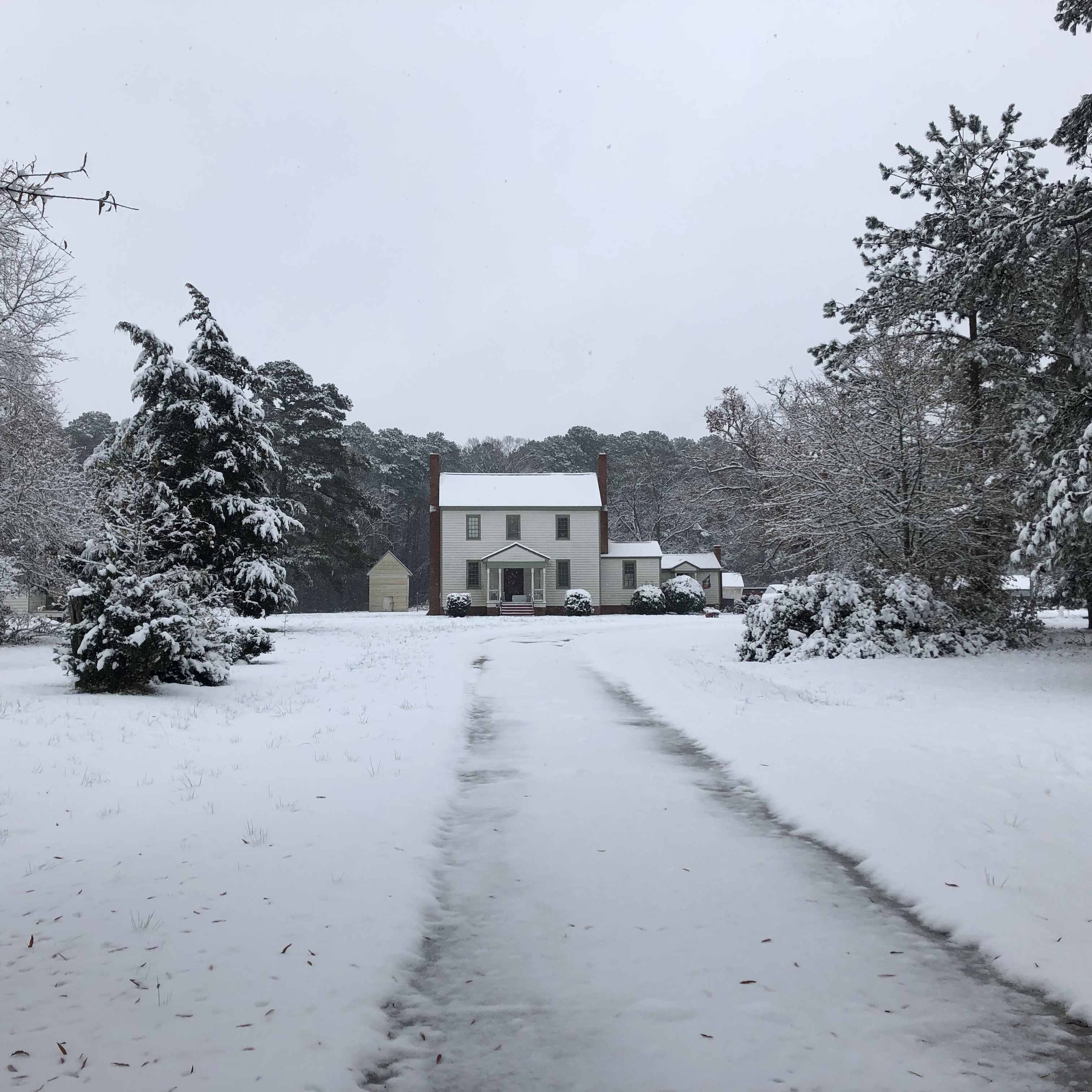
- Pineview in December 2018 snowfall

- Location within North Carolina Location within the United States
- Location: Off SR 1249, Roxobel, North Carolina
- Coordinates: 36°11′43″N 77°14′0″W
- Area: 6 acres (2.4 ha)
- Built: 1838, c. 1868, 1950
- Architectural style: Federal
- NRHP reference No.: 82003430
- Added to NRHP: June 28, 1982

Pineview, also known as Browne House, is an historic plantation house located near Roxobel, Bertie County, North Carolina. It was built about 1838, and is a two-story, three-bay, frame Federal-style dwelling with a hall-and-parlor plan. An exterior dining room, built about 1868, was attached to the house in 1950. Also on the property are the contributing smokehouse (circa 1830), office (circa 1850), kitchen (circa 1790), and dairy (circa 1865).

The buildings are constructed in heavy timber framing. The frames are created from large square cut, hewn beams and pegged together with round pegs in round holes to secure a solid, sturdy structure. The buildings are sheathed in heart pine weatherboard, and most rooms retain their original lathe and plaster finishing. The floors are "ship's lap" and are original throughout the 1830 main house. The windows retain their original sashes and frames and approximately 75% of the original glass.

The smokehouse is a dovetailed split log building of large size.

The plantation cemetery is on the property and contains the remains of persons who have lived at Pineview, slave and free.

The main house and outbuildings were restored and stabilized in 2010 by Lambeth Construction with the assistance and input of the North Carolina Department of Cultural Resources' office in Greenville, NC. The property is now occupied by the seventh generation of the Browne family since it was constructed by Joshua Brown(e) circa 1838.

It was added to the National Register of Historic Places in 1982.
