= Arwin D. Smallwood =

American historian

Arwin D. Smallwood is an American historian who chairs the history department at North Carolina A&T and has written about U.S. history. He was a professor at Bradley University in the 1990s, Brandeis University from 2001 to 2003 and was then a professor at the University of Memphis for years.

He grew up in Bertie County, North Carolina and participated in the Upward Bound program. He studied at North Carolina Central University and Ohio State University. He studied and photographed the Indian Woods of Bertie County where the first reservation was established to hold Native Americans. East Carolina University has a collection of his papers documenting Bertie County for his book on the area.

He was inducted into the African American Hall of Fame Museum in Peoria, Illinois. He is a member of Pi Gamma Mu.

== Writings ==
- Bertie County: An Eastern Carolina History (2002)
- Blacks at Bradley, 1897-2000
- Mapping Native American History
- The Atlas of African-American History and Politics: From the Slave Trade to Modern with Jeffrey M. Elliot ISBN 9780070584365
