= William H. Lee House =

Historic house in North Carolina, United States

- U.S. National Register of Historic Places
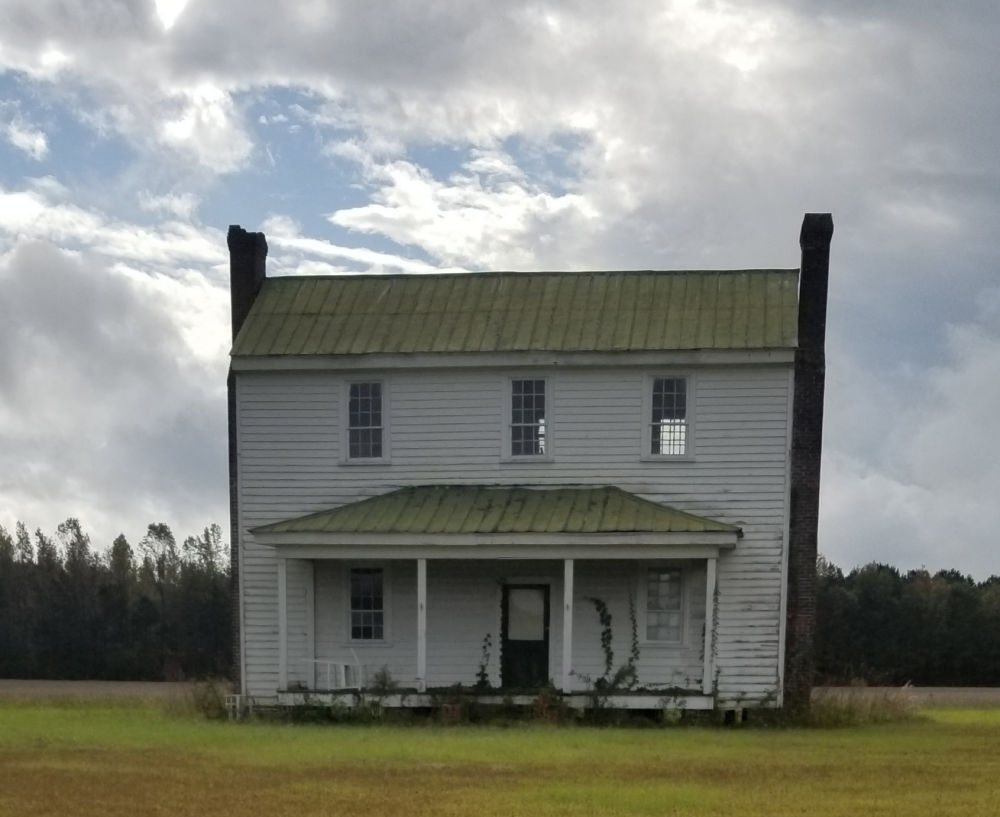

- Location within North Carolina Location within the United States
- Location: 246 Farm Rd. Lewiston, North Carolina
- Coordinates: 36°08′33″N 77°08′29″W
- Area: .85 acres (0.34 ha)
- Built: c. 1820
- Architectural style: I-house, Federal
- NRHP reference No.: 12000213
- Added to NRHP: April 16, 2012

William H. Lee House, also known as Billy Lee Farm, is a historic home located at Lewiston, Bertie County, North Carolina. It was built about 1820, and is a two-story, three-bay, hall and parlor plan frame Federal style I-house. It has a side gable roof and rests on a brick pier foundation.

It was added to the National Register of Historic Places in 2012.
