= Jordan House (Windsor, North Carolina) =

Historic house in North Carolina, United States

- U.S. National Register of Historic Places
- Location within North Carolina Location within the United States
- Location: South of Windsor on SR 1522, near Windsor, North Carolina
- Coordinates: 35°53′28″N 76°57′25″W
- Area: 8 acres (3.2 ha)
- Built: c. 1738
- NRHP reference No.: 71000569
- Added to NRHP: August 26, 1971

Jordan House is a historic home located near Windsor, Bertie County, North Carolina. It was built about 1738, and is a one-story, Quaker plan brick dwelling with a gable roof. It features two interior T-stack end chimneys. The interior was destroyed by fire in 1928.

It was added to the National Register of Historic Places in 1971.
