= George H. Throop =

American schoolteacher and novelist

George Higby Throop (c. 1818 – March 2, 1896) (born Higby Throop) was an American schoolteacher and novelist. Under the pseudonym Gregory Seaworthy he wrote three novels, Nag's Head: or, Two Months among "The Bankers." A Story of Sea-Shore Life and Manners; Bertie: or, Life in the Old Field. A Humorous Novel; and Lynde Weiss. The first of these was the first novel in the United States to deal with then-contemporary life in North Carolina.

== Life and career ==
Throop was a native of Willsboro, New York; his father, George Throop Sr., was a manufacturer and storekeeper, whose second wife, George, Jr.'s mother, died soon after giving birth to the boy. Initially named "Higby", he later took his father's first name as his own. He was a student of classics and an avid reader from youth. Throop attended the University of Vermont for one year, from 1835 to 1836, and may have attended another college afterwards. He married, unhappily, and soon the union broke up. Following this, he spent much of the 1840s as a schoolmaster and mariner.

Throop is known to have come to the coastal plains of North Carolina by 1849, and he may have traveled there earlier. It is possible that he taught at a plantation near Hertford, but by March of that year he had moved to Scotch Hall, the plantation of Cullen Capehart located near Merry Hill in Bertie County. He remained there until October; during the summer he accompanied the family and servants to Nags Head, where the Capeharts had a summer residence. He then is supposed to have spent some time in Philadelphia overseeing the publication of his novels.

Throop was not a success as a writer, and continued to work as a schoolmaster, traveling wherever he could find a position. He is known to have been in Georgia in 1853, but by the American Civil War he had settled in what would later become Hampshire County, West Virginia. There he was a well-liked member of the community, an accomplished singer, composer, and lyricist; however, suffering from alcoholism, he eventually ceased teaching. Around 1888 he discovered a previously unknown son from Boston, Massachusetts; the man, Edward H. Palmer, had taken his stepfather's name. Palmer gave his father twenty dollars a month, which allowed Throop to board with various inhabitants of Bloomery, the town in which he had last taught, until his death.

Throop is memorialized by a state historic marker indicating the location of Scotch Hall and noting his authorship of Bertie. The marker is along U.S. Route 17 in Bertie County, about eight miles southeast of the house itself, which still stands and is listed on the National Register of Historic Places.

== Works ==
=== Nag's Head ===
Throop's first book, published under the pseudonym "Gregory Seaworthy" in 1850, was the novel Nag's Head; or, Two Months Among "The Bankers": A Story of Sea-Shore Life and Manners, based on his time with the Capeharts at their summer residence. It was published in Philadelphia by A. Hart, but bears a dedication signed from Merry Hill. Strictly speaking, the book is not a novel, but rather a memoir, in fictional form, of Throop's summer on the Outer Banks. The book has no plot, and no sustained characterization, but is valuable for capturing the spirit of a seaside vacation of the era and for offering glimpses of the region, its natives, and its lore. It was also the first novel concerned with contemporary North Carolina life.

Gregory Seaworthy is presented as the narrator of the book; he is described as a Northerner, a former sailor, tutor to the children of a planter. He is said to be familiar with North Carolina literature, alluding to several other writers from the state, such as Calvin Henderson Wiley. Seaworthy records local history and folklore, and provides his impressions of the people and customs he sees. He also describes shipping traffic, ferries and schooners, along the coast and sound. The book is claimed to be a story of life among inhabitants of the Outer Banks, but very little is said about them; the narrator concerns himself chiefly with the planter population and their recreational activities, including swimming, fishing, and dancing.

Nag's Head received scant literary attention, but it was noticed by Washington Irving, who sent Throop a letter expressing interest in the book. More recently, the book has been praised for its value as social history and for its humor. It was republished in 1958 with an introduction by Richard Walser.

=== Bertie ===
Irving's letter, coupled with a handful of other favorable notices, inspired Throop to try his hand at a second work of fiction. This was the novel Bertie: or, Life in the Old Field. A Humorous Novel, which was published in 1851, again in Philadelphia and again by A. Hart; Irving's letter was presented as a preface to the book in the first edition.

The narrator of the novel is the same "Gregory Seaworthy" introduced in Nag's Head, but his history has been changed to make him the nephew of John Smallwood, an actual planter in the county. Other members of the Smallwood family are based on the Capeharts, with whom he had worked; the family home, "Cypress Shore", is almost certainly based on Scotch Hall. The plot of the novel concerns six couples and their various romantic adventures, but large swaths of the work are given over to descriptions of antebellum plantation society in the state and other bits of local color, such as holiday festivals and another summer trip to the sea. Cypress Shore is described in detail, as are neighboring estates, and much time is spent discussing their agricultural operations and products.

Much of the romantic action of the book is centered on "Professor" Funnyford Matters, a "Practical Hydrologist" from the North who builds cisterns for drinking water on local plantations. Matters is a typical "Yankee" caricature, full of negative assumptions about the South and frequently claiming that the north is superior. He also weighs in on slavery, stating that Northern claims about its injustice are exaggerations and claiming further that southern masters are too tolerant; he also observes that the sternest of plantation overseers are actually Northerners.

Bertie received a number of favorable notices; a reviewer for Godey's Lady's Book called it "one of the best American novels of the day". Even so, the work soon disappeared almost completely in the North. In North Carolina, it received almost no notice at all, even upon first publication.

=== Lynde Weiss ===
Throop's third and last novel, Lynde Weiss: An Autobiography, was brought out under his own name in Philadelphia by Lippincott, Grambo and Company in 1852. It contains no references to North Carolina.

== Death ==
He died on March 2, 1896, in the village of Bloomery, Hampshire County, West Virginia.
