= Rosefield (Windsor, North Carolina) =

Historic house in North Carolina, United States

- U.S. National Register of Historic Places
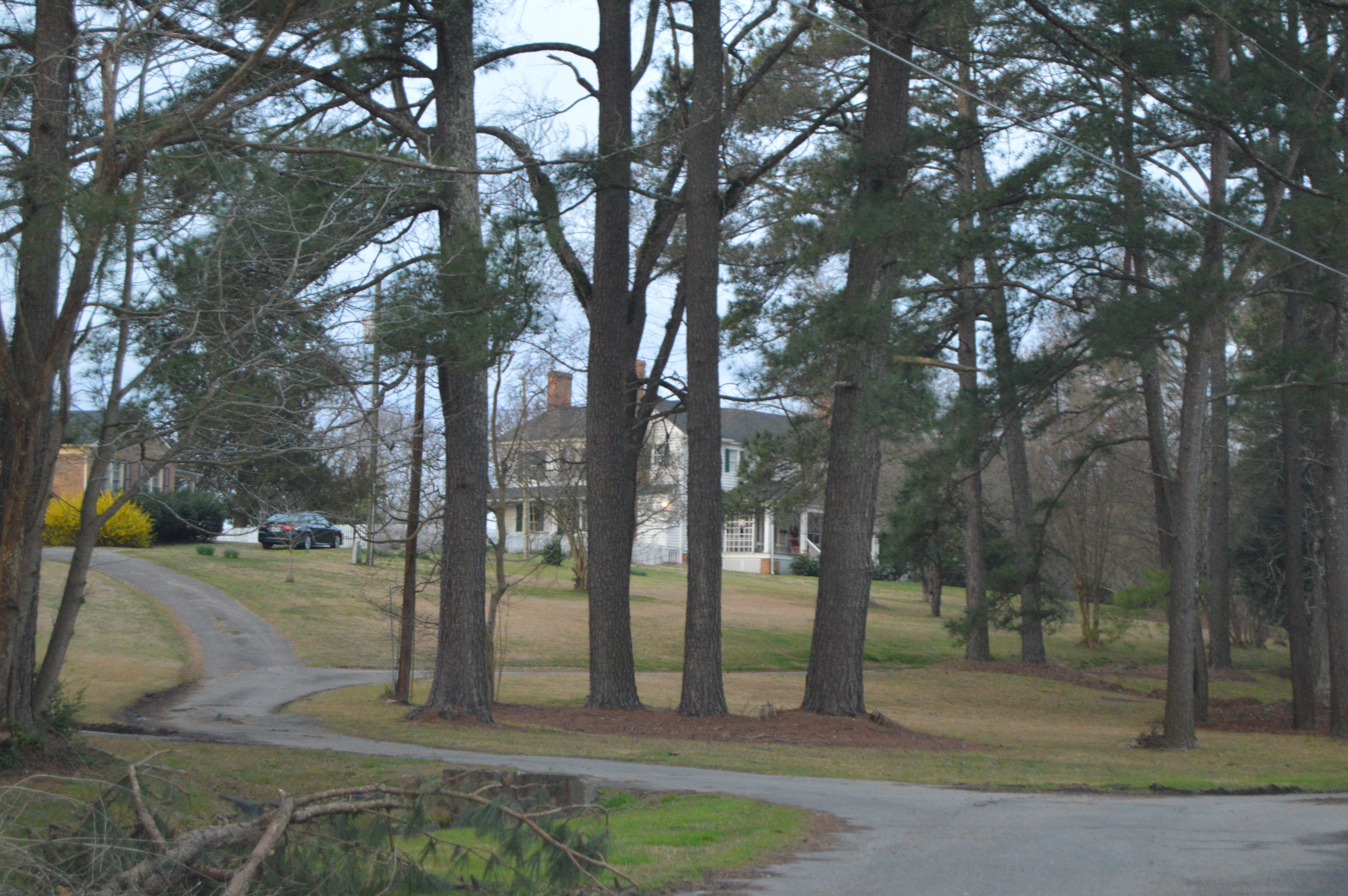
- Entrance from Gray Street

- Location within North Carolina Location within the United States
- Location: 212 W. Gray St., Windsor, North Carolina
- Coordinates: 35°59′42″N 76°56′50″W
- Area: 76 acres (31 ha)
- Built: c. 1786-1791, 1855
- Architect: Gilbert Leigh
- Architectural style: Federal, Georgian, Greek Revival
- NRHP reference No.: 82003434
- Added to NRHP: August 26, 1982

Rosefield is a historic plantation house located at Windsor, Bertie County, North Carolina. It was built in three sections, with the oldest built about 1786–1791. It is a two-story, five-bay, L-plan frame dwelling with Georgian, Federal, and Greek Revival style design elements. It has a two-story, two-bay addition and a two-story rear addition built in 1855. It features a hip roof front porch. Also on the property are the contributing small frame outbuilding, office, dairy, and family cemetery.

The house was named for the fact a bed of wild roses grew at the original site.

It was added to the National Register of Historic Places in 1982.
