= Woodbourne (Roxobel, North Carolina) =

Historic house in North Carolina, United States

- U.S. National Register of Historic Places
- Location within North Carolina Location within the United States
- Location: West of Roxobel on SR 1139, near Roxobel, North Carolina
- Coordinates: 36°11′15″N 77°15′54″W
- Area: 4 acres (1.6 ha)
- Built: c. 1810, 1819
- Built by: Norfleet, Thomas Figuers
- NRHP reference No.: 71000568
- Added to NRHP: August 26, 1971

Woodbourne is a historic plantation house located near Roxobel, Bertie County, North Carolina. The two-story, frame main block was built about 1810, with one-story frame wings added in 1819. The front facade features a temple form, two-story, three-bay central pedimented pavilion. It is sheathed in weatherboard and sits on a brick foundation. Also on the property is a contributing dairy.

It was added to the National Register of Historic Places in 1971.
