= Woodville (surname) =

Woodville is an English surname. Notable people with this surname include the following:

The English noble family:

- Elizabeth Woodville (c. 1437–1492), queen-consort of King Edward IV of England
- Catherine Woodville, Duchess of Buckingham and Bedford, otherwise Katherine Wydeville (1458–1497), sister of Elizabeth
- Richard Woodville, 1st Earl Rivers (1405–1469), father of Elizabeth, Katherine, Anthony, and Richard (3rd earl)
- Anthony Woodville, 2nd Earl Rivers (c. 1440–1483), son of Richard Woodville (1st earl)
- Richard Woodville, 3rd Earl Rivers (1453–1491), son of Richard Woodville (1st earl)

(see also Category:Woodville family)

Others:

- William Woodville (1752–1805), British physician and botanist
- Richard Caton Woodville (1825–1855), American painter
- Richard Caton Woodville Jr. (1856–1927), English painter, son (posthumous) of Richard Caton Woodville
- Katherine Woodville (actress) (1938–2013), British film and television actress
