= Elmwood (Windsor, North Carolina) =

Historic house in North Carolina, United States

- U.S. National Register of Historic Places
- Location within North Carolina Location within the United States
- Location: West of Windsor on SR 1101, near Windsor, North Carolina
- Coordinates: 36°0′26″N 76°58′46″W
- Area: 15 acres (6.1 ha)
- Built: c. 1836, 1838-1863
- Architectural style: Greek Revival, Federal
- NRHP reference No.: 82003431
- Added to NRHP: June 8, 1982

Elmwood, also known as the Watson-Mardre House, is a historic plantation house located near Windsor, Bertie County, North Carolina. It was built about 1836, and expanded between 1838 and 1863. It is a two-story frame structure three bays wide and two deep, with Greek Revival and Federal style design elements. It has a gable roof. Also on the property are the contributing kitchen and dairy.

It was added to the National Register of Historic Places in 1982.
