= Woodville Township =

Woodville Township may refer to one of the following places in the United States:

- Woodville Township, Greene County, Illinois
- Woodville Township, Waseca County, Minnesota
- Woodville Township, Platte County, Nebraska
- Woodville Township, Sandusky County, Ohio
