= King-Freeman-Speight House =

Historic house in North Carolina, United States

- U.S. National Register of Historic Places
- Location within North Carolina Location within the United States
- Location: West of Republican on NC 308, near Republican, North Carolina
- Coordinates: 36°4′38″N 77°5′42″W
- Area: 3.3 acres (1.3 ha)
- Built: 1808-1828, 1907
- Architectural style: Federal
- NRHP reference No.: 82001280
- Added to NRHP: December 2, 1982

King-Freeman-Speight House, also known as Francis Speight House, is a historic plantation house located at Republican, Bertie County, North Carolina. It was built in two sections, with the oldest built between 1808 and 1828. The older section forms the basis of the current rear wing. About 1828, a 2 1/2-story, Federal style, side-hall plan was added at a right angle to the original structure. The house was enlarged and remodeled in 1907. It has a two-story, two-bay addition and a two-story rear addition built in 1855. It features a hip roof front porch. Also on the property are the contributing two smokehouses, the kitchen, and an office. Noted landscape artist Francis Speight was born in the house in 1896.

It was added to the National Register of Historic Places in 1982.
