= Oaklana =

Historic house in North Carolina, United States

- U.S. National Register of Historic Places
- Location within North Carolina Location within the United States
- Location: Northeast of Roxobel off SR 1249, near Roxobel, North Carolina
- Coordinates: 36°13′10″N 77°13′22″W
- Area: 5 acres (2.0 ha)
- Built: c. 1825
- Built by: Bazemore
- Architectural style: Federal
- NRHP reference No.: 82003429
- Added to NRHP: April 15, 1982

Oaklana is a historic plantation house located near Roxobel, Bertie County, North Carolina. It was built about 1825, and is a 2 1/2-story, frame Federal-style dwelling with a two-story rear ell. Also on the property are the contributing smokehouse and dairy.

It was added to the National Register of Historic Places in 1982.
