= Liberty Hall (Windsor, North Carolina) =

Historic house in North Carolina, United States

- U.S. National Register of Historic Places
- Location within North Carolina Location within the United States
- Location: Off SR 1108, near Windsor, North Carolina
- Coordinates: 35°52′59″N 77°3′9″W
- Area: 5 acres (2.0 ha)
- Built: c. 1855
- Built by: Pennoyser, S.L.
- Architectural style: Italianate
- NRHP reference No.: 82003433
- Added to NRHP: June 8, 1982

Liberty Hall, also known as Outlaw House, is a historic plantation house located near Windsor, Bertie County, North Carolina. It was built about 1855, and is a two-story, three-bay, frame dwelling with Italianate style design elements. It sits on a high brick basement. Also on the property is a contributing outbuilding.

It was added to the National Register of Historic Places in 1982.
