= Scotch Hall =

Historic house in North Carolina, United States

- U.S. National Register of Historic Places
- Location within North Carolina Location within the United States
- Location: East of Merry Hill on SR 1511, near Merry Hill, North Carolina
- Coordinates: 35°58′26″N 76°42′29″W
- Area: 17 acres (6.9 ha)
- Built: c. 1838
- Architectural style: Greek Revival, Federal
- NRHP reference No.: 82003428
- Added to NRHP: April 29, 1982

Scotch Hall is a historic plantation house located near Merry Hill, Bertie County, North Carolina. It was built about 1838, and is a large 2 1/2-story, five bay by four bay, frame dwelling in a transitional Federal / Greek Revival style.

It was added to the National Register of Historic Places in 1982.

George H. Throop lived at Scotch Hall for a time in 1849 and served as tutor to the children of the family who lived there. His experiences were the basis for two novels, Nag's Head and Bertie, in which Scotch Hall is depicted as the plantation "Cypress Shore".
