= Windsor, North Carolina =

- Town
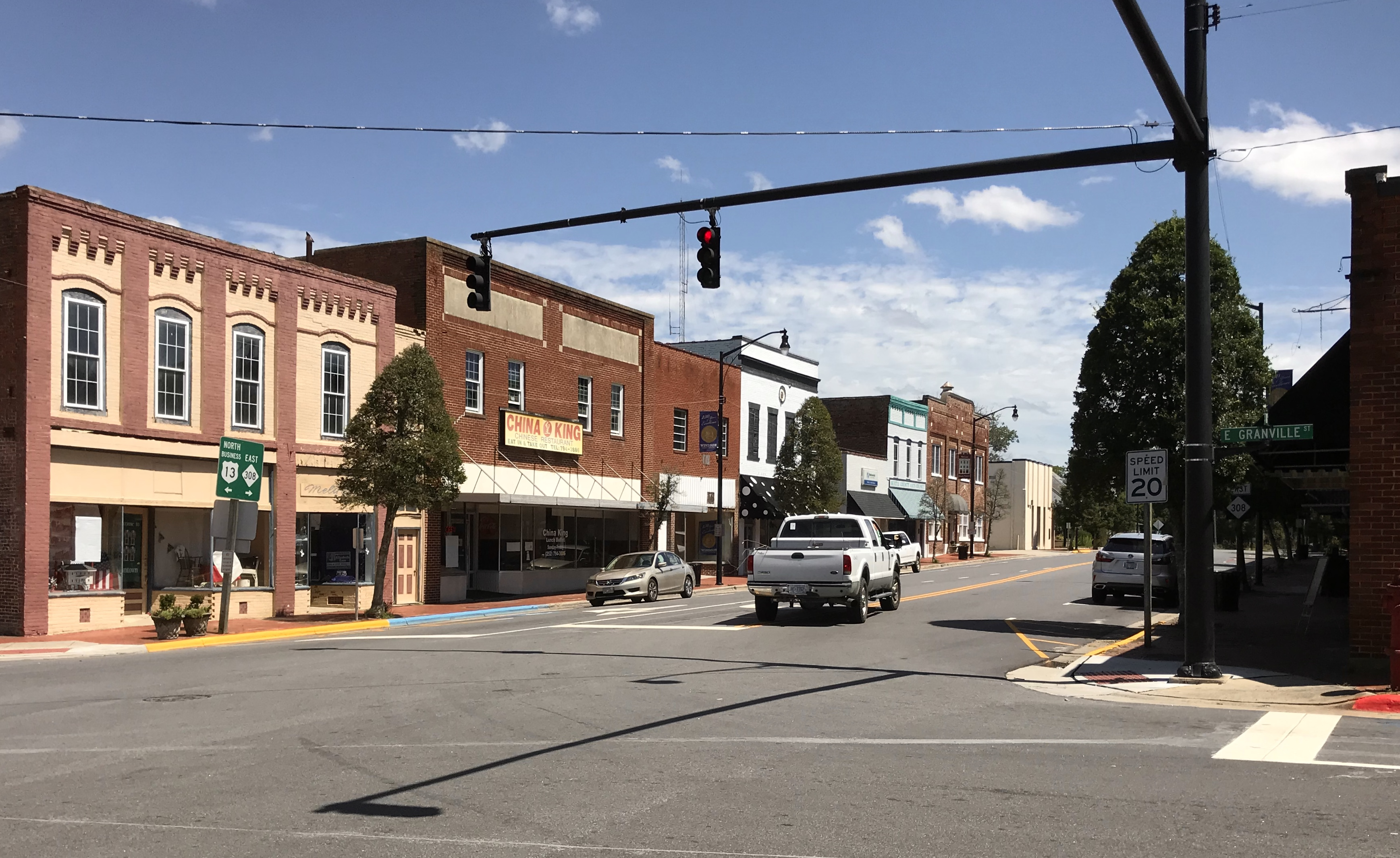
- South King Street

- Seal Logo

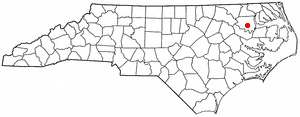
- Location of Windsor, North Carolina
- Coordinates: 35°59′35″N 76°56′24″W
- Country: United States
- State: North Carolina
- County: Bertie

Area
  - Total: 2.81 sq mi (7.29 km^{2})
  - Land: 2.81 sq mi (7.29 km^{2})
  - Water: 0 sq mi (0.00 km^{2})
- Elevation: 0 ft (0 m)

Population (2020)
  - Total: 3,582
  - Density: 1,272.3/sq mi (491.22/km^{2})
- Time zone: UTC-5 (Eastern (EST))
  - Summer (DST): UTC-4 (EDT)
- ZIP code: 27983 27959
- Area code: 252
- FIPS code: 37-74680
- GNIS feature ID: 2406899
- Website: windsornc.com

Windsor is a town established by an act of the Colonial Assembly in 1768, on the site known as Gray’s Landing and is the county seat of Bertie County, North Carolina, United States. As of the 2020 census, Windsor had a population of 3,582. Windsor is located in North Carolina's Inner Banks region.

== History ==
The land was historically the home of the Tuscarora people. Today, there are Tuscarora residents living in the village of Tandequemuc, now called Merry Hill.

Bertie County Courthouse, Bertie Memorial Hospital, Elmwood, Freeman Hotel, Hope Plantation, Jordan House, King House, Liberty Hall, Rosefield, and Windsor Historic District are listed on the National Register of Historic Places.

In 2013, Windsor was the subject of a documentary film, If You Build It, chronicling a year in the life of an innovative Bertie County design-based high school program, culminating with the design and sixteen-week construction of an open air pavilion for a farmers market in Windsor — the only farmers market pavilion in the U.S. designed and built by high school students. The pavilion was constructed adjacent the Roanoke/Cashie River Center at 11407 Windsor Blvd, Windsor (alternatively 12 West Water Street, Windsor) and as of 2025 is managed by the Good Shephard Food Pantry. It is generally open on Fridays, May through August, and works with the River Center for special events, including an annual fireworks celebration.

On the morning of August 4, 2020, an EF3 tornado spawned by Hurricane Isaias struck areas just outside of Windsor, completely destroying 12 mobile homes in a mobile home park outside of town and flattening one poorly built wood-framed house. As the strongest tropical cyclone-spawned tornado since 2005, the tornado killed two and injured 14 people. The North Carolina Governor toured the damage area in the days following the event.

== Recreation ==
Windsor is a notable Inner Banks kayaking destination. Canoes and kayaks are offered, by the Town of Windsor and the Roanoke Cashie River Center to use on the generally calm waters of the Cashie River.

=== Town of Windsor Parks and Recreation Department Facilities ===
- Livermon Park and Mini Zoo
- Cashie Wetlands Walk and Canoe Trail
- Craftsman and Farmers Museum
- Hoggard Mill Road Bridge Access
- Cashie River Campground
- Cashie Disk Golf Course
- Cashie River Tree Houses

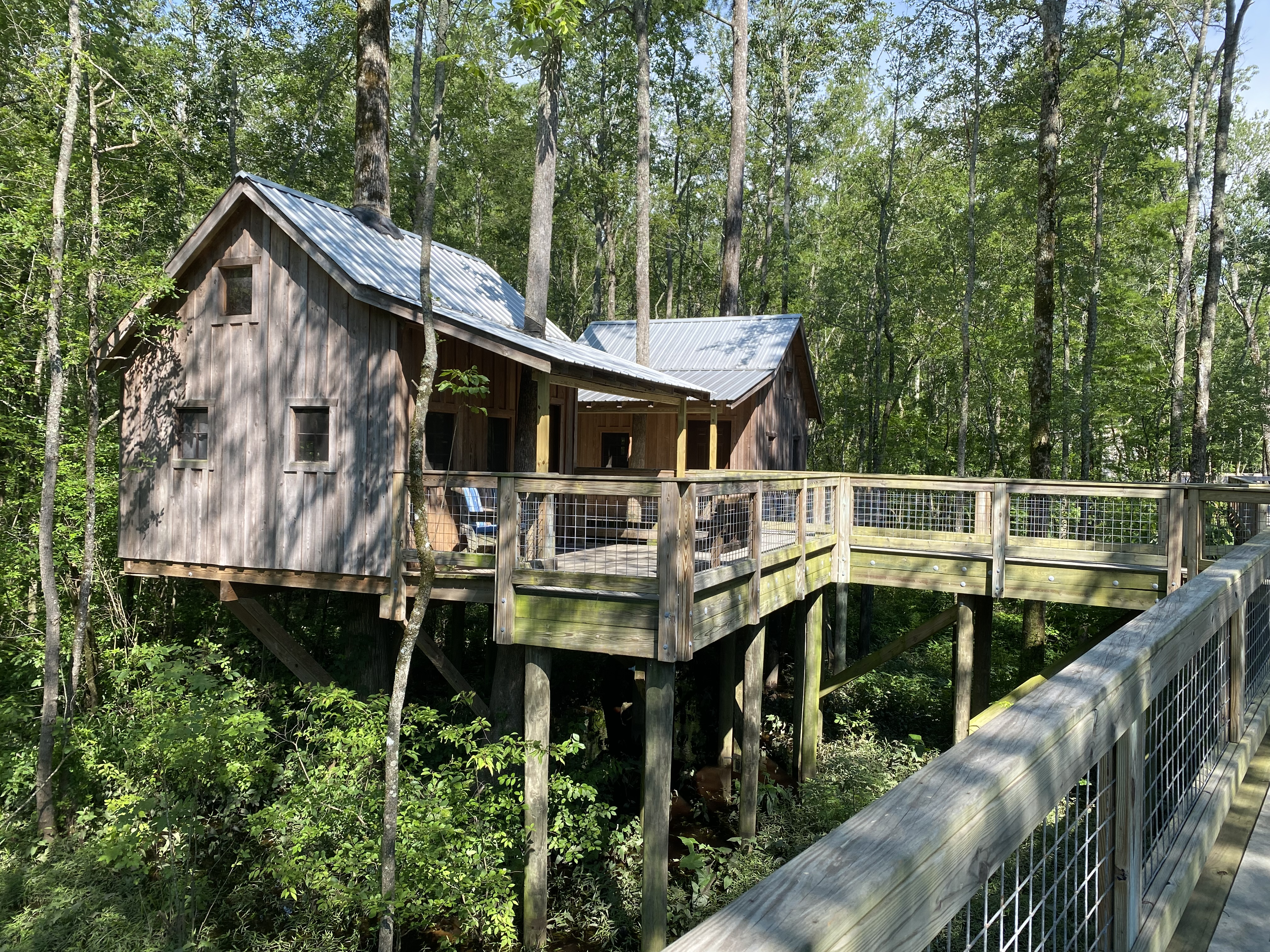
Tree house campground on the Cashie River in Windsor, NC

- Windsor Tennis Courts
- Rotary Park
- Tuscarora village of Tandequemuc Longhouse
- Williford Park
- Cashie River ADAAG Fishing Piers and ADAAG Small Boat Launch and Trail

== Geography ==
According to the United States Census Bureau, the town has a total area of 2.8 square miles (7.3 km^{2}), all of it land.

== Demographics ==
Historical population
Census	Pop.	Note	%±
1860	315		—
1870	427		35.6%
1890	522		—
1900	597		14.4%
1910	684		14.6%
1920	1,210		76.9%
1930	1,425		17.8%
1940	1,747		22.6%
1950	1,781		1.9%
1960	1,813		1.8%
1970	2,199		21.3%
1980	2,126		−3.3%
1990	2,056		−3.3%
2000	2,283		11.0%
2010	3,630		59.0%
2020	3,582		−1.3%
U.S. Decennial Census

=== Racial and ethnic composition ===
Windsor town, North Carolina – Racial and ethnic composition Note: the US Census treats Hispanic/Latino as an ethnic category. This table excludes Latinos from the racial categories and assigns them to a separate category. Hispanics/Latinos may be of any race.
Race / Ethnicity (NH = Non-Hispanic)	Pop 2000	Pop 2010	Pop 2020	% 2000	% 2010	% 2020
White alone (NH)	1,035	1,173	1,137	45.34%	32.31%	31.74%
Black or African American alone (NH)	1,206	2,264	2,188	52.83%	62.37%	61.08%
Native American or Alaska Native alone (NH)	8	25	29	0.35%	0.69%	0.81%
Asian alone (NH)	15	71	39	0.66%	1.96%	1.09%
Native Hawaiian or Pacific Islander alone (NH)	1	0	0	0.04%	0.00%	0.00%
Other Race alone (NH)	0	1	8	0.00%	0.03%	0.22%
Mixed race or Multiracial (NH)	10	56	101	0.44%	1.54%	2.82%
Hispanic or Latino (any race)	8	40	80	0.35%	1.10%	2.23%
Total	2,283	3,630	3,582	100.00%	100.00%	100.00%

=== 2020 census ===
As of the 2020 census, Windsor had a population of 3,582. The median age was 39.2 years. 11.3% of residents were under the age of 18 and 17.6% were 65 years of age or older. For every 100 females, there were 188.9 males, and for every 100 females age 18 and over, there were 208.4 males.

0.0% of residents lived in urban areas, while 100.0% lived in rural areas.

There were 977 households in Windsor, including 641 families. Of all households, 26.2% had children under the age of 18 living in them, 34.6% were married-couple households, 18.1% were households with a male householder and no spouse or partner present, and 43.2% were households with a female householder and no spouse or partner present. About 38.1% of all households were made up of individuals, and 19.7% had someone living alone who was 65 years of age or older.

There were 1,157 housing units, of which 15.6% were vacant. The homeowner vacancy rate was 2.5% and the rental vacancy rate was 5.8%.

=== 2000 census ===
As of the census of 2000, there were 2,283 people, 938 households, and 605 families residing in the town. The population density was 925.6 people per square mile (357.4 people/km^{2}). There were 1,080 housing units at an average density of 437.9 per square mile (169.1/km^{2}). The racial makeup of the town was 52.96% African American, 45.42% White, 20.35% Native American, 2.66% Asian, 0.04% Pacific Islander, 0.13% from other races, and 0.44% from two or more races. Hispanic or Latino of any race were 0.35% of the population.

In 2006, the State of North Carolina Department of Public Safety opened the Bertie Correctional Institution on Cooper Hill Road near Windsor. BCI is a close-security prison with the capacity to house up to 1,504 inmates. The new prisoners contributed to the sudden growth in Windsor's population between the 2000 and 2010 census.

There were 938 households, out of which 28.5% had children under the age of 18 living with them, 42.2% were married couples living together, 20.3% had a female householder with no husband present, and 35.5% were non-families. 33.8% of all households were made up of individuals, and 17.0% had someone living alone who was 65 years of age or older. The average household size was 2.33 and the average family size was 2.96.

In the town, the population was spread out, with 24.8% under the age of 18, 5.5% from 18 to 24, 24.1% from 25 to 44, 24.1% from 45 to 64, and 21.4% who were 65 years of age or older. The median age was 42 years. For every 100 females, there were 75.9 males. For every 100 females age 18 and over, there were 69.9 males.

The median income for a household in the town was $25,256, and the median income for a family was $34,107. Males had a median income of $30,045 versus $20,885 for females. The per capita income for the town was $18,006. About 19.9% of families and 25.8% of the population were below the poverty line, including 35.1% of those under age 18 and 25.4% of those age 65 or over.

== Notable people ==
- Frank Ballance (1942–2019), Democratic member of the United States House of Representatives
- Kent Bazemore (born 1989), NBA player for the Atlanta Hawks
- William Blount (1749–1800), delegate to the Philadelphia Convention and Senator for Tennessee
- Norma Bonniwell King (1877–1961), architect
- Jasminius Wilsonni Rudolphus Grandy III (1919–2001), landscape architect
- David Outlaw (1806–1868), Whig member of the United States House of Representatives
- George Outlaw (1771–1825), member of the United States House of Representatives
- Bosh Pritchard (1919–1996), NFL halfback
- Jethro Pugh (1944–2015), NFL defensive tackle for the Dallas Cowboys
- Tootie Robbins (1958–2020), NFL offensive tackle
- Francis D. Winston (1857–1941), North Carolina Lt. Governor and judge
- George T. Winston (1852–1932), educator and university administrator, brother to Francis

== Education ==
- Bertie County Schools
- Bertie High School
- Bertie STEM High School
- Bertie Early College High School
- Heritage Collegiate Academy
