= Woodville Historic District (Woodville, Mississippi) =

Historic district in Mississippi, United States

- U.S. National Register of Historic Places
- U.S. Historic district
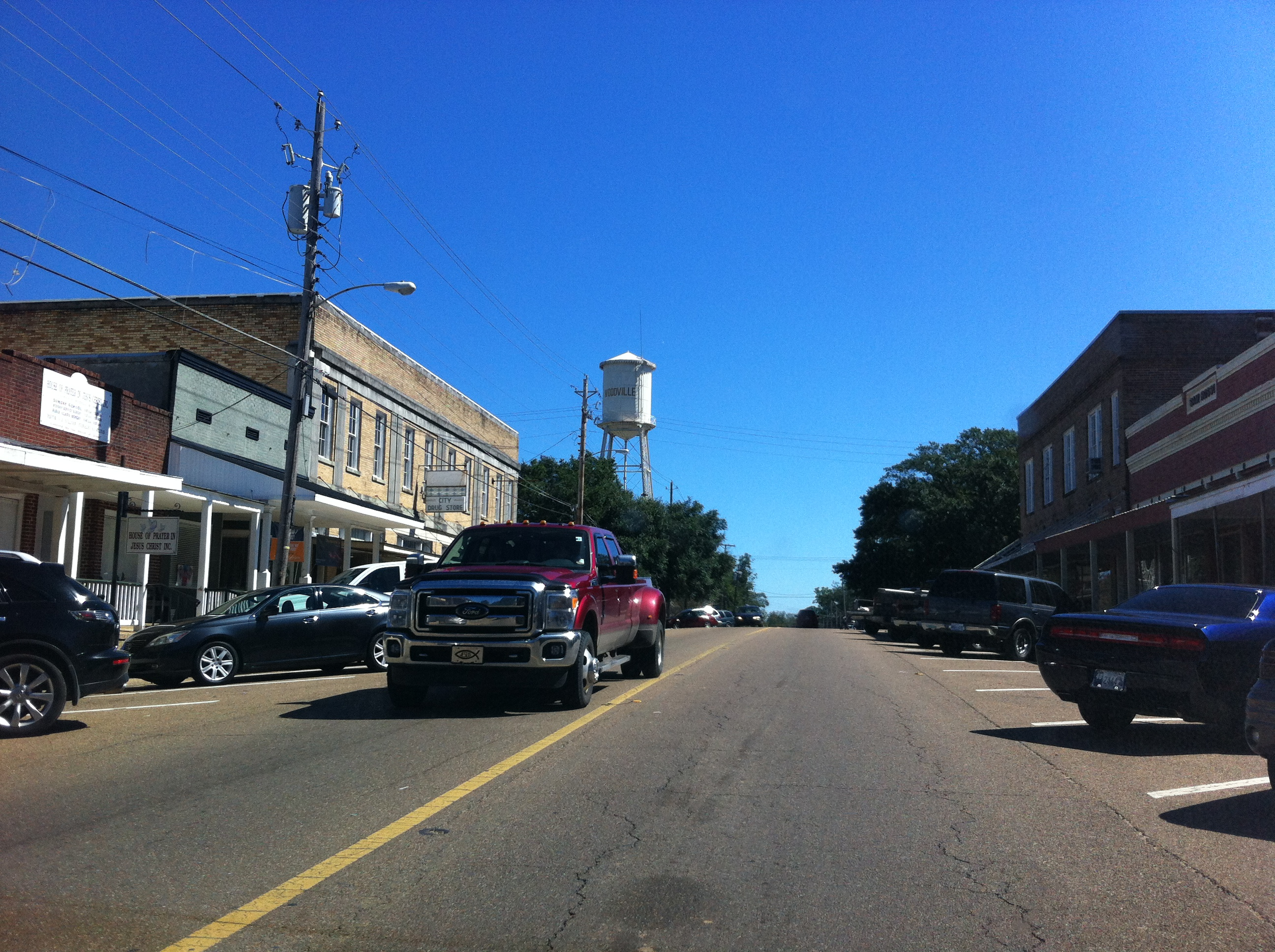

- Location within Mississippi Location within the United States
- Location: Roughly bounded by Prentiss, 2nd, College, Siglo, and Water Sts., original); 546 Depot St. and 559 Third St., (increase I), Roughly along Depot, First West, Main, Second South, Sligo, Third South, and Water Sts., (increase II) Roughly bounded by Old Prentiss Hwy., US 61 and City Limits, (increase III); Woodville, Mississippi
- Coordinates: 31°6′7″N 91°17′56″W
- Built: 1911 (increase I); 1816 (increase III)
- Architect: Multiple
- Architectural style: Classical Revival, Queen Anne, Federal (original); Classical Revival, Tudor Revival, et al. (increase III)
- NRHP reference No.: 82003122, 93001200, 99000594, 01001127
- Added to NRHP: September 30, 1982 (original); October 21, 1993 (increase I); May 20, 1999 (increase II); October 19, 2001 (increase III)

Woodville Historic District in Woodville, Mississippi is a historic district listed on the National Register of Historic Places. It was initially listed in 1982 and expanded on three later occasions. It includes Office and Banking House of West Feliciana Railroad, which is separately listed on the NRHP.
