= Woodville, Ontario County, New York =

Woodville, New York
- Hamlet
- Location within New York
- Coordinates: 42°40′11″N 77°21′51″W
- Country: United States
- State: New York
- County: Ontario
- Elevation: 689 ft (210 m)
- Time zone: UTC-5 (Eastern (EST))
  - Summer (DST): UTC-4 (EDT)
- Area code: 585
- GNIS feature ID: 971725

Woodville is a hamlet, in the town of Naples, Ontario County, New York, United States. It is located on the Canandaigua Lake. Parts of Woodville are in the town of South Bristol, New York.
