= Lewiston Woodville, North Carolina =

- Town
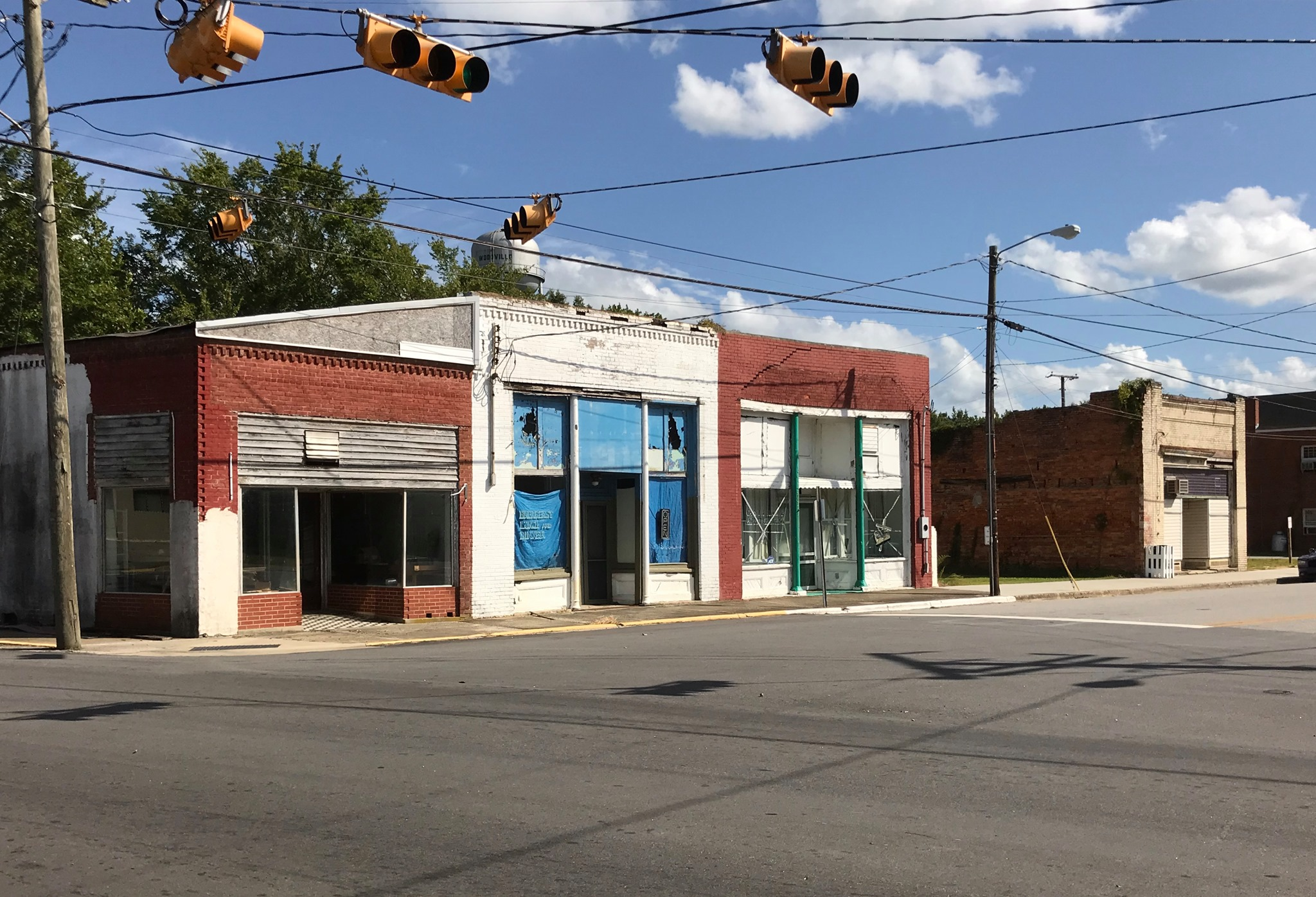
- Main Street

- Seal

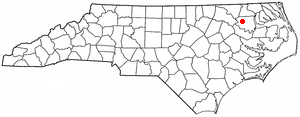
- Location of Lewiston Woodville, North Carolina
- Coordinates: 36°06′51″N 77°10′52″W
- Country: United States
- State: North Carolina
- County: Bertie

Area
  - Total: 1.97 sq mi (5.10 km^{2})
  - Land: 1.96 sq mi (5.07 km^{2})
  - Water: 0.012 sq mi (0.03 km^{2})
- Elevation: 75 ft (23 m)

Population (2020)
  - Total: 426
  - Density: 217.8/sq mi (84.09/km^{2})
- Time zone: UTC-5 (Eastern (EST))
  - Summer (DST): UTC-4 (EDT)
- ZIP code: 27849
- Area code: 252
- FIPS code: 37-38030
- GNIS feature ID: 2406010

Lewiston Woodville is a town in Bertie County, North Carolina, United States. As of the 2020 census, Lewiston Woodville had a population of 426. It is the location of Perdue Farms, one of the largest chicken-producing companies in North Carolina.

== History ==
Lewiston was named for an early settler. Lewiston and Woodville were formerly separate towns. They merged on July 1, 1981.

The St. Frances Methodist Church, Woodville Historic District, and William H. Lee House are listed on the National Register of Historic Places.

== Geography ==
According to the United States Census Bureau, the town has a total area of 2.0 square miles (5.1 km^{2}), of which 0.012 square miles (0.03 km^{2}), or 0.65%, is water.

Climate data for LEWISTON, NC (1991-2020 normals)
| Month | Jan | Feb | Mar | Apr | May | Jun | Jul | Aug | Sep | Oct | Nov | Dec | Year |
|---|---|---|---|---|---|---|---|---|---|---|---|---|---|
| Mean daily maximum °F (°C) | 50.8 (10.4) | 54.7 (12.6) | 62.1 (16.7) | 72.3 (22.4) | 78.9 (26.1) | 86.1 (30.1) | 89.1 (31.7) | 87.4 (30.8) | 81.8 (27.7) | 72.4 (22.4) | 62.1 (16.7) | 53.7 (12.1) | 70.9 (21.6) |
| Daily mean °F (°C) | 42.1 (5.6) | 44.8 (7.1) | 51.4 (10.8) | 61.0 (16.1) | 68.7 (20.4) | 76.4 (24.7) | 79.6 (26.4) | 78.2 (25.7) | 72.5 (22.5) | 62.0 (16.7) | 51.9 (11.1) | 44.8 (7.1) | 61.1 (16.2) |
| Mean daily minimum °F (°C) | 33.3 (0.7) | 34.8 (1.6) | 40.7 (4.8) | 49.6 (9.8) | 58.4 (14.7) | 66.8 (19.3) | 70.2 (21.2) | 69.0 (20.6) | 63.2 (17.3) | 51.7 (10.9) | 41.6 (5.3) | 35.8 (2.1) | 51.3 (10.7) |
| Average precipitation inches (mm) | 3.67 (93) | 3.18 (81) | 3.99 (101) | 3.53 (90) | 3.41 (87) | 4.55 (116) | 5.66 (144) | 5.16 (131) | 6.35 (161) | 3.47 (88) | 3.20 (81) | 3.31 (84) | 49.48 (1,257) |
| Average snowfall inches (cm) | 0.3 (0.76) | 0.3 (0.76) | 0.0 (0.0) | 0.0 (0.0) | 0.0 (0.0) | 0.0 (0.0) | 0.0 (0.0) | 0.0 (0.0) | 0.0 (0.0) | 0.0 (0.0) | 0.0 (0.0) | 0.0 (0.0) | 0.6 (1.5) |
| Average precipitation days (≥ 0.01 in) | 10.1 | 9.0 | 9.7 | 8.9 | 9.5 | 9.5 | 11.0 | 9.6 | 9.3 | 7.3 | 8.1 | 9.4 | 111.4 |
| Average snowy days (≥ 0.1 in) | 0.2 | 0.1 | 0.0 | 0.0 | 0.0 | 0.0 | 0.0 | 0.0 | 0.0 | 0.0 | 0.0 | 0.0 | 0.3 |
Source: NOAA

== Demographics ==
Historical population
| Census | Pop. | Note | %± |
|---|---|---|---|
| 1890 | 373 | | — |
| 1900 | 163 | | −56.3% |
| 1910 | 262 | | 60.7% |
| 1920 | 244 | | −6.9% |
| 1930 | 412 | | 68.9% |
| 1940 | 304 | | −26.2% |
| 1950 | 339 | | 11.5% |
| 1960 | 360 | | 6.2% |
| 1970 | 327 | | −9.2% |
| 1990 | 788 | | — |
| 2000 | 613 | | −22.2% |
| 2010 | 549 | | −10.4% |
| 2020 | 426 | | −22.4% |
U.S. Decennial Census

=== Racial and ethnic composition ===
Lewiston Woodville town, North Carolina – Racial and ethnic composition Note: the US Census treats Hispanic/Latino as an ethnic category. This table excludes Latinos from the racial categories and assigns them to a separate category. Hispanics/Latinos may be of any race.
| Race / Ethnicity (NH = Non-Hispanic) | Pop 2000 | Pop 2010 | Pop 2020 | % 2000 | % 2010 | % 2020 |
|---|---|---|---|---|---|---|
| White alone (NH) | 196 | 77 | 61 | 31.97% | 14.03% | 14.32% |
| Black or African American alone (NH) | 406 | 448 | 339 | 66.23% | 81.60% | 79.58% |
| Native American or Alaska Native alone (NH) | 1 | 3 | 0 | 0.16% | 0.55% | 0.00% |
| Asian alone (NH) | 0 | 7 | 0 | 0.00% | 1.28% | 0.00% |
| Native Hawaiian or Pacific Islander alone (NH) | 0 | 0 | 0 | 0.00% | 0.00% | 0.00% |
| Other race alone (NH) | 1 | 1 | 0 | 0.16% | 0.18% | 0.00% |
| Mixed race or Multiracial (NH) | 2 | 2 | 15 | 0.33% | 0.36% | 3.52% |
| Hispanic or Latino (any race) | 7 | 11 | 11 | 1.14% | 2.00% | 2.58% |
| Total | 613 | 549 | 426 | 100.00% | 100.00% | 100.00% |

=== 2000 census ===
As of the census of 2000, there were 613 people, 239 households, and 152 families residing in the town. The population density was 310.7 people per square mile (120.0 people/km^{2}). There were 283 housing units at an average density of 143.5 per square mile (55.4/km^{2}). The racial makeup of the town was 32.46% White, 66.72% African American, 0.16% Native American, 0.16% Asian, 0.16% from other races, and 0.33% from two or more races. Hispanic or Latino of any race were 1.14% of the population.

There were 239 households, out of which 31.0% had children under the age of 18 living with them, 39.3% were married couples living together, 21.3% had a female householder with no husband present, and 36.0% were non-families. 31.8% of all households were made up of individuals, and 15.1% had someone living alone who was 65 years of age or older. The average household size was 2.56 and the average family size was 3.27.

In the town, the population was spread out, with 30.0% under the age of 18, 8.3% from 18 to 24, 24.5% from 25 to 44, 23.5% from 45 to 64, and 13.7% who were 65 years of age or older. The median age was 37 years. For every 100 females, there were 82.4 males. For every 100 females age 18 and over, there were 77.3 males.

The median income for a household in the town was $20,875, and the median income for a family was $26,389. Males had a median income of $26,354 versus $17,292 for females. The per capita income for the town was $12,911. About 28.2% of families and 31.5% of the population were below the poverty line, including 48.2% of those under age 18 and 17.7% of those age 65 or over.

== See also ==
- Woodville, North Carolina
