= Woodville, Henry County, Indiana =

Unincorporated community in Indiana, U.S.

Coordinates: 39°54′56″N 85°32′41″W

Woodville was a short-lived town in Henry County, Indiana, in the United States. It was laid out and platted in 1836 and was likely named from its wooded setting. There were never more than a few buildings, however, and by the early 1900s the place was abandoned.
