= Merry Hill, North Carolina =

Unincorporated community in North Carolina, US

Coordinates: 36°00′43″N 76°46′21″W

Merry Hill is a rural unincorporated community located in Merry Hill Township in Bertie County in the U.S. state of North Carolina. This area is composed of mostly farm land. Within the town there is one school, Lawrence Academy (Private), which was founded in 1968 and is located on Avoca Farm Road. In the middle of the town is the post office, with the zip code 27957. Avoca Incorporated is a large company, located where the original Avoca Plantation existed, that profits from botanical extraction. Salmon Creek twists and turns through the wooded area of Merry Hill and opens up to the Albemarle Sound. This is known as the Mouth of Salmon Creek. There is currently a golf course called Scotch Hall Preserve in Merry Hill, built in 2009, that overlooks the Mouth of Salmon Creek and reaches out into the Albemarle Sound. The course was designed by retired professional golfer Arnold Palmer.

== History ==
Most of the history took place in the southern part of Merry Hill known as Avoca. Avoca is Indian for "Meeting of the waters." Basically, it is the land between Black Walnut Swamp and the mouth of Salmon Creek which is at the juncture of Salmon Creek, Chowan River, and the Albemarle Sound.

In May 2012, the British Museum in London discovered evidence that the famed Lost Colony was planned to move to a fort in Avoca. A map owned by Lost Colony founder John White was scanned, and the symbol for a fort was found under a patch (see https://www.britishmuseum.org/research/search_the_collection_database/search_object_details.aspx?objectid=753203&partid=1). Some researchers believe that the surviving colonists may have moved to Avoca.

Avoca was in its earlier days owned by Seth Sothel, N.C. Governor. When he died it passed to a "kinsman Ardenne". At Ardenne's death it passed to his widow, and when she married the Tory Duckenfield, it passed into that name. Sir William Duckenfield and/or his mother, Mrs. Person lived there until her death circa 1780s. The land 36,000 acres (150 km^{2}) was sold as tory confiscated lands, and the money thus derived was used to open the University of North Carolina. Both Sothell and Duckenfield had trading posts on the mouth of Salmon Creek at Avoca prior to 1690.

Located in Merry Hill, the old Avoca Plantation was owned by the Cullen Capehart family for many years. His son, George Washington Capehart, built the nearby Scotch Hall. Avoca came from the Indian word, "where separate waters come together". The Dr. W. R. Capehart is buried there in the family cemetery. He was the Assistant Surgeon General in the Civil War (Confederate).

Recently laid to rest in the Avoca cemetery are the ashes of William Selby Harney, Jr. (1913–2010), grandson of Dr. William Rhodes Capehart, buried with the ashes of his beloved late wife, Jeanne Waugh Harney.

Horse racing took place and many years later this sport was one of the annual social events. Every fall at Avoca, Dr. Capehart's half mile enclosed ring attracted horses, sulkies and riders from miles around. His horse, a state winner, was named "Chapel Hill".

Although George and his father, Cullen, maintained separate households, it is believed that they worked their extensive plantations in partnership. At the time of the 1850 Census, Cullen Capehart owned 4,965 acres (20.1 km^{2}) of land valued at $48,800 on which his 203 slaves raised 8,500 bushels of corn, 200 bales of ginned cotton, and livestock worth $4,000.

In addition to the plantation, the Capeharts also operated a fishery off Batchelors Bay in the Albemarle Sound.[Laura Harrel, "Capehart's Fishery Era Recalled at Spring Historical Meeting"

There are many old pecan trees planted in the 19th century that are still there.

There is an old Episcopal church on one acre of land on Avoca Plantation. The land was donated by Dr. W. R. Capehart and named "The Church of the Holy Innocents" by the wife of Mr. Cadmus Capehart. It was consecrated on April 12, 1880 by the Rt. Rev. Theodore B. Lyman, Assistant Bishop of North Carolina. The Capehart family attended church there for years at the beginning. There was also a Capehart's School House there at one time. The Capehart's Baptist Church was organized in 1824, initially as Capehart's Meeting House.

George Capehart (son of "Buddy" George Capehart) and his sister, Sue Martin Capehart Hardy sold most of the farming land to the RJR Avoca Division. The Capehart family once owned the entire peninsula, 5,000 acres (20 km^{2}) fenced from Salmon Creek to Albemarle Sound. In recent years RJR sold the division and is now known as Avoca Incorporated.

Elmwood, The Hermitage, and Scotch Hall are listed on the National Register of Historic Places.

== Geography ==
According to the 2000 census, the town has a total area of 44.72/sq mi. The land area is 44.68/sq mi. The water area is 0.04/sq mi.

== Education ==
- Lawrence Academy

== Demographics ==
According to the 2000 census record there were 1,074 people, and 444 households. The population density was 24.0/sq mi. The housing unit density was 13.3/sq mi. The racial makeup of the town was 49.2% White, 50.2% African American, 0.3% Native American, 0.1% other, 0.3 two or more races.

Within the 444 households 25.0% had children under the age of 18, 49.5% had married couples living together, 17.1% were female householders with no husband present. 26.4% of the households were occupied by individuals and 12.8% were age 65 and older living alone. The average household size was 2.42 and the average family size was 2.90.
