= Woodville Historic District (Lewiston Woodville, North Carolina) =

Historic district in North Carolina, United States

- U.S. National Register of Historic Places
- U.S. Historic district
- Location within North Carolina Location within the United States
- Location: Roughly along NC 11, Lewiston Woodville, North Carolina
- Coordinates: 35°59′49″N 76°56′44″W
- Area: 161 acres (65 ha)
- Built: 1801-1927
- Architect: Moser, Philip B.; et.al.
- Architectural style: Georgian, Federal, Gothic Revival
- NRHP reference No.: 98001112
- Added to NRHP: August 28, 1998

Woodville Historic District is a national historic district located at Lewiston Woodville, Bertie County, North Carolina. It encompasses 36 contributing buildings and 3 contributing sites in the village of Woodville. They primarily date between 1801 and 1927, and include six pre-American Civil War houses, one antebellum church and 1870s rectory, two antebellum church cemeteries, and three early-20th century American Craftsman houses.

It was added to the National Register of Historic Places in 1998.
