= National Register of Historic Places listings in Perquimans County, North Carolina =

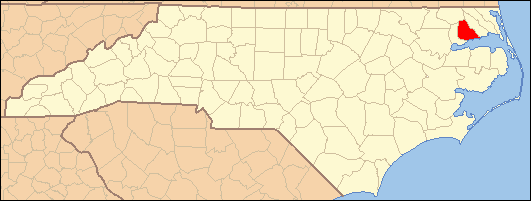

This list includes properties and districts listed on the National Register of Historic Places in Perquimans County, North Carolina. Click the "Map of all coordinates" link to the right to view an online map of all properties and districts with latitude and longitude coordinates in the table below.

== Current listings ==
This National Park Service list is complete through NPS recent listings posted March 14, 2025.

	Name on the Register	Image	Date listed	Location	City or town	Description
1	Belvidere	Belvidere	August 2, 1977 (#77001008)	NC 37, W of Perquimans River; 36°16′08″N 76°32′48″W	Belvidere	
2	Belvidere Historic District		June 4, 1999 (#99000600)	Roughly bounded by the Perquinmans R., NC 37, NC 1200, and NC 1213; 36°16′08″N 76°32′17″W	Belvidere	
3	Church of the Holy Trinity	Church of the Holy Trinity	June 11, 1998 (#98000688)	207 S. Church St. 36°11′14″N 76°28′00″W	Hertford	
4	Cove Grove	Cove Grove	August 7, 1974 (#74001366)	E of Hertford near SR 1301 and 1302; 36°11′02″N 76°25′02″W	Hertford	
5	Fletcher-Skinner-Nixon House and Outbuildings	Fletcher-Skinner-Nixon House and Outbuildings	January 21, 1994 (#93001541)	NC 1301 NE side, 0.45 miles SE of jct. with NC 1300; 36°11′45″N 76°25′45″W	Hertford	
6	Hertford Historic District	Hertford Historic District	October 22, 1998 (#98001264)	Roughly bounded by the Perquimans River and W. Academy St., Hyde St., and Dobbs St. 36°11′23″N 76°28′04″W	Hertford	
6	Hertford West Historic District		February 11, 2025 (#100011161)	Dobbs St., W. Grubb St.. Pennsylvania Ave., and adjacent streets to the west of W. Railroad Ave. 36°11′26″N 76°28′39″W	Hertford	
7	Jonathan Hill Jacocks House		April 1, 1998 (#98000276)	Jct. of New Hope Rd. and Jacocks Ln. 36°08′47″N 76°15′59″W	New Hope Township	
8	Land's End	Land's End	September 20, 1973 (#73001365)	SE of Hertford near jct. of SR 1300 and 1324; 36°06′40″N 76°13′17″W	Hertford	Home of Col. James Leigh (1781-1854)
9	Mitchell-Ward House	Mitchell-Ward House	June 25, 1999 (#99000716)	Jct. NC 1119 and NC 1002; 36°16′30″N 76°34′05″W	Belvidere	
10	Myers-White House	Myers-White House	January 20, 1972 (#72000986)	NE of Bethel on SR 1347; 36°07′12″N 76°26′58″W	Bethel	
11	Newbold-White House	Newbold-White House	June 24, 1971 (#71000615)	SE of Hertford off SR 1336; 36°10′00″N 76°26′15″W	Hertford	
12	Samuel Nixon House		October 15, 1973 (#73001366)	NW of Hertford on SR 1121; 36°13′03″N 76°29′45″W	Hertford	
13	Old Neck Historic District		September 6, 1996 (#96000929)	Roughly bounded by US 17, NC 1302, NC 1300, Suttons Cr., and the Perquimans River; 36°11′33″N 76°25′07″W	Hertford	
14	Perquimans County Courthouse	Perquimans County Courthouse	May 10, 1979 (#79001743)	Church St. 36°11′21″N 76°27′55″W	Hertford	
15	Stockton	Stockton	June 7, 1974 (#74001368)	S of Woodville; 36°12′57″N 76°19′06″W	Woodville	
16	Sutton-Newby House	Sutton-Newby House	September 10, 1974 (#74001367)	E of Hertford; 36°11′16″N 76°22′56″W	Hertford	
17	Isaac White House	Isaac White House	March 23, 1979 (#79001742)	NE of Bethel on SR 1339; 36°07′38″N 76°27′39″W	Bethel	
18	Winfall Historic District		January 15, 2003 (#02001715)	Roughly along Main St. and Wiggins Rd. 36°13′11″N 76°27′43″W	Winfall	

== See also ==
- National Register of Historic Places listings in North Carolina
- List of National Historic Landmarks in North Carolina
