= Nicanor =

Nicanor or Nikanor is a given name, and less commonly a surname. Notable people with these names include:

== Given name ==
=== Ancient history ===
- Nicanor (father of Balacrus), 4th century BC
- Nicanor (son of Parmenion) (4th-century–330 BC), 4th century BC; a Macedonian officer under Alexander
- Nicanor of Stageira, 4th century BC; a messenger sent by Alexander to the 324 Olympics
- Nicanor (satrap), 4th century BC; Macedonian officer, governor of Media under Antigonus
- Nicanor (Antipatrid general) (died 318 BC), 4th century BC; an officer of Cassandrus
- Nicanor (Ptolemaic general), 4th century BC
- Nicanor of Syria (died 222 BC), 3rd century BC; assassin of Seleucus III
- Nicanor (Macedonian general), 3rd century BC; a Macedonian general under Philip V
- Nicanor of Epirus, 3rd–2nd century BC; son of Myrton and supporter of Charops of Epirus
- Saevius Nicanor, 3rd or 2nd century BC; Roman grammarian
- Nicanor (Seleucid general) (died 161 BC), 2nd century BC; defeated by Judas Maccabaeus
- Nicanor of Cyrene, date unknown; author of the Metonomasias
- Nicanor the Deacon (died 76 AD), 1st century AD; one of the Seven Deacons of early Christianity
- Nicanor Stigmatias, 2nd century AD; the great Homeric grammarian

=== Modern period ===
- Nicanor Abelardo (1893–1934), Filipino composer who composed over a hundred of Kundiman songs, especially before the Second World War
- Nicanor Carmona (1842–1940), Peruvian politician in the early 20th century
- Nicanor de Carvalho (1947–2018), manager of the Kashiwa Reysol soccer team in Japan in the 1990s
- Nicanor Duarte (born 1956), President of Paraguay 2003–2008
- Nicanor Faeldon (born 1965), Captain in the Philippine Marines and an alleged leader of the Oakwood Mutiny in 2003
- Nikanor Grujić (1810–1887), Orthodox bishop, Serbian patriarch, writer, poet, orator and translator
- Nikanor Hoveka (c. 1875–1951), Chief of the Ovambanderu in South-West Africa
- Nikanor Longinov, Governor of Yekaterinoslav Governorate (1832–1836)
- Nicanor Costa Méndez (1922–1992), Foreign Minister of Argentina under Presidents Juan Carlos Onganía and Leopoldo Galtieri, and ambassador to Chile from 1962 to 1964
- Nicanor Perlas (born 1950), Filipino activist and a recipient of the Right Livelihood Award in 2003
- Nicanor Parra (1914–2018), Chilean antipoet
- Nicanor Tiongson, Filipino critic, creative writer and academic
- Nicanor Yñiguez (1915–2007), Filipino politician
- Nicanor Zabaleta (1907–1993), Basque-Spanish virtuoso and popularizer of the harp
- Nikanor Teratologen (born 1964), Swedish author, translator and critic
- Patriarch Nicanor of Alexandria from 1866 and 1869

== Surname ==
- Enrique Nicanor (1944–2025), Spanish television producer and director, and media designer

== See also ==
- Nicanor, North Carolina, an unincorporated community in the US
- Nikanor plc, in the Democratic Republic of Congo, former holding company merged into Katanga Mining which is now owned by Glencore
- Nicander (name)
