= Newbold–White House =

Historic house in North Carolina, United States

- U.S. National Register of Historic Places
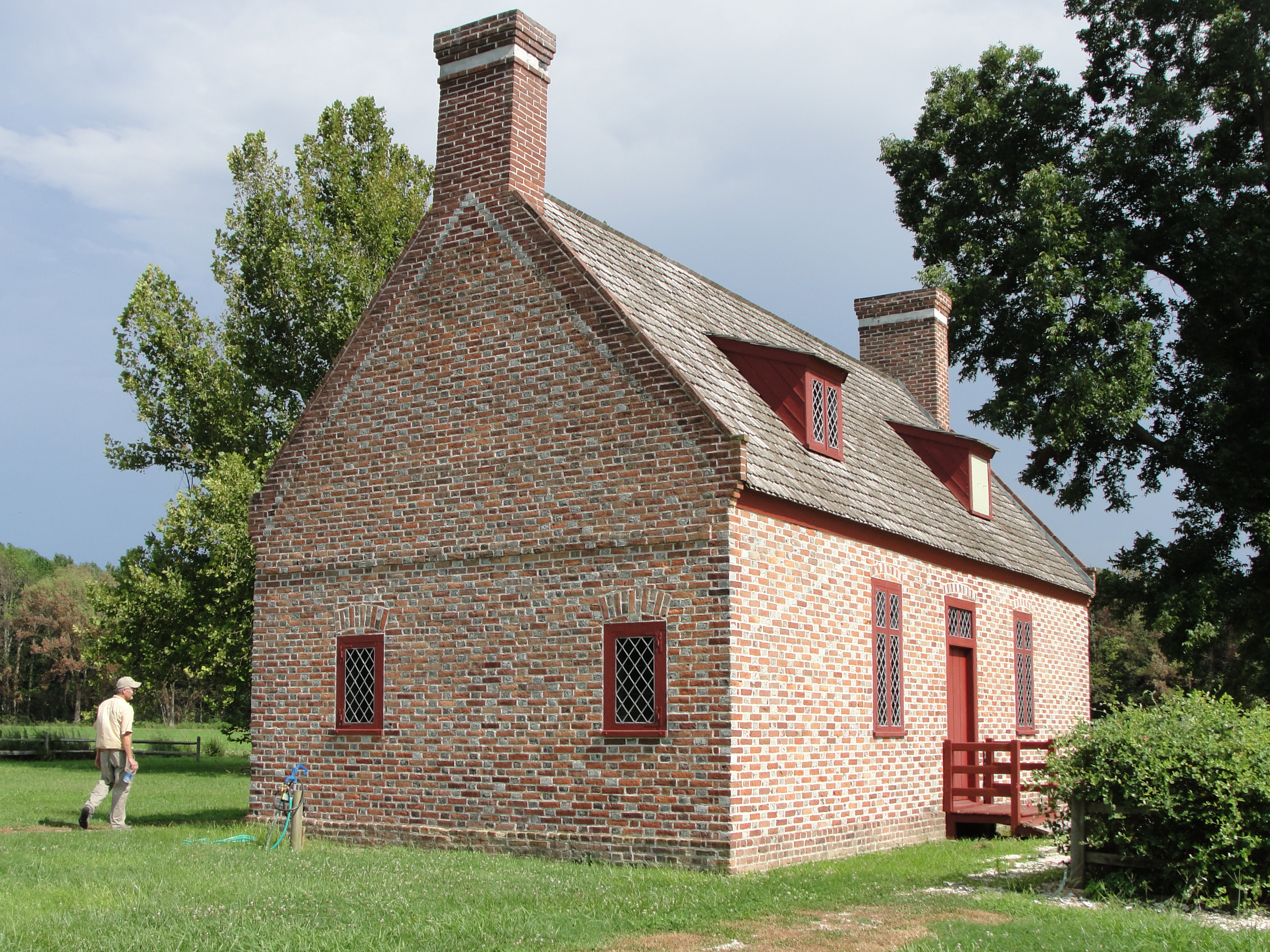

- Location within North Carolina Location within the United States
- Location: 152 Newbold White Road, Hertford, North Carolina
- Coordinates: 36°10′0″N 76°26′15″W
- Area: 8 acres (3.2 ha)
- Built: 1730
- NRHP reference No.: 71000615
- Added to NRHP: June 24, 1971

Newbold–White House is a historic house in Hertford, Perquimans County, North Carolina.

The brick house was built in 1730 by Abraham Sanders, a Quaker who purchased the property in 1726. His plantation on the Perquimans River produced corn, cotton, wheat, flax, indigo, tobacco, rice, and wood products. It is the oldest house in North Carolina that is open to the public. The brickwork is laid in Flemish bond.

The house was added to the National Register of Historic Places in 1971.

== See also ==
- List of the oldest buildings in North Carolina
