= Perquimans County High School =

American public school in North Carolina

Location
- 305 Edenton Road Street; Hertford, North Carolina 27944; United States
- Coordinates: 36°11′03″N 76°28′28″W

Information
- Type: Public high school
- School district: Perquimans County Schools
- CEEB code: 341805
- NCES School ID: 370360001475
- Principal: Wayne Price
- Faculty: 31.12 (on FTE basis)
- Grades: 9–12
- Enrollment: 518 (2022-23)
- Student to teacher ratio: 16.65
- Campus type: Rural
- Colors: Black and gold
- Nickname: Pirates
- Website: Perquimans County High School

Perquimans County High School is a public high school located in Hertford, North Carolina. It is the only high school in Perquimans County. Perquimans County High School's enrollment as of 2010 is 519 students. The student body is 59% White; 39% Black; 1% Hispanic; and 1% Asian.

In 2004 the school had almost 600 students. The school had built a gymnasium circa 1954. By 2004 it was outdated, so the school was building a new gymnasium facility.

== Notable alumni ==
- Catfish Hunter, former MLB pitcher and member of the National Baseball Hall of Fame
