= Perquimans County Schools =

School district in North Carolina, United States

Location
- 411 Edenton Road Street; Hertford, North Carolina 27944 United States
- Coordinates: 36.182203°N 76.474639°W

District information
- Type: Public school (government funded) / Rural
- Grades: PK-12
- Superintendent: Tanya Turner
- Asst. superintendent(s): James Bunch
- Schools: 4
- Budget: $18,709,000
- NCES District ID: 3703600

Students and staff
- Students: 1,824 as of 2010
- Teachers: 117.75 (on an FTE basis)
- Student–teacher ratio: 15.49

Other information
- Website: pqschools.org www.pcs.k12.nc.us

Perquimans County Schools is the public school district responsible for Perquimans County, North Carolina.

Its boundary is that of the county.

The district consists of four schools:

- Perquimans County Central School in Winfall serving grades PK-2
- Perquimans County Intermediate School in Hertford serving grades 3-8
- Perquimans County High School in Hertford serving grades 9-12
