= Winfall Historic District =

Historic district in North Carolina, United States

- U.S. National Register of Historic Places
- U.S. Historic district
- Location within North Carolina Location within the United States
- Location: Roughly along Main St. and Wiggins Rd., Winfall, North Carolina
- Coordinates: 36°13′11″N 76°27′43″W
- Area: 20 acres (8.1 ha)
- Built: 1881
- Architectural style: Queen Anne, Bungalow/craftsman
- NRHP reference No.: 02001715
- Added to NRHP: January 15, 2003

Winfall Historic District is a national historic district located at Winfall, near Hertford, Perquimans County, North Carolina. The district encompasses 72 contributing buildings and 1 contributing structure in the town of Winfall. The district developed between about 1860 and 1950, and includes notable examples of Queen Anne and Bungalow / American Craftsman style architecture. Notable buildings include the Epworth United Methodist Church, W.E. Speight House (c. 1888), the J.D. White House (c. 1890), the Alonzo R. Winslow House (c. 1894), the R.T. White House (1895), and the Jesse H. Baker House (c. 1920).

The house was added to the National Register of Historic Places in 2003.
