= New Hope, Perquimans County, North Carolina =

New Hope, North Carolina
- Unincorporated community
- Location within North Carolina Location within the United States
- Coordinates: 36°09′16″N 76°18′52″W
- Country: United States
- State: North Carolina
- County: Perquimans
- Elevation: 3 ft (0.91 m)
- Time zone: UTC-5 (Eastern (EST))
  - Summer (DST): UTC-4 (EDT)
- Area code: 252
- GNIS feature ID: 1025298

New Hope is an unincorporated community in Perquimans County, North Carolina, United States. The community is 8.8 miles (14.2 km) east-southeast of Hertford.

A variant name was "Durants Neck". Durants Neck was named after George Durant, a pioneer citizen.
