= Myers-White House =

Historic house in North Carolina, United States

- U.S. National Register of Historic Places
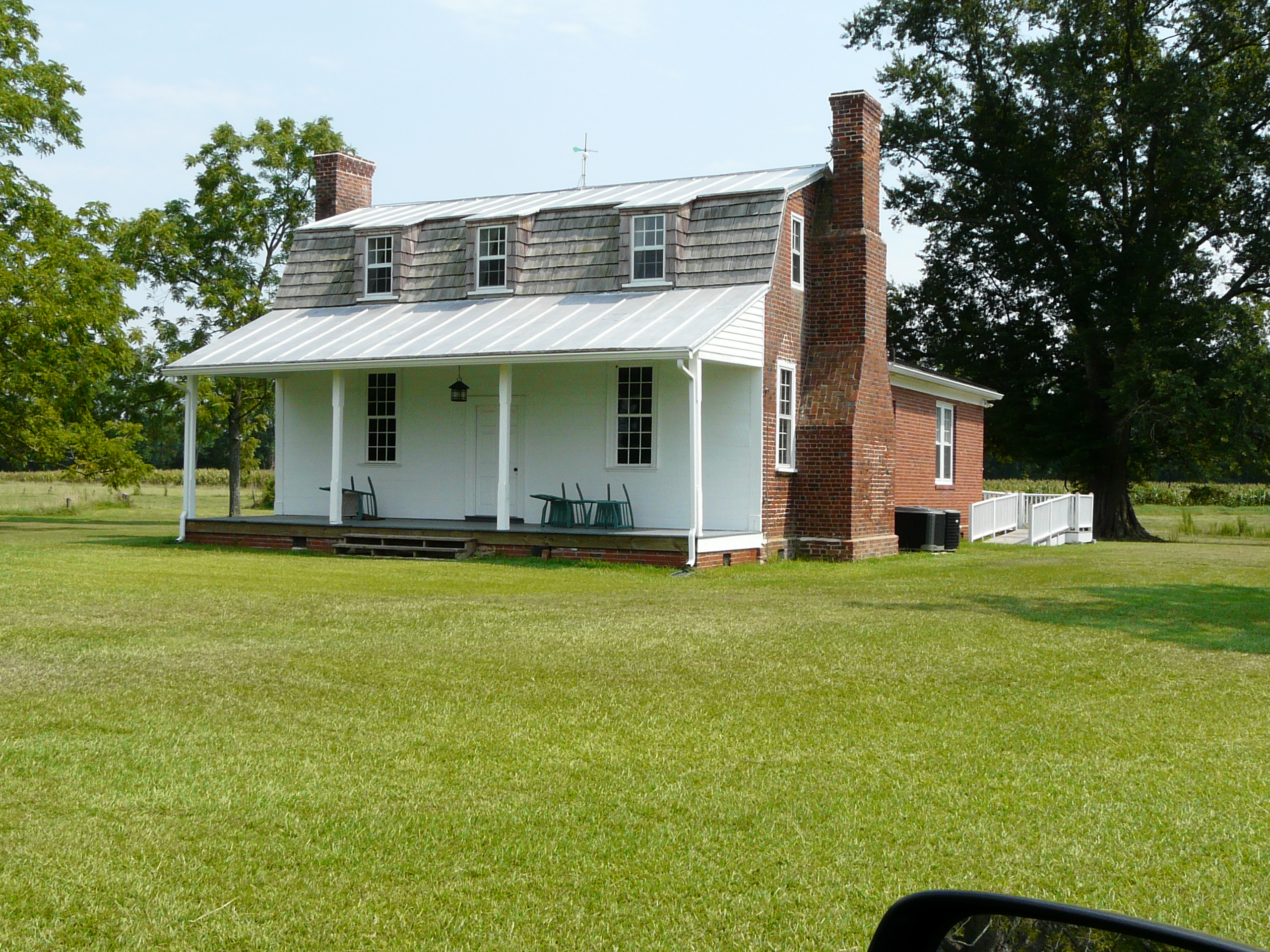
- Myers-White House

- Location within North Carolina Location within the United States
- Location: NE of Bethel on SR 1347, near Bethel, North Carolina
- Coordinates: 36°7′25″N 76°28′9″W
- Area: 2 acres (0.81 ha)
- Built: c. 1730
- Built by: Long, Thomas
- NRHP reference No.: 72000986
- Added to NRHP: January 20, 1972

The Myers-White House, also known as Sycamore Grove, is a private residence located near Hertford in the Bethel Township of Perquimans County, North Carolina. It is one of the oldest private homes in the state. The exact construction date is not known. It was likely constructed in the early 1700s. Thomas Long (~1730) is assumed to be the architect and builder. It is a 1 1/2-story frame dwelling with brick ends and a gambrel roof. It is one of the two known gambrel roof houses with brick ends in the state. It is a member of the small group of 18th century frame houses with brick ends in northeast North Carolina; the group includes the Sutton-Newby House and the Old Brick House.

It was added to the National Register of Historic Places in 1972.

== Gallery ==
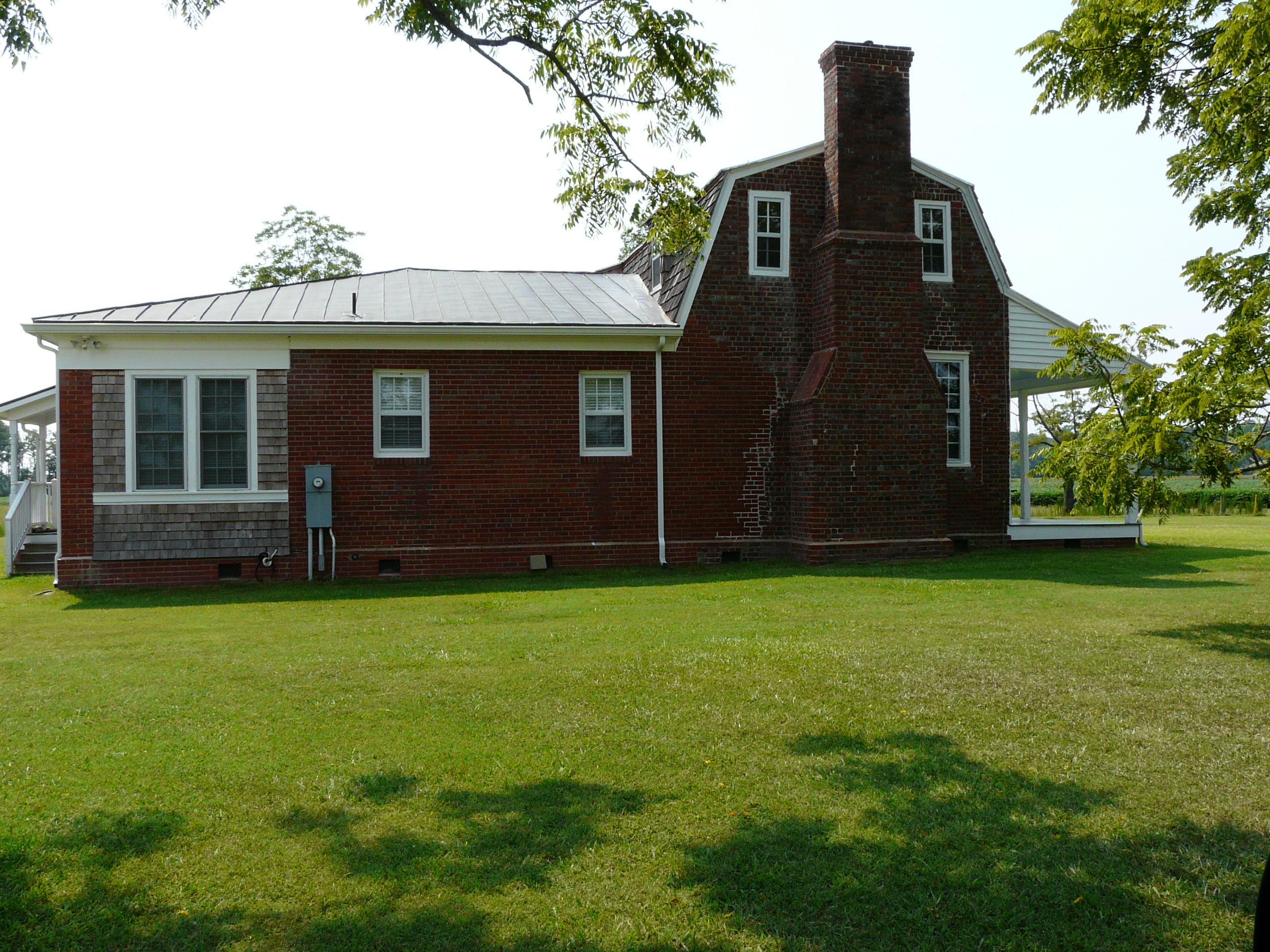
East Side View - Rear wing was added in the Early 1940s and rebuilt following Hurricane Isabell in 2008

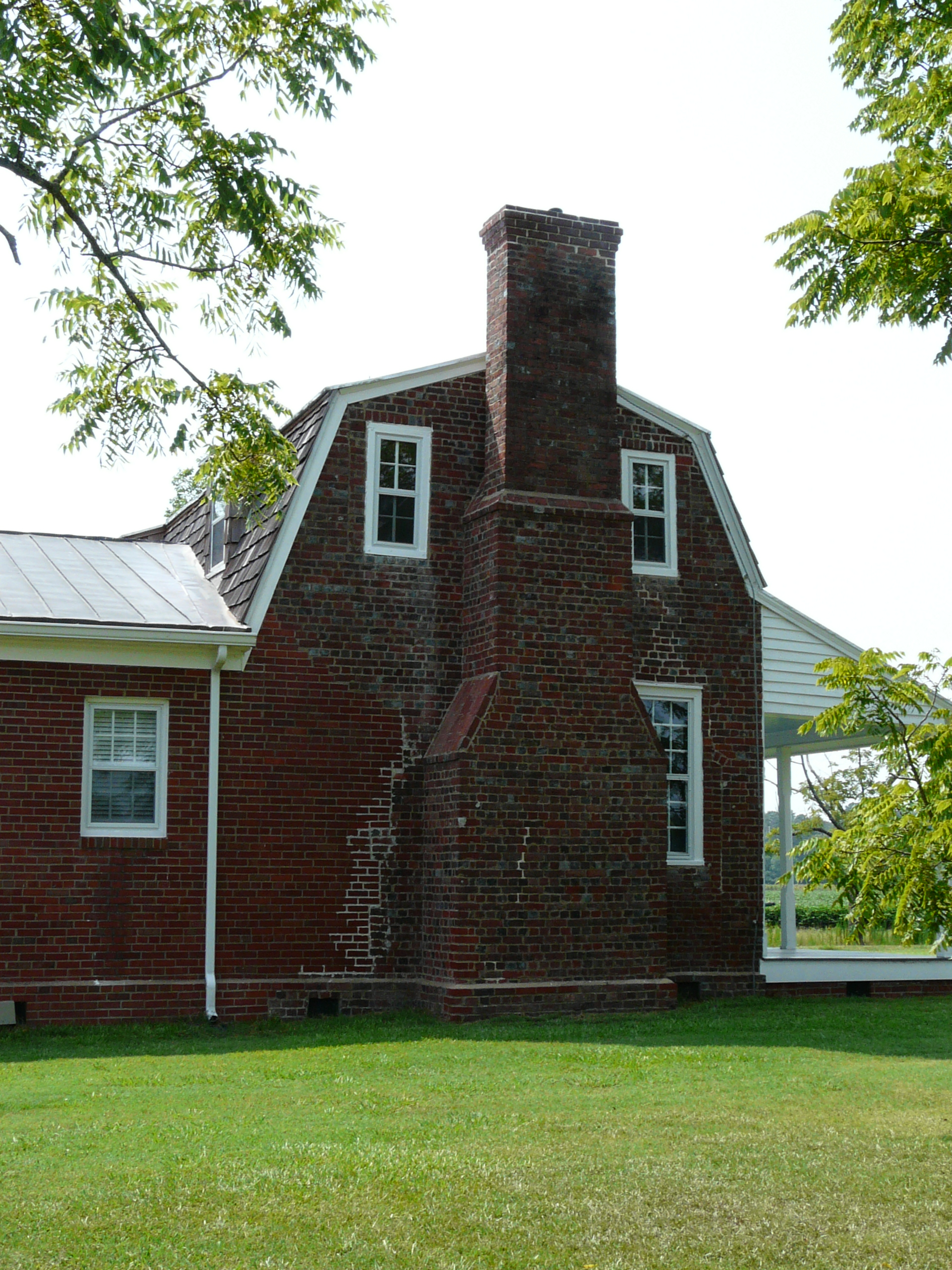
East Side Chimney

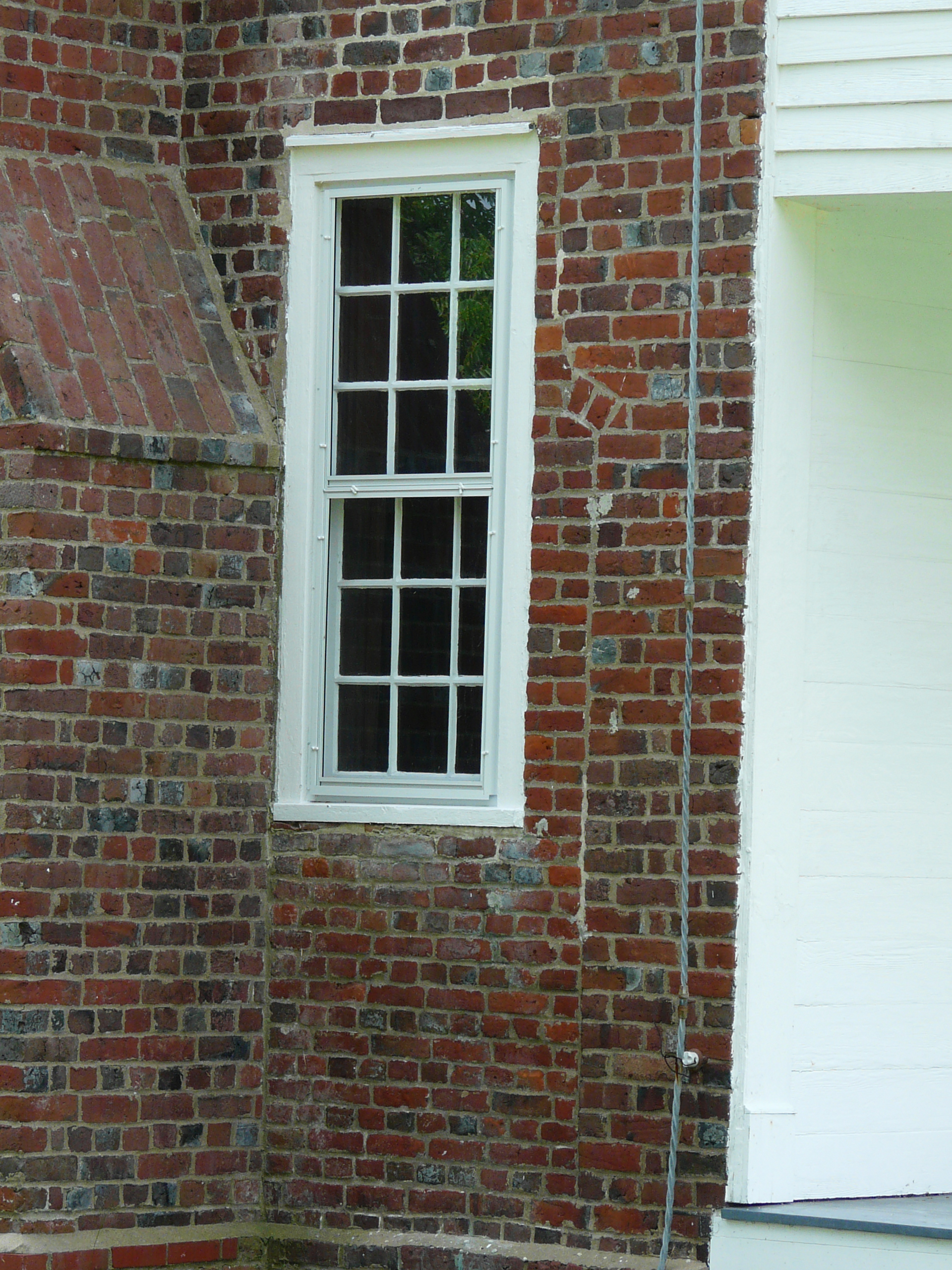
Front East Side Window - Shows remains of older door opening

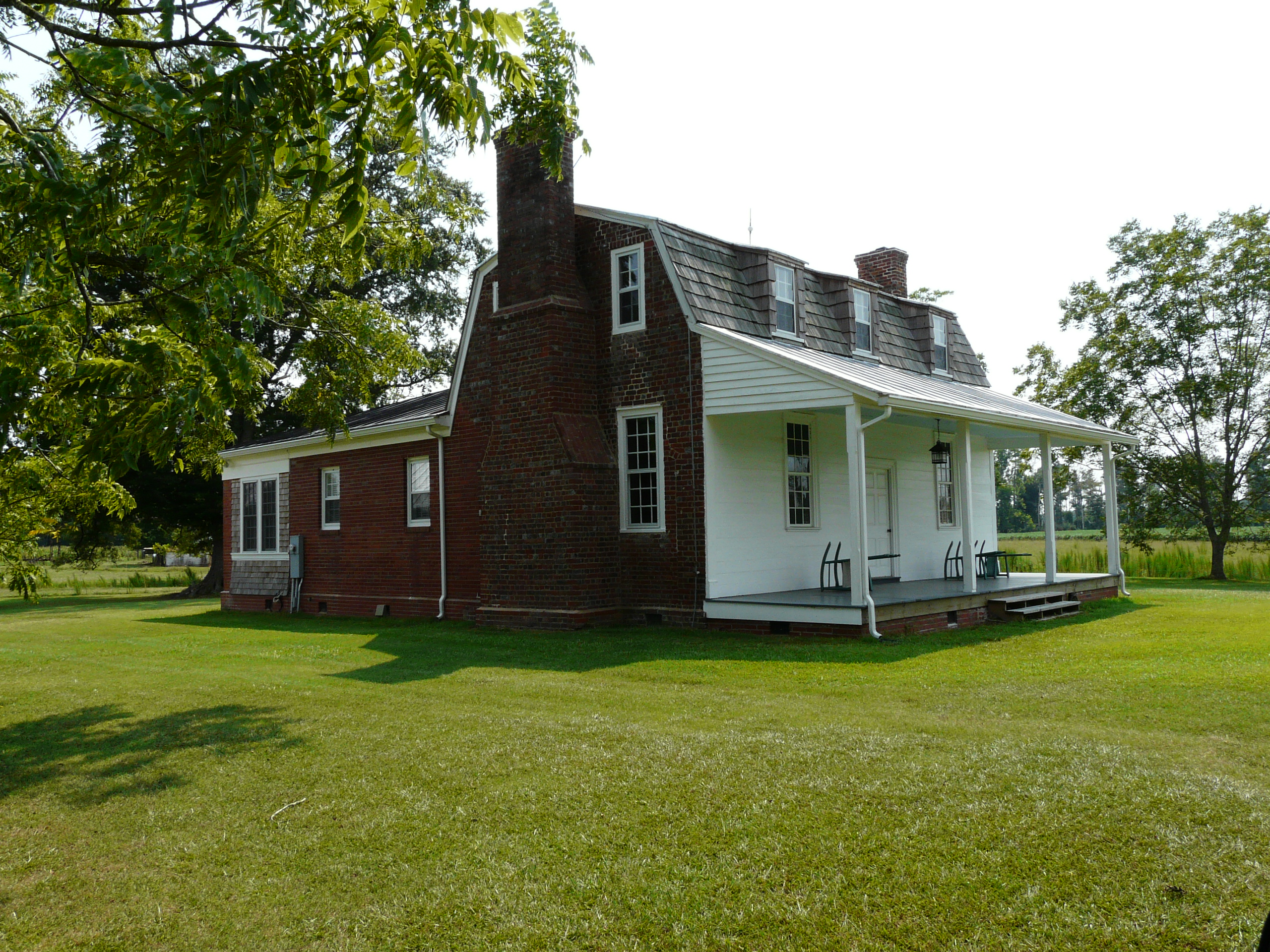
North East Corner View

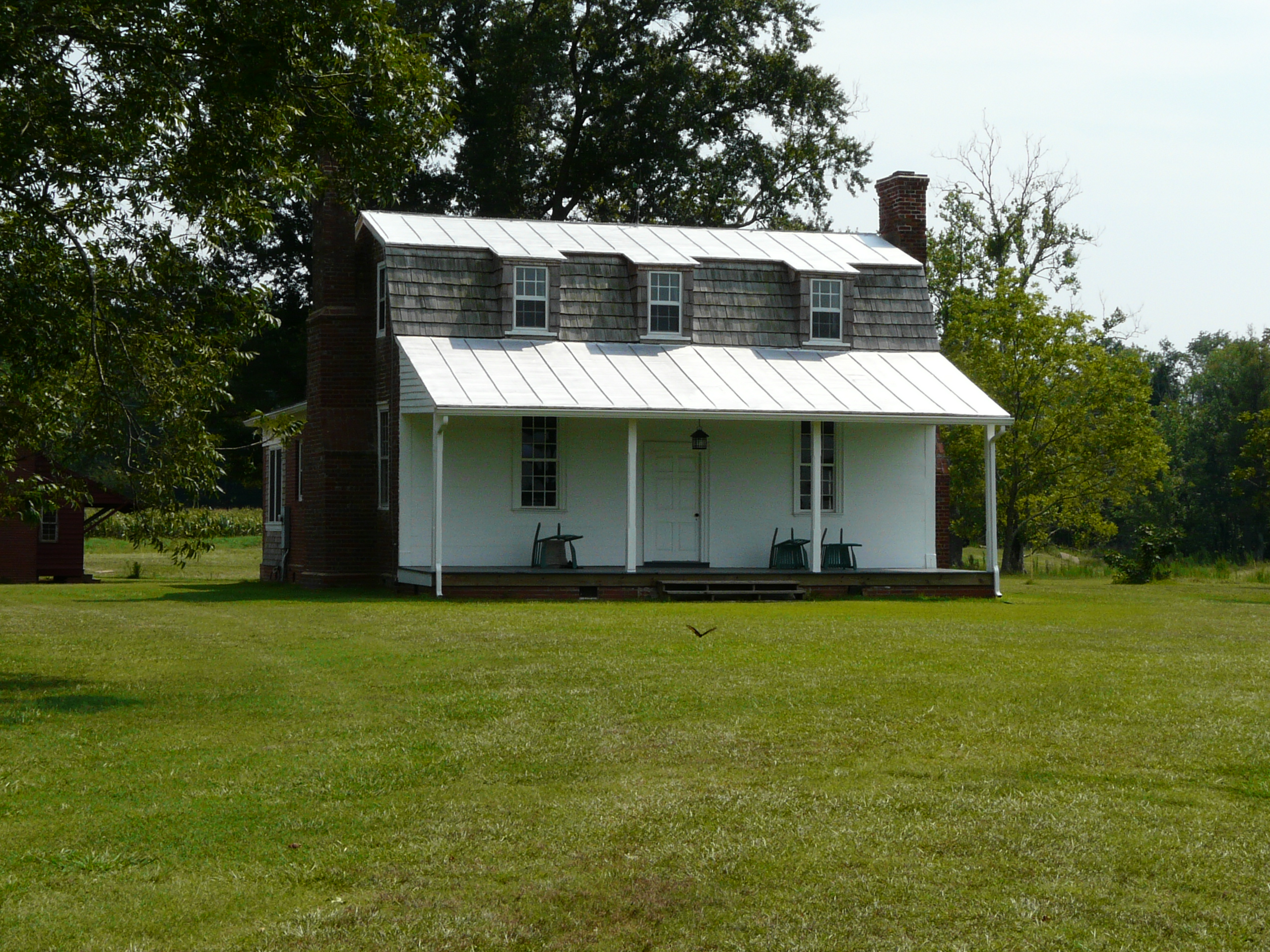
North (Front)Side View

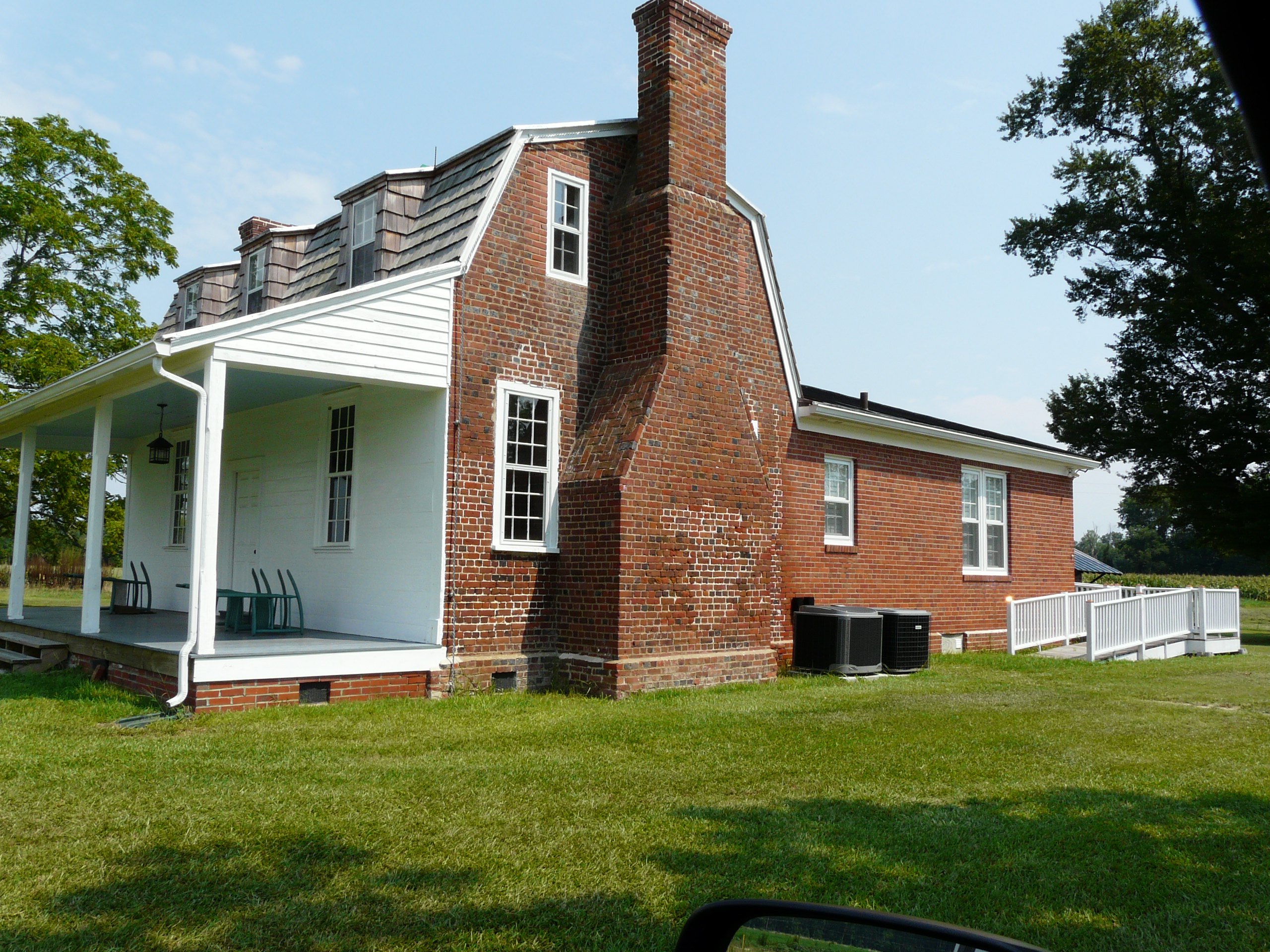
West Side View

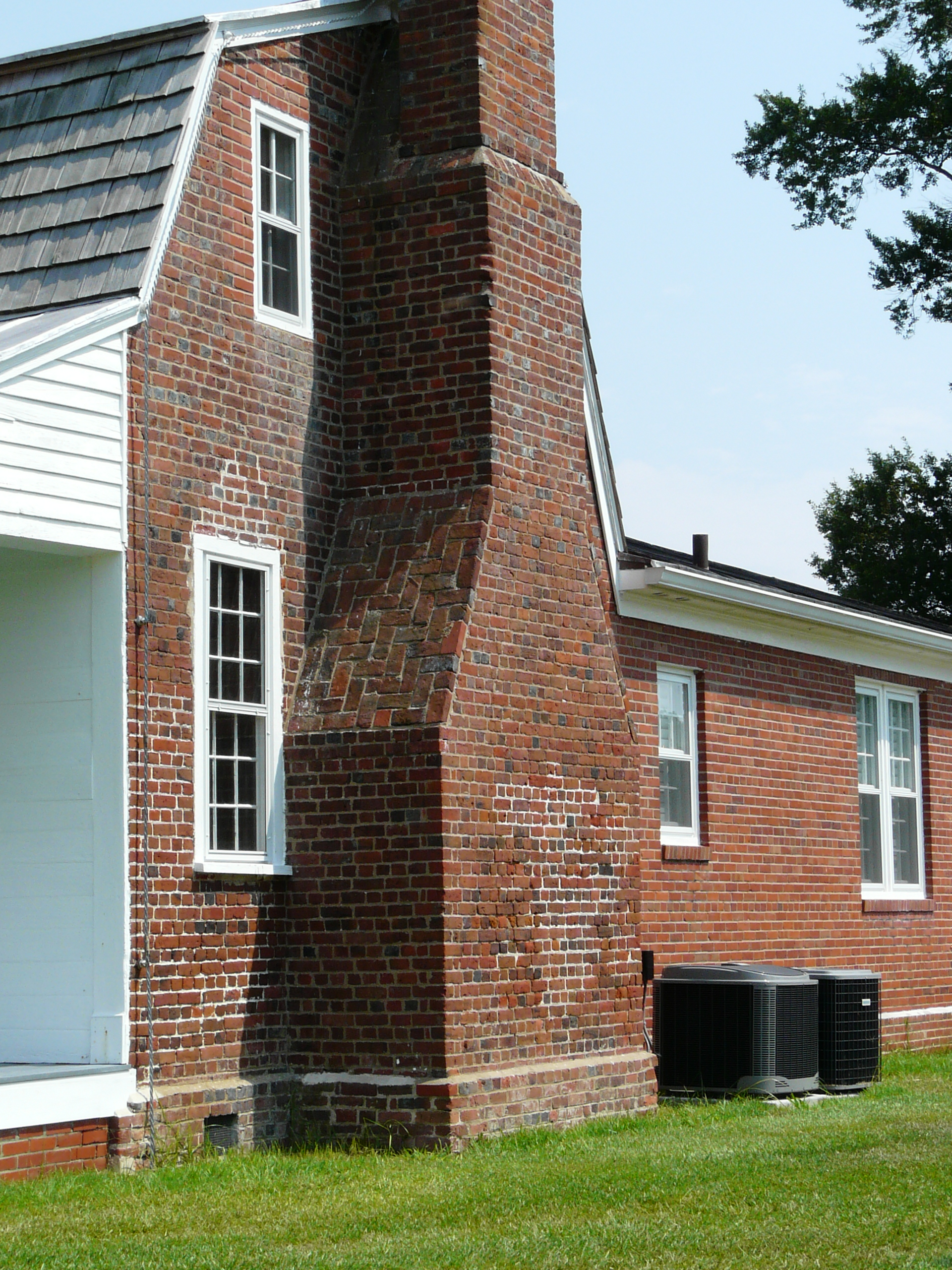
West Side Chimney

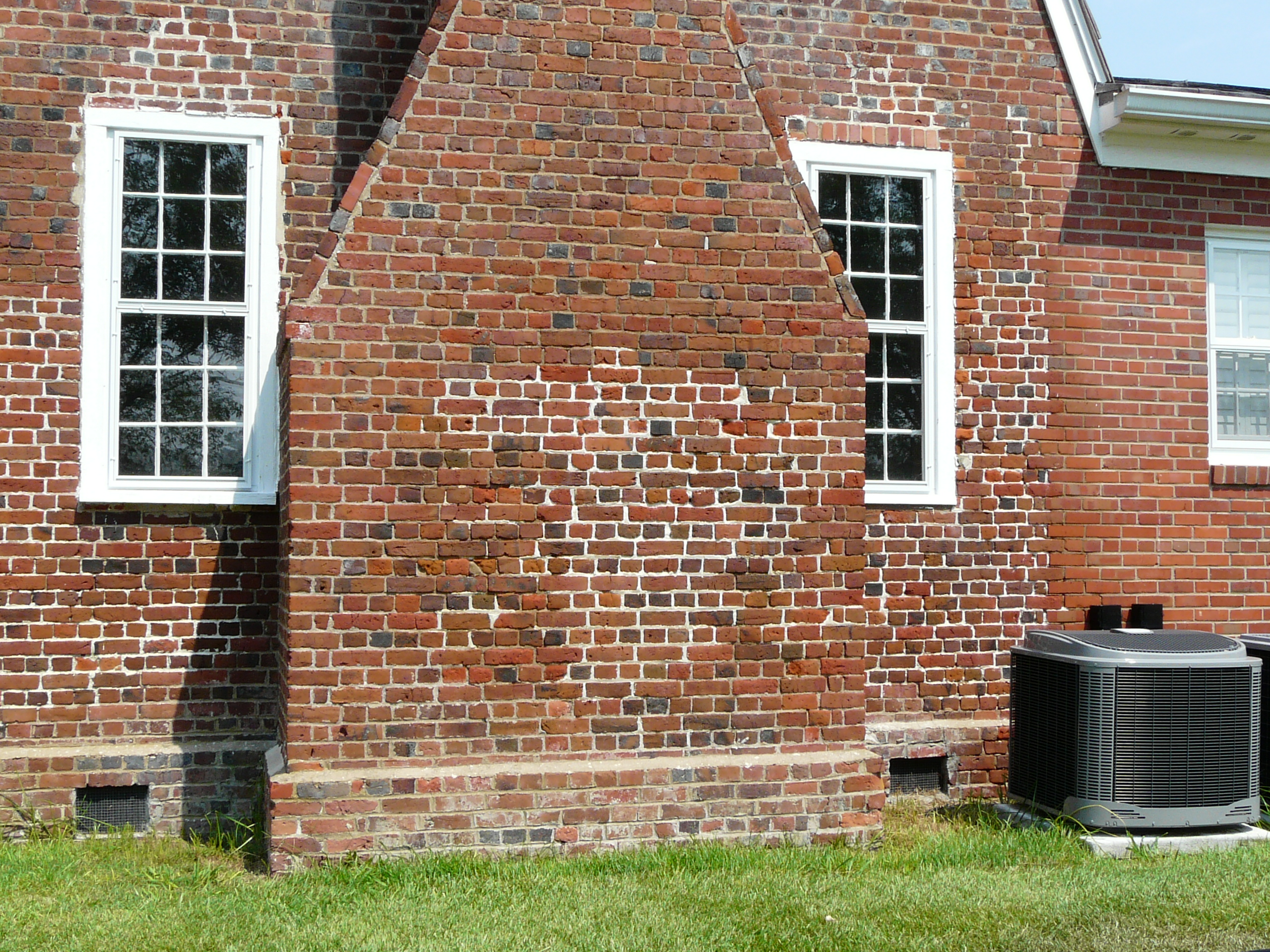
Close-up View of West Side Chimney

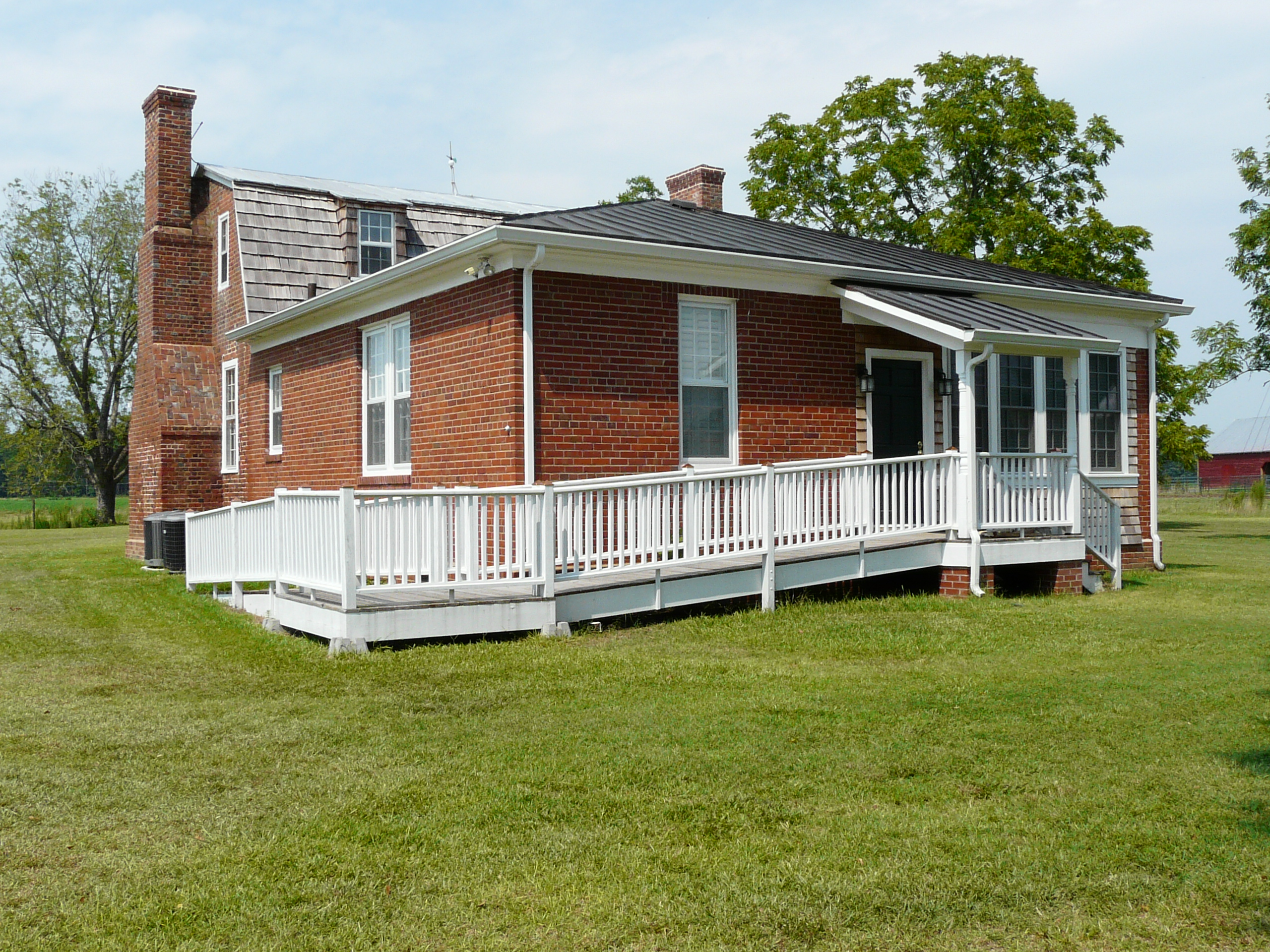
South West Corner View - Ramp added following Hurricane Isabell in 2008

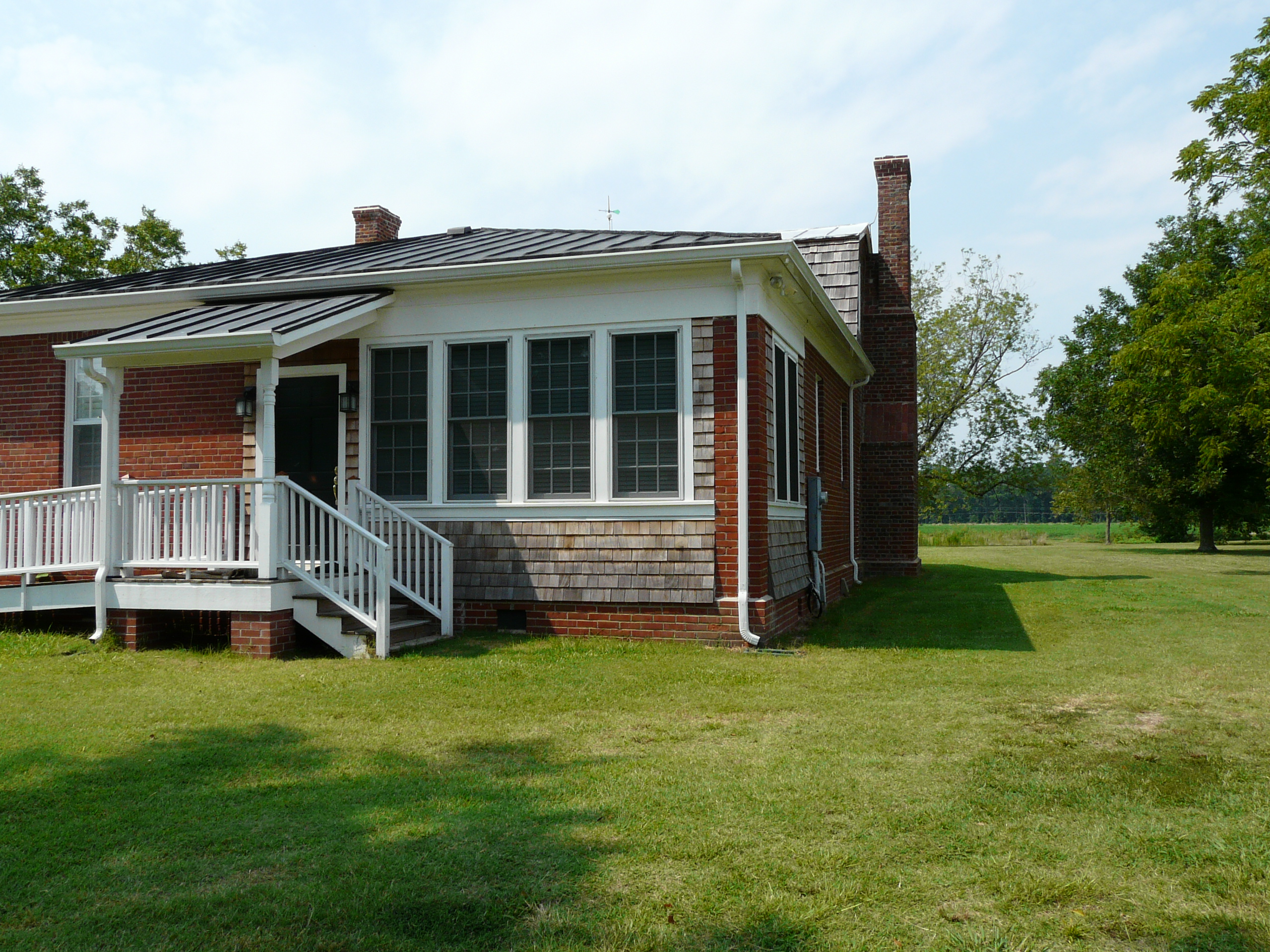
South (Rear) View - Rear Wing was added in the early 1940s
