= Nicanor, North Carolina =

Nicanor
- Unincorporated community
- Location within the state of North Carolina Nicanor (the United States)
- Coordinates: 36°19′58.56″N 76°28′42.80″W
- Country: United States
- State: North Carolina
- County: Perquimans
- Time zone: UTC-5 (Eastern (EST))
  - Summer (DST): UTC-4 (EDT)
- ZIP code: 27919
- Area code: 252
- GNIS feature ID: 1021647

Nicanor is an unincorporated community in Perquimans County, in the Albemarle Sound region of the northeastern part of the U.S. state of North Carolina. It is located north of the twin towns of Hertford and Winfall near the intersection of present-day Turnpike Road and the former Virginia & Carolina Coast Railroad. Nicanor is part of the Elizabeth City, North Carolina Micropolitan Statistical Area.

A post office was established at Nicanor on November 27, 1885 with Willis D. Riddick as postmaster. It ceased operations on March 15, 1911.

A two-teacher Rosenwald School was constructed at Nicanor in the 1927–28 budget year.
