= Cove Grove =

Historic house in North Carolina, United States

- U.S. National Register of Historic Places
- U.S. Historic district – Contributing property
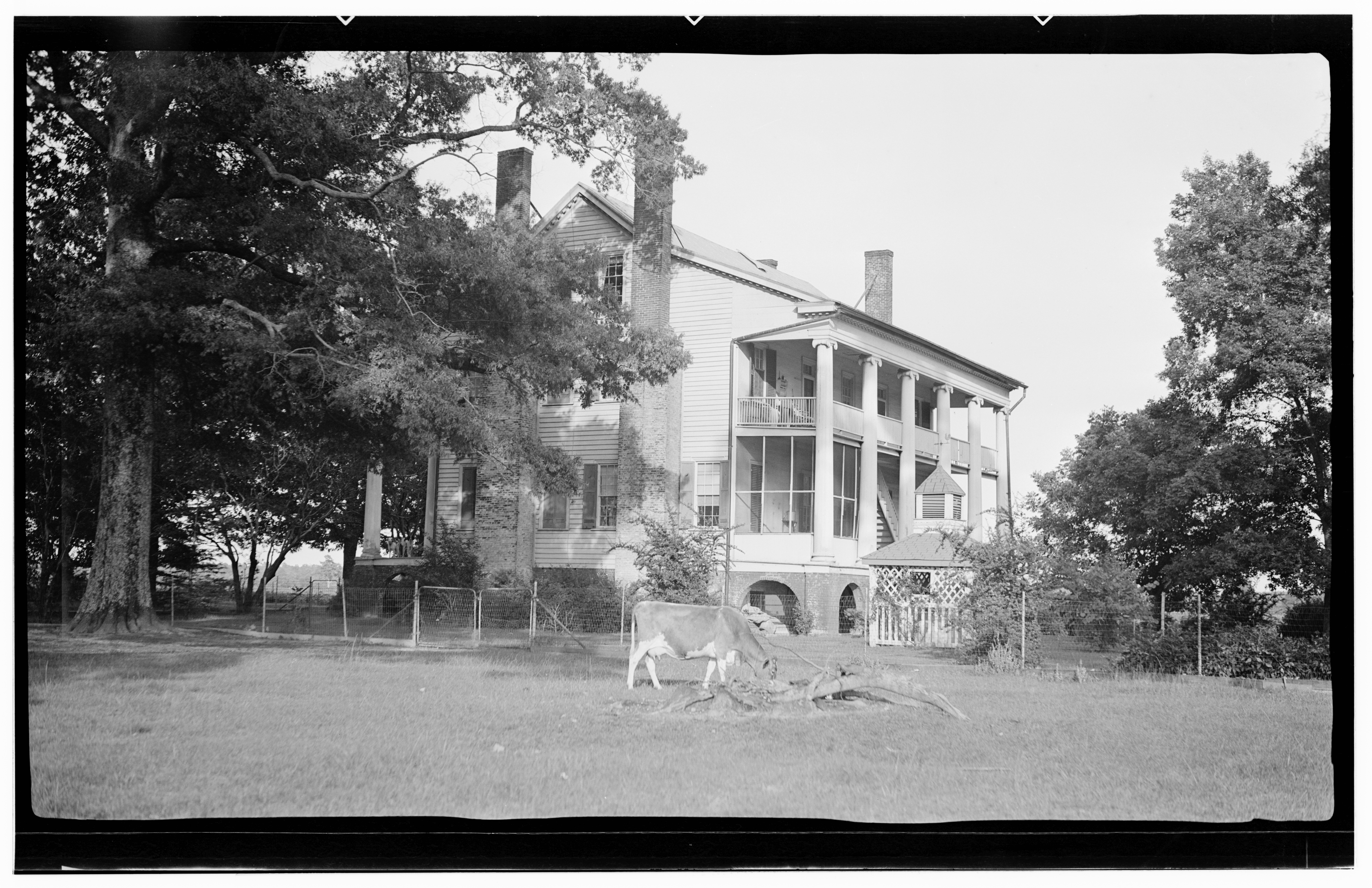
- Cove Grove, HABS photo, July 1940

- Location within North Carolina Location within the United States
- Location: E of Hertford near SR 1301 and 1302, near Hertford, North Carolina
- Coordinates: 36°11′02″N 76°25′02″W
- Area: 20 acres (8.1 ha)
- Built: c. 1830
- Built by: Benjamin Smith Skinner
- Architectural style: Greek Revival, Federal
- NRHP reference No.: 74001366
- Added to NRHP: August 7, 1974

Cove Grove is a historic plantation house located near Hertford, Perquimans County, North Carolina. It was built about 1830, and is a two-story, five-bay, transitional Federal / Greek Revival style frame dwelling. It has a gable roof and features front and rear full-height porticoes supported by Ionic order columns.

The house was added to the National Register of Historic Places in 1974. It is located in the Old Neck Historic District.
