= Old Neck Historic District =

Historic district in North Carolina, United States

- U.S. National Register of Historic Places
- U.S. Historic district
- Location within North Carolina Location within the United States
- Location: Roughly bounded by the Perquinmans R., NC 37, NC 1200, and NC 1213 surrounding Belvidere, near Hertford, North Carolina
- Coordinates: 36°11′33″N 76°25′07″W
- Area: 3,365 acres (1,362 ha)
- Built: 1813
- Architectural style: Federal, Greek Revival, Colonial Revival
- NRHP reference No.: 96000929
- Added to NRHP: September 6, 1996

Old Neck Historic District is a national historic district located at Belvidere, near Hertford, Perquimans County, North Carolina. The district encompasses 44 contributing buildings, 5 contributing sites, 12 contributing structures, and 1 contributing object in a rural agricultural area near Hertford. The district developed between about 1813 and 1946, and includes notable examples of Federal and Greek Revival, and Colonial Revival style architecture. Located in the district are the separately listed Fletcher-Skinner-Nixon Plantation and Cove Grove Plantation. Other notable buildings include the Francis Nixon Plantation, William Jones Plantation, Thomas Nixon Plantation, Winslow Farm, John Newbold Farm, and Matthew Towe Farm.

The house was added to the National Register of Historic Places in 1996.
