= Samuel Nixon House =

Historic house in North Carolina, United States

- U.S. National Register of Historic Places
- Location within North Carolina Location within the United States
- Location: NW of Hertford on SR 1121, near Hertford, North Carolina
- Coordinates: 36°13′3″N 76°29′45″W
- Area: 9 acres (3.6 ha)
- Built: c. 1790
- Built by: Nixon, Samuel
- NRHP reference No.: 73001366
- Added to NRHP: October 15, 1973

Samuel Nixon House is a historic plantation house located near Hertford, Perquimans County, North Carolina. It was built about 1790, and is a 1 1/2-story, frame dwelling with a gambrel roof and double-shouldered end chimney. It features a full-width front porch and one-story shed additions at the front and rear.

The house was added to the National Register of Historic Places in 1974.
