= Land's End (Hertford, North Carolina) =

Historic house in North Carolina, United States

- U.S. National Register of Historic Places
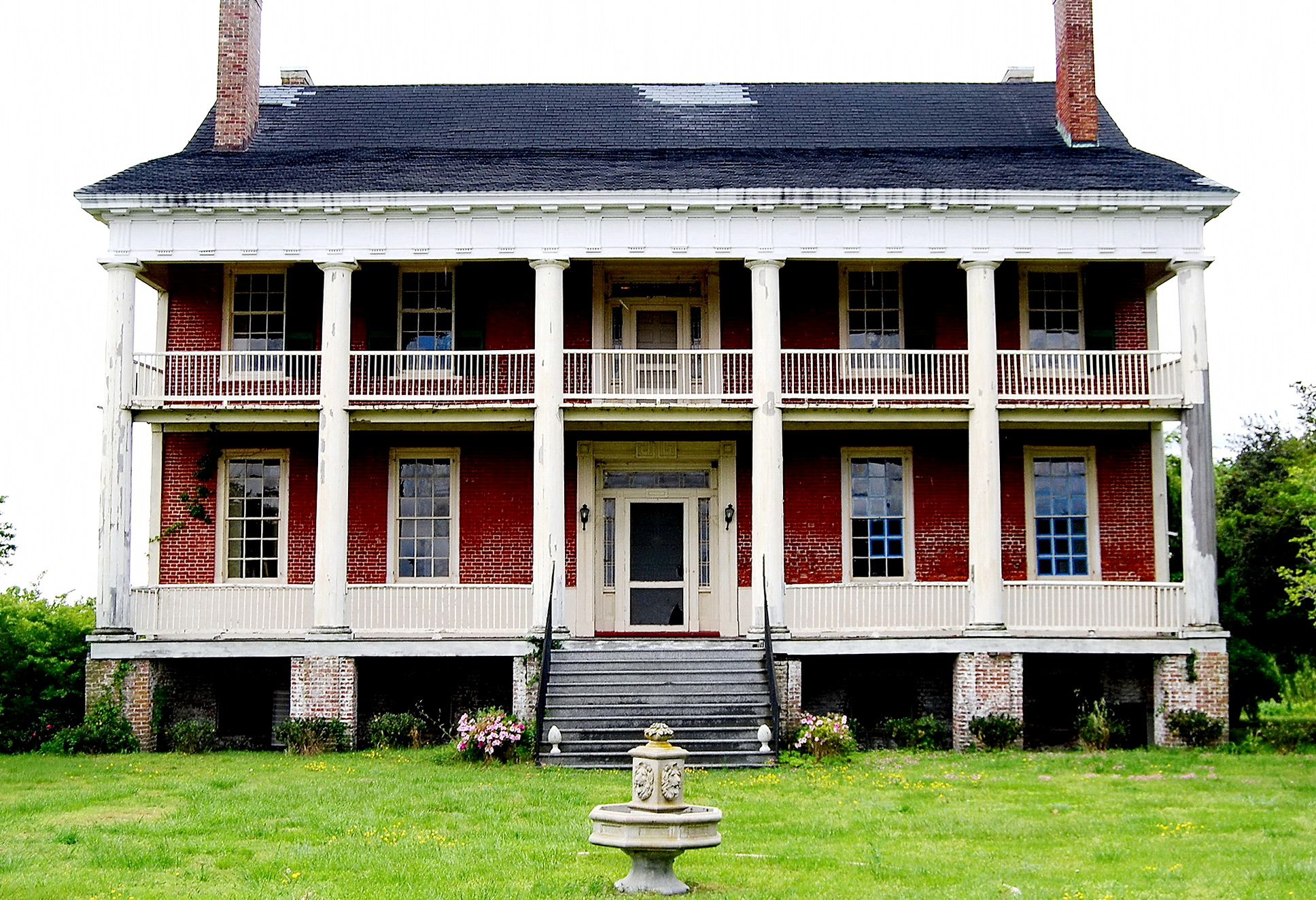
- Lands End, April 2012

- Location within North Carolina Location within the United States
- Location: SE of Hertford near jct. of SR 1300 and 1324, near Hertford, North Carolina
- Coordinates: 36°06′40″N 76°13′17″W
- Area: 40 acres (16 ha)
- Built: 1830
- Built by: James Leigh
- Architectural style: Greek Revival
- NRHP reference No.: 73001365
- Added to NRHP: September 20, 1973

Land's End, also known as Leigh House, is a historic plantation house located near Hertford, Perquimans County, North Carolina. It was built about 1830, and is a two-story, five bay by four bay, Greek Revival-style brick dwelling. Its brickwork is laid in Flemish bond. It has a gable roof and features front and rear full-height porticoes supported by unfluted Doric order columns.

The house was added to the National Register of Historic Places in 1974.

== Gallery ==
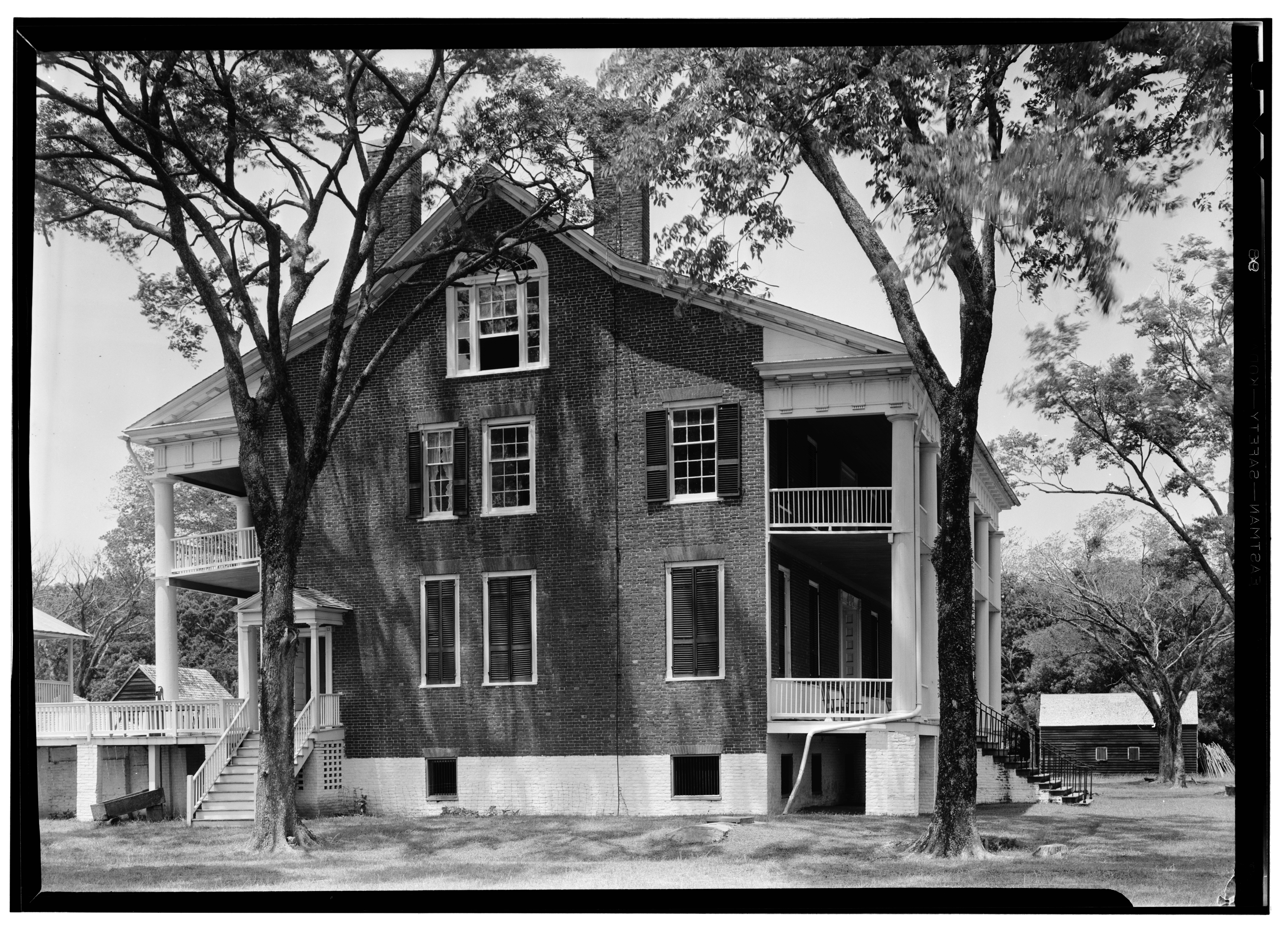
Leigh House, HABS Photo, July 1940
