= Fletcher-Skinner-Nixon House and Outbuildings =

Historic house in North Carolina, United States

- U.S. National Register of Historic Places
- U.S. Historic district – Contributing property
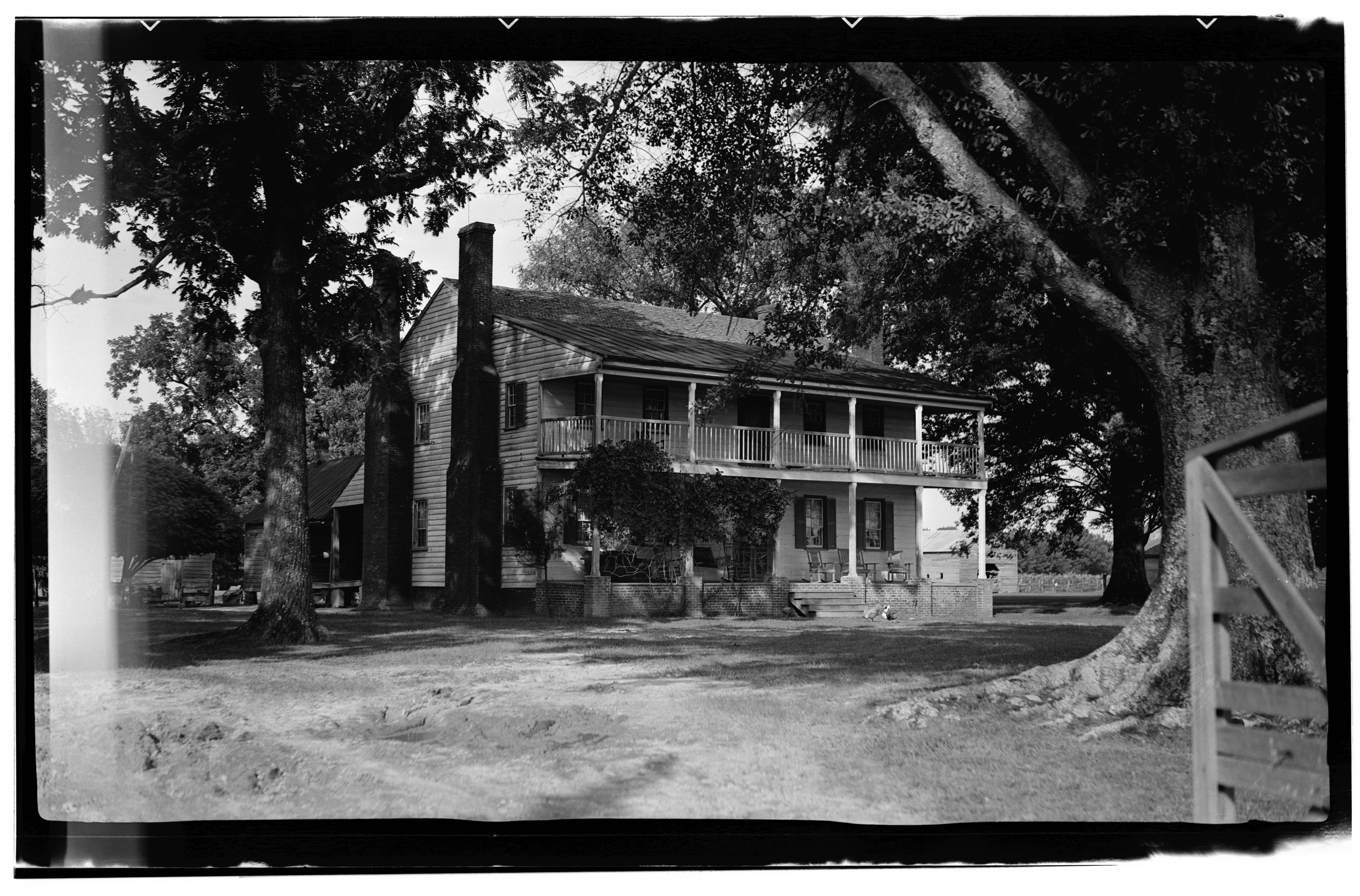
- 1940 HABS photo of the house

- Location within North Carolina Location within the United States
- Location: NC 1301 NE side, 0.45 miles SE of jct. with NC 1300, near Hertford, North Carolina
- Coordinates: 36°11′45″N 76°25′45″W
- Area: 5 acres (2.0 ha)
- Built: about 1820
- Architectural style: Federal
- NRHP reference No.: 93001541
- Added to NRHP: January 21, 1994

Fletcher-Skinner-Nixon House and Outbuildings, also known as Swampside, is a historic plantation complex located near Hertford, Perquimans County, North Carolina. The main house was built about 1820, and is a two-story, Federal style frame dwelling. It is sheathed in weatherboard, sits on a brick pier foundation, and features an engaged double-tier piazza. Also on the property are the contributing stuccoed brick dairy (c. 1820), smokehouse, well, and barn (c. 1860). In 1992, the Fletcher-Skinner-Nixon House was adapted for use as a bed and breakfast inn.

The house was added to the National Register of Historic Places in 1994. It is located in the Old Neck Historic District.
