= Isaac White House =

Historic house in North Carolina, United States

- U.S. National Register of Historic Places
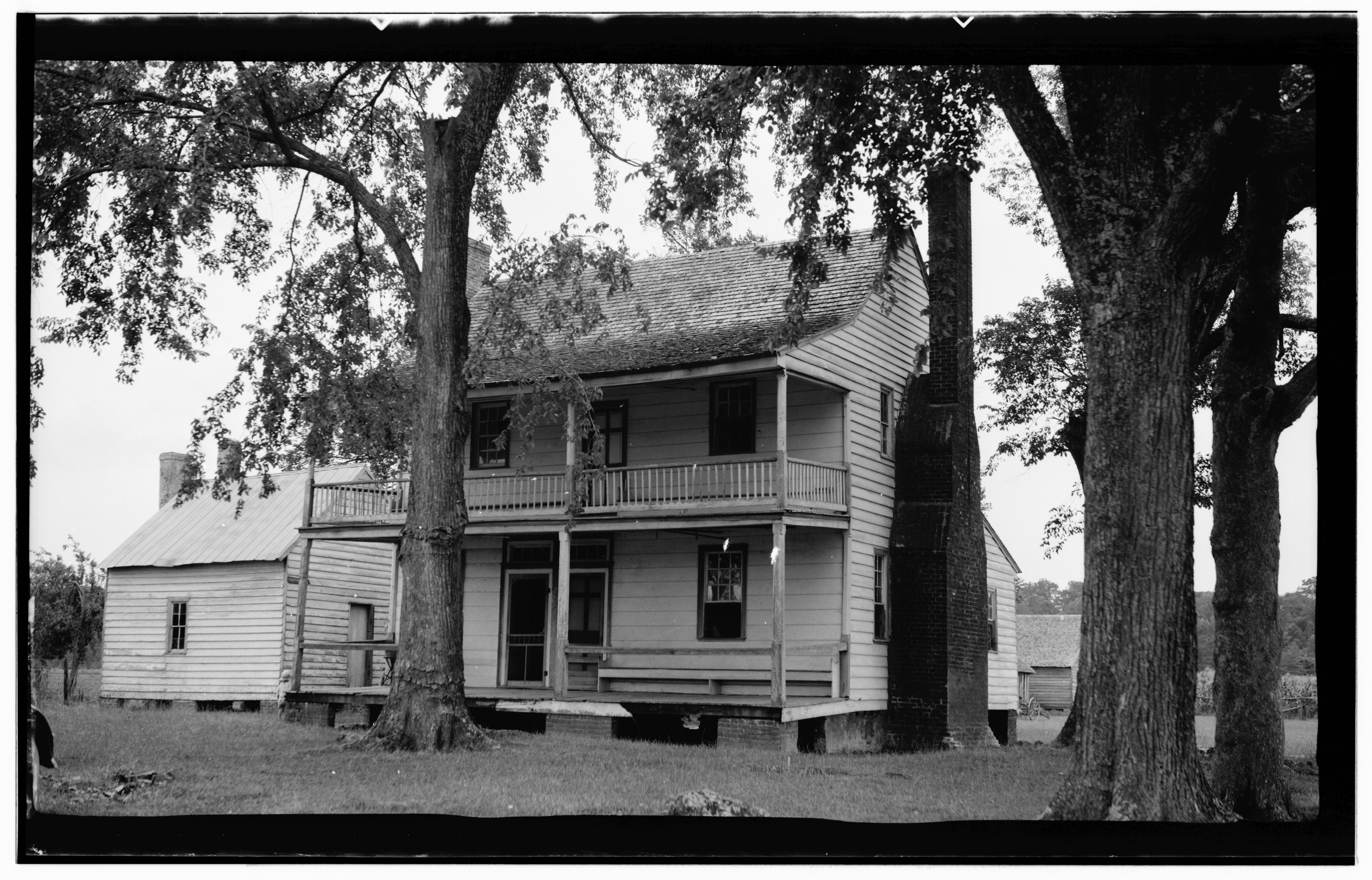
- Thomas White House, HABS Photo, July 1940

- Location within North Carolina Location within the United States
- Location: NE of Bethel on SR 1339, near Bethel, North Carolina
- Coordinates: 36°07′38″N 76°27′39″W
- Area: 45 acres (18 ha)
- Built: c. 1716
- Architectural style: 18th century vernacular
- NRHP reference No.: 79001742
- Added to NRHP: March 23, 1979

Isaac White House, also known as the Thomas White House, was a historic home located near Bethel, Perquimans County, North Carolina. It was built about 1716, and was a two-story, three-bay, hall-and-parlor plan frame house with semi-engaged, two-tier porch. It had a side gable roof, and featured flanking gable end brick chimneys with steep double shoulders. The house has been moved to 612 Holiday Island Road in Hertford NC, and is being restored by Down East Preservation and Old Town Wood Floors.

The house was added to the National Register of Historic Places in 1979.
