= Hertford Historic District =

Historic district in North Carolina, United States

- U.S. National Register of Historic Places
- U.S. Historic district
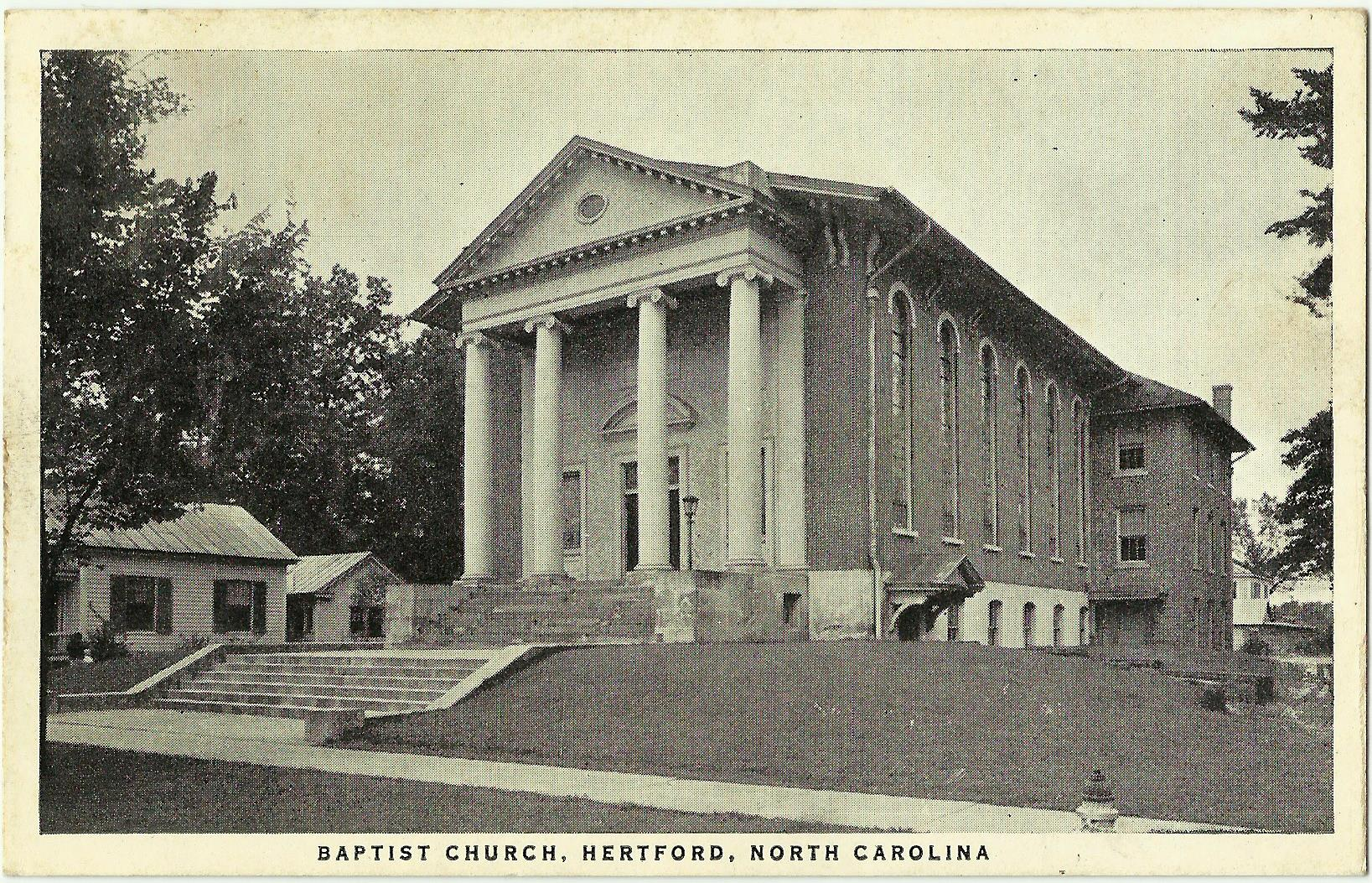
- Baptist church on Market Street

- Location within North Carolina Location within the United States
- Location: Roughly bounded by Perquimans R., W. Academy St., Hyde St., and Dobbs St., Hertford, North Carolina
- Coordinates: 36°11′23″N 76°28′04″W
- Area: 115 acres (47 ha)
- Built: 1825
- Architectural style: Federal, Greek Revival, Gothic Revival
- NRHP reference No.: 98001264
- Added to NRHP: October 22, 1998

Hertford Historic District is a national historic district located at Hertford, Perquimans County, North Carolina. The district encompasses 219 contributing buildings, 2 contributing sites, 1 contributing structure, and 1 contributing object in the central business district and surrounding residential sections of Hertford. The district developed between about 1759 and 1948, and includes notable examples of Federal, Greek Revival, and Gothic Revival style architecture. Located in the district are the separately listed Perquimans County Courthouse and Church of the Holy Trinity. Other notable buildings include the Creecy-Skinner-Whedbee House (c. 1779), Edward Wood House (c. 1818), Matthews-Jacocks House (c. 1824), Temperance Hall (1851), Matthew H. White House (c. 1893), Dr. Thomas S. McMullan House (1905), Thomas Nixon House (c. 1917), William M. Divers House (1924), W.R. Shannonhouse Building (1895), Darden Department Store (c. 1909), Farmers National Bank of Hertford (1916), State Theatre (1937), Old Hertford Post Office (1915), Hertford Baptist Church (1854), and Hertford United Methodist Church (1901).

The house was added to the National Register of Historic Places in 1998.
