= Church of the Holy Trinity (Hertford, North Carolina) =

Historic church in North Carolina, United States

- U.S. National Register of Historic Places
- U.S. Historic district – Contributing property
- Location within North Carolina Location within the United States
- Location: 207 S. Church St., Hertford, North Carolina
- Coordinates: 36°11′14″N 76°28′0″W
- Area: 1.9 acres (0.77 ha)
- Built: 1850
- Architect: Watson, T.W.
- Architectural style: Gothic Revival
- NRHP reference No.: 98000688
- Added to NRHP: June 11, 1998

Church of the Holy Trinity is a historic Episcopal church located at 207 S. Church Street in Hertford, Perquimans County, North Carolina. It is a parish of the Episcopal Diocese of East Carolina. The church reported 151 members in 2015 and 75 members in 2023; no membership statistics were reported in 2024 parochial reports. Plate and pledge income reported for the congregation in 2024 was $130,303. Average Sunday attendance (ASA) in 2024 was 45 persons.

The church was built between 1848 and 1851, and is a small, frame Gothic Revival style church. It has a deeply pitched gable roof, pointed arch door and window openings, and is sheathed in plain weatherboard. The front porch and corner bell tower were added in 1894. Also on the property is a contributing church cemetery. It was listed on the National Register of Historic Places in 1998. It is located in the Hertford Historic District.
