= Jonathan Hill Jacocks House =

Historic house in North Carolina, United States

- U.S. National Register of Historic Places
- Location within North Carolina Location within the United States
- Location: Jct. of New Hope Rd. and Jacocks Ln., New Hope Township, North Carolina
- Coordinates: 36°8′47″N 76°15′59″W
- Area: 1.8 acres (0.73 ha)
- Built: c. 1815, c. 1838, c. 1847-1848
- Built by: James Leigh
- Architectural style: Greek Revival, Federal
- NRHP reference No.: 98000276
- Added to NRHP: April 1, 1998

Jonathan Hill Jacocks House is a historic plantation house located in New Hope Township, Perquimans County, North Carolina. It is a large, two-story, frame dwelling consisting of two houses joined in an L-plan configuration. The older section is a two-story, three-bay, single pile Federal style frame structure. About 1838, it was enlarged to a central hall plan with six bays, and with a two-story rear ell. It was also renovated in the Greek Revival style. A full width portico with Doric order columns was added about 1847–1848.

The house was added to the National Register of Historic Places in 1998.
