= Old Brick House =

Historic home from 1750 in Elizabeth City, Pasquotank County, North Carolina

- U.S. National Register of Historic Places
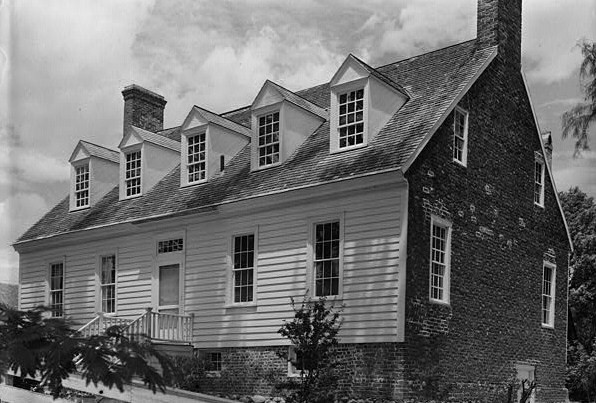
- Brick House, HABS Photo, July 1940

- Location within North Carolina Location within the United States
- Location: 182 Brick House Lane, Elizabeth City, North Carolina
- Coordinates: 36°20′0″N 76°13′16″W
- Area: 1.5 acres (0.61 ha)
- Built: c. 1750
- Built by: Murden, Robert
- NRHP reference No.: 72000983
- Added to NRHP: March 16, 1972

Old Brick House is a historic home located at Elizabeth City, Pasquotank County, North Carolina. It was built about 1750, and is a 1 1/2-story frame dwelling with brick gable ends. It sits on a raised brick basement, has a gable roof with dormers, and two interior end chimneys with molded caps. The interior features a richly carved mantel with an elaborate broken ogee pediment. It is one of the few brick-end buildings in the state. The brickwork is laid in Flemish bond with glazed headers. It is a member of the small group of 18th century frame houses with brick ends in northeast North Carolina; the group includes the Sutton-Newby House and the Myers-White House.

Local legend held that the house was built and first occupied by the pirate Blackbeard, though in reality he had been dead since 1718.

It was listed on the National Register of Historic Places in 1972.
