= Sutton-Newby House =

Historic house in North Carolina, United States

- U.S. National Register of Historic Places
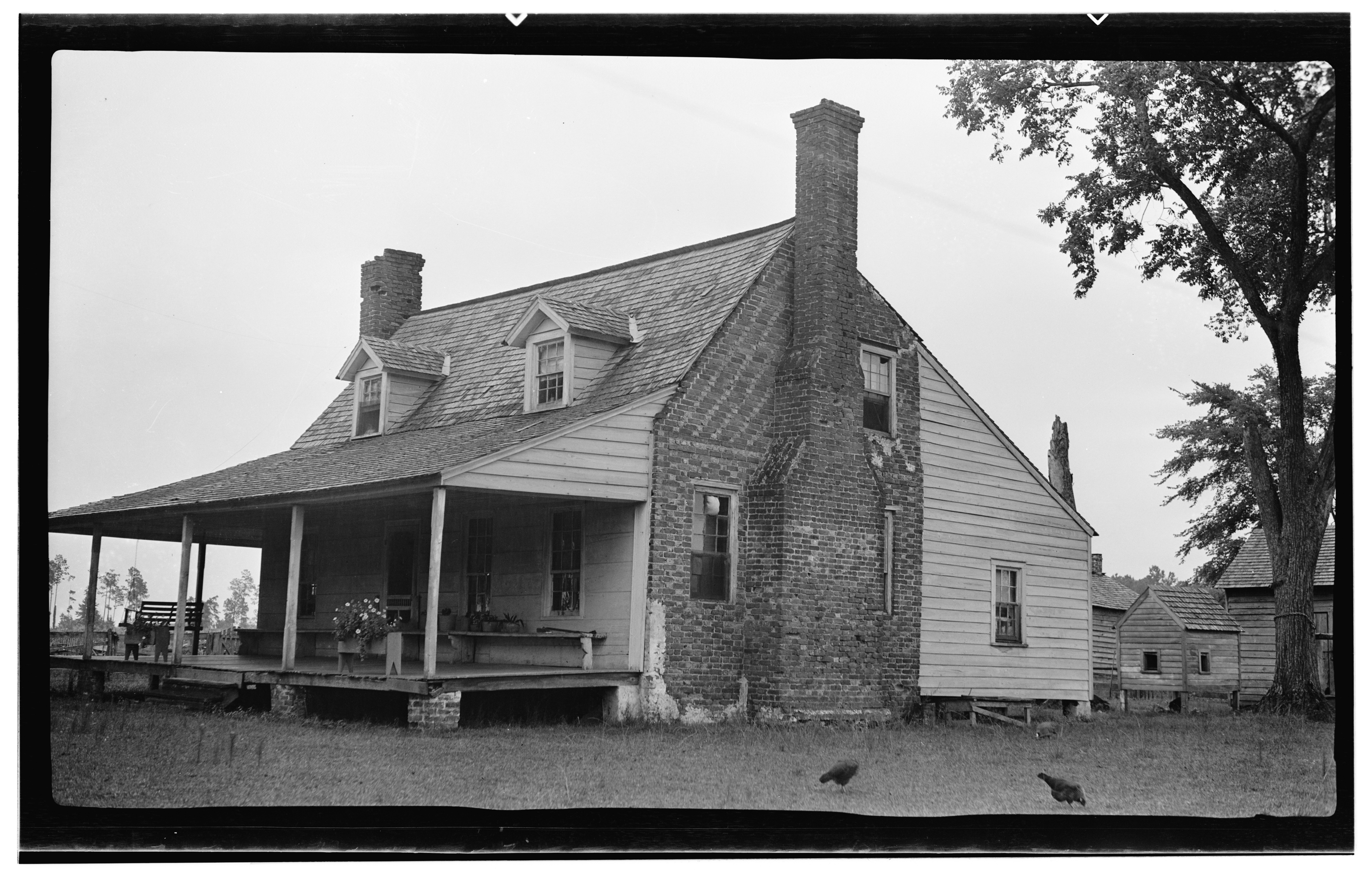
- Davis House, HABS photo, July 1940

- Location within North Carolina Location within the United States
- Location: E of Hertford, near Hertford, North Carolina
- Coordinates: 36°11′16″N 76°22′56″W
- Area: 9 acres (3.6 ha)
- Built: c. 1745
- NRHP reference No.: 74001367
- Added to NRHP: September 10, 1974

Sutton-Newby House is a historic plantation house located near Hertford, Perquimans County, North Carolina. It was built about 1745, and is a 1 1/2-story, four-bay, frame dwelling with a brick end and gable roof. It originally had both ends in brick. It features a full-width, shed roofed front porch and massive double-shouldered chimney. It is a member of the small group of 18th century frame houses with brick ends in northeast North Carolina; the group includes the Myers-White House and the Old Brick House. The Sutton–Newby House's brickwork is laid in Flemish bond.

The house was added to the National Register of Historic Places in 1974.
