= Perquimans River =

River in the United States of America

Coordinates: 36.0968268°N 76.2846566°W

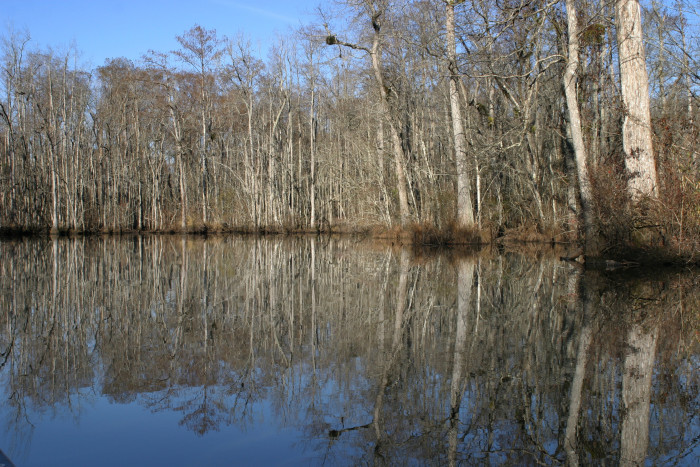
The Perquimans River in Belvidere

The Perquimans River is a coastal waterway in Northeastern North Carolina in the United States. Located entirely within Perquimans County, the river drains directly to the Albemarle Sound between Durant's Neck on the north and Harvey Neck on the south. It is a tidal estuary to just north of the towns of Hertford and Winfall. Because of the extremely flat topography of the region, the Perquimans flows quite slowly and has cypress swamps on either bank for much of its upper length. It has its headwaters in the swampy region of northern Perquimans and southern Gates counties. It flows past the communities of Nicanor, Whiteston, Belvidere, and the towns of Hertford and Winfall.
