= Nicanor of Epirus =

Nicanor (/naɪˈkeɪnər/; Greek: Nικάνωρ Nīkā́nōr) of Epirus was a son of Myrton of Epirus, and lived in the 3rd to 2nd centuries BCE. Along with his father, he supported the oppressive and rapacious proceedings of Charops of Epirus in the government of their native country.
