= Perquimans County Courthouse =

Historic courthouse in North Carolina, US

- U.S. National Register of Historic Places
- U.S. Historic district – Contributing property
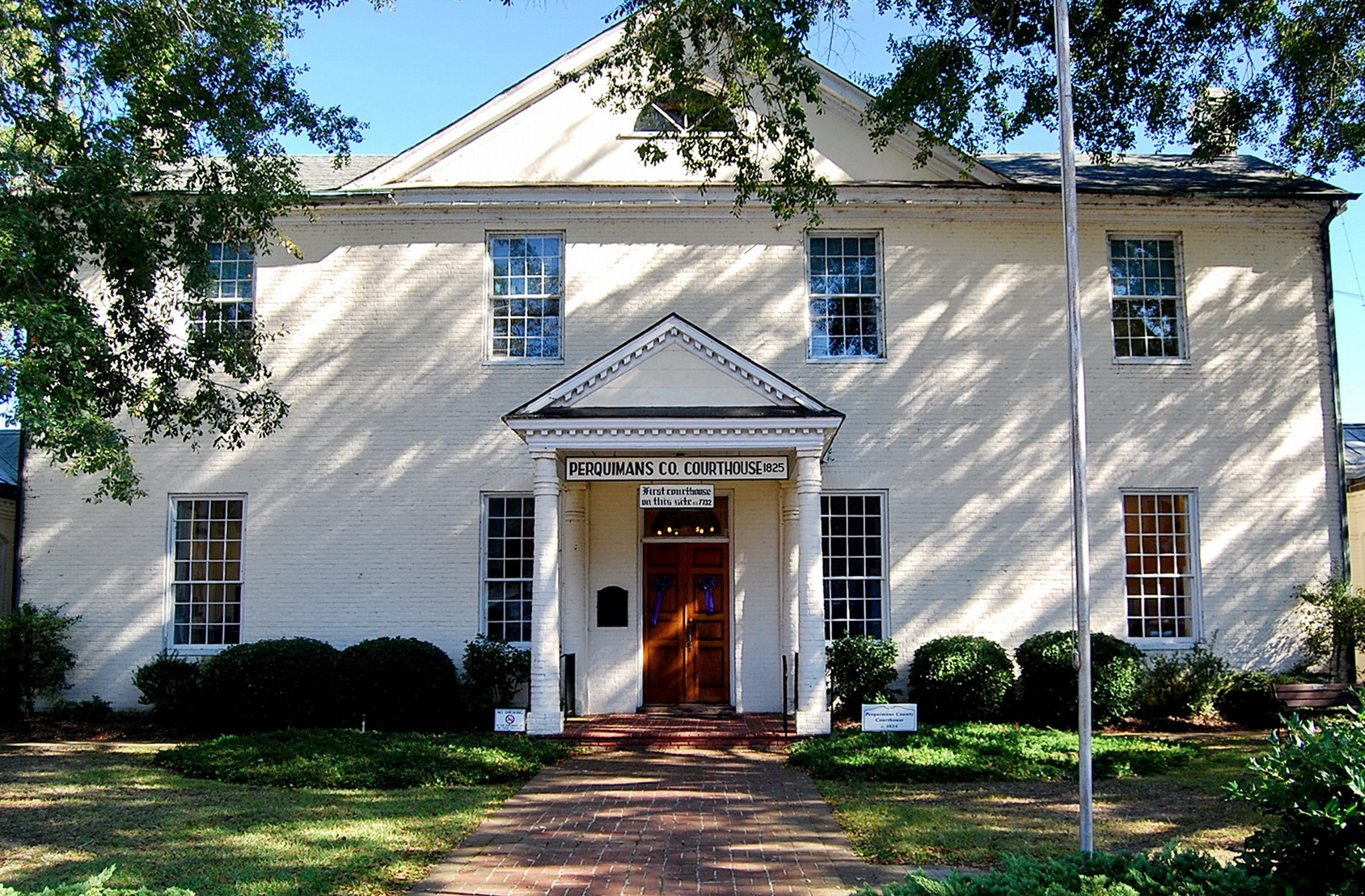
- Perquimans County Courthouse, October 2012

- Location within North Carolina Location within the United States
- Location: Market St., Hertford, North Carolina
- Coordinates: 36°11′21″N 76°27′55″W
- Area: less than one acre
- Built: 1819-1825
- Built by: Gatling, John
- Architectural style: Georgian
- MPS: North Carolina County Courthouses TR
- NRHP reference No.: 79001743
- Added to NRHP: May 10, 1979

Perquimans County Courthouse is a historic courthouse building located at Hertford, Perquimans County, North Carolina. It was built between 1819 and 1825, and is a 2 1/2-story, four-bay, Georgian-style brick building. It has a T-shaped plan, with late 19th- and 20th-century rear additions. The front facade features a one-story, one-bay pedimented portico with molded brick columns.

It was added to the National Register of Historic Places in 1979. It is located in the Hertford Historic District.
