= Winfall, North Carolina =

- Town
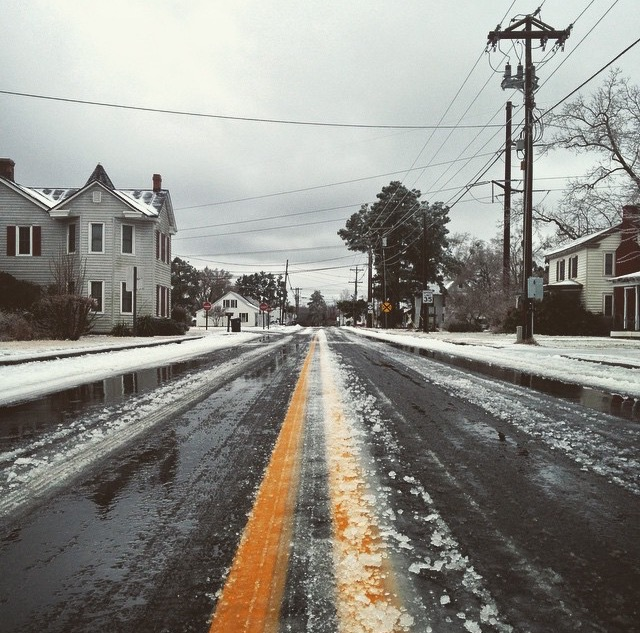
- Main Street in Winfall after the 2015 Valentine's Day blizzard
- Motto: "Forward With Integrity"
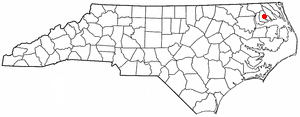
- Location of Winfall, North Carolina
- Coordinates: 36°12′38″N 76°27′18″W
- Country: United States
- State: North Carolina
- County: Perquimans
- Incorporated: 1887

Government
  - Mayor: Preston White

Area
  - Total: 2.32 sq mi (6.01 km^{2})
  - Land: 2.31 sq mi (5.98 km^{2})
  - Water: 0.012 sq mi (0.03 km^{2})
- Elevation: 13 ft (4.0 m)

Population (2020)
  - Total: 555
  - Density: 240.5/sq mi (92.86/km^{2})
- Time zone: UTC-5 (Eastern (EST))
  - Summer (DST): UTC-4 (EDT)
- ZIP code: 27985
- Area code: 252
- FIPS code: 37-74720
- GNIS feature ID: 2406900
- Website: townofwinfall.org

Winfall is a town in Perquimans County, North Carolina, United States. The population was 554 at the 2020 census. It is part of the Elizabeth City, North Carolina Micropolitan Statistical Area.

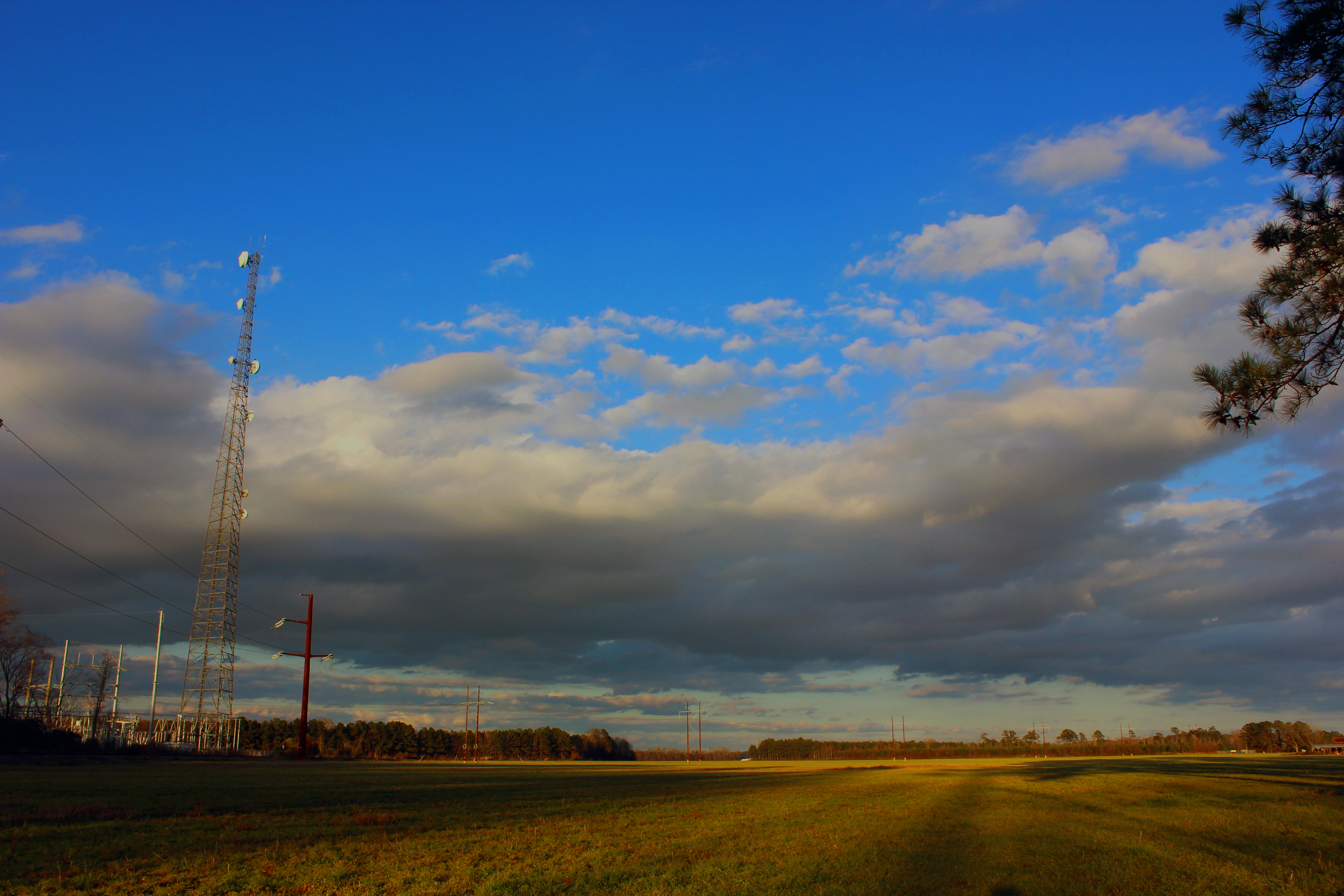
An unused soybean field in Winfall

== History ==
The Winfall Historic District was listed on the National Register of Historic Places in 2003.

== Geography ==
Winfall (along with Hertford) is considered to be on the southwesternmost fringe of the Hampton Roads Metropolitan Area, and many local residents commute frequently to and from the Seven Cities region for work, shopping, and leisure.

According to the United States Census Bureau, the town has a total area of 2.2 square miles (5.7 km^{2}), of which 2.1 square miles (5.4 km^{2}) is land and 0.47% is water. It is located strategically upon the Perquimans River.

== Demographics ==
Historical population
Census	Pop.	Note	%±
1900	222		—
1910	289		30.2%
1920	288		−0.3%
1930	426		47.9%
1940	160		−62.4%
1950	421		163.1%
1960	269		−36.1%
1970	581		116.0%
1980	634		9.1%
1990	501		−21.0%
2000	554		10.6%
2010	594		7.2%
2020	555		−6.6%
2021 (est.)	560	▲	0.9%
U.S. Decennial Census

=== 2020 census ===
Winfall racial composition
Race	Number	Percentage
White (non-Hispanic)	298	53.69%
Black or African American (non-Hispanic)	198	35.68%
Asian	4	0.72%
Other/Mixed	39	7.03%
Hispanic or Latino	16	2.88%

As of the 2020 United States census, there were 555 people, 322 households, and 203 families residing in the town.

=== 2000 census ===
As of the census of 2000, there were 554 people, 234 households, and 153 families residing in the town. The population density was 259.0 inhabitants per square mile (100.0/km^{2}). There were 276 housing units at an average density of 129.0 per square mile (49.8/km^{2}). The racial makeup of the town was 61.73% White, 37.73% African American, and 0.54% from two or more races. Hispanic or Latino of any race were 0.54% of the population.

There were 234 households, out of which 25.6% had children under the age of 18 living with them, 50.0% were married couples living together, 11.1% had a female householder with no husband present, and 34.2% were non-families. 30.3% of all households were made up of individuals, and 17.1% had someone living alone who was 65 years of age or older. The average household size was 2.37 and the average family size was 2.94.

In the town, the population was spread out, with 22.9% under the age of 18, 7.0% from 18 to 24, 24.7% from 25 to 44, 22.9% from 45 to 64, and 22.4% who were 65 years of age or older. The median age was 42 years. For every 100 females, there were 93.7 males. For every 100 females age 18 and over, there were 88.1 males.

The median income for a household in the town was $27,386, and the median income for a family was $30,417. Males had a median income of $27,083 versus $17,875 for females. The per capita income for the town was $13,587. About 12.6% of families and 17.8% of the population were below the poverty line, including 25.4% of those under age 18 and 18.1% of those age 65 or over.
