= Hertford, North Carolina =

- Town
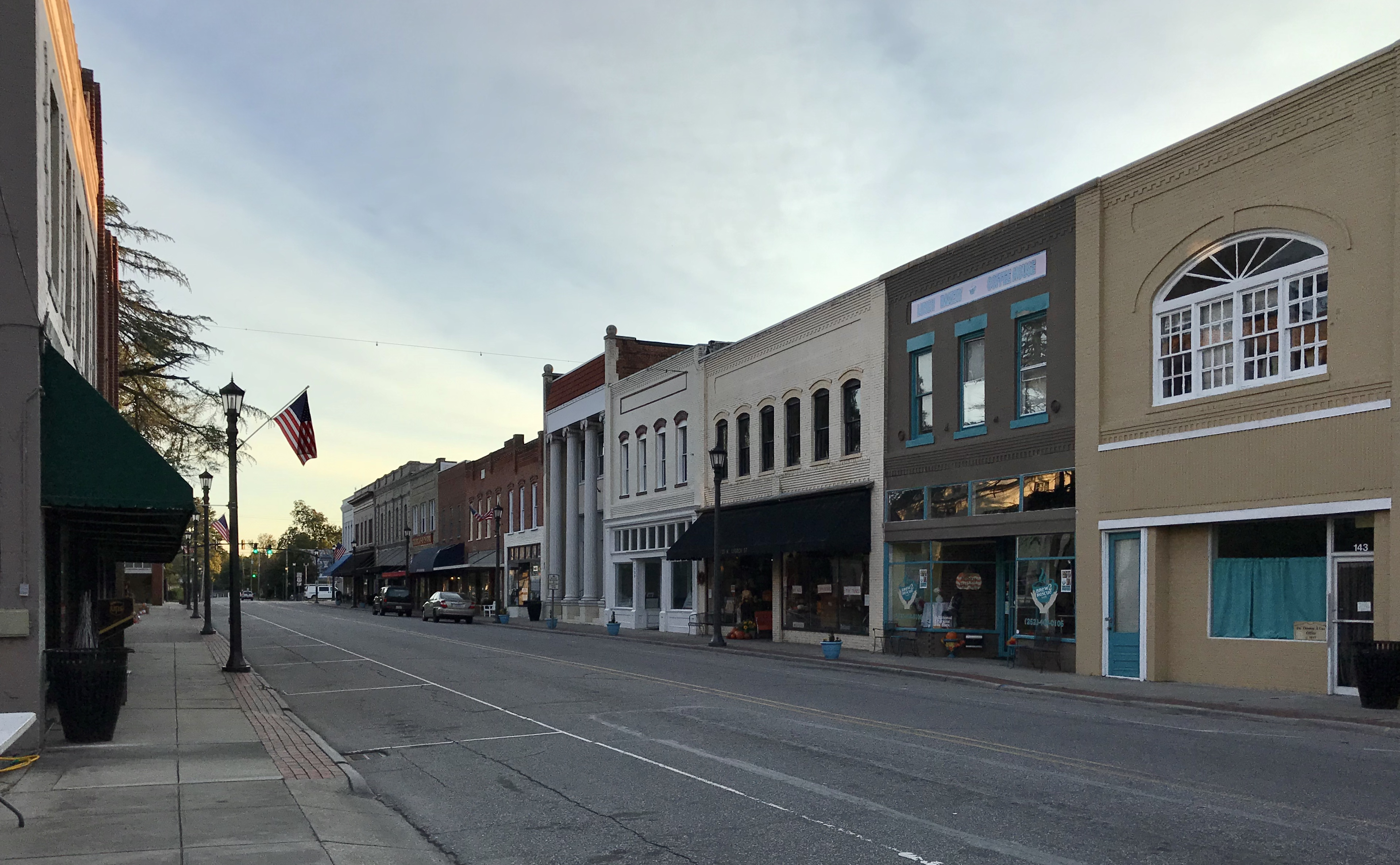
- North Church Street

- Seal

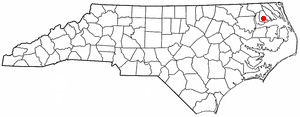
- Location of Hertford, North Carolina
- Coordinates: 36°10′53″N 76°28′03″W
- Country: United States
- State: North Carolina
- County: Perquimans
- Incorporated: 1758

Government
  - Mayor: Ashley Hodges
  - Town Manager: Doris Walton

Area
  - Total: 2.88 sq mi (7.47 km^{2})
  - Land: 2.86 sq mi (7.41 km^{2})
  - Water: 0.019 sq mi (0.05 km^{2})
- Elevation: 10 ft (3.0 m)

Population (2020)
  - Total: 1,934
  - Density: 675.9/sq mi (260.96/km^{2})
- Time zone: UTC-5 (Eastern (EST))
  - Summer (DST): UTC-4 (EDT)
- ZIP codes: 27930, 27944
- Area code: 252
- FIPS code: 37-30900
- GNIS feature ID: 2405821
- Website: townofhertfordnc.com

Hertford is a town and the county seat of Perquimans County, North Carolina, United States. The current population of Hertford, North Carolina is 1,912 based on the 2020 census. The US Census estimates the 2021 population at 1,925. Hertford is located in North Carolina's Inner Banks region and is part of both the Elizabeth City Micropolitan Statistical Area and the Hampton Roads region. It is named after the county town of Hertford, England.

== History ==
Hertford was originally incorporated in 1758 as the county seat for Perquimans County, first inhabited by the Yeopim Indians. County records show that the Yeopim chief Kalcacenin sold land to George Durant at the river mouth in March 1662, adjacent to land he had already sold to Samuel Pricklove. The area was settled soon afterward, and a brick house on the site, the Newbold-White House, has been dated by dendrochronology to 1730; it is the oldest known brick structure in the state.

Through the first part of the 20th century, Hertford thrived as a lumber town, making good use of the nearby river. The bridge that spanned the river was a floating bridge, made of steel and wood. When a boat came near and wanted passage, the bridge would be unhooked from one bank and allowed to float out of the way. When the boat had passed, lines were used to haul the free end of the bridge in and reconnect it. A swing bridge with S-shaped approaches is in use today.

Hertford is the hometown of baseball pitcher Catfish Hunter. Disc jockey Wolfman Jack is buried in nearby Belvidere, and the record company he started is still located in Hertford.

The Church of the Holy Trinity, Cove Grove, Fletcher-Skinner-Nixon House and Outbuildings, Hertford Historic District, Land's End, Newbold-White House, Samuel Nixon House, Old Neck Historic District, Perquimans County Courthouse, and Sutton-Newby House are listed on the National Register of Historic Places.

== Geography ==
According to the United States Census Bureau, the town has a total area of 2.7 square miles (7.0 km^{2}), of which, 2.7 square miles (7.0 km^{2}) of it is land and 0.04 square miles (0.10 km^{2}) of it (0.74%) is water.

Hertford is about 125 miles (201 km) northeast of Raleigh and about 47 miles (76 km) southwest of Norfolk.

== Demographics ==
Historical population
Census	Pop.	Note	%±
1850	369		—
1870	486		—
1880	661		36.0%
1890	733		10.9%
1900	1,382		88.5%
1910	1,841		33.2%
1920	1,704		−7.4%
1930	1,914		12.3%
1940	1,959		2.4%
1950	2,096		7.0%
1960	2,068		−1.3%
1970	2,023		−2.2%
1980	1,941		−4.1%
1990	2,105		8.4%
2000	2,070		−1.7%
2010	2,143		3.5%
2020	1,934		−9.8%
2021 (est.)	1,925	▼	−0.5%
U.S. Decennial Census

=== 2020 census ===
Hertford racial composition
Race	Number	Percentage
White (non-Hispanic)	956	49.43%
Black or African American (non-Hispanic)	790	40.85%
Native American	4	0.21%
Asian	2	0.1%
Other/Mixed	91	4.71%
Hispanic or Latino	91	4.71%

As of the 2020 United States census, there were 1,934 people, 1,045 households, and 612 families residing in the town.

=== 2010 census ===
As of the census of 2010, there were 2,143 people, 875 households, 553 families, and 1,062 housing units residing in the town. The racial makeup of the town was 48.1% African American, 46.5% white, 0.4% Asian, 0.1% Native American, 3.5% some other race, and 1.4% from two or more races. Hispanic Latino of any race were 4.8% of the population.

There were 875 households, out of which 26.5% had children under the age of 18 living with them, 33.9% were married couples living together, 25.8% had a female householder with no husband present, and 36.8% were non-families. 32.8% of all households had individuals under 18 and 31% had someone living alone who was 65 years of age or older. The average household size was 2.38 and the average family size was 3.01.

In the town, the population was spread out, with 27.7% with an age of 19 or younger, 13.7% in their twenties, 14.8% from 30 to 44, 25.3% from 45 to 64, and 18.5% who were 65 years of age or older. The median age was 38.6 years. For every 100 females, there were 79.0 males.

In 2008, the median income for a household in the town was $19,681, and the median income for a family was $24,524. Males had a median income of $24,803 versus $17,938 for females. The per capita income for the town was $13,502. About 33.6% of families and 39.2% of the population were below the poverty line, including 56.6% of those under age 18 and 21.0% of those age 65 or over.

== Transportation ==
Hertford is served by U.S. Route 17 (US 17) which connects the town with Edenton to the south and Elizabeth City to the north. A business route of US 17 also exists, which connects Hertford to the neighboring town of Winfall and crosses over the Perquimans River.

North Carolina Highway 37 also travels through Hertford, concurrent with US 17.

Local public bus transportation is provided by the Inter-County Public Transportation Authority (ICPTA), with service to Pasquotank, Perquimans, Camden, Chowan, and Currituck counties.

== Education ==
- Perquimans County Schools
  - Hertford Grammar School, serving grades 3–5
  - Perquimans County High School, serving grades 9–12

Grades PK–2 and 6–8 are served by the county schools located in Winfall.

== Industry ==
Agriculture is the chief industry of the area.

== Notable people ==
- Beulah Burke, one of the original founders of Alpha Kappa Alpha sorority
- Lillie Burke, one of the original founders of Alpha Kappa Alpha and sister of Beulah Burke
- Edward "Little Buster" Forehand, soul and blues musician
- Jim "Catfish" Hunter, former MLB pitcher, 8x All-Star selection and 5x World Series champion, member of the National Baseball Hall of Fame
- Abe Manley, sports executive
- Harry Skinner, U.S. Representative from North Carolina
- Louise Nixon Sutton, mathematician
