= Perquimans County, North Carolina =

County in North Carolina, United States

- County
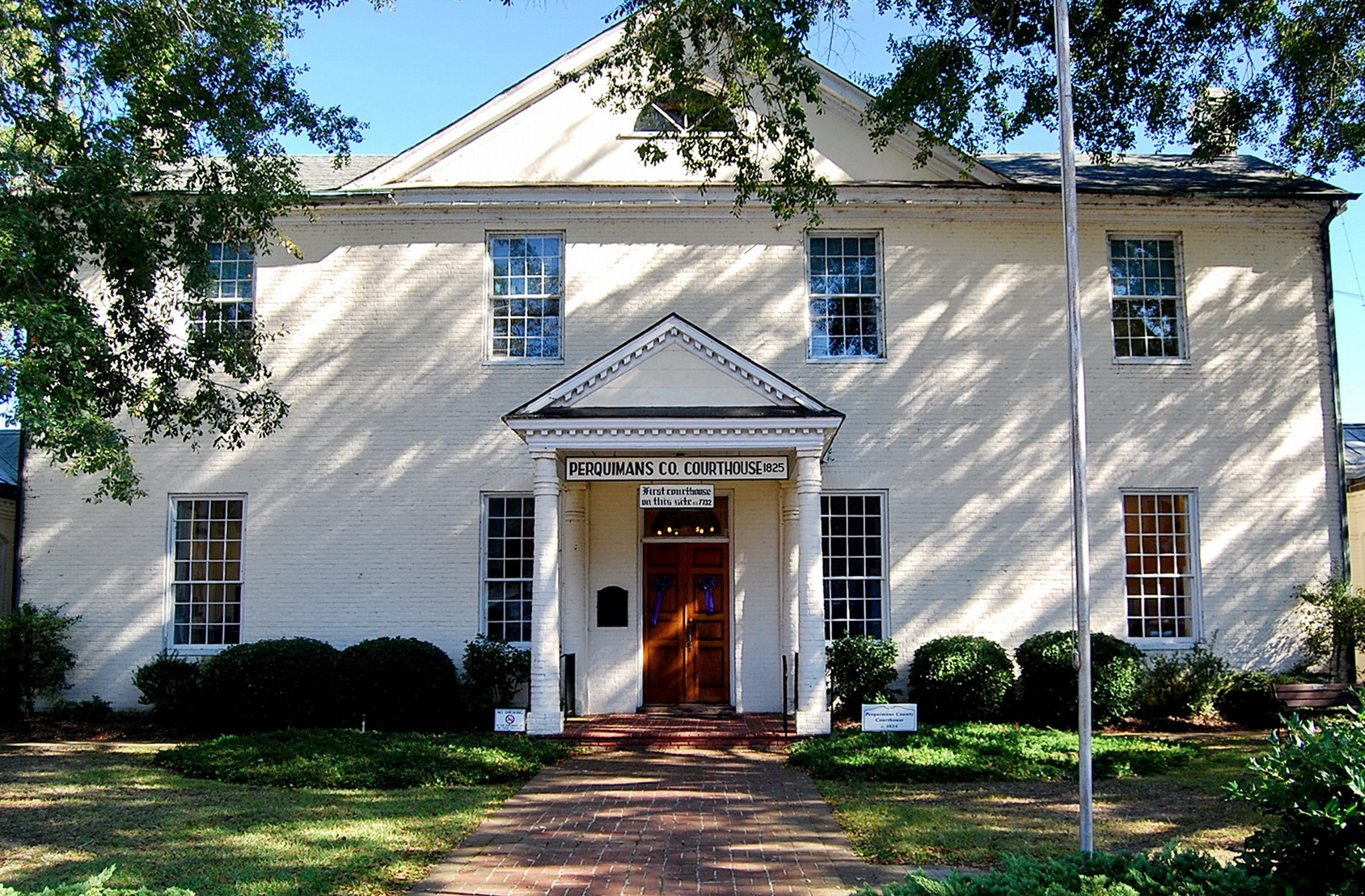
- Perquimans County Courthouse

- Seal Logo

- Location within the U.S. state of North Carolina
- Coordinates: 36.18°N 76.40°W
- Country: United States
- State: North Carolina
- Founded: 1668
- Named for: Yeopim word meaning "The land of beautiful women"
- Seat: Hertford
- Largest community: Hertford

Area
  - Total: 328.93 sq mi (851.9 km^{2})
  - Land: 247.17 sq mi (640.2 km^{2})
  - Water: 81.76 sq mi (211.8 km^{2}) 24.86%

Population (2020)
  - Total: 13,005
  - Estimate (2025): 13,490 ▲
  - Density: 52.62/sq mi (20.32/km^{2})
- Time zone: UTC−5 (Eastern)
  - Summer (DST): UTC−4 (EDT)
- Congressional district: 1st
- Website: www.perquimanscountync.gov

Perquimans County (/pɜːrˈkwɪmənz/ pur-KWIM-unz) is a county located in the U.S. state of North Carolina. As of the 2020 census, the population was 13,005. Its county seat is Hertford. The Harvey Point Defense Testing Activity facility is located in Perquimans County.

== History ==
The county was originally created as Berkeley Precinct. It was renamed Perquimans Precinct around 1684 and gained county status in 1739. The largest community and county seat is Hertford.

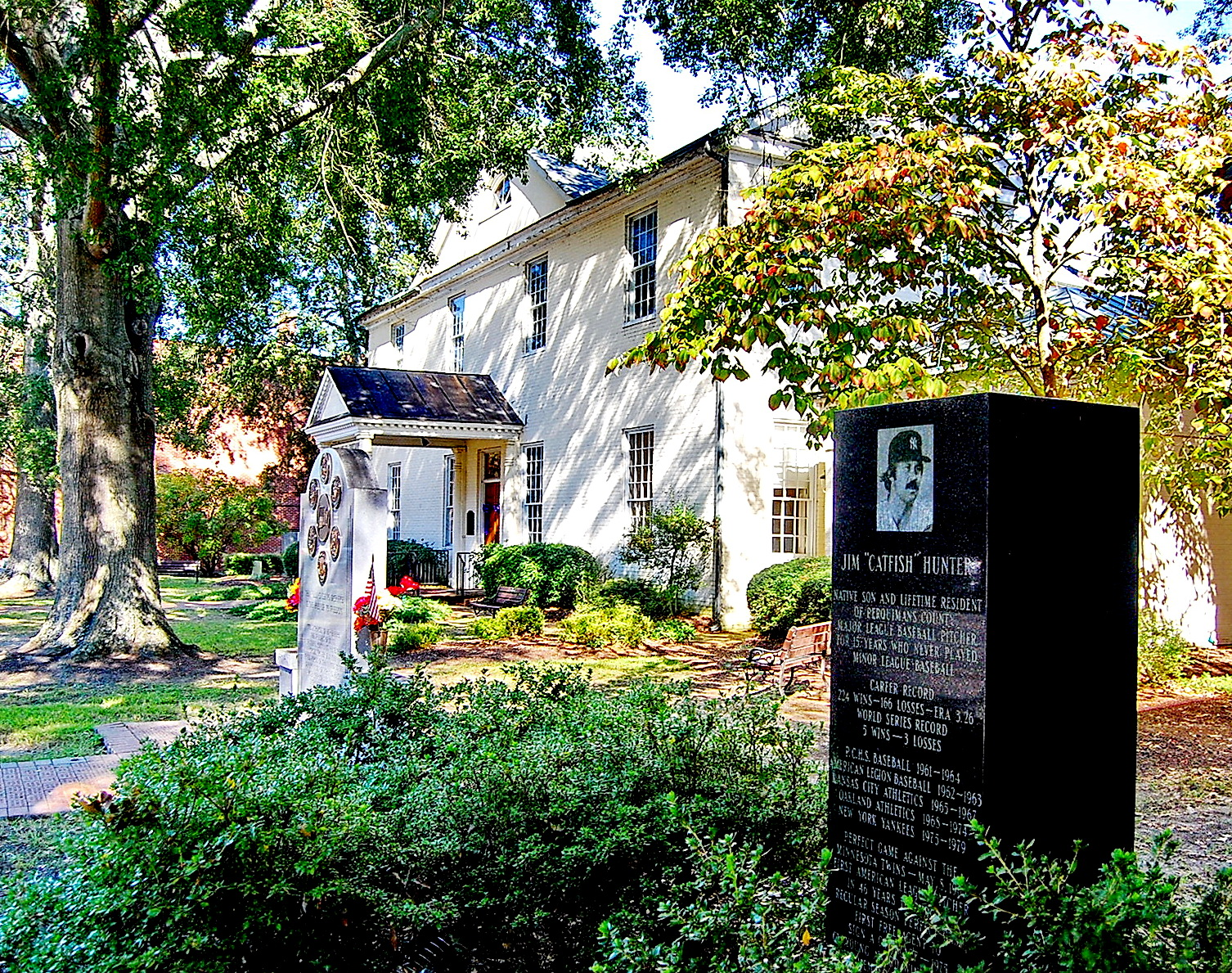
Courthouse and the Jim "Catfish" Hunter Memorial

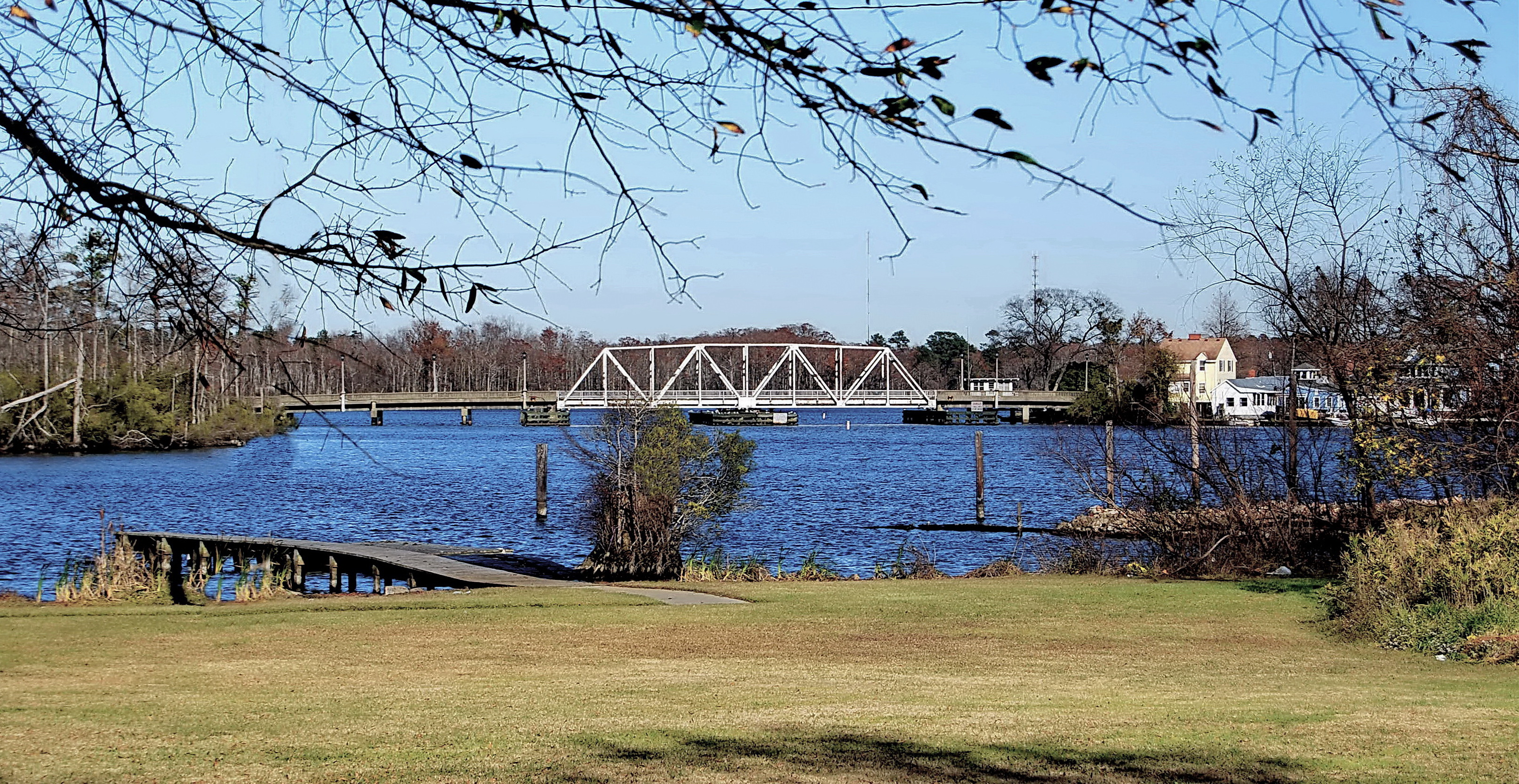
The Perquimans River and the "S" Bridge.

== Geography ==
Interactive map of Perquimans County

According to the U.S. Census Bureau, the county has a total area of 328.93 square miles (851.9 km^{2}), of which 247.17 square miles (640.2 km^{2}) is land and 81.76 square miles (211.8 km^{2}) (24.86%) is water.

=== Major water bodies ===
- Albemarle Sound
- Little River
- Perquimans River

=== Adjacent counties ===
- Gates County – northwest
- Pasquotank County – east
- Tyrrell County – south
- Washington County – south
- Chowan County – southwest

=== Major highways ===
- Future I-87
- US 17
- US 17 Bus.
- NC 37

== Demographics ==
Historical population
Census	Pop.	Note	%±
1790	5,439		—
1800	5,708		4.9%
1810	6,052		6.0%
1820	6,857		13.3%
1830	7,419		8.2%
1840	7,346		−1.0%
1850	7,332		−0.2%
1860	7,238		−1.3%
1870	7,945		9.8%
1880	9,466		19.1%
1890	9,293		−1.8%
1900	10,091		8.6%
1910	11,054		9.5%
1920	11,137		0.8%
1930	10,668		−4.2%
1940	9,773		−8.4%
1950	9,602		−1.7%
1960	9,178		−4.4%
1970	8,351		−9.0%
1980	9,486		13.6%
1990	10,447		10.1%
2000	11,368		8.8%
2010	13,453		18.3%
2020	13,005		−3.3%
2025 (est.)	13,490	▲	3.7%
U.S. Decennial Census; 1790–1960 1900–1990; 1990–2000 2010 2020

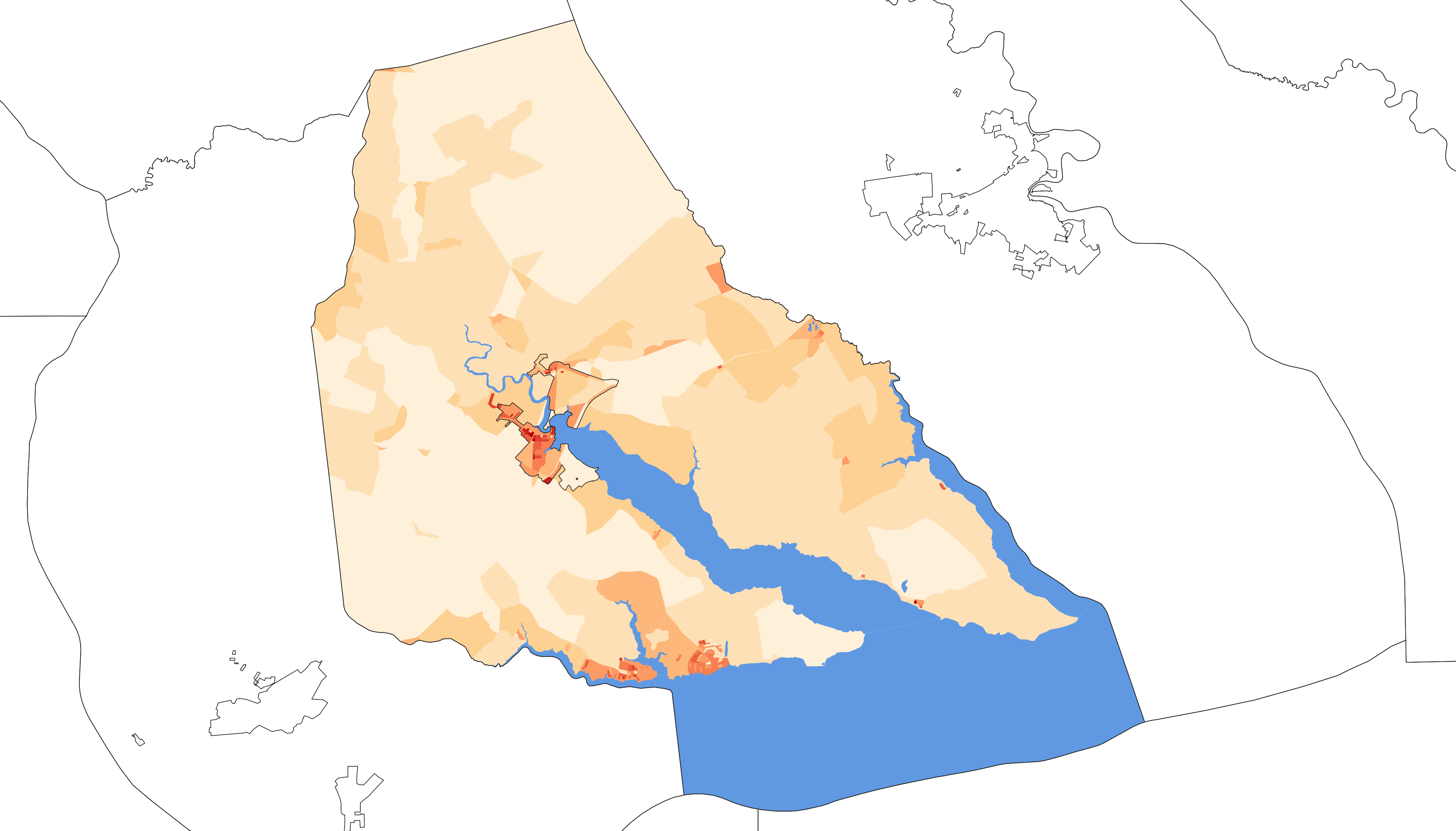
2020 population density of Perquimans County NC by census block

=== 2020 census ===
Perquimans County, North Carolina – Racial and ethnic composition Note: the US Census treats Hispanic/Latino as an ethnic category. This table excludes Latinos from the racial categories and assigns them to a separate category. Hispanics/Latinos may be of any race.
Race / Ethnicity (NH = Non-Hispanic)	Pop 1980	Pop 1990	Pop 2000	Pop 2010	Pop 2020	% 1980	% 1990	% 2000	% 2010	% 2020
White alone (NH)	5,855	6,959	8,015	9,608	9,333	61.72%	66.61%	70.50%	71.42%	71.76%
Black or African American alone (NH)	3,533	3,421	3,167	3,328	2,686	37.24%	32.75%	27.86%	24.74%	20.65%
Native American or Alaska Native alone (NH)	12	18	20	39	35	0.13%	0.17%	0.18%	0.29%	0.27%
Asian alone (NH)	4	20	24	36	36	0.04%	0.19%	0.21%	0.27%	0.28%
Native Hawaiian or Pacific Islander alone (NH)	x	x	3	2	7	x	x	0.03%	0.01%	0.05%
Other race alone (NH)	0	1	3	8	41	0.00%	0.01%	0.03%	0.06%	0.32%
Mixed race or Multiracial (NH)	x	x	68	146	558	x	x	0.60%	1.09%	4.29%
Hispanic or Latino (any race)	82	28	68	286	309	0.86%	0.27%	0.60%	2.13%	2.38%
Total	9,486	10,447	11,368	13,453	13,005	100.00%	100.00%	100.00%	100.00%	100.00%

As of the 2020 census, the county had a population of 13,005, 5,566 households, and 4,023 families residing within its borders.

The median age was 50.7 years; 18.6% of residents were under the age of 18 and 27.3% were 65 years of age or older. For every 100 females there were 92.6 males, and for every 100 females age 18 and over there were 92.9 males age 18 and over.

Of the 5,566 households, 24.5% had children under the age of 18 living in them. Of all households, 50.4% were married-couple households, 18.1% were households with a male householder and no spouse or partner present, and 26.2% were households with a female householder and no spouse or partner present. About 27.5% of all households were made up of individuals and 14.3% had someone living alone who was 65 years of age or older.

There were 6,866 housing units, of which 18.9% were vacant. Among occupied housing units, 76.3% were owner-occupied and 23.7% were renter-occupied. The homeowner vacancy rate was 2.5% and the rental vacancy rate was 6.3%.

The racial makeup of the county was 72.4% White, 20.9% Black or African American, 0.3% American Indian and Alaska Native, 0.3% Asian, 0.1% Native Hawaiian and Pacific Islander, 1.0% from some other race, and 5.0% from two or more races. Hispanic or Latino residents of any race comprised 2.4% of the population.

Less than 0.1% of residents lived in urban areas, while 100.0% lived in rural areas.

=== 2000 census ===
At the 2000 census, there were 11,368 people, 4,645 households, and 3,376 families residing in the county. The population density was 46 people per square mile (18 people/km^{2}). There were 6,043 housing units at an average density of 24 units per square mile (9.3 units/km^{2}). The racial makeup of the county was 70.82% White, 27.99% Black or African American, 0.18% Native American, 0.21% Asian, 0.03% Pacific Islander, 0.13% from other races, and 0.64% from two or more races. 0.60% of the population were Hispanic or Latino of any race. There were 4,645 households, of which 28.20% had children under the age of 18 living with them, 56.50% were married couples living together, 12.60% had a female householder with no husband present, and 27.30% were non-families. 24.10% of all households were made up of individuals, and 11.90% had someone living alone who was 65 years of age or older. The average household size was 2.42 and the average family size was 2.86.

23.00% of the population were under the age of 18, 6.80% from 18 to 24, 24.40% from 25 to 44, 26.60% from 45 to 64, and 19.30% who were 65 years of age or older. The median age was 42 years. For every 100 females there were 91.30 males. For every 100 females age 18 and over, there were 87.50 males.

The median household income was $29,538 and the median family income was $35,212. Males had a median income of $27,251 compared with $18,728 for females. The per capita income for the county was $15,728. About 13.90% of families and 17.90% of the population were below the poverty line, including 27.20% of those under age 18 and 15.80% of those age 65 or over.

== Government and politics ==
Perquimans County is a member of the Albemarle Commission regional council of governments.

United States presidential election results for Perquimans County, North Carolina
Year	Republican		Democratic		Third party(ies)	
Year	No.	%	No.	%	No.	%
1912	228	24.81%	647	70.40%	44	4.79%
1916	288	30.84%	645	69.06%	1	0.11%
1920	487	31.85%	1,042	68.15%	0	0.00%
1924	295	34.58%	550	64.48%	8	0.94%
1928	600	49.63%	609	50.37%	0	0.00%
1932	225	14.93%	1,280	84.94%	2	0.13%
1936	161	14.24%	970	85.76%	0	0.00%
1940	228	16.24%	1,176	83.76%	0	0.00%
1944	266	21.70%	960	78.30%	0	0.00%
1948	135	12.74%	849	80.09%	76	7.17%
1952	644	34.09%	1,245	65.91%	0	0.00%
1956	709	40.96%	1,022	59.04%	0	0.00%
1960	637	30.38%	1,460	69.62%	0	0.00%
1964	941	39.22%	1,458	60.78%	0	0.00%
1968	468	15.37%	1,023	33.60%	1,554	51.03%
1972	1,299	62.57%	723	34.83%	54	2.60%
1976	909	35.23%	1,666	64.57%	5	0.19%
1980	1,210	42.40%	1,560	54.66%	84	2.94%
1984	1,939	57.28%	1,441	42.57%	5	0.15%
1988	1,781	53.32%	1,543	46.20%	16	0.48%
1992	1,429	36.85%	1,818	46.88%	631	16.27%
1996	1,561	38.88%	2,069	51.53%	385	9.59%
2000	2,230	51.79%	2,033	47.21%	43	1.00%
2004	2,965	59.80%	1,971	39.75%	22	0.44%
2008	3,678	56.58%	2,772	42.64%	51	0.78%
2012	3,822	57.46%	2,759	41.48%	71	1.07%
2016	4,177	62.27%	2,319	34.57%	212	3.16%
2020	4,903	65.51%	2,492	33.30%	89	1.19%
2024	5,278	68.85%	2,269	29.60%	119	1.55%

== Education ==
The county is served by Perquimans County Schools, the only school district in the county.

== Communities ==
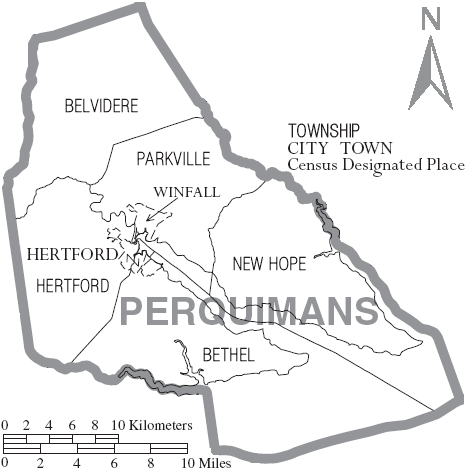
Map of Perquimans County with municipal and township labels

=== Towns ===
- Hertford (county seat and largest community)
- Winfall

=== Unincorporated communities ===
- Belvidere
- Woodville (also in Pasquotank County)
- New Hope

=== Townships ===
- Belvidere
- Bethel
- Hertford
- New Hope
- Parkville

== Notable people ==
- Janice Cole, U.S. Attorney
- Catfish Hunter, professional baseball pitcher for the Kansas City/Oakland A's and New York Yankees and member of the Hall of Fame.
- Wolfman Jack, radio personality

== See also ==
- List of counties in North Carolina
- National Register of Historic Places listings in Perquimans County, North Carolina
