= Edward H. Sutton =

American inventor, author and politician

Edward H. Sutton was an inventor, author, and state legislator in North Carolina. He served in the state legislature in 1883. He lived in Edenton, North Carolina.

An African American, he served with James W. Poe, A. R. Bridgers, Wiley Baker, James H. Harris, and John Newell.

He patented a "cotton cultivator".

== See also ==
- African American officeholders from the end of the Civil War until before 1900
