= Wiley Baker =

American politician

Wiley Baker (1850 or 1851 – ?) was a state legislator in North Carolina. He represented Northampton County in the North Carolina House of Representatives in 1883.

He was born in 1850 or 1851 and educated following the American Civil War. He was African American. A farmer who lived in Dogwood, North Carolina, he also served as a county official. He was one of a few Republicans – alongside William Belcher, Turner Speller, and Edward H. Sutton, among others – who generally opposed the creation of public schools for white cities in counties with significant black populations. He served on a committee for the state's Deaf, Dumb, and Blind Asylum alongside Jacob Montgomery, James Harris, and William Johnson.

There is no record of his life after the 1890s, and he may have died outside of North Carolina.

== See also ==
- African American officeholders from the end of the Civil War until before 1900
- List of first African-American U.S. state legislators
