= Tornado outbreak of April 14–16, 2011 =

Tornado outbreak in the United States

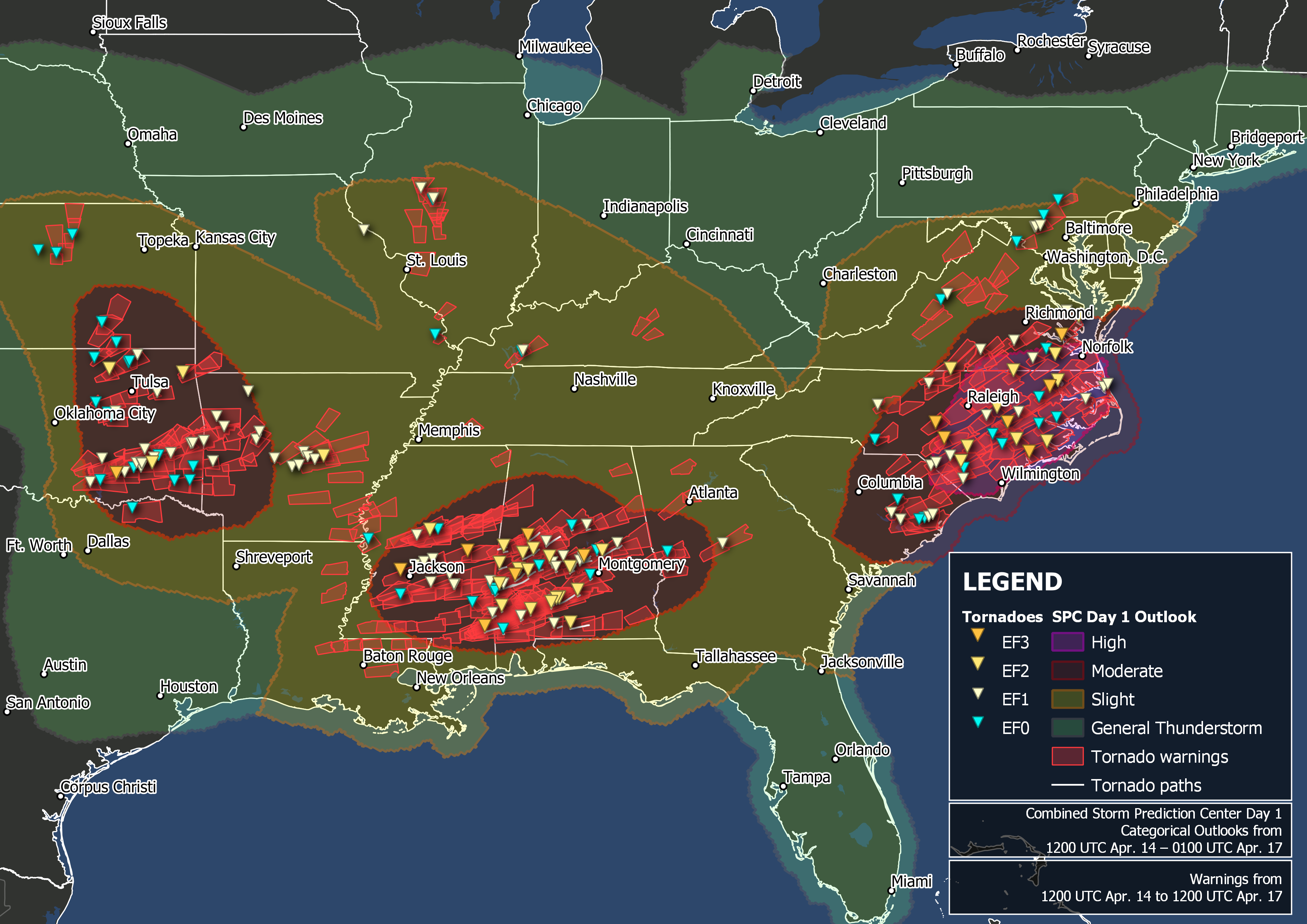
- Map of tornado warnings and confirmed tornadoes from the outbreak.

Meteorological history
- Duration: April 14–16, 2011

Tornado outbreak
- Tornadoes: 179
- Max. rating: EF3 tornado
- Duration: 2 days, 4 hours, 20 minutes
- Highest winds: Tornadic – 160 mph (260 km/h) (Sanford, North Carolina EF3 on April 16)
- Highest gusts: Non-tornadic – 70 mph (110 km/h) in northern New York
- Largest hail: 4.25 inches (10.8 cm) in several locations

Category 1 "Notable" blizzard
- Regional snowfall index: 1.83 (NOAA)
- Max. snowfall: Snow – 16 in (41 cm) in Paxton, Nebraska; Ice – 0.3 in (7.6 mm) near Pike Lake, Michigan

Extratropical cyclone
- Lowest pressure: 984 hPa (mbar); 29.06 inHg

Overall effects
- Fatalities: 38 fatalities (+5 non-tornadic)
- Injuries: 588 injuries
- Damage: $2.1 billion (2011 USD)
- Areas affected: High Plains, Central, Midwestern, Eastern United States
- Part of the tornado outbreaks of 2011 and the 2010–11 North American winter

From April 14–16, 2011, a tornado outbreak, among the largest recorded tornado outbreaks in U.S. history, produced 179 confirmed tornadoes across 16 states, resulting in severe destruction on all three days of the outbreak. A total of 38 people were killed from tornadoes and an additional five people were killed as a result of straight-line winds associated with the storm system. The outbreak of severe weather and tornadoes led to 43 deaths in the Southern United States. This was the largest number of fatalities in an outbreak in the United States since the 2008 Super Tuesday tornado outbreak. It is locally referred to as the "Forgotten Outbreak" in Alabama as it was vastly overshadowed by the 2011 Super Outbreak less than two weeks later.

The system brought a late-season snowstorm to the Midwest and Northern Plains, and blizzard conditions to parts of South Dakota and northern Nebraska. With surface temperatures near freezing the snow was unusually wet for the region. This led for bad driving conditions on I-80 and I-90.

== Meteorological synopsis ==
=== April 14 ===
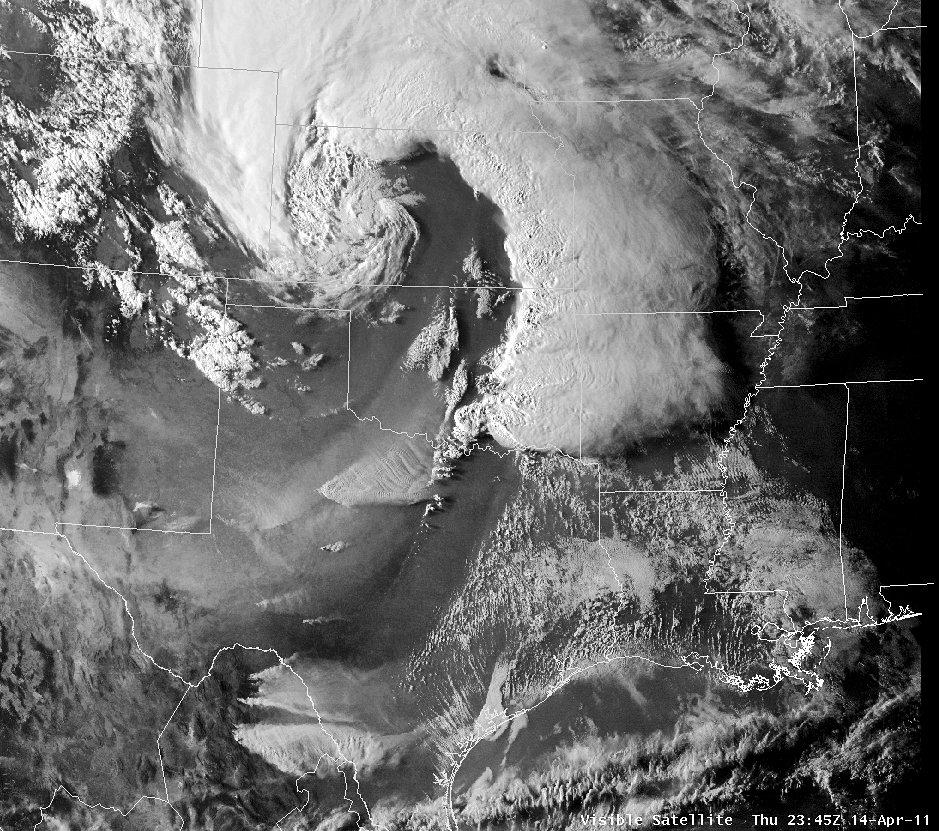
Visible satellite image of the storm at 2345 UTC on April 14

On April 14, a strong storm system in the southern section of the Rocky Mountains moved east to the central and southern Great Plains region during the afternoon and to the mid and lower Mississippi River Valley during the overnight hours. The system was accompanied by strong winds in the middle and high levels of the atmosphere along with cold upper air temperatures. These elements combined with moisture moving north from the Gulf of Mexico, resulting in conditions favorable for severe weather. A moderate risk of severe weather was issued for that day by the Storm Prediction Center as a result across eastern Oklahoma and neighboring parts of Arkansas, Kansas, Missouri and Texas. With a dryline extending from southern Kansas to Texas, thunderstorms began developing along the dryline across north and south central areas of Oklahoma by 3:10 pm CDT (2010 UTC). These storms would form into supercells and move into eastern Oklahoma by 4:00 pm CDT (2100 UTC).

Storm chasers in the region reported multiple funnel clouds and two touchdowns, neither of which resulted in damage. Several tornadoes were confirmed through storm chaser video and local emergency management services. A large, intense tornado later caused severe damage in and around the towns of Atoka and Tushka. Many houses were destroyed or flattened from what was at times a double tornado with two well-defined vortices. Numerous injuries were reported in the latter of these areas. Two died and 43 more were injured in Tushka. In Arkansas, strong winds produced by thunderstorms killed at least seven people. Of those deaths, five were confirmed to have been from straight-line winds and two were as a result of a weak tornado embedded in an overnight squall line that tracked across the state.

=== April 15 ===
A moderate risk of severe weather also existed for April 15 across much of Alabama and Mississippi. During the pre-dawn hours into the morning of April 15, tornadic activity temporarily waned with only isolated activity. However, by late that morning, supercell thunderstorms developed again over parts of Mississippi, and tornadoes began to touch down again. A tornado emergency was declared for the northern Jackson metropolitan area shortly after 11:00 am CDT (1600 UTC), as a result of a widely photographed tornado that moved through parts of the city and the adjoining city of Clinton. The destructive tornado moved across the area producing severe damage and numerous injuries according to WLBT coverage. That afternoon, Mississippi State University spotters confirmed another large tornado in east-central Mississippi and west-central Alabama and the second tornado emergency of the outbreak was issued. ABC 33/40 coverage reported that the tornado was 3/4 mile (1.2 km) in width.

Two additional tornado emergencies were also issued that afternoon for other storms in Attala County, Mississippi, and Choctaw County, Alabama, and a fifth such issuance occurred near Leakesville, Mississippi, that evening, where a large EF3 wedge tornado produced severe damage and 4 fatalities. Local storm reports report at least 7 fatalities from the storms on April 15.

=== April 16 ===
Outbreak death toll
State/Province	Total	County	County total
Alabama	7	Autauga	3
Alabama	7	Marengo	1
Alabama	7	Washington	2
Arkansas	2	Pulaski	2
Mississippi	1	Greene	1
North Carolina	24	Bertie	12
North Carolina	24	Bladen	4
North Carolina	24	Cumberland	1
North Carolina	24	Harnett	1
North Carolina	24	Lee	2
North Carolina	24	Wake	4
Virginia	2	Gloucester	2
Totals	38		
Only tornado-related deaths are included

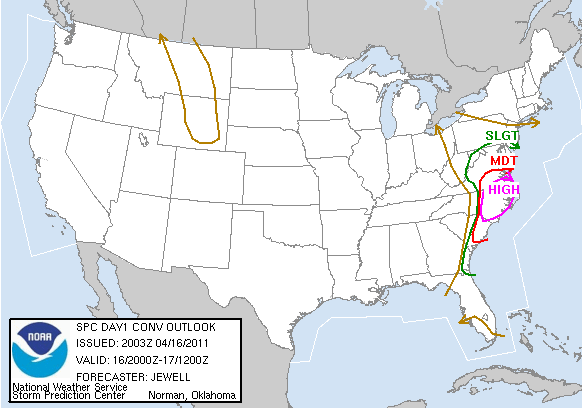
A high risk of severe weather was issued on April 16 for most of eastern North Carolina, and parts of southeast Virginia and northeast South Carolina

The next day, a moderate risk of severe weather was issued for April 16 for the Carolinas and southern Virginia as the cold front tracked eastward and a mesolow developed across the Appalachians. As storms began moving into areas of strong atmospheric instability, a PDS Tornado Watch was issued shortly after noon and a high risk, the first of 2011, was issued shortly thereafter at 12:30 pm EDT (1630 UTC) for central and eastern North Carolina and immediate adjacent areas in South Carolina and Virginia. A squall line descended the Blue Ridge, and rapidly intensified along the Interstate 77 corridor.

As this line tracked eastward, wind damage was reported in Salisbury and Lexington, where tree and roof damage was widespread. The Salisbury storm - an EF1 - became the first confirmed tornado from the outbreak in North Carolina, followed shortly thereafter by tornadoes near Monroe (EF0) and north of Burlington (EF1). The Burlington area storm would mature into the first of multiple long-tracked, multi-tornado tornadic supercells, producing additional tornadoes near Roxboro and South Hill, Virginia.

Moving rapidly to the east, the squall line entered areas that had experienced sunnier weather earlier in the day, and the squall line began to rapidly fragment into powerful discrete supercells by early afternoon. Explosive wind shear also made the atmosphere extremely prime for tornadic development. At about 3:15 pm EDT (1915 UTC), a tornado emergency - the sixth of the outbreak - was issued for an especially intense tornado in the Raleigh-Durham metropolitan area. This cell had developed in Moore County, and had at one point been a very strong, high-end EF3 tornado in the city of Sanford. A very prominent hook echo was easily visible on local radar returns, with a hail core and debris aloft also reflected in radar imagery.

This storm, which may have been a mile wide, tracked through the southeast edge of downtown Raleigh, on a southwest-to-northeast trajectory that passed through miles of suburbs surrounding the city. While damage in Wake County fluctuated between EF0 and EF2, it was accompanied by debris fallout from the Sanford area, when the storm was far more violent. Tracking through Raleigh, the tornado crossed three interstate highways, and narrowly missed a nuclear power plant as it moved from southwest to northeast through the densely populated (900,000+ population) county. The campus of Shaw University in downtown Raleigh was so severely damaged that classes were suspended for the remainder of the semester.

Soon afterwards, two additional tornado emergencies were issued farther south and east, as radar images of the developing supercells indicated very prominent hook echoes. Of the larger cities in eastern North Carolina, Fayetteville, Jacksonville, and Wilson all endured direct hits from EF2 or EF3 tornadoes. A tornado or tornado family that began in the city of Fayetteville, briefly closed interstate 95 in Johnston County, due to debris blocking the highway.

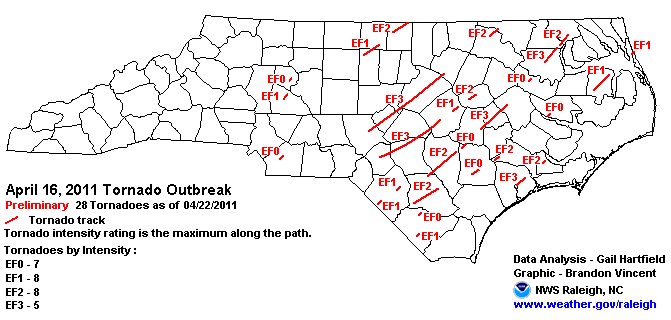
Map of all tornado tracks in North Carolina on April 16

Late in the outbreak and farther into northeastern North Carolina, another EF3 tornado in Askewville, North Carolina, in rural Bertie County caused 12 fatalities and extensive damage in the towns of Askewville and Colerain, just west of the Chowan River. Additional destructive tornadoes - produced by the same line of supercells - caused damage northwest of the Charleston metropolitan area, and at several locations in the northeastern part of South Carolina, including Dillon County and multiple locations in Georgetown County.

Approximate touchdown location of tornadoes from April 14–16, 2011
- EF0 (65–85 mph (104–137 km/h))
- EF1 (86–110 mph (138–177 km/h))
- EF2 (111–135 mph (178–217 km/h))
- EF3 (136–165 mph (218–266 km/h))
- EF4 (166–200 mph (267–322 km/h))
- EF5 (>200 mph (>322 km/h))

Tornadoes also struck several locations in Virginia, including a destructive tornado in Gloucester County and a brief tornado 300 miles to the west in Rockbridge County. A tornado touched down in the switchyard of the Surry Nuclear Power Plant in southeastern Virginia, cutting off external power to the plant and leading its two reactors to trip. Because of this, a NRC Unusual Event, the lowest level of emergency, was declared. Diesel backup power was restored after a brief outage and the shutdown and cooling of the plant proceeded as designed with no physical damage to the reactors or release of radiation. A fuel oil leak occurred at an above-ground storage tank near the station's garage. The supercells finally emerged into the Atlantic Ocean late that evening, ending the tornado outbreak after over 52 hours.

== Confirmed tornadoes ==
Confirmed tornadoes by Enhanced Fujita rating
EFU	EF0	EF1	EF2	EF3	EF4	EF5	Total
0	52	81	33	13	0	0	179

=== De Kalb, Mississippi/Geiger, Alabama ===
De Kalb, Mississippi/Geiger, Alabama
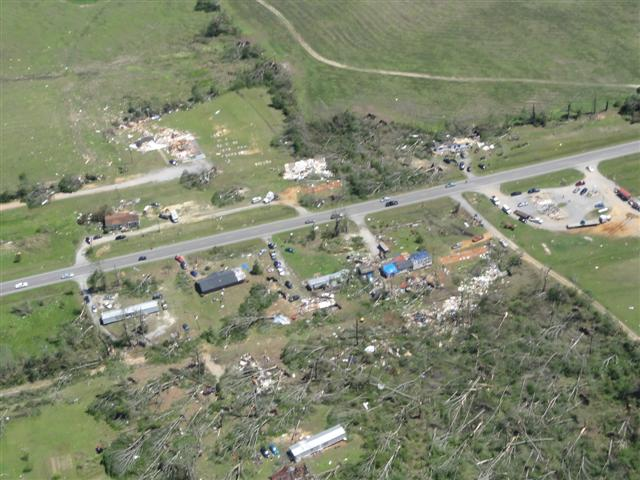
- EF3 damage south of Geiger, Alabama.

Meteorological history
- Formed: April 15, 2011, 12:53 p.m. CDT (UTC–05:00)
- Dissipated: April 15, 2011, 2:05 p.m. CDT (UTC–05:00)
- Duration: 1 hour, 12 minutes

EF3 tornado
- on the Enhanced Fujita scale
- Highest winds: 150 mph (240 km/h)

Overall effects
- Casualties: 5 injuries
- Damage: $19.92 million (2011 USD)

This strong, long-tracked EF3 wedge tornado first touched down southeast of Philadelphia, Mississippi, in Neshoba County at 12:53 p.m. CDT (17:53 UTC). In the area of County Road 450, the tornado downed numerous trees, including many pine, before it pushed a mobile home over and damaged the roof of a house. Crossing MS 491, the tornado began to intensify, destroying a large portion of two chicken houses and causing extensive tree damage. It weakened slightly as it crossed County Road 729 and then moved into Kemper County soon after. A home sustained minor to moderate damage along County Road 729 just inside Neshoba County. The tornado intensified again, to EF3 intensity, as it approached Little Rock Road and MS 495. At this location, there was extensive structural damage to two frame homes, two mobile homes were completely destroyed (with debris being carried some distance away), several power poles were snapped, and some trees were debarked and denuded.

The tornado weakened a little but continued to cause extensive tree damage and downed power lines and poles as it moved east-northeast toward De Kalb, Mississippi. As the tornado crossed MS 16 west of De Kalb, it destroyed several mobile homes, heavily damaged the second story of a frame home, and caused roof damage to other frame homes. Extensive tree and power line damage also occurred in this area. Passing just north of the town of De Kalb, it again produced EF3-strength damage, completely destroying a double-wide mobile home (wrapping the frame around trees several hundred yards away and carrying remnants across a road a considerable distance away), causing intense tree damage, including denuded trees, and snapping power poles. Another mobile home was destroyed, and nearby site-built homes sustained roof damage.

As the tornado crossed MS 39, it continued causing extensive tree damage, with large swaths of land where nearly every tree was snapped, many of which were debarked. In addition, a site-built home suffered heavy roof and structural damage, another home sustained heavy roof damage, and several outbuildings were destroyed. Here, the tornado reached its maximum width at 3/4 mile (1.2 km), before weakening and narrowing a little and crossing MS 16 again, just west of Scooba. Numerous trees and a couple of power poles were snapped in this area. The tornado then crossed US 45 to the south of Scooba with a relatively narrow but intense damage swath that was rated high-end EF2 to low-end EF3. A large warehouse building was completely destroyed, three homes sustained roof damage, and a pickup truck was thrown a considerable distance. More intense tree damage occurred in this area with debarking and denuding. The tornado widened again east of Scooba, causing heavy damage along MS 16 near Giles Road. Several homes sustained heavy roof damage, power poles were snapped, and more trees were denuded. About 3200 acres of pine and hardwood forest were damaged in Kemper County.

The storm crossed into Sumter County, Alabama, as a wedge tornado at EF3 strength. The tornado immediately struck Geiger, causing extensive damage to numerous homes and businesses. According to ABC 33/40 coverage, numerous houses and many mobile homes were reported to be destroyed or flattened. East of town, thousands of trees were either snapped or uprooted before the tornado lifted at the Tombigbee River just before crossing into Greene County at 2:05 p.m. CDT (19:05 UTC). The tornado traversed 48.52 miles (78.09 km) across three counties, reaching maximum estimated winds of 140 to 150 mph (230 to 240 km/h). Five people were injured, all in Kemper County, Mississippi.

=== Sanford–Raleigh, North Carolina ===
Sanford–Raleigh, North Carolina
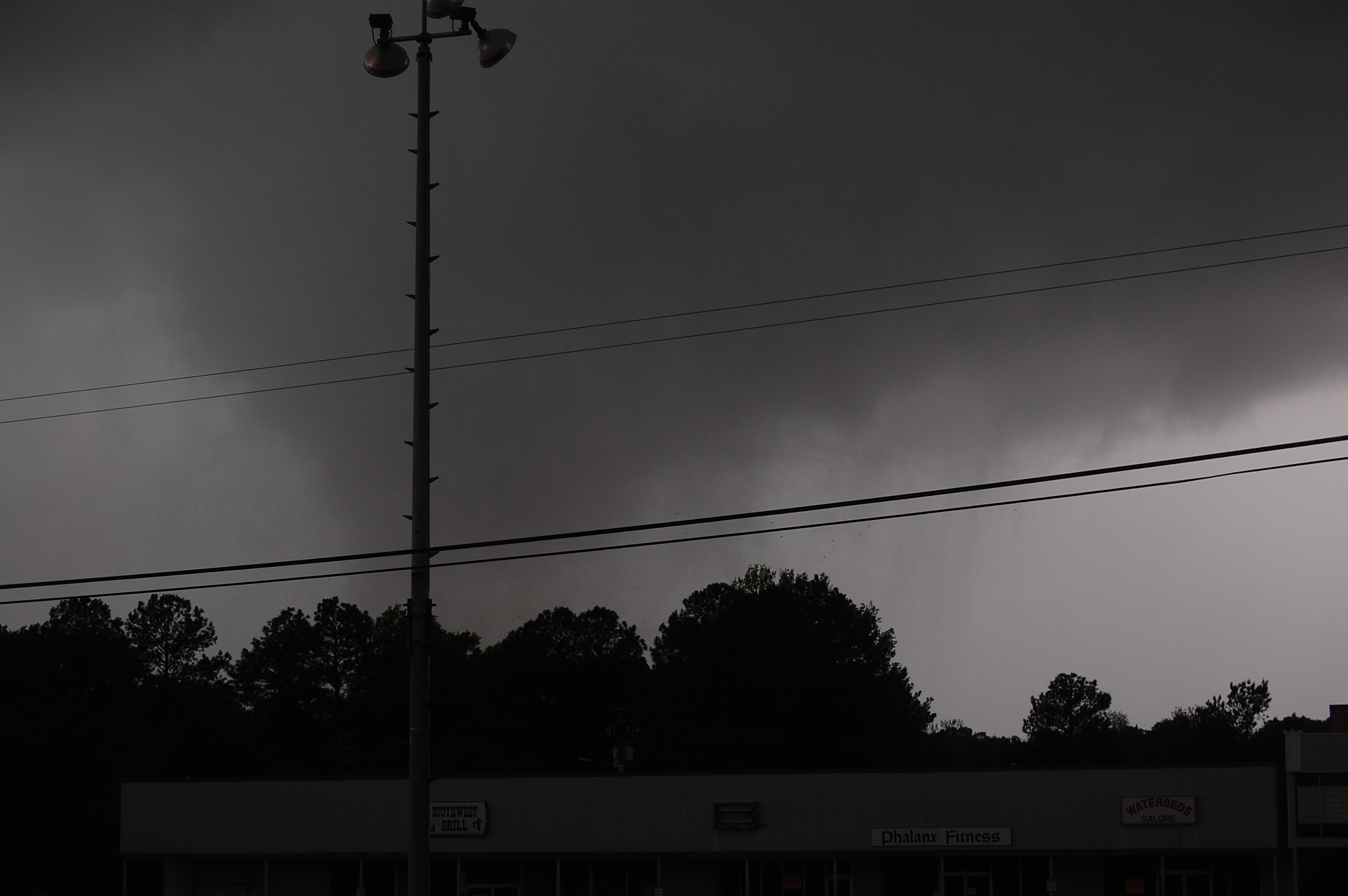
- The tornado as it was tracking through Sanford

Meteorological history
- Formed: April 16, 2011, 2:53 p.m. EDT (UTC–05:00)
- Dissipated: April 16, 2011, 4:15 p.m. EDT (UTC–05:00)
- Duration: 1 hour, 22 minutes

EF3 tornado
- on the Enhanced Fujita scale
- Highest winds: 160 mph (260 km/h)

Overall effects
- Casualties: 6 fatalities, 103 injuries
- Damage: $172 million (2011 USD)

At 2:53 p.m. EDT (18:53 UTC) on April 16, this very intense tornado developed around Sanford, North Carolina, in Lee County. A Lowe's Home Improvement Warehouse store in Sanford was destroyed; however, there were no fatalities or serious injuries there as staff spotted the approaching storm and rushed staff and customers to safety in time. Several retailers adjacent to Lowe's were also heavily damaged. In a nearby residential area, two people were killed, and 30 homes were destroyed. Some homes were reduced to rubble by the tornado. Aerial footage broadcast on WRAL showed a very wide debris path through the area. The most severe damage was in this area, rated as a high-end EF3, where three other warehouses were destroyed and two apartment buildings lost their upper levels. Mobile homes in the area were destroyed, and vehicles were thrown.

Generally maintaining its size and strength, the storm then paralleled US 1. It weakened southeast of the community of Moncure, in the southeast corner of Chatham County. Only a couple of homes sustained EF0-strength roof damage as the tornado passed through the area. As the storm continued into southwestern Wake County, a tornado emergency was issued for areas downstream, including the city of Raleigh.

Moving into the suburban southwest of Wake County, the tornado maintained EF0/EF1 intensity as it moved through the community of Holly Springs. However, many trees and power lines were downed, numerous houses were damaged, and several people were injured. In addition, debris tossed by the tornado was picked up by radar, and pieces of destroyed homes were reported to have fallen in the adjacent towns of Apex and Cary. The tornado continued to track northeast, in the direction of downtown Raleigh; by this time, a very sharply defined hook echo was visible on local radar. The tornado began passing through suburban subdivisions on the southwest side of Raleigh as it approached Downtown. Many homes sustained damage, mostly to roofs and from falling trees. The tornado maintained EF1 intensity as it passed through neighborhoods into downtown Raleigh. Severe damage was reported to many commercial businesses in the South Saunders Street (US 70) area south of downtown near I-40. Many local thoroughfares and neighborhoods were rendered impassable due to building debris, tree damage, and downed power lines. The Shaw University campus was badly damaged by the tornado. Live WRAL camera footage showed a rain-wrapped tornado approaching the city from the southwest and crossing I-40 at South Saunders Street, accompanied by power flashes and flying debris. Many homes and businesses in the Raleigh area were badly damaged. Damage in the downtown area was rated EF1.

After striking the downtown area, the tornado continued northeast, damaging Oakwood Cemetery and the St. Augustine's University campus. The tornado intensified again to EF2 strength as it passed through Raleigh's northeastern neighborhoods and subdivisions. Many homes were badly damaged, losing roofs and walls. Many trees and powerlines were downed, and some homes were nearly destroyed. Still on the ground, it continued to track northeast through the northeastern suburbs, tracking along Capital Boulevard (US 1 and US 401) before tracking through a mobile home park at 4:05 p.m. (20:05 UTC), producing severe damage and killing four people. The tornado passed near suburban Rolesville, before moving into Franklin County, where it lifted about 4:15 p.m. EDT (20:15 UTC).

The tornado was on the ground for 66.8 miles (107.5 km) and the tornado was about 500 yards (460 m) in width at its peak. It caused six fatalities, injured 103 other people, and lasted for 82 minutes. The parent supercell tracked from Moore County, North Carolina, to Franklin County to near Gloucester, Virginia, where it entered the Chesapeake Bay. Later tornadoes in Roanoke Rapids, North Carolina, Smithfield, Virginia, and Gloucester, Virginia, were all produced by this same long-lived supercell, which also generated reports of other types of damage throughout its entire lifespan. Early damage estimates were placed at $215 million at least, with $115 million in Raleigh and $100 million in Sanford, although the official estimate is $172 million.

=== Fayetteville–Fort Bragg, North Carolina ===
Fayetteville–Fort Bragg, North Carolina
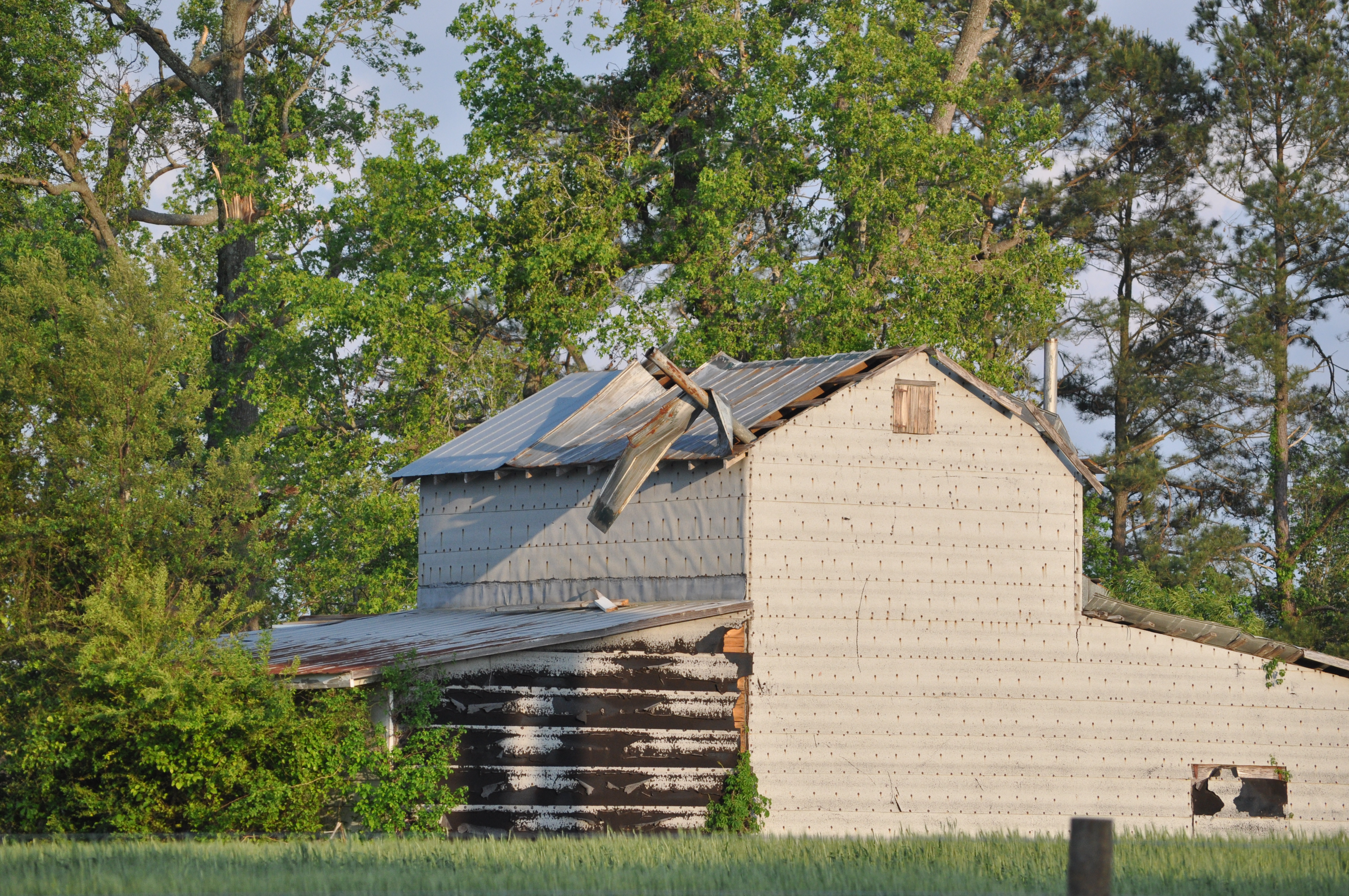
- Tornado damage near Dunn, NC

Meteorological history
- Formed: April 16, 2011, 3:33 p.m. EDT (UTC–05:00)
- Dissipated: April 16, 2011, 4:45 p.m. EDT (UTC–05:00)
- Duration: 1 hour, 2 minutes

EF3 tornado
- on the Enhanced Fujita scale
- Highest winds: 140 mph (230 km/h)

Overall effects
- Casualties: 2 fatalities, 176 injuries
- Damage: $141.1 million (2011 USD)

Another intense tornado formed at 3:33 p.m. EDT (19:33 UTC) in the Wayside community in Hoke County, 6 miles (9.7 km) northeast of Raeford. The tornado damaged homes in Hoke County near the Johnson Mill Road community. The strengthening storm entered Cumberland County and the northwestern parts of the city of Fayetteville, near US 401, and tracked northeast through parts of Fort Bragg and surrounding neighborhoods. Numerous homes and businesses were destroyed in the Fayetteville area. Most damage in this early stage of the storm fluctuated between EF0 and EF2 in intensity, but some EF3 damage was noted later along the path.

One person was killed, and at least 85 injuries were reported in Cumberland County. In Fayetteville, the worst damage appeared to be located between Yadkin Road and the entrance to Fort Bragg, in the northwest part of the city, where a small area of EF3 damage was seen. The Goodyear Plant sustained heavy damage, and locations near Pine Forest High School were also very heavily damaged. Womack Army Medical Center was operating on emergency backup power after power was cut to much of Fort Bragg. With a damage path up to a mile in width, 150 houses in northwest Fayetteville were destroyed, with at least an equal number damaged.

Several houses were then destroyed between Spring Lake and Linden, as the storm grew into a large wedge tornado reported by motorists along the I-95 corridor in Harnett County. The storm, consistently generating EF2 damage, then tracked along the interstate through Dunn and just south of Benson, where television footage revealed a broad, multiple-vortex tornado structure. A Food Lion warehouse and a trailer park were severely damaged in Dunn. The tornado ultimately killed two people – one of the fatalities was in Cumberland County and the other was in Dunn in Harnett County, where a mobile home park was destroyed. There were 24 injuries in Harnett County, and 67 injuries in Johnston County.

In Johnston County, highways were blocked near Four Oaks, including I-95, for a brief period. Flying debris and minor damage were reported in Smithfield just before the tornado dissipated at 4:45 p.m. EDT (20:45 UTC), after generating a 58.5-mile (94.1 km) damage path. Damage in Johnston County reached $25 million, with 450 homes damaged, of which 287 homes were completely destroyed. The parent supercell produced additional tornadoes in Johnston and Wilson counties soon after, leaving additional damage in Micro and Wilson, tracking along I-95 much of that distance.

=== Ammon–Roseboro–Clinton, North Carolina ===
Ammon–Roseboro–Clinton, North Carolina
Meteorological history
- Formed: April 16, 2011, 4:25 p.m. EDT (UTC-05:00)
- Dissipated: April 16, 2011, 5:00 p.m. EDT (UTC-05:00)
- Duration: 35 minutes

EF2 tornado
- on the Enhanced Fujita scale
- Highest winds: 120 mph (190 km/h)

Overall effects
- Casualties: 3 fatalities, 13 injuries
- Damage: $11.25 million (2011 USD)

This strong and long tracked tornado first touched down at 4:25 p.m. EDT (20:25 UTC) in northern Bladen County southwest of Old Fayettville Road, and quickly began to cause major damage to the Foxfire Nursery. The tornado completely destroyed four large hog houses and significantly damaged two others. More than one hundred hogs were killed by the tornado. Small offices and outbuildings near the hog houses were either completely destroyed or significantly damaged. There were a couple dozen trees downed in the area. Power lines were also downed. The damage was rated EF1 with winds to 105 mph (169 km/h). The tornado moved across a wooded area and as it approached Old Fayetteville Road, it completely destroyed three manufactured homes, two singlewide trailers and a doublewide. A fourth singlewide manufactured home was broken from its foundation and turned 90 degrees on the north side of Old Fayetteville Road. All of the homes appeared to have been strapped down. There were three fatalities. Several dozen pine and hardwood trees were snapped off as were a few power poles. The damage near and along Old Fayetteville Road was rated EF2 with winds to 130 mph (210 km/h). The tornado then continued into Cumberland County, where minor damage occurred. Continuing northeast through the county, it would produce EF2 damage near Smith Road and Peters Creek road, where multiple homes were damaged, including one home that sustained major damage that was rated EF2. Four injuries occurred in this area, and hundreds of trees were downed nearby. Continuous damage had also occurred along Broadwater Road, just east of Smith Road.

The tornado then continued into Sampson County, just southwest of Roseboro. The tornado tracked along NC Highway 24, between Roseboro and Clinton Cyclic damage between EF1 and EF2 damage occurred between Bonnetsville Road and Clinton, including Bass Lake Road and Dixie Road. The tornado continued northeast, crossing Highways 421 and 701 on the north side of Clinton. A roof was completely blown off of a home on Isaac Weeks Road. As the tornado moved northeast, it began to significantly weaken, causing primarily minor damage to homes at EF1 intensity. Outbuildings also experiences minor damage, and power poles were bent or blown down. The tornado weakened and quickly lifted in the vicinity of Highway 403 and East Darden Road, with minor roof damage to a home. In total, there were 85 to 90 residential structures were damaged, with 25 destroyed;and 13 businesses damaged, with 3 destroyed.

=== Bladenboro–Elizabethtown, North Carolina ===
Bladenboro–Elizabethtown, North Carolina
Meteorological history
- Formed: April 16, 2011, 4:58 p.m. EDT (UTC-05:00)
- Dissipated: April 16, 2011, 5:18 p.m. EDT (UTC-05:00)
- Duration: 20 minutes

EF2 tornado
- on the Enhanced Fujita scale
- Highest winds: 120 mph (190 km/h)

Overall effects
- Casualties: 1 fatality
- Damage: $3.10 million (2011 USD)

This strong tornado tracked 13 miles (21 km) across Bladen County. The tornado was rated EF2 with winds up to 120 miles per hour (190 km/h), and had a maximum width of 440 yards (400 m)

The tornado first touched down at 4:58 p.m. EDT (UTC-05:00) in downtown Bladenboro at the intersection of Seaboard Street and Highway 242. A gas station had its asphalt roof completely torn away and tossed into the aluminum awning over the pumps, damaging the awning. A small industrial building also had its asphalt roof entirely removed and tossed 30 yards (27 m) downwind. The tornado then came entirely to the ground decimating a grove of about 75 trees, consisting of maple and oak, some up to 2 feet (0.61 m) in diameter. The path width at this point was approximately 150 yards (140 m). The damage was rated EF1 with winds up to 100 mph (160 km/h). The tornado tracked along and west of Highway 242, causing damage to single wide mobile home. Of these homes, one un-mounted home was flipped onto its side, a second was partially destroyed, while a third had its entire metal roof ripped off and tossed up into a tree. Just beyond these homes the Bladenboro EMS building was also damaged. Partial uplift of the roof of this brick building was noted, as well as the complete destruction of a small shed. Many large hardwood trees were also uprooted. The damage here was rated EF1 with winds up to 100 mph (160 km/h). The tornado then widened to 200 yards (180 m) as it moved across a neighborhood of mobile homes in the Ronald Britt Road area. Almost all trees in this area, with many being oak trees, were snapped. Many homes sustained minor damage, however three of them were completely destroyed, with the remaining debris deposited well downwind from where the home originally stood. One fatality occurred in this area. Damage in this neighborhood was rated up EF2 with winds estimated up to 120 mph (190 km/h). The tornado then widened further as it moved adjacent to Highway 242. Near Bill Crawley Road around 5:08 p.m. EDT, a single wide mobile home was completely demolished and its debris was spread 50 yards (46 m) to the other side of Highway 242. Up to 80% of trees were snapped or uprooted in this area.

The tornado then crossed back across Highway 242 and reached its maximum width of 440 yards (400 m) as it crossed Guyton Road and encountered a series of single family homes. A large brick home had approximately half of its roof destroyed and ripped away, while other surrounding homes sustained cosmetic damage. Additionally, a few empty galvanized steel grain silos were picked up and tossed 100 yards (91 m) from its original location. This damage was rated EF2 with winds up to 120 mph (190 km/h). The tornado continued northeast through primarily forested areas before impacting the Hayfield neighborhood of Elizabethtown around 5:12 p.m. p.m.EDT Extensive damage occurred between Singletary Avenue and Doll Street. A well built home had its roof partially lifted, resulting in additional damage to exterior walls. Many other homes in this neighborhood also sustained cosmetic damage. The tornado began to weaken and shrink as it moved across Cromartie Road. Most trees in this area were snapped and/or uprooted. The tornado then crossed Highway 87 and made a direct strike on The Elizabethtown Baptist Church. Moderate roof damage was noted to the church as well as several other buildings in the path of the tornado. A brick covered walkway was almost completely leveled. The tornado continued through primarily forested areas, before crossing Highway 53, where it tore down several trees at EF1 intensity, before dissipating at 5:18 p.m. EDT.

=== Askewville–Bertie County, North Carolina ===
Askewville/Bertie County, North Carolina
- The tornado as seen tracking near Askewville.

Meteorological history
- Formed: April 16, 2011, 6:55 p.m. EDT (UTC–05:00)
- Dissipated: April 16, 2011, 7:10 p.m. EDT (UTC–05:00)
- Duration: 15 minutes

EF3 tornado
- on the Enhanced Fujita scale
- Highest winds: 140 mph (230 km/h)

Overall effects
- Casualties: 12 fatalities, 58 injuries
- Damage: $4.45 million (2011 USD)

At 6:55 p.m. EDT (22:55 UTC) on April 16, a strong tornado touched down one mile south of Askewville, North Carolina. The tornado traveled to the northeast on a 17.88-mile (28.78 km) long path, and grew up to ½-¾ miles wide at times, before lifting approximately three miles east of Harrellsville, North Carolina.

Bertie County emergency officials reported widespread catastrophic damage in the Askewville area, as 67 homes and 37 mobile homes were destroyed, with some homes ripped off their foundations. One business was also destroyed, and 19 other structures sustained lesser damage. There had also been some damage done to emergency vehicles as officials tried to clear the roadways in the damage path. The tornado destroyed seven mobile homes at Jake's Trailer Park, located off of Askewville Road, injuring two people. This long-track tornado was the deadliest of the entire outbreak, killing 11 people (including a family of three and another couple) when the tornado hit areas a couple miles west of Colerain, and injuring 58 other people along its entire path. On April 20, one of the injured people died at Pitt Memorial Hospital, increasing the death toll from the tornado to 12. The tornado moved into Hertford County, damaging and destroying many more homes before dissipating at 7:10 p.m. EDT (23:10 UTC). Another tornado touched down northwest of Colerain and tracked parallel to this tornado; it was rated EF2.

Bertie County was also struck by two tornadoes, an F2 and F3, in the 1984 Carolinas tornado outbreak, and on April 19, 1943, an F3 tornado destroyed every building in the town of Roxobel, in the western part of the county.

== Non-tornadic events ==
=== Blizzard ===
A late-season blizzard with high winds and moderate to heavy snow—up to 16 inches (40 cm)—occurred on the back side of the main low pressure area, particularly across western Kansas and Nebraska and parts of South Dakota. Several major highways, including I-70 and I-80, were closed as a result, and travelers were stranded in numerous communities. Heavy snow and isolated freezing rain was also reported across parts of the Upper Midwest, particularly in Minnesota and western Wisconsin.

=== Straight-line winds ===
In the Northeastern United States, there were very high winds, sometimes gusting upwards of 70 mph (110 km/h), associated with the storms that were active on April 16, especially in northern New York state.

== Aftermath ==
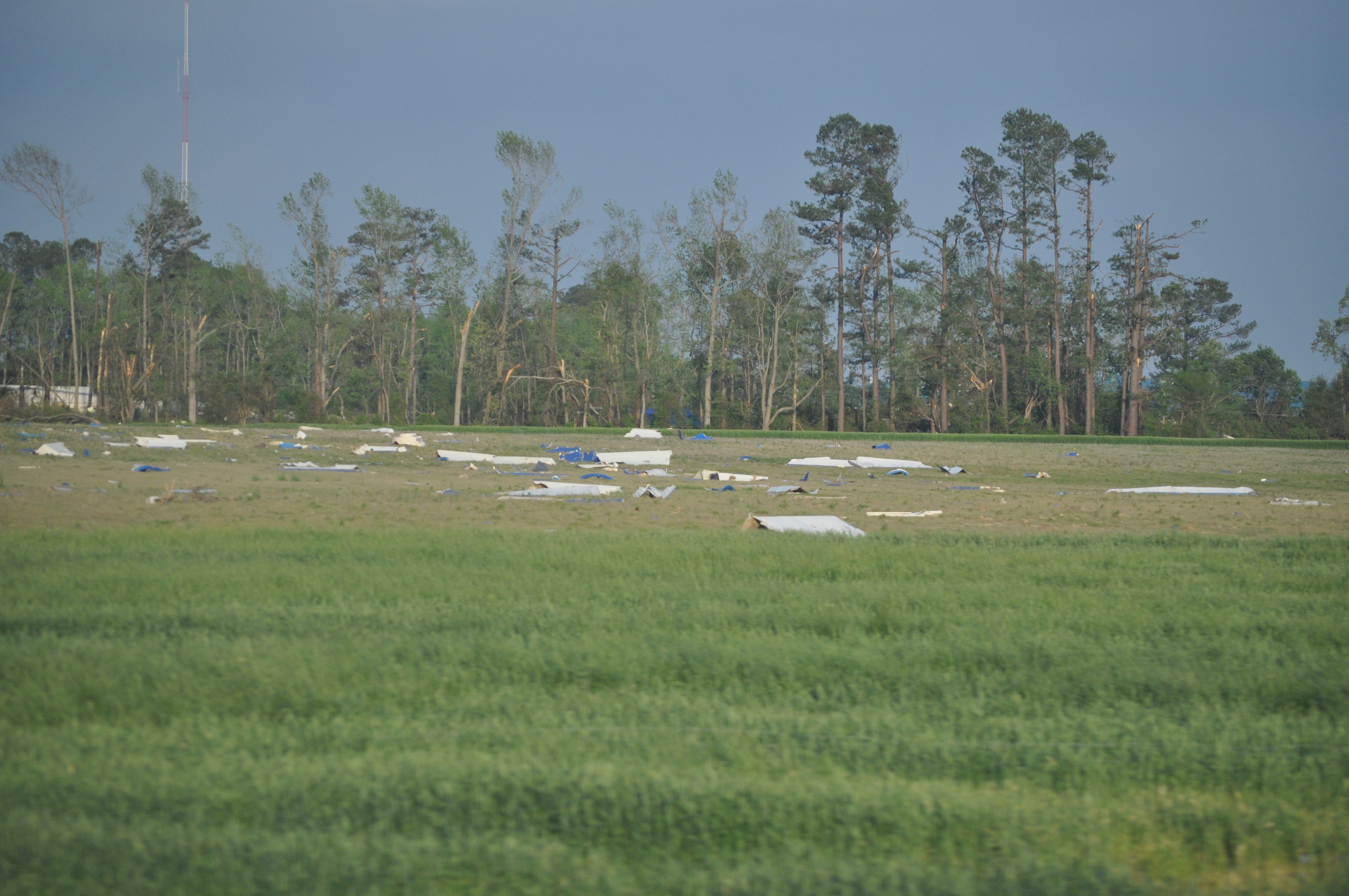
Debris strewn across a field near Dunn, NC

After the outbreak was over, many communities were left devastated, with severe destruction and no electricity. Several major cities were impacted by the outbreak, such as Raleigh, Little Rock, and Jackson. In the wake of the destruction as a result of the storms and tornadoes Alabama governor Robert J. Bentley declared a state of emergency for the entire state. North Carolina governor Bev Perdue did likewise as a result. 26 counties in Oklahoma and 14 counties in Mississippi were also placed under a state of emergency. In total, the tornadoes killed 38 people, injured many more, and caused at least 600 million dollars in damage.

Aftermath of the April 16, 2011 tornado outbreak in Snow Hill, Greene County, North Carolina

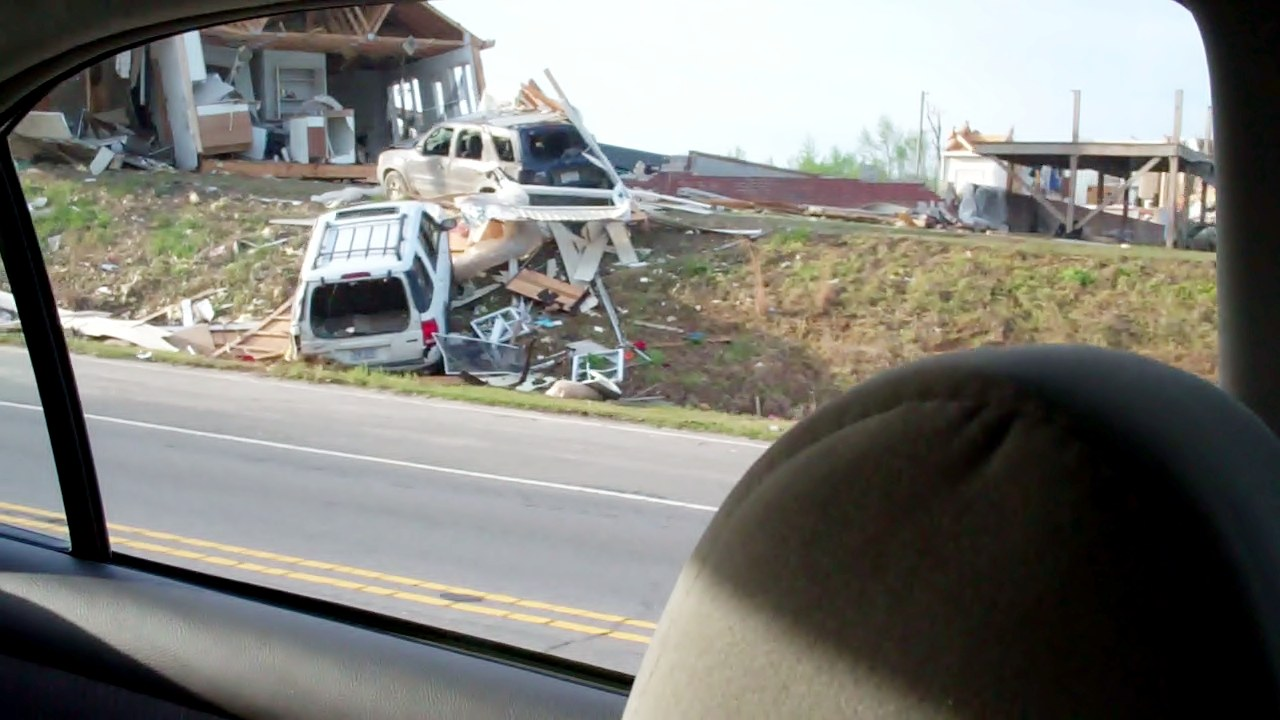
Destroyed homes and cars along Highway 13 in Snow Hill, NC.

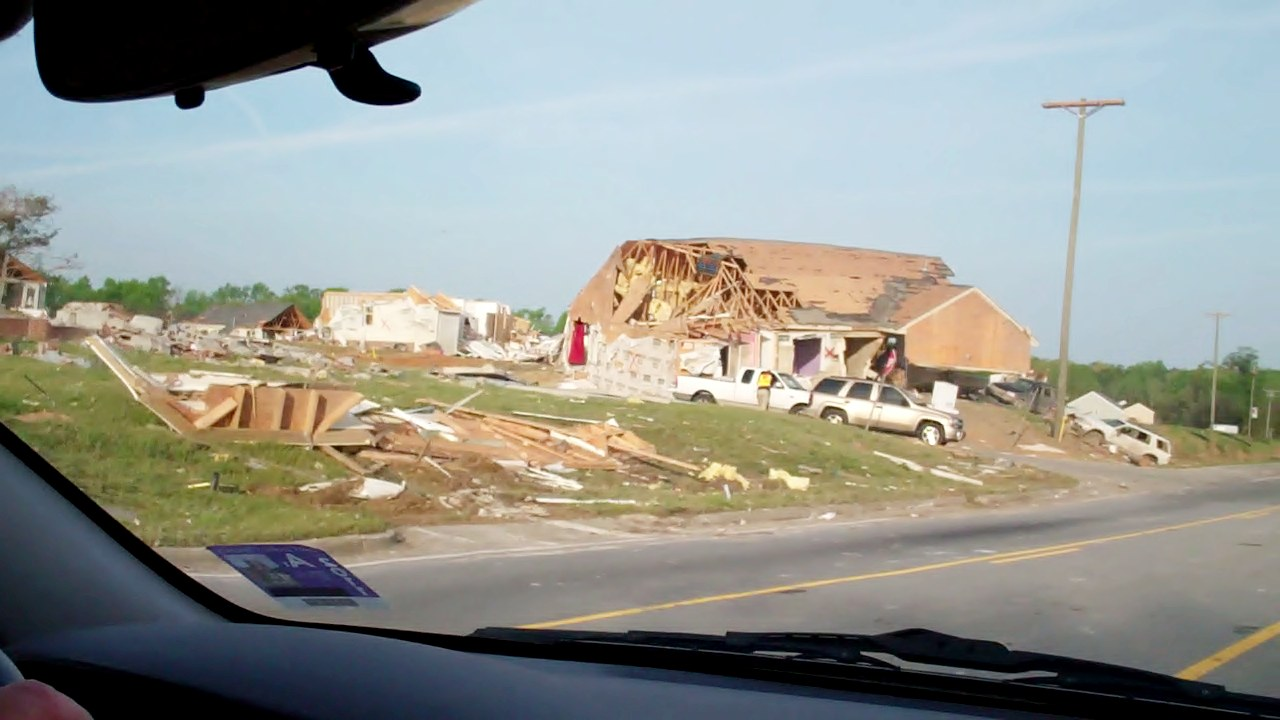
Destroyed homes and cars along Highway 13 in Snow Hill, NC.

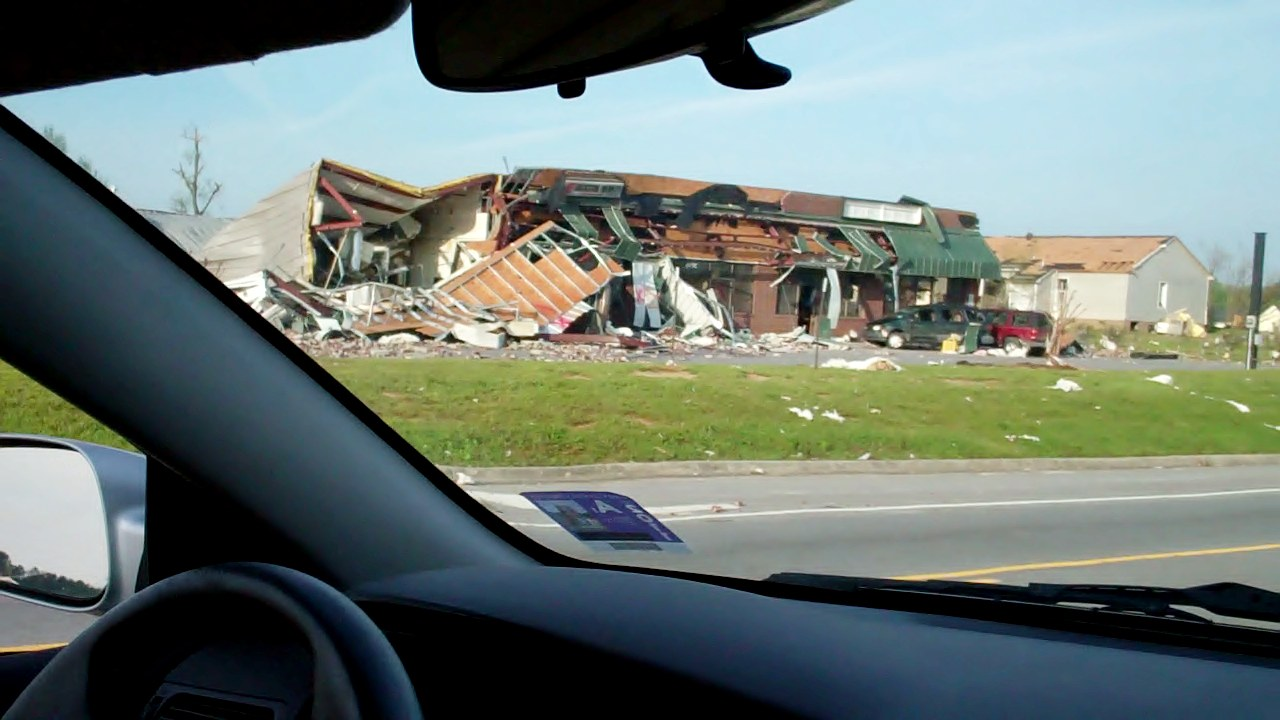
Destroyed businesses along Highway 13 in Snow Hill, NC.

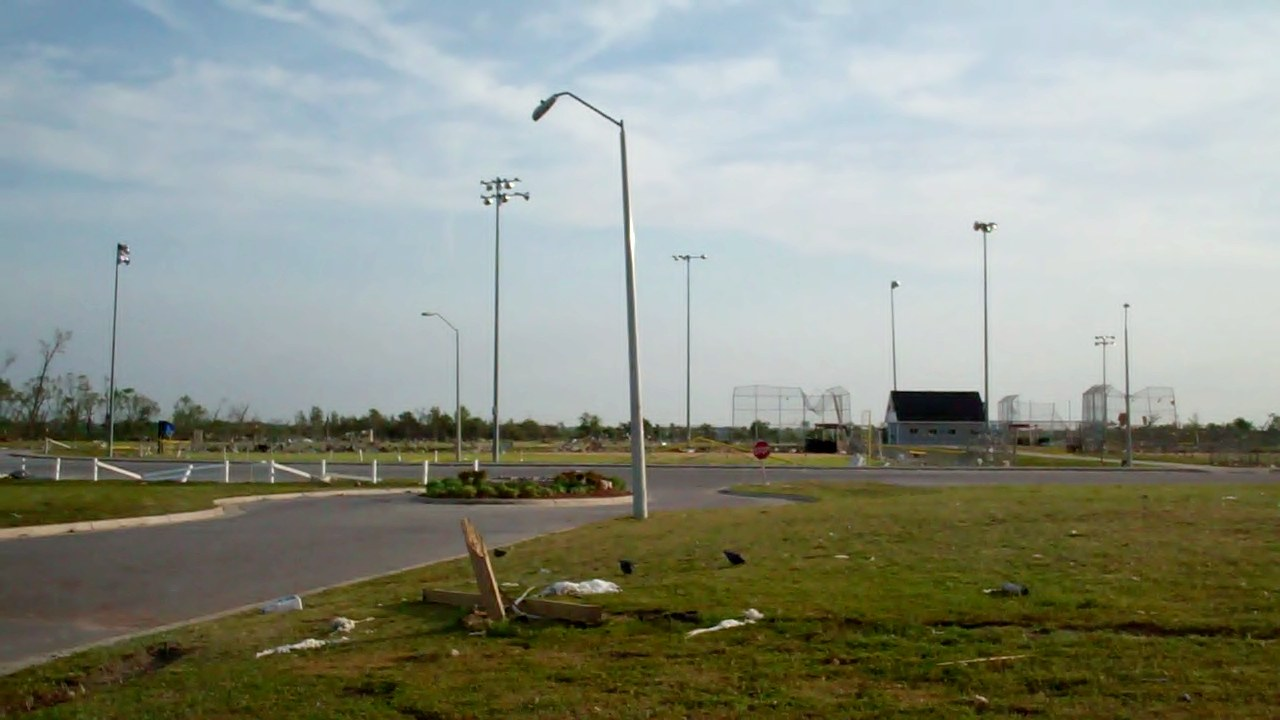
Damaged athletic complex along Highway 13 in Snow Hill, NC.

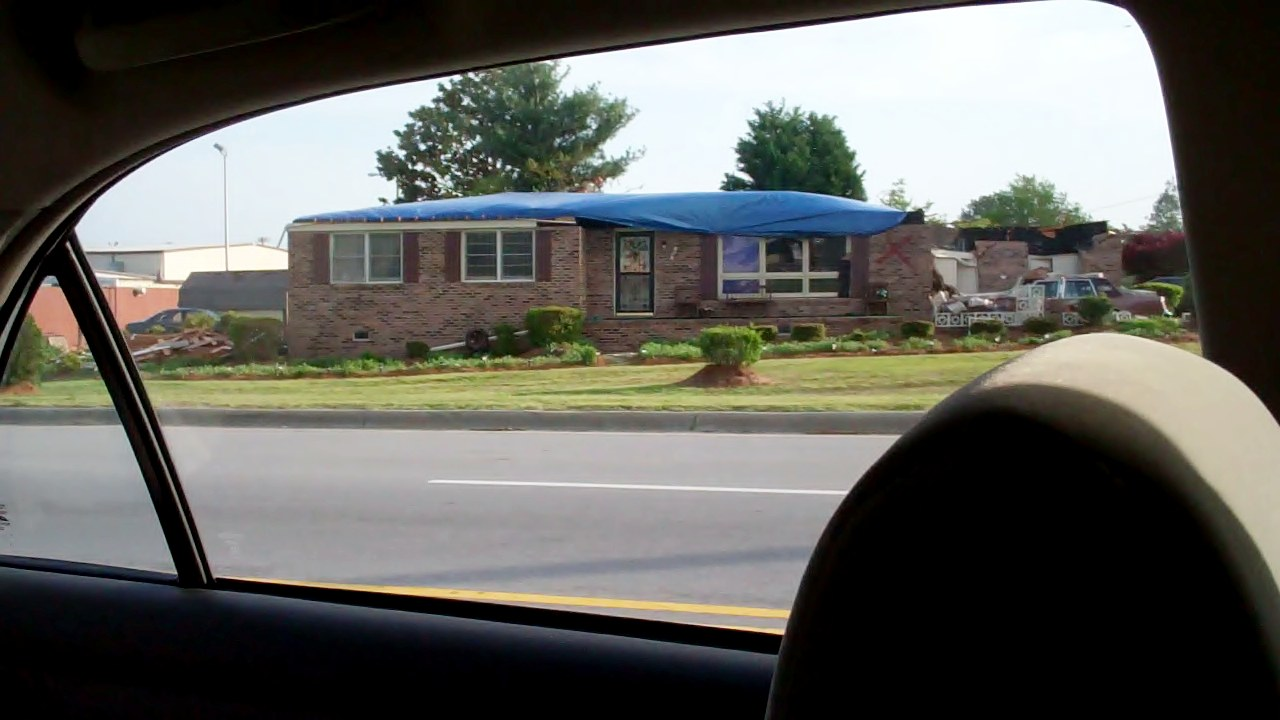
Destroyed home along Highway 13 in Snow Hill, NC.

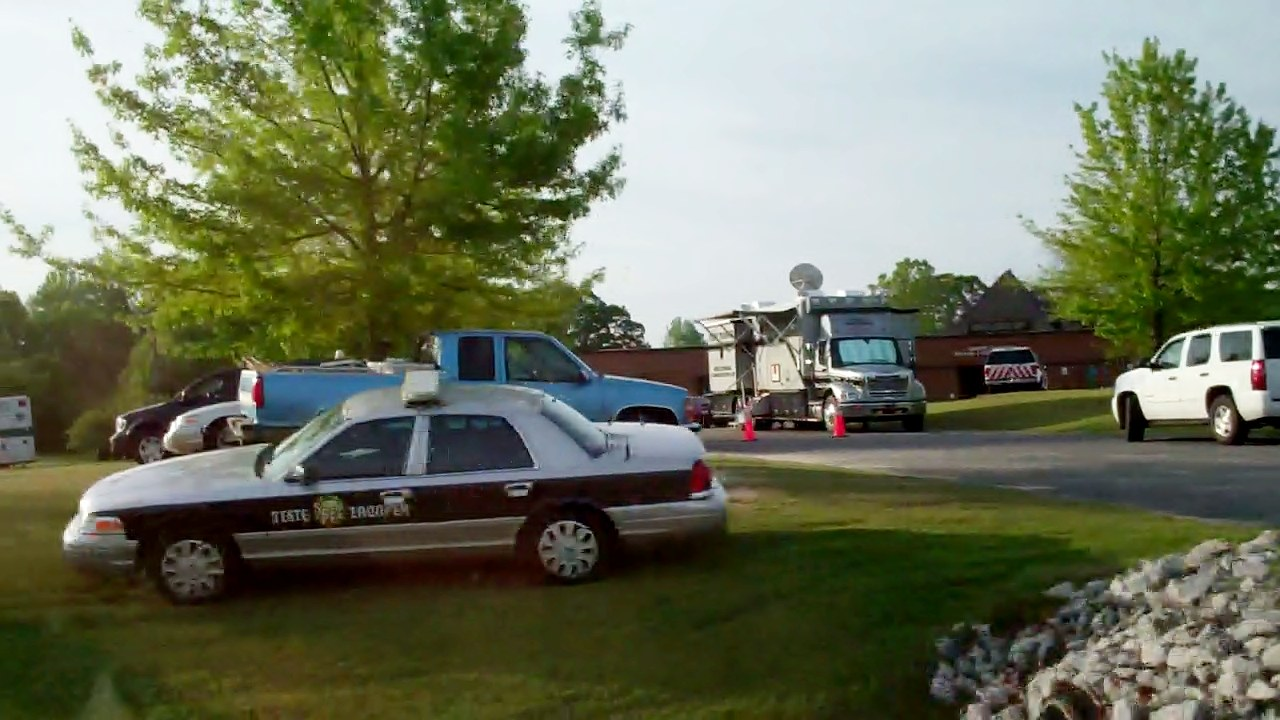
Emergency Response Headquarters at Greene County Government Complex along Highway 13 in Snow Hill, NC.

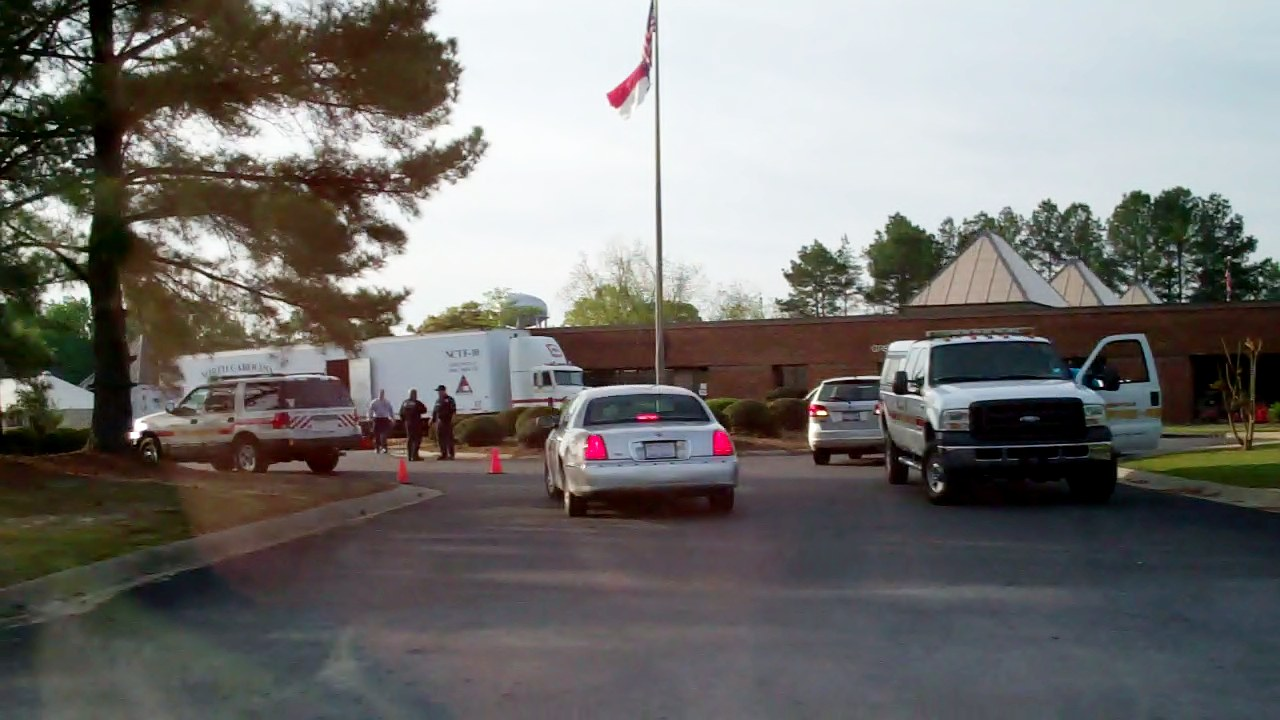
Emergency Response Headquarters at Greene County Government Complex along Highway 13 in Snow Hill, NC.

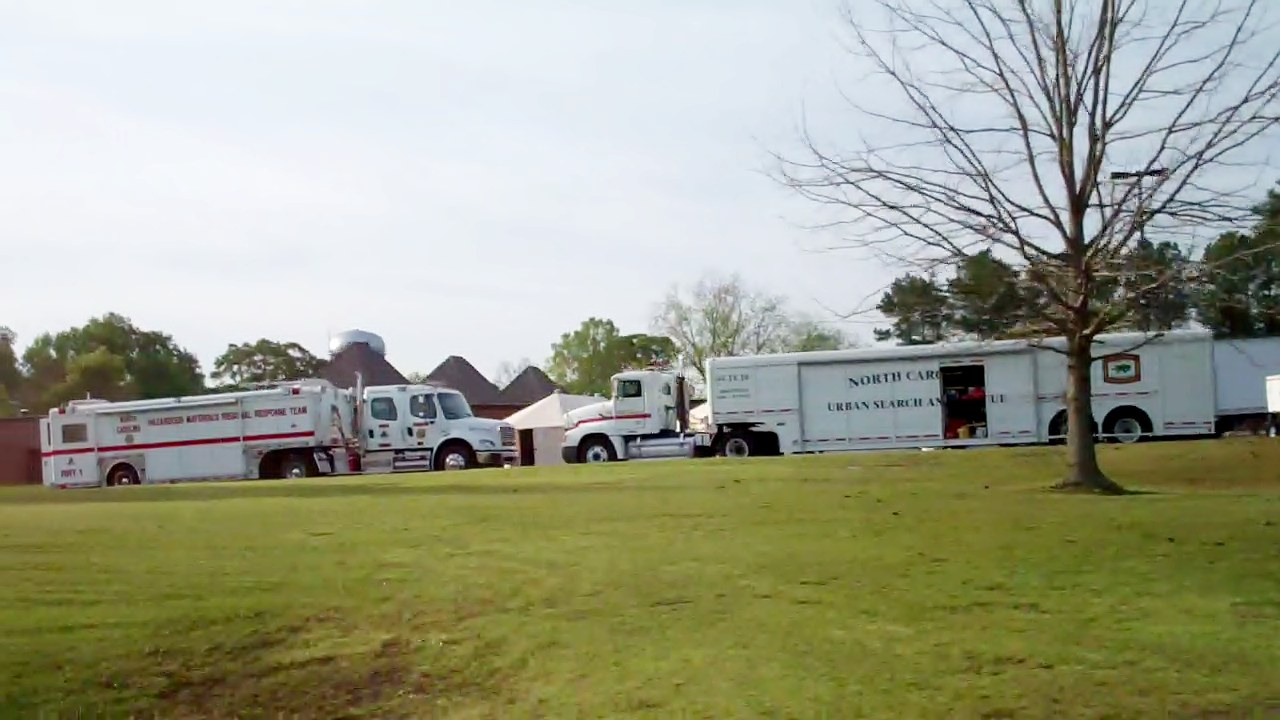
Emergency Response Headquarters at Greene County Government Complex along Highway 13 in Snow Hill, NC.

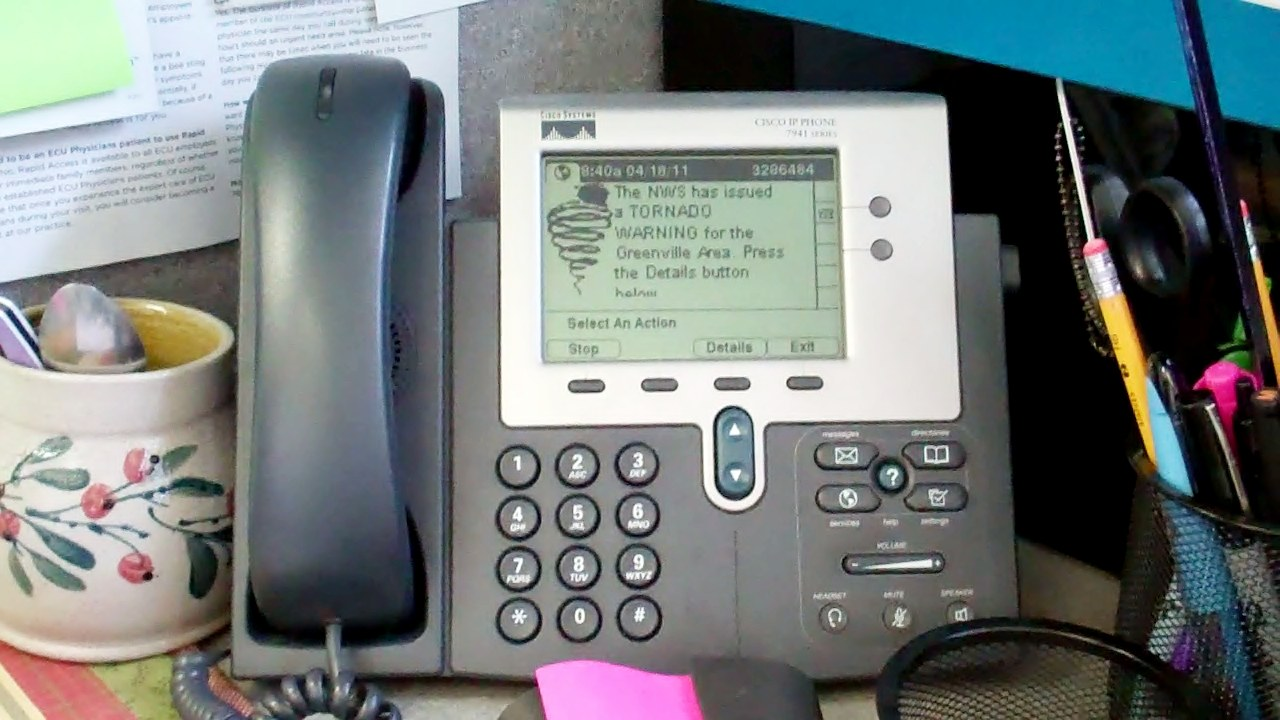
A voice over IP (VOIP) office phone at East Carolina University in Pitt County displays multiple tornado warnings from April 16th.

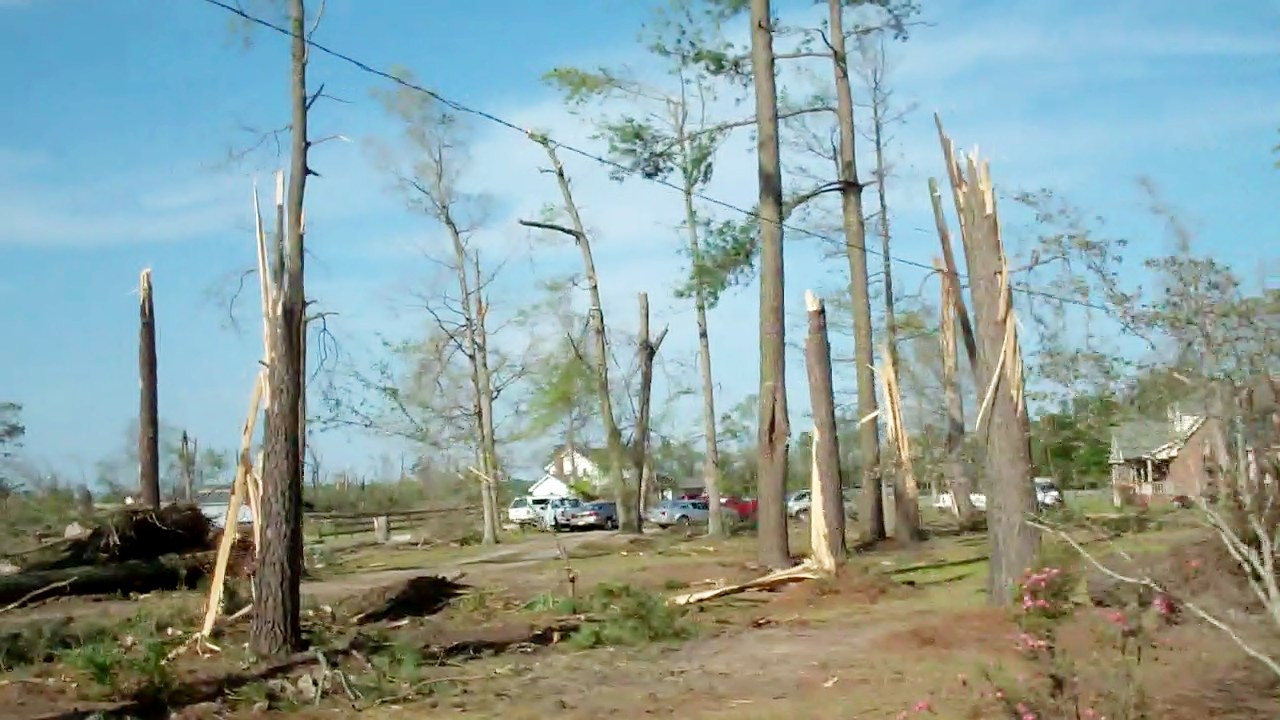
Pine trees snapped in half in Snow Hill, NC.

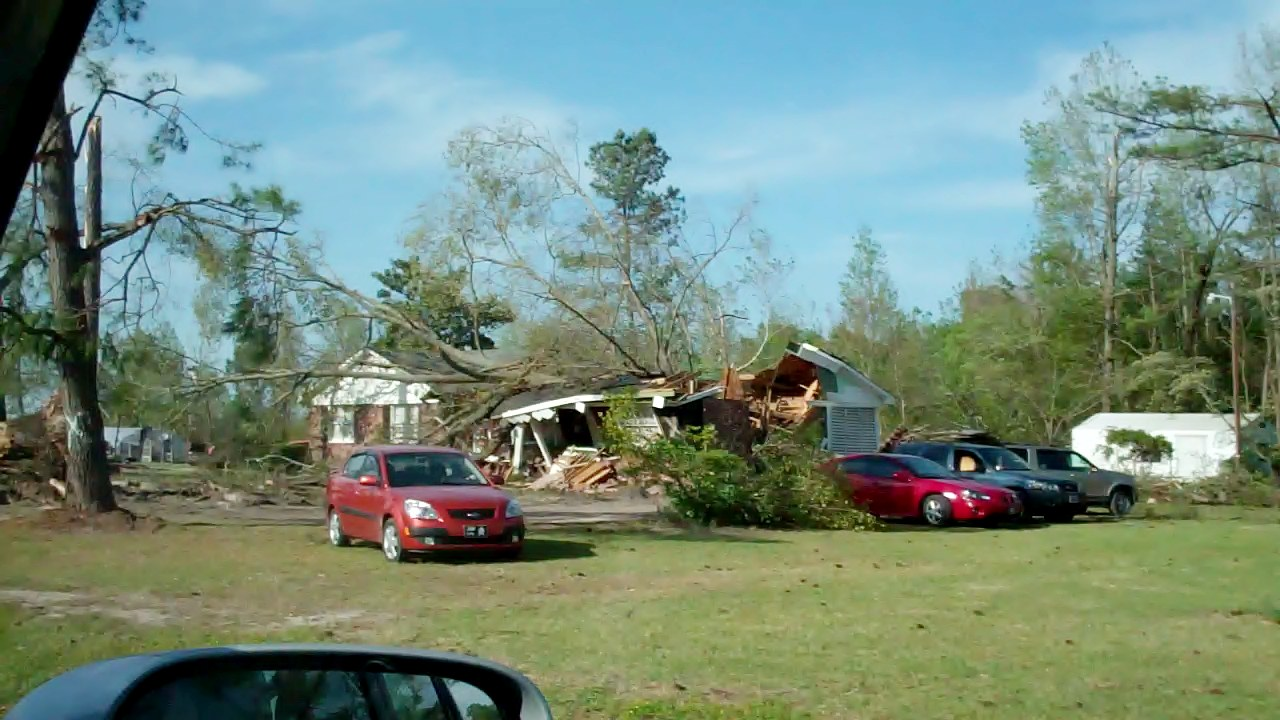
Damaged homes and debris cleanup in Snow Hill, NC.

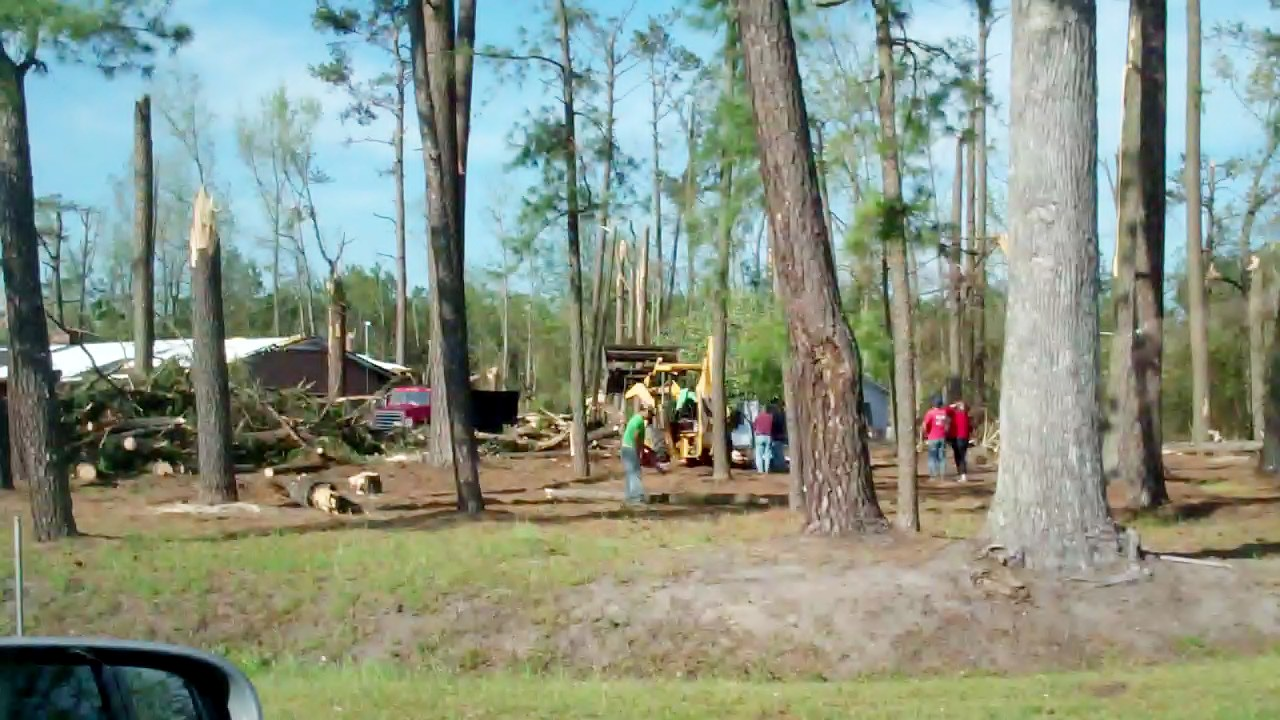
Damaged homes, pine trees snapped in half, and debris cleanup in Snow Hill, NC.

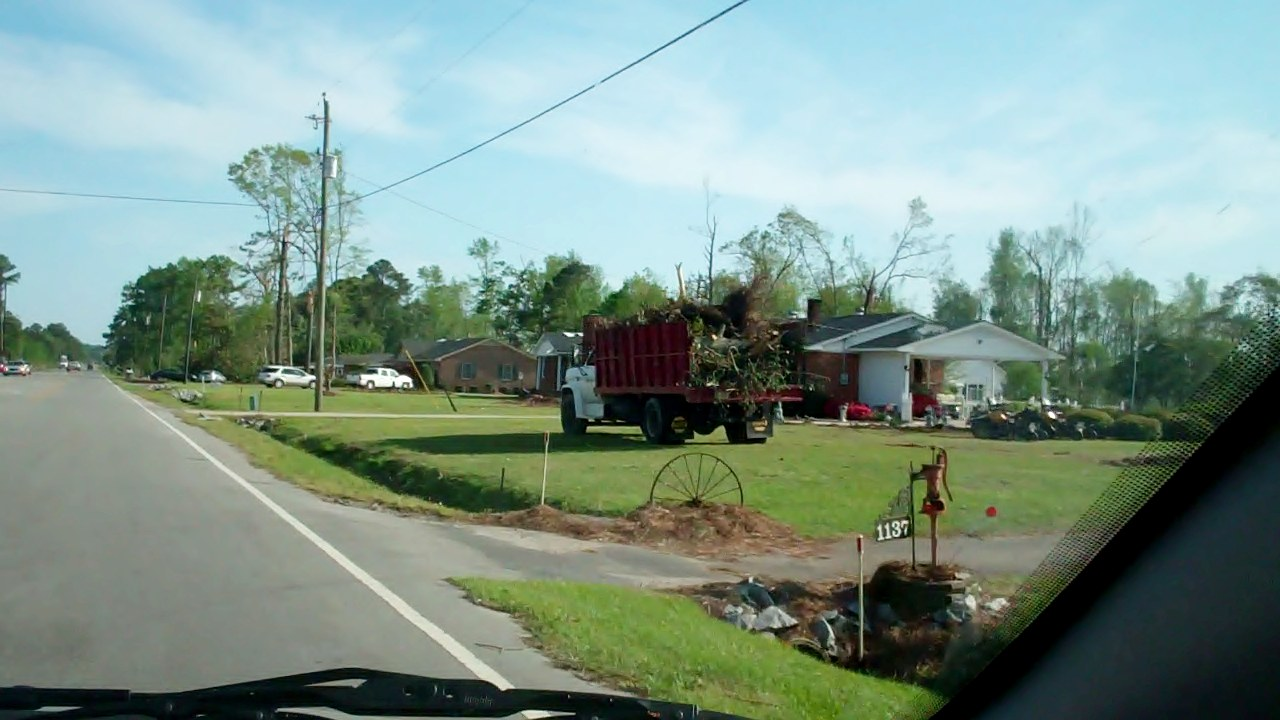
Storm debris cleanup in Snow Hill, NC.

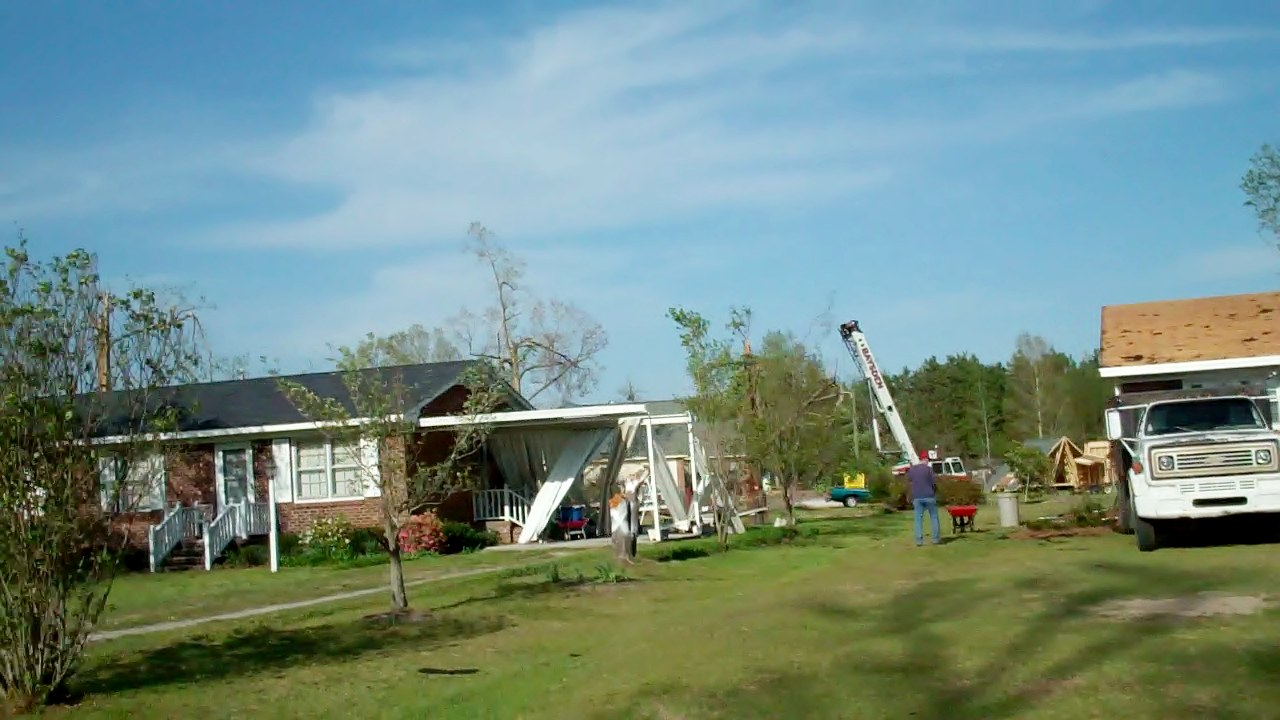
Damaged homes and debris cleanup in Snow Hill, NC.

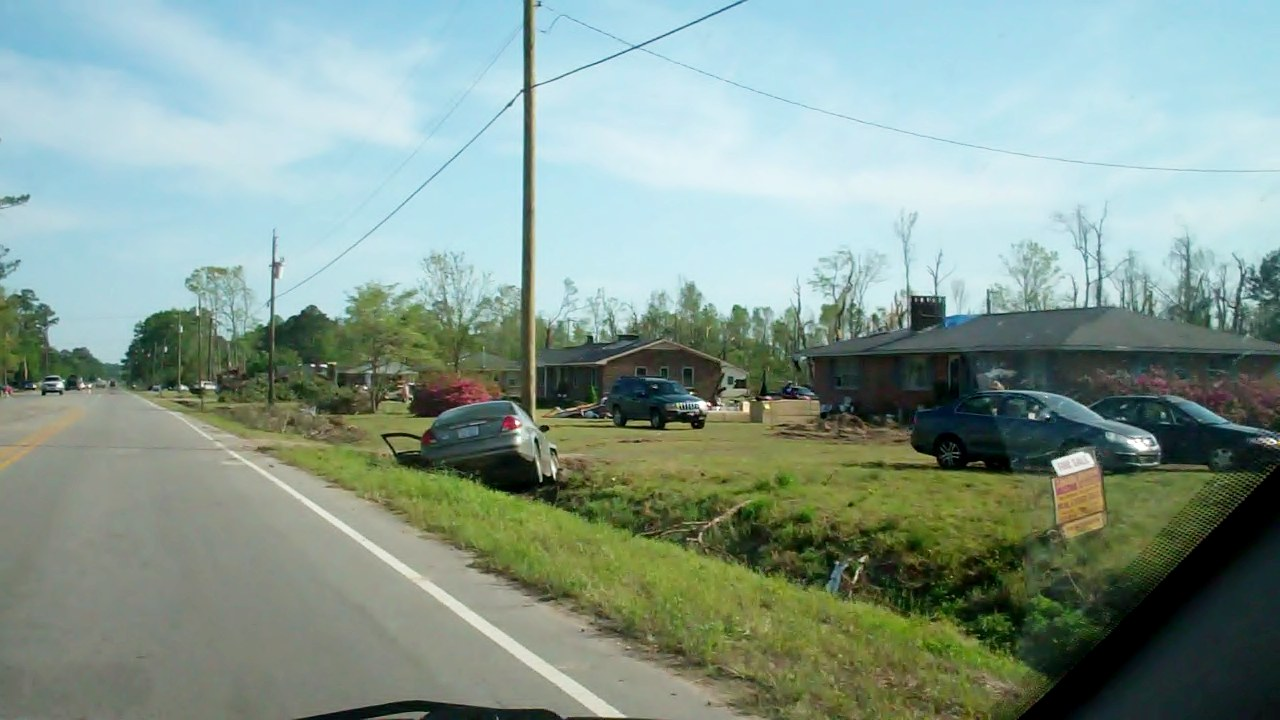
A car thrown into a ditch and storm debris cleanup in Snow Hill, NC.

=== Historical comparisons ===
The outbreak was the deadliest tornadic event in the United States since the Super Tuesday tornado outbreak that occurred on February 5 and 6, 2008, when 57 people were killed across four states. In North Carolina, the outbreak was the state's deadliest since March 1984, and the largest in state history. Describing the outbreak, AccuWeather meteorologist Henry Margusity said, "There has not been a tornado outbreak in history over three days with this many tornadoes spawned by a single storm system". That record would later be smashed by the 2011 Super Outbreak that occurred just over a week after this outbreak.

Tornado events of this magnitude are rare in North Carolina, with outbreaks on February 19, 1884 and March 28, 1984 the only historical precedents for outbreaks of this size, scale, and level of overall widespread damage. A March 31, 1973, outbreak produced over 25 tornadoes in the state, but all but one of those storms produced only F0 or F1 damage. The May 1989 tornado outbreak produced fewer, but more intense storms. More recently, an outbreak on May 17, 1998, produced 18 tornadoes in the state, including one F4 and one F3, but other storms in that outbreak were much weaker and short-lived.

== See also ==
- List of North American tornadoes and tornado outbreaks
- List of tornadoes striking downtown areas
