= Garrett White House =

Historic house in North Carolina, United States

- Garrett-White House
- U.S. National Register of Historic Places
- Location within North Carolina Location within the United States
- Nearest city: Colerain, North Carolina
- Coordinates: 36°12′44.95″N 76°52′58.11″W
- Built: 1780 or 1785
- Architectural style: Early Republic
- NRHP reference No.: 82003425
- Added to NRHP: June 28, 1982

The Garrett White House, sometimes referred to as the Garrett-White House, is a historic structure in Colerain, Bertie County, North Carolina. The house is listed in the National Register of Historic Places as constructed in 1785, though some other sources give the date of construction as 1780.

== Description and history ==
The Garrett White House is a late Georgian house, near the community of Trap in Bertie County, North Carolina, about six miles (10 km) west of the Chowan River, shortly before it becomes the Albemarle Sound. The late-Georgian architecture is "relatively rare in Bertie County, where Federal and Greek Revival period buildings predominated." The plantation house was built originally on the hall and parlor plan. It was remodelled less than twenty years later, when the Hope Mansion was built and the Federal style became fashionable in the Albemarle region. Most of the earlier woodwork and chimney pieces were reused, but the house was given the central hall plan it has today. The house retains all of its original woodwork and some of its plaster. The pier structure has been retained, so the massive sill timbering is easily viewed.

The house was built by Jesse Garrett, a farmer and slave owner. Much of the interior of the house is fabricated from first growth pine, and it is possible that the artisans who crafted the woodwork and panelling were from the enslaved community.

Jesse Garrett was born in 1725 on the east side of the Chowan River. He later moved to the west side, became a flourishing landowner and built a "manor house." He farmed the acres around the community now known as Trap, and also owned a grist mill on Barbeque Swamp, about half a mile west of the present site of the house. In addition to the twenty enslaved African Americans he owned, he also had a family of ten living in the house.

The Census and Court records affirm that for 200 years the house was lived in by only two families, the Garretts and the Whites. After Jacob Hill White bought the property in 1849 he gave 1-acre (4,000 m^{2}) of his land to the trustees of the Church of Christ at Philadelphia, a small congregation in the community of Trap. The church was renamed the Mars Hill Baptist Church, and the surrounding community, now often referred to as Mars Hill, became a center of education, founding the Mars Hill High School.

During the Civil War the house is identified as belonging to "Mrs. White." This could either be Jacob's wife, or Elizabeth White, perhaps his mother, a wealthy woman listed as living in the household in 1850. She would have been 83 when the map which identifies the house was drawn. Elizabeth White is listed as having personal property – probably enslaved workers – valued at $9,000.

After the death of the last White family occupant, the house was sold, but it was unoccupied until it was bought by Preservation North Carolina and resold under covenants to the present owners in 1996. A program of restoration was begun, which is largely complete. The original chimney pieces, which had previously been removed from the house without the consent of any of the owners, were recovered by Preservation North Carolina and have been reinstalled. The early 19th century porch/piazza has been rebuilt using the mortise and tenon joints uncovered during restoration.
