= John Newell =

John Newell may refer to:

- John Newell (baseball) (1868–1919), Major League Baseball infielder
- John Newell (Canadian politician) (born 1935), member of the Nova Scotia House of Assembly
- John Newell (North Carolina politician), state legislator in North Carolina
- John Newell (Queensland politician) (1849–1932), member of the Queensland Legislative Assembly
