= Snakebite (disambiguation) =

A Snakebite is an injury caused by the bite of a snake.

Snakebite or snake bite may also refer to:

== Music ==
- Snakebite, a German band that featured Doro
- Snakebite (album), a 1978 album by Whitesnake
- "Snakebite," a song from Alice Cooper's album Hey Stoopid
- "Snakebite," a song from Big D and the Kids Table's album Strictly Rude
- "Snakebite," a song from Judas Priest's album Redeemer of Souls

== Other ==
- Snakebite (drink), an alcoholic beverage made with beer and cider
- Snake Bite (truck), a monster truck
- Snakebite Township, Bertie County, North Carolina, a former municipality in the United States
- Peter Wright (darts player), darts player nicknamed Snakebite
- Snake bites, a type of lip piercing, or any two body piercings placed side by side
- Young Sherlock Holmes: Snake Bite, a novel written by Andy Lane
- Indian burn (prank), an abusive prank where the prankster twists another persons forearm/wrist
