= Powellsville, North Carolina =

- Town
- Seal
- Nickname: Zoo
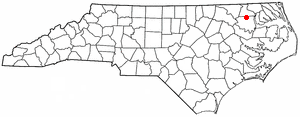
- Location of Powellsville, North Carolina
- Coordinates: 36°13′31″N 76°55′54″W
- Country: United States
- State: North Carolina
- County: Bertie

Area
  - Total: 0.36 sq mi (0.92 km^{2})
  - Land: 0.36 sq mi (0.92 km^{2})
  - Water: 0 sq mi (0.00 km^{2})
- Elevation: 66 ft (20 m)

Population (2020)
  - Total: 189
  - Density: 529.9/sq mi (204.59/km^{2})
- Time zone: UTC-5 (Eastern (EST))
  - Summer (DST): UTC-4 (EDT)
- ZIP code: 27967
- Area code: 252
- FIPS code: 37-53680
- GNIS feature ID: 2407155

Powellsville is a town in Bertie County, North Carolina, United States. As of the 2020 census, Powellsville had a population of 189. The town is home to Travis Bond (NFL lineman)

== Geography ==
According to the United States Census Bureau, the town has a total area of 0.35 square miles (0.9 km^{2}), all land.

== Demographics ==
Historical population
Census	Pop.	Note	%±
1900	44		—
1910	75		70.5%
1920	157		109.3%
1930	194		23.6%
1940	267		37.6%
1950	250		−6.4%
1960	259		3.6%
1970	247		−4.6%
1980	320		29.6%
1990	103		−67.8%
2000	259		151.5%
2010	276		6.6%
2020	189		−31.5%
U.S. Decennial Census

=== Racial and ethnic composition ===
Powellsville town, North Carolina – Racial and ethnic composition Note: the US Census treats Hispanic/Latino as an ethnic category. This table excludes Latinos from the racial categories and assigns them to a separate category. Hispanics/Latinos may be of any race.
Race / Ethnicity (NH = Non-Hispanic)	Pop 2000	Pop 2010	Pop 2020	% 2000	% 2010	% 2020
White alone (NH)	132	99	61	50.97%	35.87%	32.28%
Black or African American alone (NH)	120	164	116	46.33%	59.42%	61.38%
Native American or Alaska Native alone (NH)	3	3	2	1.16%	1.09%	1.06%
Asian alone (NH)	0	0	0	0.00%	0.00%	0.00%
Native Hawaiian or Pacific Islander alone (NH)	0	0	0	0.00%	0.00%	0.00%
Other race alone (NH)	0	0	2	0.00%	0.00%	1.06%
Mixed race or Multiracial (NH)	2	0	0	0.77%	0.00%	0.00%
Hispanic or Latino (any race)	2	10	8	0.77%	3.62%	4.23%
Total	259	276	189	100.00%	100.00%	100.00%

=== 2000 census ===
As of the census of 2000, there were 259 people, 122 households, and 71 families residing in the town. The population density was 717.9 inhabitants per square mile (277.2/km^{2}). There were 136 housing units at an average density of 377.0 per square mile (145.6/km^{2}). The racial makeup of the town was 50.97% White, 46.72% African American, 1.16% Native American, 0.39% from other races, and 0.77% from two or more races. Hispanic or Latino of any race were 0.77% of the population.

There were 122 households, out of which 17.2% had children under the age of 18 living with them, 42.6% were married couples living together, 12.3% had a female householder with no husband present, and 41.0% were non-families. 36.9% of all households were made up of individuals, and 16.4% had someone living alone who was 65 years of age or older. The average household size was 2.12 and the average family size was 2.69.

In the town, the population was spread out, with 19.7% under the age of 18, 6.9% from 18 to 24, 21.6% from 25 to 44, 30.1% from 45 to 64, and 21.6% who were 65 years of age or older. The median age was 46 years. For every 100 females, there were 91.9 males. For every 100 females age 18 and over, there were 82.5 males.

The median income for a household in the town was $18,250, and the median income for a family was $30,938. Males had a median income of $33,750 versus $15,179 for females. The per capita income for the town was $14,065. About 27.5% of families and 24.3% of the population were below the poverty line, including 32.7% of those under the age of eighteen and 33.3% of those 65 or over.
