= Turner Speller =

American state legislator in North Carolina

Turner R. Speller was an American politician from Windsor, North Carolina, who was a state legislator in North Carolina. He was African American. He represented Bertie County in the North Carolina House of Representatives in 1883.

He was a trustee for a seminary at Plymouth in East Carolina.

== See also ==
- African American officeholders from the end of the Civil War until before 1900
