= Colerain, North Carolina =

- Town
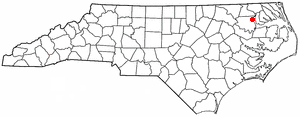
- Location of Colerain, North Carolina
- Coordinates: 36°12′06″N 76°45′59″W
- Country: United States
- State: North Carolina
- County: Bertie

Government
  - Mayor: Thomas Waicul

Area
  - Total: 0.26 sq mi (0.68 km^{2})
  - Land: 0.26 sq mi (0.68 km^{2})
  - Water: 0 sq mi (0.00 km^{2})
- Elevation: 56 ft (17 m)

Population (2020)
  - Total: 217
  - Density: 825.5/sq mi (318.71/km^{2})
- Time zone: UTC-5 (Eastern (EST))
  - Summer (DST): UTC-4 (EDT)
- ZIP code: 27924
- Area code: 252
- FIPS code: 37-13560
- GNIS feature ID: 2406293

Colerain is a town in Bertie County, North Carolina, United States. As of the 2020 census, Colerain had a population of 217.

== Etymology and history ==
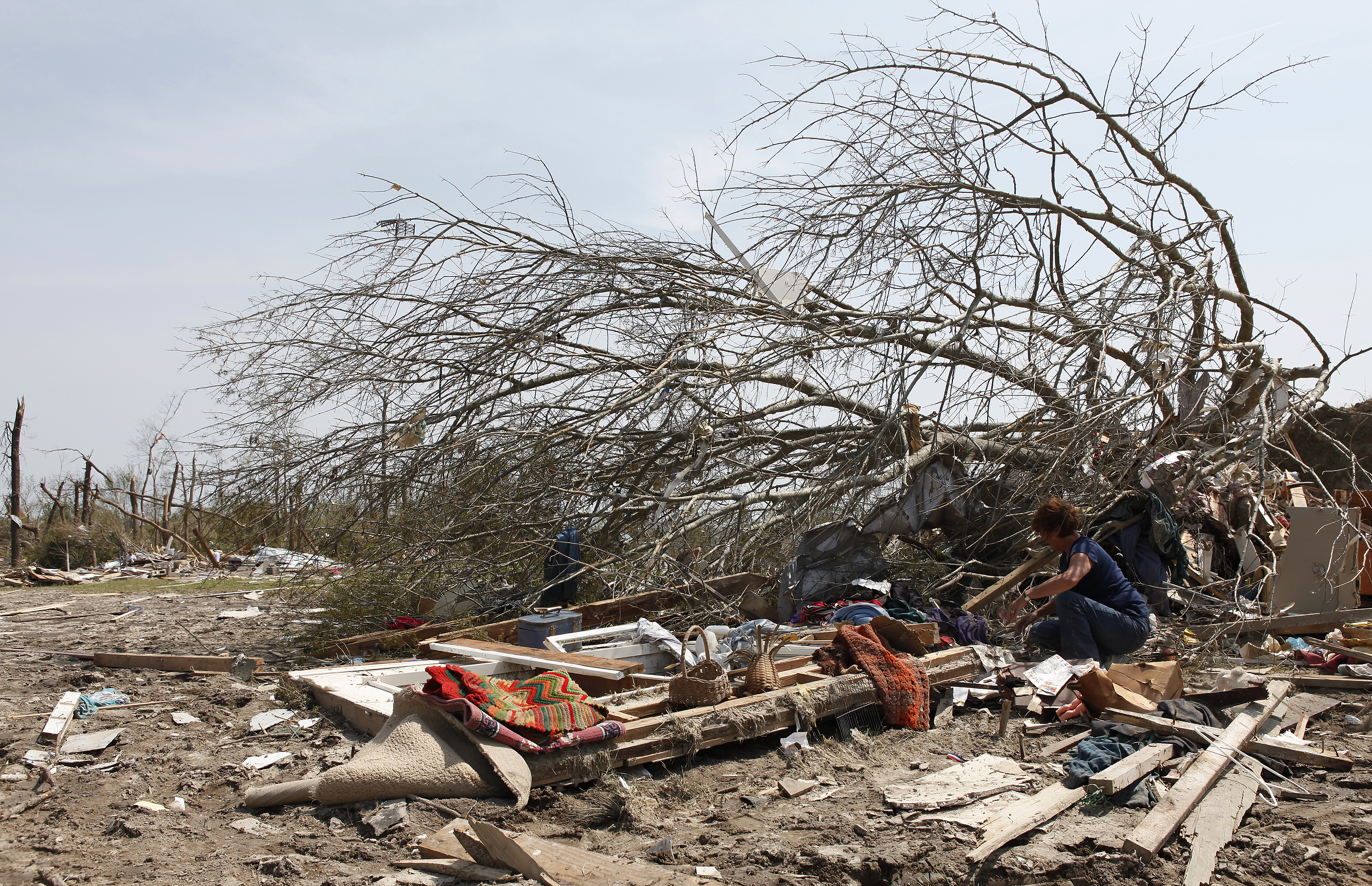
Damage by the 2011 tornado

Colerain, North Carolina, was named after Coleraine in Ireland.

On April 16, 2011, the western side of the town was hit by an EF3 tornado that killed 12 people and caused extensive damage.

The Garrett-White House was added to the National Register of Historic Places in 1982.

== Geography ==
According to the United States Census Bureau, the town has a total area of 0.27 square miles (0.7 km^{2}), all land.

== Demographics ==
Historical population
Census	Pop.	Note	%±
1880	94		—
1910	169		—
1920	215		27.2%
1930	229		6.5%
1940	307		34.1%
1950	367		19.5%
1960	340		−7.4%
1970	373		9.7%
1980	284		−23.9%
1990	139		−51.1%
2000	221		59.0%
2010	204		−7.7%
2020	217		6.4%
U.S. Decennial Census

=== Racial and ethnic composition ===
Colerain town, North Carolina – Racial and ethnic composition Note: the US Census treats Hispanic/Latino as an ethnic category. This table excludes Latinos from the racial categories and assigns them to a separate category. Hispanics/Latinos may be of any race.
Race / Ethnicity (NH = Non-Hispanic)	Pop 2000	Pop 2010	Pop 2020	% 2000	% 2010	% 2020
White alone (NH)	204	180	177	92.31%	88.24%	81.57%
Black or African American alone (NH)	6	13	38	2.71%	6.37%	17.51%
Native American or Alaska Native alone (NH)	2	0	1	0.90%	0.00%	0.46%
Asian alone (NH)	0	0	0	0.00%	0.00%	0.00%
Native Hawaiian or Pacific Islander alone (NH)	0	0	0	0.00%	0.00%	0.00%
Other race alone (NH)	0	0	0	0.00%	0.00%	0.00%
Mixed race or Multiracial (NH)	0	1	0	0.00%	0.49%	0.00%
Hispanic or Latino (any race)	9	10	1	4.07%	4.90%	0.46%
Total	221	204	217	100.00%	100.00%	100.00%

=== 2000 census ===
As of the census of 2000, there were 221 people, 103 households, and 66 families residing in the town. The population density was 821.1 inhabitants per square mile (317.0/km^{2}). There were 121 housing units at an average density of 449.5 per square mile (173.6/km^{2}). The racial makeup of the town was 93.21% White, 2.71% African American and 4.07% Native American. Hispanic or Latino of any race were 4.07% of the population.

There were 103 households, out of which 19.4% had children under the age of 18 living with them, 61.2% were married couples living together, 1.0% had a female householder with no husband present, and 35.9% were non-families. 32.0% of all households were made up of individuals, and 18.4% had someone living alone who was 65 years of age or older. The average household size was 2.15 and the average family size was 2.70.

In the town, the population was spread out, with 16.7% under the age of 18, 5.0% from 18 to 24, 24.4% from 25 to 44, 29.4% from 45 to 64, and 24.4% who were 65 years of age or older. The median age was 47 years. For every 100 females, there were 85.7 males. For every 100 females age 18 and over, there were 91.7 males.

The median income for a household in the town was $33,281, and the median income for a family was $38,750. Males had a median income of $39,028 versus $21,786 for females. The per capita income for the town was $24,573. About 1.4% of families and 4.5% of the population were below the poverty line, including none of those under the age of eighteen and 12.0% of those 65 or over.
