= Roanoke River National Wildlife Refuge =

National Wildlife Refuge in North Carolina, United States

- IUCN category IV (habitat/species management area)
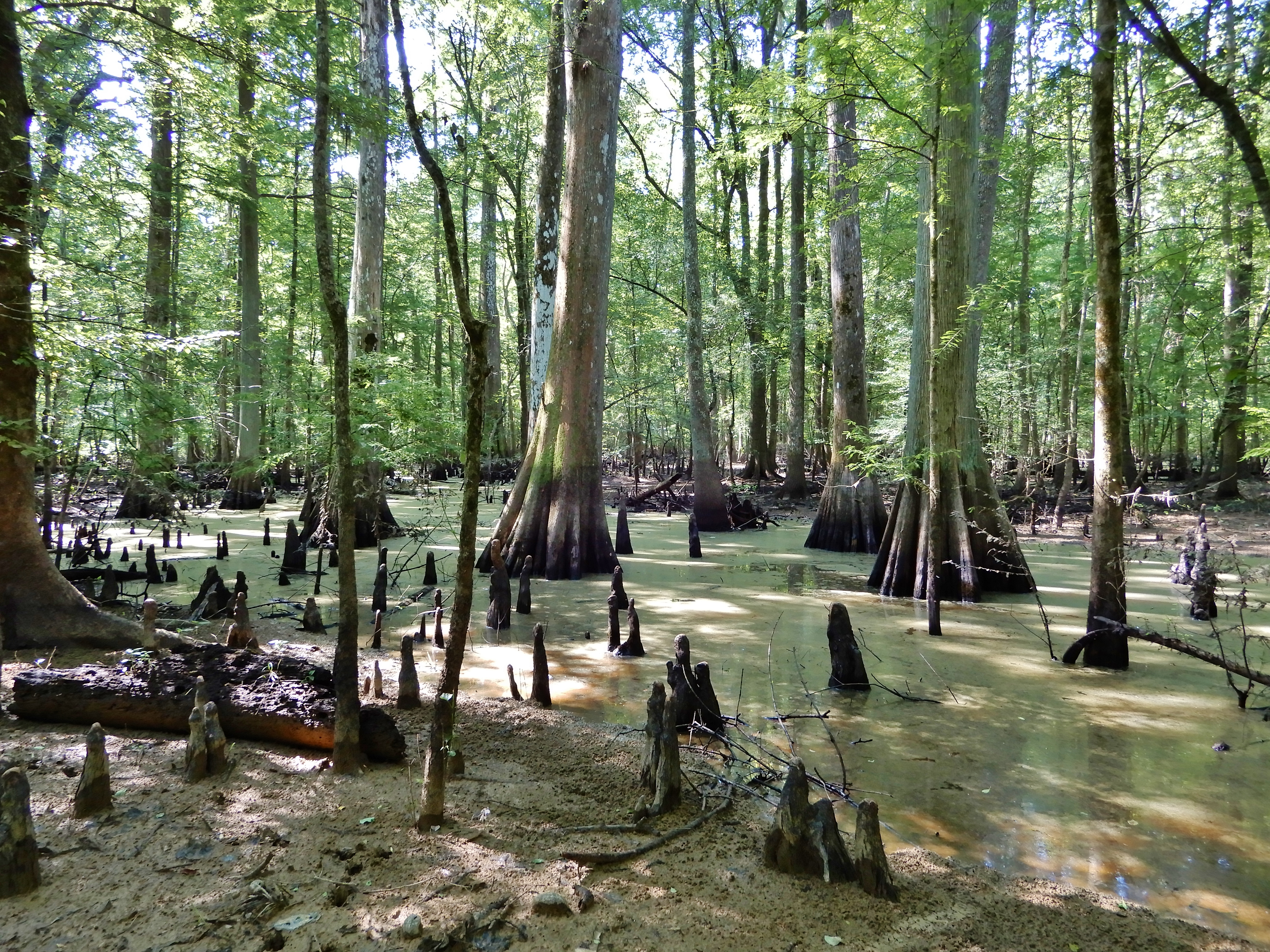
- Cypress swamp at the refuge

- Location within the United States Location within North Carolina
- Location: Roanoke River, Bertie County, North Carolina, United States
- Nearest city: Williamston, North Carolina
- Coordinates: 35°52′46″N 77°00′41″W
- Area: 20,978 acres (84.89 km^{2})
- Established: 1989
- Governing body: U.S. Fish and Wildlife Service
- Website: Roanoke River National Wildlife Refuge

Roanoke River National Wildlife Refuge was established in 1989 to protect and enhance wooded wetlands consisting of bottomland hardwoods and swamps with high waterfowl value along the Roanoke River. The extensive bottomland hardwood habitat of the Roanoke River National Wildlife Refuge is part of what the Nature Conservancy calls "one of the last great places".

Refuge lands consist of bottomland hardwood forest interspersed with cypress-tupelo sloughs that includes forested wetlands in the lower 130 miles (210 km) of the Roanoke River from the Fall Line at Weldon, North Carolina downstream to the Albemarle Sound near Plymouth, North Carolina. The refuge includes part of an extensive wetland ecosystem that contains excellent examples of several southeastern plant communities and habitat types. These include levee forest, cypress-gum swamp, bottomland hardwoods, oxbows, beaver ponds and blackwater streams. These communities add to the rich mosaic of habitat types in the river's floodplain.

The refuge includes valuable wetlands for fish and wildlife; especially waterfowl, neotropical migrants, and anadromous fish. The refuge hosts 214 species of birds, including 88 breeding resident species and the largest inland heron rookery in the state; white-tailed deer; one of the largest natural wild turkey populations in North Carolina; and a remnant population of black bear along with numerous small game and a diversity of fish species, including the endangered shortnose sturgeon.
