= Snakebite Township, Bertie County, North Carolina =

Coordinates: 36.0908°N 77.0566°W

Snakebite Township is an inactive township in Bertie County, in the U.S. state of North Carolina.

== History ==
Snakebite Township was so-named when a state guardsman bit off the head of a snake in order to win a bet.
