= Jacob Montgomery =

American sharecropper and politician

Jacob H. Montgomery (January 15, 1854 – ?) was an American politician.

Jacob Montgomery was born on January 15, 1854 in Warrenton, North Carolina. He was educated at Shaw University in Raleigh and worked as a school teacher.

In 1880, a dissident convention of Warren County Republicans nominated Montgomery to run for a seat in the North Carolina House of Representatives, but he lost to a candidate nominated by the regular convention. He served in the North Carolina House of Representatives in 1883 and was then elected to the North Carolina Senate in 1884.

He later attended Howard University, obtaining a medical degree in 1896 and was subsequently hired by the U.S. Department of War.

== See also ==
- African American officeholders from the end of the Civil War until before 1900

== Works cited ==
- Justesen, Benjamin R. (July 2009). "'The Class of '83': Black Watershed in the North Carolina General Assembly". The North Carolina Historical Review. 86 (3): 282–308. ISSN 0029-2494. JSTOR 23523861.
- Justesen, Benjamin R. (2012). George Henry White: An Even Chance in the Race of Life (reprint ed.). Baton Rouge: Louisiana State University Press. ISBN 9780807144770.
- Lamb, David Smith, ed. (1900). Howard University Medical Department: A Historical, Biographical and Statistical Souvenir. Washington D. C.: Howard University College of Medicine. ISBN 0-8369-8946-5.
- Tomlinson, J. S. (1883). Assembly Sketch Book, Session 1883. North Carolina. Vol. 2. Raleigh: Edwards, Broughton & Co., Steam Printers and Binders.
- Wellman, Manly Wade (2002). The County of Warren, North Carolina, 1586-1917 (reprint ed.). Chapel Hill: The University of North Carolina Press. pp. 182–183. ISBN 9780807854723.
