= A. R. Bridgers =

North Carolina politician

Aaron R. Bridgers was an American teacher, attorney, and state legislator in North Carolina. An African American and Republican, he represented Edgecombe County in the North Carolina House of Representatives in 1883.

Bridgers graduated from St. Augustine's College in Raleigh and was a school teacher in Tarboro.

He was elected in 1882 when, at the age of 28, he was studying law. He lived in Edgecombe County. He authored a bill to establish two schools, one for white children and another for African Americans. Whites objected that they would pay more in taxes for the two schools and objected to the proposal as unfair.

After serving in the legislature, Bridgers graduated from Howard University's law school in 1886. He was admitted to the North Carolina bar in 1887 then moved to Winston-Salem, North Carolina.

== Edward Bridgers ==
Edward Bridgers represented Edgecombe County in 1889.

== See also ==
- African American officeholders from the end of the Civil War until before 1900
