= Askewville, North Carolina =

- Town
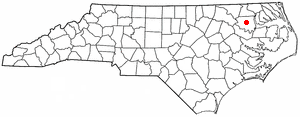
- Location of Askewville, North Carolina
- Coordinates: 36°06′42″N 76°56′28″W
- Country: United States
- State: North Carolina
- County: Bertie

Area
  - Total: 0.59 sq mi (1.53 km^{2})
  - Land: 0.59 sq mi (1.53 km^{2})
  - Water: 0 sq mi (0.00 km^{2})
- Elevation: 66 ft (20 m)

Population (2020)
  - Total: 184
  - Density: 310.9/sq mi (120.02/km^{2})
- Time zone: UTC-5 (Eastern (EST))
  - Summer (DST): UTC-4 (EDT)
- ZIP code: 27983
- Area code: 252
- FIPS code: 37-02320
- GNIS feature ID: 2405176

Askewville is a town in Bertie County, North Carolina, United States. The population was 184 at the 2020 census.

== Geography ==
According to the United States Census Bureau, the town has a total area of 0.50 square miles (1.3 km^{2}), all land.

== Demographics ==
Historical population
Census	Pop.	Note	%±
1960	195		—
1970	247		26.7%
1980	227		−8.1%
1990	201		−11.5%
2000	180		−10.4%
2010	241		33.9%
2020	184		−23.7%
U.S. Decennial Census

=== Racial and ethnic composition ===
Askewville town, North Carolina – Racial and ethnic composition Note: the US Census treats Hispanic/Latino as an ethnic category. This table excludes Latinos from the racial categories and assigns them to a separate category. Hispanics/Latinos may be of any race.
Race / Ethnicity (NH = Non-Hispanic)	Pop 2000	Pop 2010	Pop 2020	% 2000	% 2010	% 2020
White alone (NH)	178	231	173	98.89%	95.85%	94.02%
Black or African American alone (NH)	0	7	4	0.00%	2.90%	2.17%
Native American or Alaska Native alone (NH)	2	0	0	1.11%	0.00%	0.00%
Asian alone (NH)	0	1	0	0.00%	0.41%	0.00%
Native Hawaiian or Pacific Islander alone (NH)	0	0	0	0.00%	0.00%	0.00%
Other race alone (NH)	0	0	0	0.00%	0.00%	0.00%
Mixed race or Multiracial (NH)	0	2	1	0.00%	0.83%	0.54%
Hispanic or Latino (any race)	0	0	6	0.00%	0.00%	3.26%
Total	180	241	184	100.00%	100.00%	100.00%

=== 2000 census ===
As of the census of 2000, there were 180 people, 75 households, and 60 families residing in the town. The population density was 305.1 inhabitants per square mile (117.8/km^{2}). There were 85 housing units at an average density of 144.1 per square mile (55.6/km^{2}). The racial makeup of the town was 98.89% White and 1.11% Native American.

There were 75 households, out of which 29.3% had children under the age of 18 living with them, 70.7% were married couples living together, 5.3% had a female householder with no husband present, and 18.7% were non-families. 18.7% of all households were made up of individuals, and 9.3% had someone living alone who was 65 years of age or older. The average household size was 2.40 and the average family size was 2.72.

The population was spread out in the town, with 18.3% under the age of 18, 6.1% from 18 to 24, 28.9% from 25 to 44, 33.9% from 45 to 64, and 12.8% who were 65 years of age or older. The median age was 43 years. For every 100 females, there were 85.6 males. For every 100 females age 18 and over, there were 86.1 males.

The median income for a household in the town was $38,333, and the median income for a family was $42,917. Males had a median income of $28,333 versus $24,583 for females. The per capita income for the town was $18,184. About 8.7% of families and 10.8% of the population were below the poverty line, including 3.3% of those under the age of eighteen and 34.0% of those 65 or over.
