= James W. Poe =

State legislator in North Carolina (elected 1882)

James W. Poe was a state legislator in North Carolina. He was African American. He lived in Ashland, North Carolina. He was 28 when he was elected in 1882. He represented Caswell County in 1883, as a Republican Party and served until 1885.

He was the president of the Colored Citizens' Patriotic League in Virginia from at least 1917–1920. The group opposed efforts to repatriate African Americans to Africa and proposals for an African American state in part of what is Mexico. The groups encouraged African Americans to stay in the south noting crowded conditions in northern cities. It also reported discrimination in the northern states.

== See also ==
- African American officeholders from the end of the Civil War until before 1900
