= John Newell (North Carolina politician) =

American state legislator (1874–75 & 1879–84)

John Newell was an American state legislator in North Carolina. He represented Bladen County, North Carolina. He served in the North Carolina House of Representatives from 1874 to 1875 and from 1879 to 1884.

== See also ==
- African American officeholders from the end of the Civil War until before 1900
