= Bertie County, North Carolina =

County in North Carolina, United States

- County
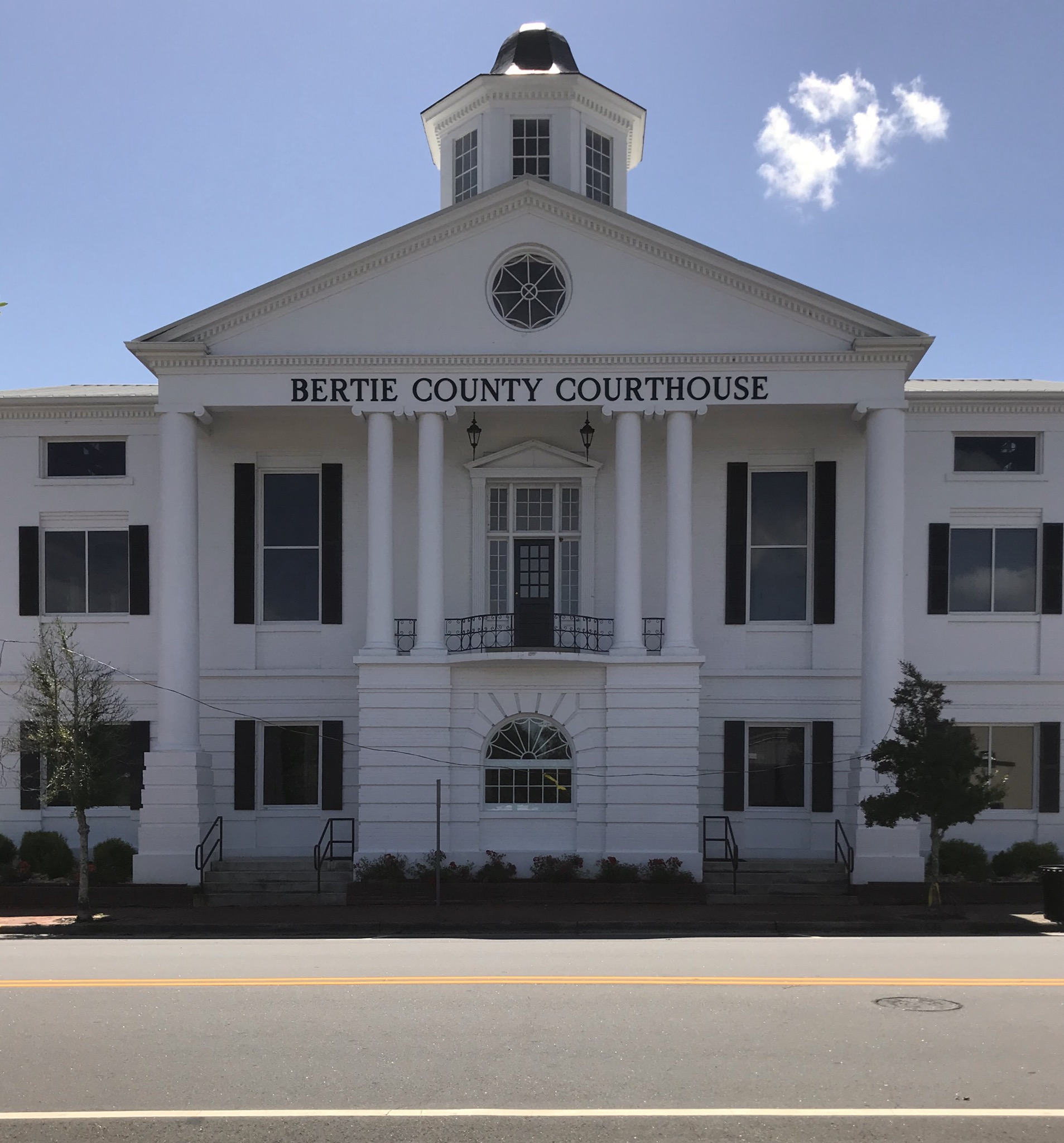
- Bertie County Courthouse in Windsor

- Flag Seal

- Location within the U.S. state of North Carolina
- Interactive map of Bertie County, North Carolina
- Coordinates: 36.06°N 76.96°W
- Country: United States
- State: North Carolina
- Founded: 1739
- Named for: James Bertie and/or Henry Bertie
- Seat: Windsor
- Largest community: Windsor

Area
  - Total: 741.31 sq mi (1,920.0 km^{2})
  - Land: 699.18 sq mi (1,810.9 km^{2})
  - Water: 42.13 sq mi (109.1 km^{2}) 5.61%

Population (2020)
  - Total: 17,934
  - Estimate (2025): 17,086 ▼
  - Density: 25.65/sq mi (9.90/km^{2})
- Time zone: UTC−5 (Eastern)
  - Summer (DST): UTC−4 (EDT)
- Congressional district: 1st
- Website: www.co.bertie.nc.us

Bertie County (/ˈbɜːrˈtiː/ BUR-TEE) is a county located in the northeast area of the U.S. state of North Carolina. As of the 2020 census, the population was 17,934. Its county seat is Windsor. The county was created in 1722 as Bertie Precinct and gained county status in 1739.

== History ==
The county was formed as Bertie Precinct in 1722 from the part of Chowan Precinct of Albemarle County lying west of the Chowan River. It was named for James Bertie, his brother Henry Bertie, or perhaps both, each having been one of the Lords Proprietors of Carolina.

In 1729 parts of Bertie Precinct, Chowan Precinct, Currituck Precinct, and Pasquotank Precinct of Albemarle County were combined to form Tyrrell Precinct. With the abolition of Albemarle County in 1739, all of its constituent precincts became separate counties. As population of settlers increased, in 1741 parts of Bertie County were organized as Edgecombe County and Northampton County. Finally, in 1759 parts of Bertie, Chowan, and Northampton counties were combined to form Hertford County. Bertie's boundaries have remained the same since then.

This mostly rural county depended on the agricultural economy well into the 20th century. In the colonial and antebellum eras, tobacco and cotton were the chief commodity crops, worked by Indian and African slaves. After the Civil War, agriculture continued to be important to the county. In the 21st century, developers have referred to it as being within the Inner Banks region, which is increasingly attracting retirees and buyers of second homes, because of its beaches and landscapes.

== Geography ==
According to the U.S. Census Bureau, the county has a total area of 741.31 square miles (1,920.0 km^{2}), of which 699.18 square miles (1,810.9 km^{2}) is land and 42.13 square miles (109.1 km^{2}) (5.61%) is water.

=== National protected area ===
- Roanoke River National Wildlife Refuge

=== State and local protected areas/sites ===
- Bachelor Bay Game Land (part)
- Bertie County Game Land
- Chowan Swamp Game Land (part)
- Historic Hope Plantation
- Jamesville Wildlife Preserve
- Lewiston Woodville Preserve
- Lower Roanoke River Wetlands Game Land (part)
- Salmon Creek State Natural Area
- Upper Roanoke River Wetlands Game Land (part)

=== Major water bodies ===
- Albemarle Sound
- Beaverdam Swamp
- Cashie River
- Chowan River
- Chinkapin Swamp
- Cucklemaker Creek
- Cypress Swamp
- Falt Swamp Creek
- Hoggard Mill Creek
- Loosing Swamp
- Middle River
- Quioccosin Creek
- Roanoke River
- Stoney Creek
- Wahton Swamp
- Wildcat Swamp

=== Adjacent counties ===
- Hertford County – north
- Chowan County – east
- Washington County – southeast
- Martin County – south
- Halifax County – west
- Northampton County – northwest

=== Major highways ===
- Future I-87
- US 13
- US 13 Bus.
- US 17
- US 17 Bus.
- US 17 Byp.
- NC 11
- NC 11 Bus.
- NC 42
- NC 45
- NC 305
- NC 308

=== Major infrastructure ===
- Sans Souci Ferry, river ferry across the Cashie River

== Demographics ==
Historical population
Census	Pop.	Note	%±
1790	12,462		—
1800	11,249		−9.7%
1810	11,218		−0.3%
1820	10,805		−3.7%
1830	12,262		13.5%
1840	12,175		−0.7%
1850	12,851		5.6%
1860	14,310		11.4%
1870	12,950		−9.5%
1880	16,399		26.6%
1890	19,176		16.9%
1900	20,538		7.1%
1910	23,039		12.2%
1920	23,993		4.1%
1930	25,844		7.7%
1940	26,201		1.4%
1950	26,439		0.9%
1960	24,350		−7.9%
1970	20,528		−15.7%
1980	21,024		2.4%
1990	20,388		−3.0%
2000	19,773		−3.0%
2010	21,282		7.6%
2020	17,934		−15.7%
2025 (est.)	17,086	▼	−4.7%
U.S. Decennial Census; 1790–1960 1900–1990; 1990–2000 2010 2020

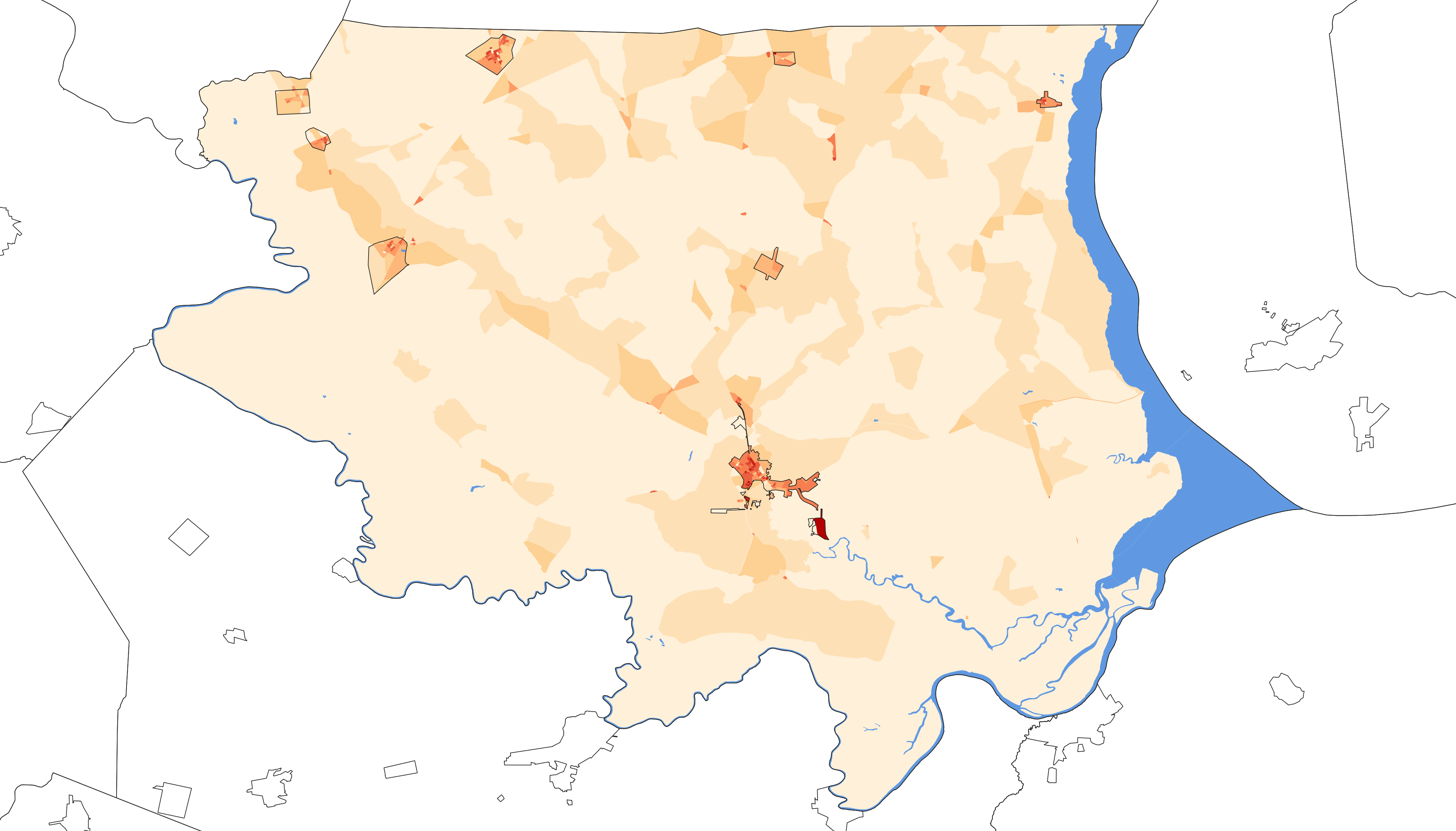
2020 population density of Bertie County NC by census block

=== 2020 census ===
Bertie County, North Carolina – Racial and ethnic composition Note: the US Census treats Hispanic/Latino as an ethnic category. This table excludes Latinos from the racial categories and assigns them to a separate category. Hispanics/Latinos may be of any race.
Race / Ethnicity (NH = Non-Hispanic)	Pop 1980	Pop 1990	Pop 2000	Pop 2010	Pop 2020	% 1980	% 1990	% 2000	% 2010	% 2020
White alone (NH)	8,501	7,782	7,124	7,393	6,298	40.43%	38.17%	36.03%	34.74%	35.12%
Black or African American alone (NH)	12,193	12,512	12,277	13,252	10,674	58.00%	61.37%	62.09%	62.27%	59.52%
Native American or Alaska Native alone (NH)	12	44	67	88	57	0.06%	0.22%	0.34%	0.41%	0.32%
Asian alone (NH)	21	14	20	103	63	0.10%	0.07%	0.10%	0.48%	0.35%
Native Hawaiian or Pacific Islander alone (NH)	x	x	1	0	0	x	x	0.01%	0.00%	0.00%
Other race alone (NH)	2	4	4	6	49	0.01%	0.02%	0.02%	0.03%	0.27%
Mixed race or Multiracial (NH)	x	x	85	173	463	x	x	0.43%	0.81%	2.58%
Hispanic or Latino (any race)	295	32	195	267	330	1.40%	0.16%	0.99%	1.25%	1.84%
Total	21,024	20,388	19,773	21,282	17,934	100.00%	100.00%	100.00%	100.00%	100.00%

As of the 2020 census, Bertie County had a population of 17,934, with 7,264 households and 4,531 families, and a population density of 24 people per square mile. The same census also recorded Bertie County as having the highest proportion of black residents among all counties in the state.

The median age was 47.1 years; 16.9% of residents were under 18 and 22.8% were 65 years of age or older. For every 100 females there were 103.4 males, and for every 100 females age 18 and over there were 103.3 males age 18 and over.

The racial makeup of the county was 35.3% White, 59.8% Black or African American, 0.4% American Indian and Alaska Native, 0.4% Asian, <0.1% Native Hawaiian and Pacific Islander, 1.2% from some other race, and 3.0% from two or more races. Hispanic or Latino residents of any race comprised 1.8% of the population.

Less than 0.1% of residents lived in urban areas, while 100.0% lived in rural areas.

There were 7,264 households in the county, of which 24.1% had children under the age of 18 living in them. Of all households, 37.4% were married-couple households, 19.7% were households with a male householder and no spouse or partner present, and 38.1% were households with a female householder and no spouse or partner present. About 33.8% of all households were made up of individuals and 17.2% had someone living alone who was 65 years of age or older.

There were 8,936 housing units, of which 18.7% were vacant. Among occupied housing units, 71.4% were owner-occupied and 28.6% were renter-occupied. The homeowner vacancy rate was 1.4% and the rental vacancy rate was 8.7%.

Income information was not available for the county in 2020. However, in 2019, the median income for women in the county was $22,443, and $27,992 for men.

=== 2010 census ===
At the 2010 census, there were 21,282 people living in the county. 62.5% were Black or African American, 35.2% White, 0.5% Asian, 0.5% Native American, 0.5% of some other race and 0.9% of two or more races. 1.3% were Hispanic or Latino (of any race).

=== 2000 census ===
At the 2000 census, there were 19,773 people, 7,743 households, and 5,427 families living in the county. The population density was 28 people per square mile (11 people/km^{2}). There were 9,050 housing units at an average density of 13 units per square mile (5.0 units/km^{2}). The racial makeup of the county was 62.34% Black or African American, 36.30% White, 0.44% Native American, 0.11% Asian, 0.01% Pacific Islander, 0.33% from other races, 0.48% from two or more races. 0.99% of the population were Hispanic or Latino of any race.

There were 7,743 households, out of which 29.70% had children under the age of 18 living with them, 46.00% were married couples living together, 20.10% had a female householder with no husband present, and 29.90% were non-families. 27.00% of all households were made up of individuals, and 13.10% had someone living alone who was 65 years of age or older. The average household size was 2.53 and the average family size was 3.07.

In the county, the population was spread out, with 26.10% under the age of 18, 7.70% from 18 to 24, 26.40% from 25 to 44, 23.80% from 45 to 64, and 16.00% who were 65 years of age or older. The median age was 39 years. For every 100 females there were 87.60 males. For every 100 females age 18 and over, there were 82.00 males.

The median income for a household in the county was $25,177, and the median income for a family was $30,186. Males had a median income of $26,866 versus $18,318 for females. The per capita income for the county was $14,096. About 19.30% of families and 26% of the population were below the poverty line, including 30.70% of those under age 18 and 28.30% of those age 65 or over.

=== Recent Population Trends and Estimates ===
The 2024 population estimate for Bertie County is 16,939. This is a decrease of approximately 5.5% since 2020. This decline is consistent with long-term trends showing decreasing population levels in the area for multiple decades.

=== Socioeconomic Indicators ===
Bertie County has shown persistent economic challenges over the past few decades. The estimated median household income across 2019-2023 is $45,931, which is below the state median. 19.8% of residents live below both the federal poverty line. Approximately 82% of adults 25 years or older have at least a high school diploma, while only 17.8% hold a bachelor’s degree or higher. These indicators may suggest socioeconomic limitations that restrict upward mobility for residents within the area.

=== Migration Patterns and Population Decline ===
Bertie County has experienced significant population decline over the past 15 years. The estimated 2025 population for Bertie County is 16,543. This is a significant drop from the 2010 Census, which had a population at 21,282. This is an approximately 22.3% decrease in population over 15 years. Additionally, data from 2019-2023 shows that approximately 10.1% of people in Bertie County moved within the past year.

=== Racial Composition Trends ===
The 2020 Census shows that the racial composition of Bertie County remains heavily skewed towards the Black/African American population. With 59.5% of the population identifying as Black/African American, they compose a majority of the 17,934 residents in 2020. The county remains as one of the most predominantly black counties in North Carolina, which may shape social and economic dynamics across the county.

== Government and politics ==
Bertie County is a member of the Mid-East Commission regional council of governments. The County Sheriff is the chief law enforcement officer.

The 2024 presidential election marked the strongest showing for a Republican candidate in Bertie County since 1984, with Donald Trump winning nearly 42 percent of the county vote.

United States presidential election results for Bertie County, North Carolina
Year	Republican		Democratic		Third party(ies)	
Year	No.	%	No.	%	No.	%
1912	43	2.57%	1,571	93.79%	61	3.64%
1916	116	7.36%	1,461	92.64%	0	0.00%
1920	212	10.33%	1,840	89.67%	0	0.00%
1924	159	8.16%	1,785	91.59%	5	0.26%
1928	374	15.75%	2,000	84.25%	0	0.00%
1932	65	2.02%	3,154	97.83%	5	0.16%
1936	115	2.92%	3,828	97.08%	0	0.00%
1940	98	2.90%	3,287	97.10%	0	0.00%
1944	124	3.80%	3,142	96.20%	0	0.00%
1948	85	2.68%	3,034	95.71%	51	1.61%
1952	384	9.74%	3,557	90.26%	0	0.00%
1956	469	12.21%	3,373	87.79%	0	0.00%
1960	577	13.55%	3,682	86.45%	0	0.00%
1964	931	21.84%	3,332	78.16%	0	0.00%
1968	811	11.38%	3,207	45.00%	3,108	43.61%
1972	2,874	60.54%	1,819	38.32%	54	1.14%
1976	1,332	24.35%	4,117	75.27%	21	0.38%
1980	1,695	30.10%	3,863	68.59%	74	1.31%
1984	2,879	41.91%	3,953	57.54%	38	0.55%
1988	2,145	36.24%	3,762	63.56%	12	0.20%
1992	1,756	26.04%	4,382	64.99%	605	8.97%
1996	1,745	27.83%	4,202	67.01%	324	5.17%
2000	2,488	34.67%	4,660	64.94%	28	0.39%
2004	3,057	38.06%	4,938	61.48%	37	0.46%
2008	3,376	34.58%	6,365	65.20%	22	0.23%
2012	3,387	33.46%	6,695	66.14%	41	0.41%
2016	3,456	36.97%	5,778	61.82%	113	1.21%
2020	3,817	38.89%	5,939	60.51%	59	0.60%
2024	3,840	41.80%	5,279	57.47%	67	0.73%

== Education ==
Public schools in the county are managed by Bertie County Schools. Notable schools in Bertie county include Bertie High School, Lawrence Academy, and Bethel Assembly Christian Academy. The North Carolina Department of Public Instruction rated the county school system as "low-performing" for the 2021–2022 school year.

== Communities ==
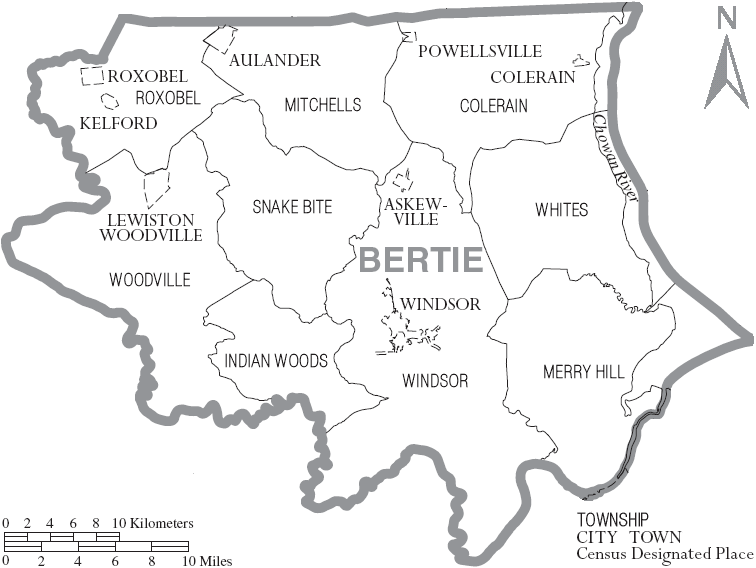
Map of Bertie County with municipal and township labels

=== Towns ===
- Askewville
- Aulander
- Colerain
- Kelford
- Lewiston Woodville
- Powellsville
- Roxobel
- Windsor (county seat and largest community)

=== Townships ===
- Colerain
- Indian Woods
- Merry Hill
- Mitchells
- Roxobel
- Snakebite
- Whites
- Windsor
- Woodville

=== Unincorporated communities ===
- Ashland
- Avoca
- Baker Town
- Buena Vista
- Elm Grove
- Gatlinsville
- Grabtown
- Greens Cross
- Hexlena
- Merry Hill
- Midway
- Perrytown
- Pine Ridge
- Quitsna
- Republican
- Rosemead
- Sans Souci
- Spring Branch
- Todds Cross
- Trap
- Whites Cross
- Woodard

=== Population ranking ===
The population ranking of the following table is based on the 2020 census of Bertie County.

† = county seat

Rank	Name	Type	Population (2020 census)
1	† Windsor	Town	3,582
2	Aulander	Town	763
3	Lewiston Woodville	Town	426
4	Colerain	Town	217
5	Kelford	Town	203
6	Powellsville	Town	189
7	Askewville	Town	184
8	Roxobel	Town	179

== See also ==
- List of counties in North Carolina
- National Register of Historic Places listings in Bertie County, North Carolina
- List of Highway Historical Markers in Bertie County, North Carolina
- Meherrin Indian Tribe, state-recognized tribe that resides in the county
