= Pickerel Lake =

Pickerel Lake can refer to

- Pickerel Lake (Quetico Provincial Park, Ontario) in Thunder Bay, Ontario
- Pickerel Lake (Freeborn County, Minnesota) in Freeborn County, Minnesota
- Pickerel Lake Township in Freeborn County, Minnesota
- Pickerel Lake (Dakota and Ramsey counties, Minnesota)
- Pickerel Lake (Hubbard County, Minnesota) in Hubbard County, Minnesota
- Pickerel Lake (South Dakota) in Day County, South Dakota
  - Pickerel Lake State Park, South Dakota
- Numerous lakes in Michigan
- Numerous lakes in Ontario
