= Tornado outbreak of June 7–8, 1984 =

Tornado outbreak in the Central United States

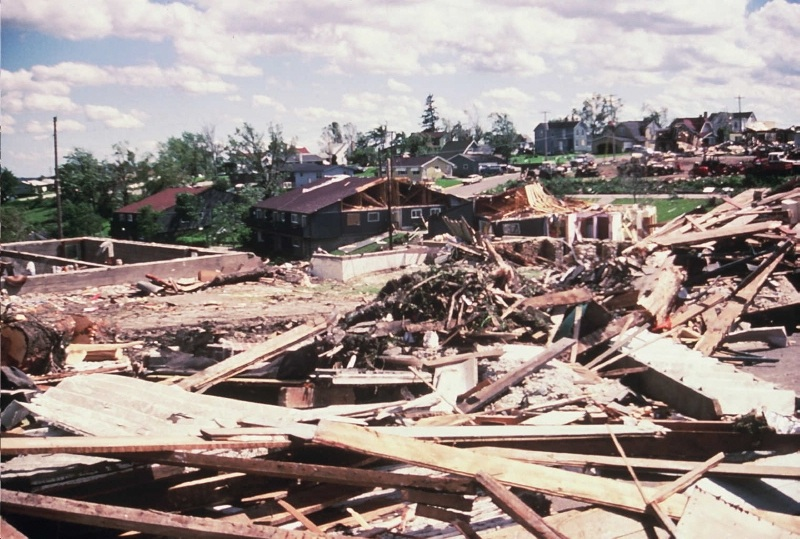
- F5 tornado damage in Barneveld, Wisconsin

Meteorological history
- Duration: June 7–8, 1984

Tornado outbreak
- Tornadoes: 46
- Max. rating: F5 tornado

Overall effects
- Fatalities: 13
- Injuries: 322
- Damage: $40 million in Wisconsin alone (1984 USD) $124 million (2025 USD)
- Areas affected: Midwestern United States
- Part of the tornado outbreaks of 1984

On June 7–8, 1984, a significant severe weather event, known as the Barneveld tornado outbreak, took place across the Central United States from North Dakota to Kansas, producing several significant tornadoes, including an F5 tornado which traveled through Barneveld, Wisconsin in the early hours of June 8. Additionally, a long-tracked F4 tornado—most likely a family—crossed the Missouri–Iowa state line on June 7, killing three. Intense tornadoes also occurred elsewhere in Iowa, as well as in Minnesota and Wisconsin. The entire outbreak killed at least 13 across three different states—Nine of which were killed in Barneveld alone, and injured a total of 322 people.

== Meteorological synopsis ==
A low-pressure system entered the Midwestern United States on June 7, 1984, and intensified while bringing a surge of moist and humid air coming from the Gulf of Mexico. After most of the affected areas were hit by a mesoscale convective complex earlier during the morning of June 7, the unstable atmosphere, as well as wind shear and high convective available potential energy (CAPE), produced a favorable environment for the development of extensive severe weather with possible tornadoes. Starting at around mid-afternoon, it started to produce several tornadoes across southern Minnesota and northwestern and southern Iowa including three F3s and a long-track F4 which traveled over 130 mi (210 km) from extreme northern Missouri to southwest of Iowa City. That tornado killed 3 people including one in Missouri's Harrison County. Another person was killed in Ringgold County in Iowa by an F2 tornado at around 9:00 pm CDT. Activity continued through the overnight hours as a new cluster of storms developed across Wisconsin near the Iowa–Illinois borders and produced strong tornadoes including the Barneveld tornado up until the early morning hours of June 8, 1984, before dissipating. Straight-line winds in excess of 100 mph (160 km/h) and very large hail were also reported in eastern Iowa from the storm that went on to drop the tornado in Barneveld, Wisconsin.

== Confirmed tornadoes ==
Confirmed tornadoes by Fujita rating
FU	F0	F1	F2	F3	F4	F5	Total
0	4	12	24	4	1	1	46

=== June 7 event ===
List of confirmed tornadoes – Thursday, June 7, 1984
F#	Location	County / Parish	State	Start Coord. (Note: All starting coordinates are based on the NCEI database and may not reflect contemporary analyses)	Time	Path length	Width (Note: The listed width values are primarily the average/mean width of the tornadoes, with those having known maximum widths denoted by ♯. From 1952 to 1994, reports largely list mean width whereas contemporary years list maximum width. Values provided by Grazulis are the average width, with estimates being rounded down (i.e. 0.5 mi (0.80 km) is rounded down from 880 yards to 800 yards).)	Damage
F2	Moreauville	Avoyelles	LA	31.03°N 91.98°W	06:55–?	1 mi (1.6 km)	100 yd (91 m)	$250,000
F2	A brief tornado felled power lines and trees, while wrecking outbuildings and a pair of homes. Three minor injuries occurred.							
F1	SW of Moville to SSW of Kingsley	Woodbury, Plymouth	IA	42.48°N 96.08°W	20:45–21:03	7 mi (11 km)	100 yd (91 m)	#500,000
F1	A tornado severely damaged a trio of barns, along with several outbuildings, but did little damage to farmhouses.							
F2	WNW of Quimby to NW of Cherokee	Cherokee	IA	42.65°N 95.73°W	21:14–21:33	10 mi (16 km)	77 yd (70 m)	$2,500,000
F2	Striking 15 farms, this tornado damaged outbuildings and downed trees. Tornado expert Thomas P. Grazulis did not rate it F2 or stronger.							
F0	S of Carson	Grant	ND	46.4°N 101.57°W	21:30–?	0.3 mi (0.48 km)	10 m (11 yd)	Unknown
F0	This tornado formed briefly over open land, doing no damage.							
F2	S of Fairview (KS) to S of Rulo (NE)	Brown	KS	39.82°N 95.72°W	21:33–22:05	18 mi (29 km)	300 yd (270 m)	$2,500,000
F2	A strong tornado destroyed or damaged 140 outbuildings, four trailers, and 38 houses, doing its worst damage near Hiawatha. It also tipped four semi-trailer trucks onto their sides, unroofed silos, tore apart farm machinery, rolled hay bales, and injured five people, hospitalizing three.							
F2	SSW of Holstein to N of Galva	Ida	IA	42.42°N 95.58°W	21:42–22:10	16 mi (26 km)	150 yd (140 m)	$2,500,000
F2	This tornado tore roofing off a few homes and damaged a grain elevator, causing an injury. Grazulis did not rate it F2 or stronger.							
F2	WNW of Grant to E of Anita	Cass	IA	41.17°N 95.07°W	21:43–?	23 mi (37 km)	150 yd (140 m)	$2,500,000
F2	A strong tornado struck 29 farms, causing severe damage to homes, outbuildings, and farm equipment; it also wrecked a fertilizer plant. Eight people were injured.							
F1	S of Primghar to SW of Hartley	O'Brien	IA	43.07°N 95.62°W	22:04–22:15	6 mi (9.7 km)	77 yd (70 m)	$250,000
F1	This tornado leveled a century-old barn and downed many trees, while also lifting feed bins, corncribs, hog houses, and milk sheds.							
F2	SW of Arthur	Ida	IA	42.32°N 95.38°W	22:10–22:33	12 mi (19 km)	100 yd (91 m)	$2,500,000
F2	A tornado tossed a pair of grain bins across a road, one of which smashed the roofs of a few cars, and damaged the roof and interior of a café, injuring one person. Grazulis did not rate it F2 or stronger.							
F2	Northern Storm Lake to SE of Truesdale	Buena Vista	IA	42.65°N 95.2°W	22:12–22:20	4 mi (6.4 km)	100 yd (91 m)	$2,500,000
F2	A tornado destroyed outbuildings on several farms and badly damaged homes, injuring three people.							
F2	Laurens to Rodman	Pocahontas, Palo Alto	IA	42.85°N 94.85°W	22:17–22:57	25 mi (40 km)	100 yd (91 m)	$5,000,000
F2	A multiple-vortex tornado tore the roof off a warehouse, overturned a trailer, severely damaged farmhouses, killed livestock, and destroyed outbuildings. Debris, including glass, pierced carpet and furniture. A few people were injured.							
F3	Clarinda to S of Corning	Page, Taylor, Adams	IA	40.73°N 95.03°W	22:20–?	25 mi (40 km)	100 yd (91 m)	$7,500,000
F3	An intense tornado damaged 25 homes in northern Clarinda, one of which—a well-built house—it destroyed, along with a trailer. Elsewhere it destroyed 24 outbuildings and sheds as well, while killing livestock. Three people were injured.							
F1	N of Everly	Clay	IA	43.17°N 95.33°W	22:23–22:27	1 mi (1.6 km)	77 yd (70 m)	$250,000
F1	This tornado superficially damaged homes, affecting exteriors, windows, and roofs; it also hit outbuildings.							
F2	Spencer	Clay	IA	43.15°N 95.15°W	22:30–22:32	2 mi (3.2 km)	77 yd (70 m)	$250,000
F2	A strong tornado downed power lines and trees, while tearing off the roofs of a few homes. It damaged five homes in all.							
F0	W of Burlington	Ward	ND	48.28°N 101.47°W	22:37–?	0.5 mi (0.80 km)	10 yd (9.1 m)	Unknown
F0	A brief tornado did no known damage.							
F2	Havelock to N of Plover	Pocahontas	IA	42.83°N 94.7°W	23:00–23:15	8 mi (13 km)	100 yd (91 m)	$2,500,000
F2	This tornado hit three farms, severely impacting outbuildings—sheds, barns, shelters, and bins. Additionally, it tore roofing off a home, while damaging its floors and foundation. It killed 24 pigs as well.							
F2	WNW of Hardy to N of Denhart	Humboldt, Kossuth, Hancock	IA	42.83°N 94.12°W	23:15–23:54	22 mi (35 km)	150 yd (140 m)	$7,500,000
F2	Along with downbursts, this tornado swept through 40 or more farms, severely damaging a number of them. It destroyed a few barns, while damaging outbuildings, equipment, vehicles, bins, and sheds. Grazulis noted a path from Bode to south of Woden.							
F3	Burt to S of Lakota	Kossuth	IA	43.2°N 94.22°W	23:15–23:30	9 mi (14 km)	150 yd (140 m)	$25,000,000
F3	This tornado inflicted major roof and structural damage on a Presbyterian church. It also caused a school to sustain roof damage and collapsed a wall on its second floor. Besides, it did substantial damage to 25 homes, one of which it shifted off its foundation; destroyed several trailers; and hit a grove of 60 black walnut trees, downing half of them. Five injuries occurred.							
F2	SW of Titonka to N of Thompson (1st tornado)	Kossuth, Winnebago	IA	43.22°N 94.07°W	23:29–00:07	21 mi (34 km)	150 yd (140 m)	$5,000,000
F2	Passing near German Valley, a tornado damaged the roof of a school, unroofed a nearby home, leveled another, and drove a 2-by-4-inch (51 by 102 mm) board 3 ft (0.91 m) into a wall. Papers from one of the houses landed 100 mi (160 km) away, in Minnesota. An injury occurred as well.							
F2	SW of Crystal Lake to N of Thompson (2nd tornado)	Hancock, Winnebago	IA	43.2°N 93.82°W	23:45–00:18	18 mi (29 km)	127 yd (116 m)	$5,000,000
F2	A low-end F2 tornado damaged a school and grain elevator, along with barns, sheds, garages, trees, vehicles, a house, and several trailers. It wrecked a large grain bin as well, and may have hit Forest City, doing more damage there.							
F4	SW of Eagleville (MO) to Wright (IA) to Delta (IA) to NW of Amish (IA)	Harrison (MO), Decatur (IA), Wayne (IA), Lucas (IA), Monroe (IA), Mahaska (IA), Keokuk (IA), Iowa (IA)	MO, IA	40.42°N 94.03°W	23:45–02:58	134 mi (216 km)	250 yd (230 m)	$30,650,000
F4	3 deaths – See section on this tornado – 64 people were injured.							
F0	N of Hamberg	Wells	ND	47.77°N 99.52°W	23:59–?	0.5 mi (0.80 km)	10 yd (9.1 m)	Unknown
F0	A tornado hit open country.							
F1	E of Pawnee City	Pawnee	NE	40.1°N 96.12°W	00:00–?	0.3 mi (0.48 km)	50 yd (46 m)	$2,500
F1	A tornado wrecked three outbuildings.							
F1	SW of Albert Lea to S of Manchester	Freeborn	MN	43.65°N 93.32°W	00:15–?	6 mi (9.7 km)	80 yd (73 m)	$250,000
F1	A tornado crossed Pickerel Lake, damaging homes, trees, and farm buildings. It struck 13 sites before dissipating.							
F3	SE of Albert Lea to S of Clarks Grove	Freeborn	MN	43.67°N 93.35°W	00:19–?	14 mi (23 km)	100 yd (91 m)	$25,000,000
F3	An intense tornado destroyed an ambulance station, four businesses, and 13 homes, ripping some houses from their foundations. It also damaged 16 farms, eight businesses, and 52 more homes. A dozen injuries occurred.							
F1	E of Waldorf	Waseca	MN	43.93°N 93.65°W	00:20–?	1 mi (1.6 km)	50 yd (46 m)	$2,500
F1	A tornado hit a few farms, twisting and downing several large trees.							
F1	NNE of Myrtle to W of Ellendale	Freeborn, Steele	MN	43.62°N 93.13°W	00:25–?	16 mi (26 km)	80 yd (73 m)	$2,500,000
F1	An intermittent tornado first tracked 4 mi (6.4 km), hitting four properties. It then briefly lifted, resumed near Hollandale, and ended near Geneva, traveling 6 mi (9.7 km); as it did so it wrecked grain bins and a hangar. It then redeveloped near Ellendale, damaging a farmhouse and destroying outbuildings.							
F2	SSE of Austin	Mower	MN	43.63°N 92.98°W	00:36–?	7 mi (11 km)	100 yd (91 m)	$2,500,000
F2	A strong tornado severely damaged a bowling alley, partly unroofing the structure and causing a wall to collapse. Of the 45 occupants, six were injured. The tornado then crossed a street, wrecking a television repair shop and a home on the other side. It also lofted a truck, injuring its driver, and three automobiles.							
F1	E of Lucas	Lucas	IA	41.02°N 93.42°W	00:54–?	0.5 mi (0.80 km)	50 yd (46 m)	$25,000
F1	A brief tornado caused slight damage.							
F1	ENE of Douglas	Olmsted	MN	44.12°N 92.52°W	01:15–?	1 mi (1.6 km)	50 yd (46 m)	$250,000
F1	A tornado tore apart a barn, dispersing debris 300 yd (270 m), and uplifted another, which it also destroyed. It uprooted trees as well.							
F0	NW of Wastedo	Goodhue	MN	44.42°N 92.88°W	00:35–?	2 mi (3.2 km)	50 yd (46 m)	$25,000
F0	A tornado felled trees, smashed automobile windows, and unroofed a barn. It also tore a steel post from a road sign, impaling a camper.							
F2	S of Mount Ayr to NE of Kellerton	Ringgold	IA	40.68°N 94.23°W	01:45–02:11	14 mi (23 km)	150 yd (140 m)	$2,500,000
F2	1 death – A tornado destroyed half a dozen homes and severely damaged 12 others. It also badly damaged a park and mangled a trailer, killing a person inside. Three injuries occurred.							
F1	S of Humeston	Wayne	IA	40.73°N 93.35°W	02:33–?	0.5 mi (0.80 km)	50 yd (46 m)	$25,000
F1	A tornado did minor damage to a café.							
F2	WNW of Kinross to Windham	Keokuk, Washington, Johnson	IA	41.47°N 92°W	02:33–03:13	24 mi (39 km)	200 yd (180 m)	$2,000,000
F2	The fourth and final member of the Wright–Delta family only hit rural areas, but caused considerable damage to vehicles, farms, and trees, with losses totaling $2 million. Near Kinross it mostly unroofed a church and shattered its windows. Elsewhere it unroofed a home and drove boards into its walls. At Windham it damaged 13 buildings. An injury occurred.							
F2	Northern Stanley to S of Lublin	Chippewa, Clark	WI	44.97°N 90.93°W	03:00–?	12 mi (19 km)	150 yd (140 m)	$500,000
F2	A tornado flattened four barns, split a silo, and destroyed a pair of machine sheds, while doing some home damage. It also felled or snapped large trees, including 13 in a lot.							
F2	N of Howard	Miner	SD	44.02°N 97.53°W	03:00–?	0.1 mi (0.16 km)	60 yd (55 m)	$250,000
F2	A tornado unroofed an antique shop, shattered windows, and tore up signage, along with trees. It also damaged a truck and an automobile dealership. Grazulis did not rate it F2 or stronger.							
F2	SSW of Altamont	Daviess	MO	39.87°N 94.1°W	03:30–?	1 mi (1.6 km)	100 yd (91 m)	$250,000
F2	A tornado splintered a 1-mile-long (1.6 km) row of power poles, badly damaged agriculture, and slightly damaged structures. Grazulis did not rate it F2 or stronger.							
F2	Jamesport	Daviess	MO	39.97°N 93.82°W	04:00–?	3 mi (4.8 km)	100 yd (91 m)	$2,500,000
F2	A tornado destroyed or damaged trailers, farm buildings, and homes, while lacerating a woman's leg.							
F1	Hill	Price	WI	45.67°N 90.37°W	04:30–?	1 mi (1.6 km)	50 yd (46 m)	$25,000
F1	A tornado dislodged a barn, blew off a silo cover, and wrecked a toolshed. It also felled a large tree, damaging a trailer beneath.							

=== June 8 event ===
List of confirmed tornadoes – Friday, June 8, 1984
F#	Location	County / Parish	State	Start Coord.	Time	Path length	Width	Damage
F2	S of Belmont to E of Mineral Point	Lafayette, Iowa	WI	42.73°N 90.33°W	05:30–?	11 mi (18 km)	40 yd (37 m)	$500,000
F2	A tornado unroofed a house and tore off its chimney, while felling 20 trees. It also wrecked sheds, a barn, and a garage.							
F5	SSW of Ridgeway to Barneveld to Black Earth to SE of Lodi	Iowa, Dane	WI	42.97°N 89.98°W	05:41–06:40	36 mi (58 km)	400 yd (370 m)	$40,400,000
F5	9 deaths – See section on this tornado – 200 people were injured.							
F2	DeForest to SSW of South Randolph	Dane, Columbia	WI	43.25°N 89.33°W	06:10–?	18 mi (29 km)	50 yd (46 m)	$5,000,000
F2	A tornado felled trees, tore roofs off a few homes, and destroyed 22 of 24 grain bins.							
F2	NW of Arlington to Rio	Columbia	WI	43.33°N 89.37°W	06:25–?	16 mi (26 km)	50 yd (46 m)	$250,000
F2	A tornado wrecked sheds, farm buildings, three silos, a garage, and a barn.							
F3	N of Rio to Markesan	Columbia, Green Lake	WI	43.45°N 89.23°W	06:41–?	29 mi (47 km)	200 yd (180 m)	$5,000,000
F3	An intense tornado destroyed an entire farm—house, trailer, and outbuildings—near Cambria, injuring a person, and flattened half a dozen barns elsewhere. It also downed trees and pinned 10 cows beneath debris.							
F1	N of East Bristol to E of Doylestown	Columbia	WI	43.3°N 89.15°W	06:49–?	9 mi (14 km)	30 yd (27 m)	$250,000
F1	A tornado unroofed a barn, destroyed an outbuilding, and felled many trees.							
F2	SW of Leipsig to SE of Beaver Dam to Burnett	Dodge	WI	43.43°N 88.93°W	07:17–?	11 mi (18 km)	50 yd (46 m)	≥$640,000
F2	A strong tornado destroyed a few garages, three barns, and a business, damaging 30 buildings in all. It also substantially damaged five homes and injured a person.							

=== Eagleville, Missouri/Wright–Delta, Iowa ===
Eagleville, Missouri/Wright–Delta, Iowa
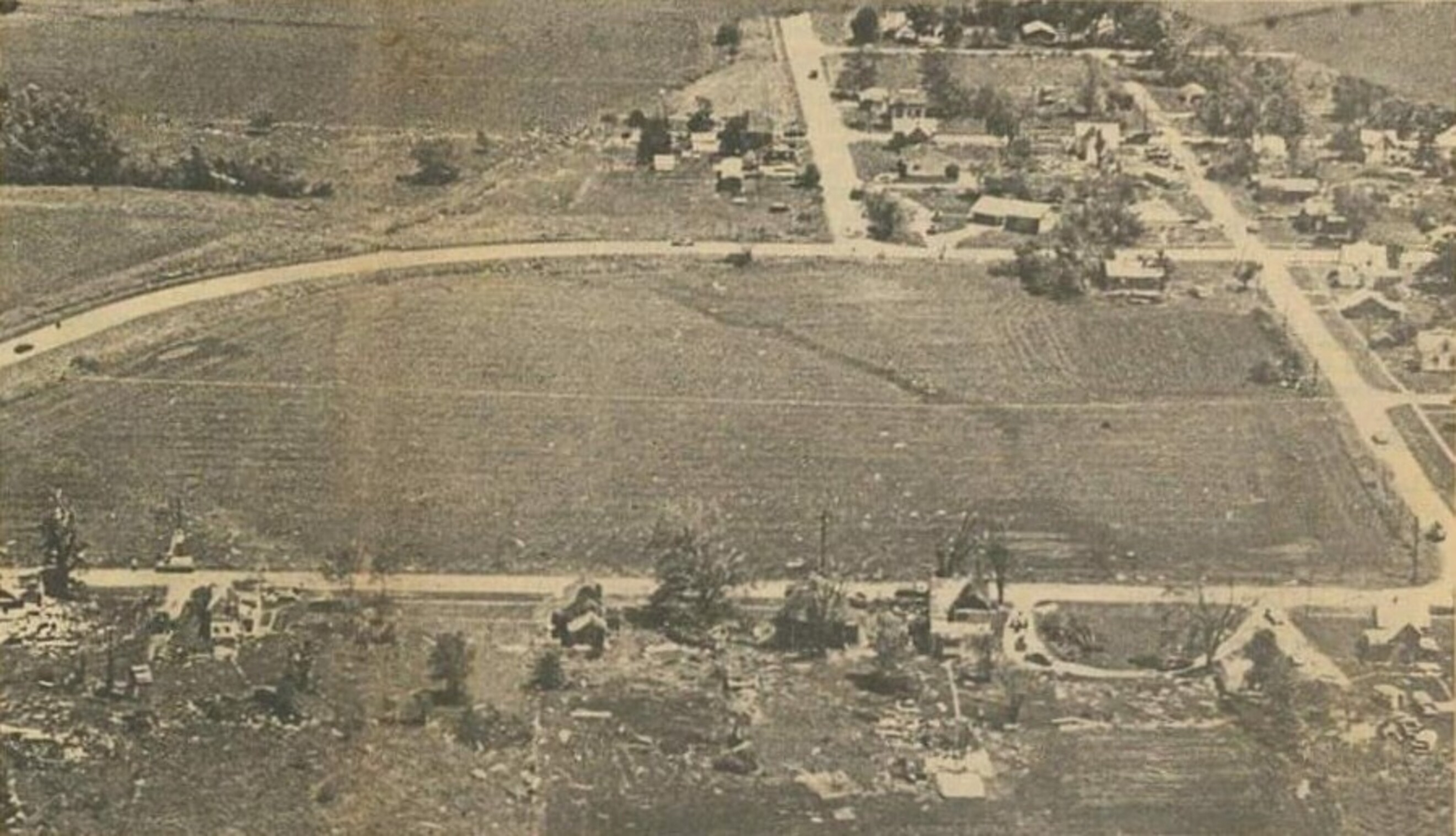
- The north side of Delta, Iowa after the tornado.

Meteorological history
- Formed: June 7, 1984, 6:45 p.m. CDT (UTC−05:00)
- Dissipated: June 7, 1984, 9:58 p.m. CDT (UTC−05:00)
- Duration: 3 hours, 13 minutes

F4 tornado
- on the Fujita scale
- Highest winds: 235 mph (378 km/h)

Overall effects
- Fatalities: 3
- Injuries: 64
- Damage: $30.650 million ($94,980,000 in 2025 USD)

The first member of a long-tracked, violent tornado family wrecked a trailer in Harrison County, Missouri, killing a man and injuring his wife. The tornado badly damaged farms countywide, destroying many barns and farmhouses. It inflicted F3 damage in Missouri before entering Decatur County, Iowa, and striking Nine Eagles State Park. It destroyed a farmhouse near Leon, causing an injury, and wrecked buildings on 17 farms in Wayne County. Near Corydon it leveled half a motel, along with a truck stop. In all it caused $1,750,000 in losses in Wayne County, injuring half a dozen people there. Near Cambria it headed north, tearing loose a portion of a drive-in theater screen and carrying it to Derby. It was seen aloft near Chariton, Lucas County, just before dissipating, having tracked 50 mi (80 km) and injured 10 people. The next member of the family formed over Allerton and ended west of Albia, tracking 35 mi (56 km). A narrow vortex, the 200-yard-wide (180 m) funnel was compared to a yo-yo. Hitting Monroe County, it destroyed or damaged 100 farm buildings and did $500,000 in losses there. Causing F2 damage, it also injured three people: a few in a mobile home and another in a barn.

The third and strongest member of the family formed in Mahaska County near Eddyville and headed northeast, striking the small community of Wright. The tornado tore apart two of the 25 homes there and badly damaged the rest. It also destroyed a church, bank, and community center in town, leaving only a few buildings undamaged. According to Storm Data, between Delta and Wright it reduced farmhouses "to piles of rubble", one of which it moved 10 ft (3.0 m), while flattening outbuildings. In Mahaska County it caused $3.4 million in losses. Entering Keokuk County, it left $25 million in damages there, delivering its worst impacts to northwestern Delta, where Grazulis assessed "near-F5" damage; farms southwest of town received similarly intense damage. In Delta it severely damaged or destroyed an ice-cream vendor, grocery, savings bank, beauty salon, and feed store. Across Keokuk County it badly damaged or destroyed 200 homes, flattened 600 farm buildings, extensively damaged farm equipment, killed 800 cattle and hogs, and hurled an automobile over 300 yd (270 m), fatally ejecting a couple inside. Near South English it lofted a home before dissipating, having traveled 30 mi (48 km) and injured 51 people.

=== Barneveld–Black Earth, Wisconsin ===
Barneveld–Black Earth, Wisconsin
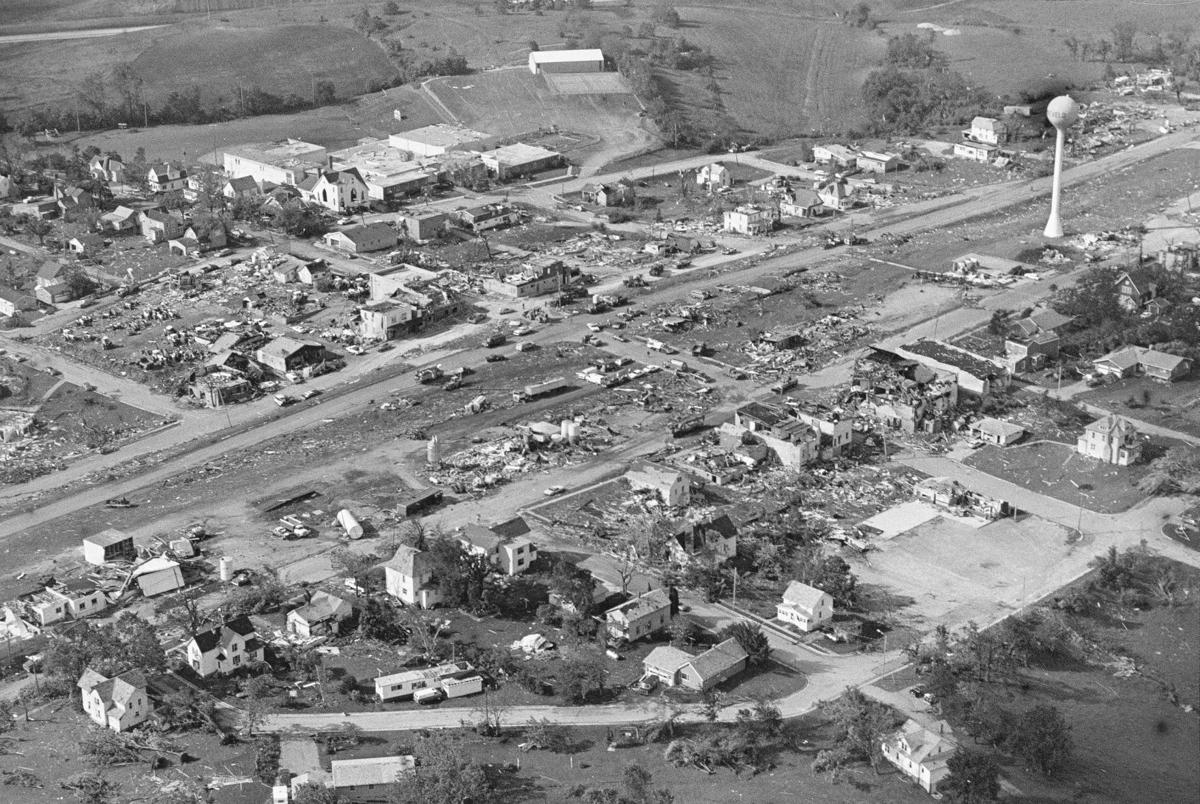
- An aerial photo of Barneveld, Wisconsin after the tornado

Meteorological history
- Formed: June 8, 1984, 12:41 a.m. CDT (UTC−05:00)
- Dissipated: June 8, 1984, 1:40 a.m. CDT (UTC−05:00)
- Duration: 59 minutes

F5 tornado
- on the Fujita scale
- Highest winds: >261 mph (420 km/h)

Overall effects
- Fatalities: 9
- Injuries: 200
- Damage: ≥ $25 million ($77,470,000 in 2025 USD)

This extremely violent and devastating nocturnal tornado formed near Ridgeway, destroying farm buildings near touchdown. Quickly intensifying, the tornado then widened and hit Barneveld, wrecking about 90% of the village. Only a loud thunderclap alerted residents, for lightning strikes had cut power, disabling tornado sirens. (In actuality, the town did not have a tornado siren that differed from the siren used to activate the town's volunteer fire and emergency management squad. If the siren had been activated, the residents would not have known it was a tornado warning.) In Barneveld the tornado destroyed 170 of the 225 buildings, including 17 of 18 businesses, along with 93 homes, a fire station, a bank, a post office, a library, and three churches (the Congregational United Church of Christ, the Lutheran Church, and the Roman Catholic Church). In addition, it badly damaged 64 other homes and swept away several new ones, indicating F5 damage on a cul-de-sac in a subdivision. According to the National Weather Service, it left "only the foundation" on some homesites. In Barneveld it killed nine people and injured 197 others; the latter represented a third of the population. According to Storm Data, debris in Barneveld was lofted a "considerable distance" and pickup trucks were carried at least 100 yd (91 m). The village's water tower, though damaged, was not toppled by the winds.

The tornado also tore apart 24 more homes between Barneveld and Black Earth. Striking Black Earth, it damaged 16 homes, besides many farm buildings, and destroyed eight, causing three injuries. It later hit the Lodi area, downing trees, damaging five homes, and destroying sheds, along with a few barns, before dissipating. Paperwork from Barneveld was carried 135 mi (217 km). The National Weather Service in Madison reported that the frequency of lightning flashes in the storm exceeded 200 per minute. The flashes produced a strobe-like effect, as mentioned in media reports and books about the disaster. The Barneveld tornado is one of three F5s to hit Wisconsin since 1950, the others being the 1958 Colfax and 1996 Oakfield events. While 26 years had elapsed since the last Wisconsin F5, an F5 tornado in the United States occurred a few years prior, near Broken Bow, Oklahoma, in April 1982 and injured 29 people.

== Historical perspective ==
Outbreak death toll
State	Total	County	County total
Iowa	3	Keokuk	1
Iowa	3	Mahaska	1
Iowa	3	Ringgold	1
Missouri	1	Harrison	1
Wisconsin	9	Iowa	9
Totals	13		
All deaths were tornado-related

The Barneveld tornado became the most recent F5/EF5 tornado to touch down at night. Group members prior to Barneveld included the Blackwell, Oklahoma, and Udall, Kansas, tornadoes during the 1955 Great Plains tornado outbreak; the tornado that struck downtown Lubbock, Texas, in 1970; and the Tanner and Guin, Alabama, tornadoes from the 1974 Super Outbreak. Later, the Oak Grove-Birmingham tornado in April 1998, the Greensburg tornado in May 2007 and the Enderlin tornado in June 2025 also joined that group of nighttime F5/EF5 tornadoes.

== See also ==
- List of North American tornadoes and tornado outbreaks
- List of F5, EF5, and IF5 tornadoes

== Sources ==
- Agee, Ernest M.; Childs, Samuel (June 1, 2014). "Adjustments in Tornado Counts, F-Scale Intensity, and Path Width for Assessing Significant Tornado Destruction". Journal of Applied Meteorology and Climatology. 53 (6). American Meteorological Society: 1494–1505. doi:10.1175/JAMC-D-13-0235.1.
- Brooks, Harold E. (April 2004). "On the Relationship of Tornado Path Length and Width to Intensity". Weather and Forecasting. 19 (2): 310–19. Bibcode:2004WtFor..19..310B. doi:10.1175/1520-0434(2004)019<0310:OTROTP>2.0.CO;2.
- Burt, Christopher C. (2004). Extreme Weather: A Guide and Record Book. New York City: W. W. Norton & Company. ISBN 0-393-32658-6 – via Internet Archive.
- Fujita, Ted; Stiegler, Duane J., eds. (June 1984). "Tornado outbreak in the upper Midwest on June 7–8, 1984". Outstanding Storms of the Month. Storm Data. 26 (6). Asheville, North Carolina: National Climatic Data Center.
- Grazulis, Thomas P. (November 1990). Significant Tornadoes 1880–1989. Vol. 2. St. Johnsbury, Vermont: The Tornado Project of Environmental Films. ISBN 1-879362-02-3.
  - — (July 1993). Significant Tornadoes 1680–1991: A Chronology and Analysis of Events. St. Johnsbury, Vermont: The Tornado Project of Environmental Films. ISBN 1-879362-03-1.
  - — (January 1997). Significant Tornadoes Update, 1992–1995. St. Johnsbury, Vermont: The Tornado Project of Environmental Films. ISBN 1-879362-04-X.
- National Weather Service (June 1984). "Storm Data and Unusual Weather Phenomena". Storm Data. 26 (6). Asheville, North Carolina: National Climatic Data Center.
- National Weather Service (June 1984). Storm Data Publication (Report). National Centers for Environmental Information – via Storm Events Database.
