= 1984 Carolinas tornado outbreak =

1984 natural disaster in the Southeastern United States

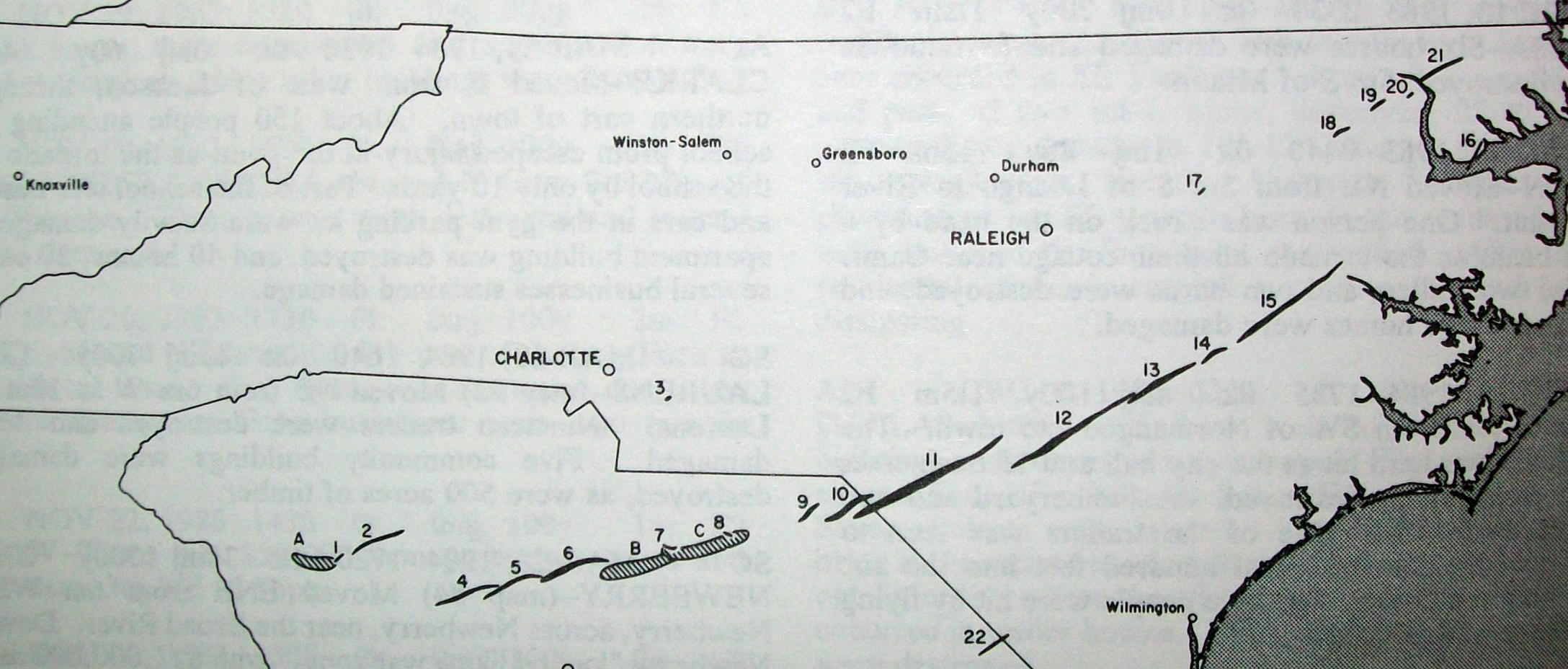
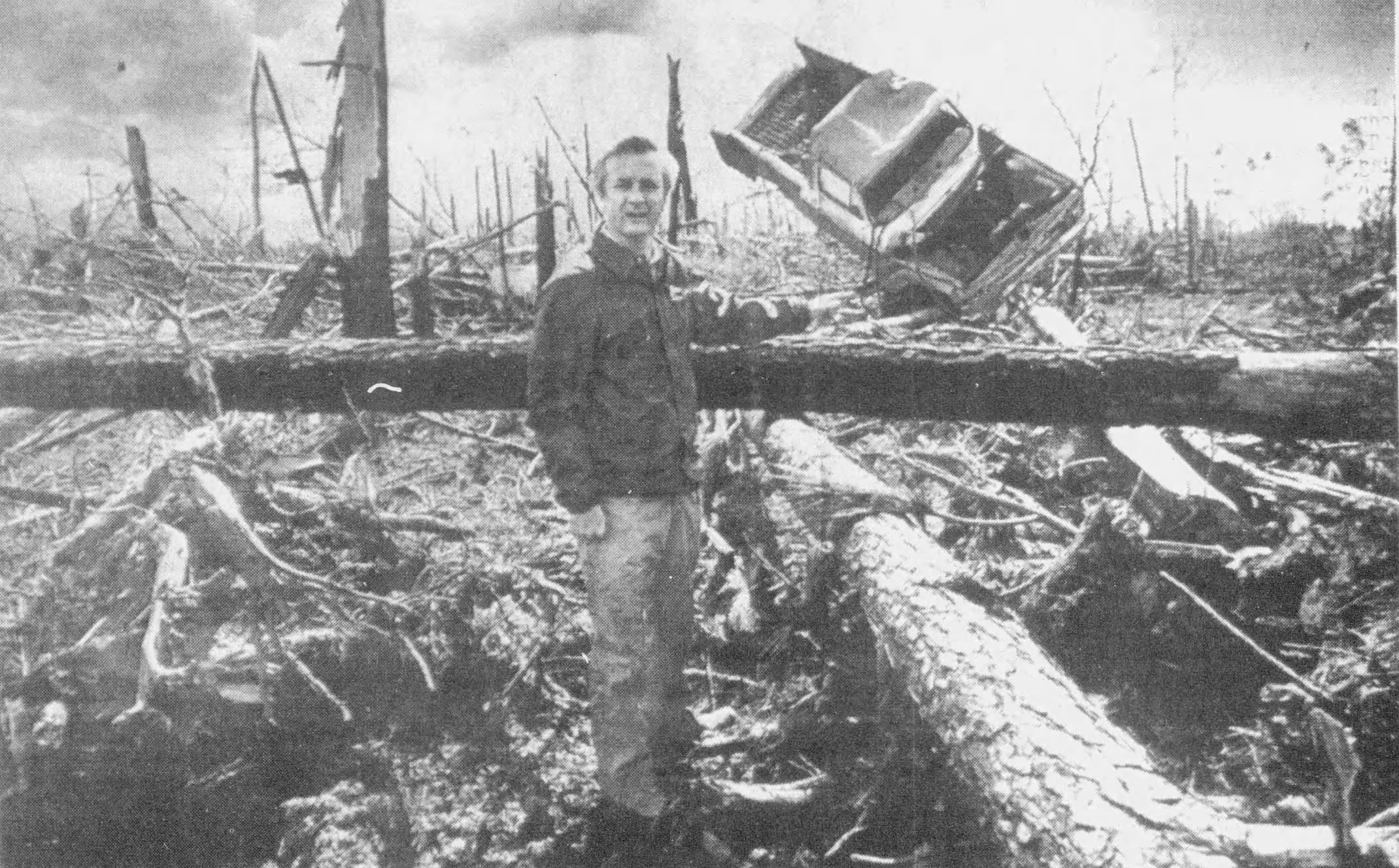
- Clockwise from top: Ted Fujita's original map of the event–tornadoes #4 through 16 were all produced by one supercell. Shaded zones A, B, and C represent downbursts – A radar loop showing several supercells over southeastern North Carolina – Governor Jim Hunt overlooks damage left by an F4 tornado west of Faison in Sampson County, North Carolina (#13 on map).

Meteorological history
- Date: March 28, 1984
- Duration: 7 hours, 55 minutes

Tornado outbreak
- Tornadoes: 24 confirmed
- Max. rating: F4 tornado
- Largest hail: 2.5 in (6.35 cm) in Cumberland County, North Carolina

Overall effects
- Fatalities: 59 (+1 indirect) (Note: A woman was killed by a fallen tree during high winds in Fountain Inn, South Carolina.)
- Injuries: 1,248
- Damage: $578 million (1984 USD)
- Areas affected: Southeastern United States, particularly the Carolinas
- Part of the tornado outbreaks of 1984

During the afternoon, evening, & night hours of Wednesday, March 28, 1984, a deadly and damaging tornado outbreak moved through Georgia and the Carolinas, producing strong downbursts and 24 confirmed tornadoes, of which several were intense–violent. One supercell, moving near the center of a low-pressure area, tracked from eastern Alabama to the North Carolina coastline before heading offshore, producing 13 of the outbreak's 24 tornadoes and becoming responsible for 49 of 57 tornadic fatalities. Individual storms & tornadoes, the majority of which were nocturnal, moved at speeds of up to 60–65 miles per hour (97–105 km/h), with some of the latter reaching widths near or exceeding 1 mile (1.6 km) ; a tornado that crossed into North Carolina from South Carolina (#11 on map) reached a maximum width of 2.5 miles (4.0 km) at one point. Preceding the outbreak, the National Severe Storms Forecast Center, now the Storm Prediction Center, issued a high risk that covered much of the Carolinas; such an issuance would not be seen again in the region until April 16, 2011. March 28, 1984 remained the deadliest high-risk day prior to April 27, 2011, where 271 people died in one day. This was the worst tornado outbreak to affect the Carolinas since the 1884 Enigma tornado outbreak just over a century earlier, and remained unrivaled until April 16, 2011, when 30 confirmed tornadoes struck North Carolina alone. The significant path length of the most notable tornado family, which tracked for at least ~250 miles (400 km) prompted comparisons to the 1925 Tri-State tornado, which had a path length of up to ~219 miles (352 km).

Tornadoes first touched down shortly after ~3:00 p.m. EST (UTC–05:00) in Georgia, continuing into South Carolina throughout the evening. Two more tornadoes struck Laurens County, injuring dozens, and another near Monroe, North Carolina, before a series of tornadoes struck Newberry, Monticello, and Winnsboro, South Carolina respectively, causing seven fatalities altogether and severe damage. After a downtrend in activity, during which tornadoes struck near Kershaw and in the Carolina Sandhills National Wildlife Refuge, three consecutive F4 tornadoes touched down near Cash, Bennettsville, and McColl, South Carolina near nightfall. The latter killed seven, all in South Carolina, and the third killed two in McColl before continuing into North Carolina, where it struck Maxton and Red Springs, killing three. Another series of tornadoes, on the ground almost always synonymously with each other at some point, struck Salemburg, Mt Olive, La Grange, and the Greenville suburbs respectively, killing a combined 31 people, 16 of which were from one tornado. Another supercell to the northeast first produced a tornado near Lewiston Woodville, killing six, then produced two tornadoes near Ahoskie and Harrellsville before producing another tornado that killed two people near Carter. A tornado struck near Loris in South Carolina before continuing into North Carolina and passing near Tabor City, after which the final tornado of the event formed over the Albemarle Sound at ~11:20 p.m. EST and struck Snug Harbor, killing one.

== Meteorological synopsis ==
=== Progression through March 27 ===
On the evening of March 27, upper-air plots identified a broad and powerful upper-level trough exiting the southern Rocky Mountains into the Great Plains. Winds in the upper reaches of the troposphere accelerated upwards of 140 kn (160 mph; 260 km/h) across Texas and Mississippi. In the mid-levels of the atmosphere, the trough detached into a cut-off low, while a potent shortwave trough rounded the base of this feature into the Gulf Coast of the United States. Winds at this level increased to 95 kn (110 mph; 175 km/h), and notably, became increasingly diffluent across the Southeastern United States. Prior to the main event on March 28, several weak tornadoes, rated F0 to F1, occurred in Texas, Louisiana, Alabama, and Georgia.

=== March 28 ===
Early on March 28, a surface area of low pressure developed over eastern Texas and reached a minimum barometric pressure of 987 mb (29.1 inHg) as it pushed into western Tennessee later that day. Winds in the lower levels of the atmosphere intensified to 50–60 kn (60–70 mph; 95–110 km/h) and likewise increased at the surface, contributing to significant warm air advection to the south of a warm front draped across the Appalachian Mountains in North Carolina. By 15:00 UTC, surface dewpoints had surged in excess of 60 °F (16 °C) across Georgia and South Carolina, at which time forecasters at the National Weather Service Severe Local Storms Unit (SLSU) – equivalent to the modern-day Storm Prediction Center – outlined a moderate risk of severe weather from southwestern Georgia northeastward into southern Maryland. Within three hours, these moist dewpoints surged well into eastern North Carolina as the surface low pushed into southern Kentucky.

To the south of the original area of low pressure, a distinct mesoscale low-pressure center developed along the warm front across northern Alabama at around 18:00 UTC, and within three hours, it had rapidly deepened to a barometric pressure of 976 mb (28.82 inHg). This system moved rapidly northeast at speeds up to 55 kn (65 mph; 100 km/h), thus crossing into eastern North Carolina during the evening hours. As it did so, low-level winds across the eastern Carolinas originated from a southerly direction instead of a southwesterly direction; this shift in flow created a strongly sheared environment across the region. Meanwhile, afternoon temperatures climbed above 80 °F (27 °C), contributing to significant destabilization. Convective available potential energy values rose between 2,000 and 3,000 J/kg into North Carolina, with locally higher values observed in northeastern South Carolina.

These environmental conditions bore strong resemblance to the idealized tornado setup across the Carolinas, and they prompted the SLSU to upgrade areas from eastern Alabama into the Outer Banks of North Carolina to a high risk of severe weather, the first occurrence on record in this portion of the United States. As the meso-low moved across the Carolinas, it was supported by a surface trough to its east-northeast which likely formed as a result of differential heating. Strong low-level convergence associated with this feature led to vigorous thunderstorm development in close proximity to the low, where low-level helicity was maximized and highly supportive of supercell thunderstorms. Supercells first began producing tornadoes across Upstate South Carolina around 19:15 UTC and continued to do so as they moved northeast, passing between Columbia and Charlotte around 22:00 UTC, near Fayetteville around 00:00 UTC on March 29, and finally ending north of the Albemarle Sound in northeastern North Carolina around 02:00 UTC. One supercell moving near the center of a low pressure system produced the brunt of the tornadoes that day, of which seven were rated F4 and three F3. In total, 24 tornadoes were confirmed, with 11 each in the Carolinas and 2 in Georgia. The size and scope of the event drew parallels to the 1884 Enigma tornado outbreak and, later, the tornado outbreak of April 16, 2011. March 28, 1984 held the record for number of tornadoes in the Carolinas until the latter event, where 39 tornadoes struck the Carolinas, of which 31 struck North Carolina alone. To date, it holds the record for the most violent tornadoes seen in the Carolinas on a single day. Comparisons were also drawn to the 1925 Tri-State tornado outbreak given the progression of an intense collection of tornadoes located near the meso-low, and the significant track length of an extensive tornado family from South Carolina to North Carolina.

== Confirmed tornadoes ==
Confirmed tornadoes by Fujita rating
FU	F0	F1	F2	F3	F4	F5	Total
0	1	4	7	5	7	0	24*

A preliminary reanalysis by meteorologist Jonathan D. Finch in 2009 uncovered many unconfirmed and/or possible tornadoes, including the following:

=== Georgia ===
- A wind event/possible tornado struck Lithonia in eastern DeKalb County at 3:13 p.m. EST (20:13 UTC), significantly damaging the roof of a business, while also causing roof damage to a nearby apartment. A piece of roofing fell onto an automobile, badly damaging the latter.
- A tornado was sighted near Highway 211 north of Statham in Barrow County around 3:30 p.m. (20:30 UTC), but without damage.
- A tornado formed on Nowhere Road near Sanford in Madison County around 3:45 p.m. EST (20:45 UTC) and passed north of Colbert and Comer, causing a notable swath of tree and structural damage along a path 15 miles (24 km) long. 35 homes sustained moderate–severe damage, and 50 more sustained minor damage. Several trailers were destroyed, and six others were blown from their foundations. Six chicken coops were also destroyed, along with five utility buildings and barns. Over two dozen others incurred minor damage. Trees were felled and thrown across roads, striking buildings.
- A likely tornado hit Point Peter in Oglethorpe County around 3:57 p.m. (20:57 UTC), collapsing a brick building.
- An apparent tornado occurred south of Elberton in Elbert County, where fallen trees hit a home and automobile.

=== South Carolina ===
- A tornado struck north of West View in Abbeville County, flipping a truck & attached trailer and crushing several mobile homes, causing several injuries.
- An apparent tornado struck near Due West in Abbeville County.
- A tornado was sighted along SC 151 between Jefferson and McBee in Chesterfield County, although damage information was not available.

=== North Carolina ===
- A wind event/possible tornado struck Waldos Beach southwest of Hope Mills, where two mobile homes were severely damaged and another was split in half.
- A woman frantically called in a tornado report from the Lake Wendell area.
- A tornado struck the Farm Life area south of Williamston, flattening several storage buildings and felling multiple pine & hardwood trees. One tree was driven several feet into the ground.
- A tornado struck in the Reynoldson area of Gates County, destroying a barn west of US 13.

=== Virginia ===
- A tornado struck Neck Road in extreme southern Chesapeake, destroying a barn, damaging a house, and felling several trees.

List of confirmed tornadoes – Wednesday, March 28, 1984 (Note: All dates are based on the local time zone where the tornado touched down; however, all times are in Coordinated Universal Time for consistency.)
F#	Location	County / Parish	State	Start Coord.	Time (UTC)	Path length	Max width
F1	S of Winder to Fort Yargo State Park	Barrow	GA	33.92°N 83.77°W	20:25	12 mi (19 km)	50 yd (46 m)
F1	A tornado passed south of Winder through Fort Yargo State Park, damaging over one hundred buildings along its path, including thirty chicken houses, several buildings at a golf course, and a mobile home, where one child was injured. Hundreds of trees were felled along the path.						
F0	N of McDonough	Henry	GA	33.48°N 84.15°W	21:30	0.5 mi (0.80 km)	20 yd (18 m)
F0	A brief tornado struck five miles north of McDonough, twisting a large pine tree.						
F1	NE of Ware Shoals	Laurens	SC	34.42°N 82.33°W	21:30	3 mi (4.8 km)	177 yd (162 m)
F1	Accompanied by a downburst which damaged or destroyed 18 homes and injured 24 people in Anderson and Abbeville counties, this brief, weak tornado caused minor damage along a path northeast of Ware Shoals before dissipating as the following tornado developed.						
F2	W of Laurens to Wattsville to N of Clinton	Laurens	SC	34.55°N 82.08°W	21:40	10 mi (16 km)	700 yd (640 m)
F2	A tornado formed six miles west of Laurens, moving east-northeast through Wattsville, a suburb north of Laurens, where 19 mobile homes were destroyed and another 13 were damaged. Five public buildings were damaged or destroyed. 400 acres of timber were also destroyed along the path. The tornado dissipated ten miles northeast of Laurens. 43 people were injured.						
F2	W of Silverstreet to Newberry to the Broad River	Newberry	SC	34.23°N 81.75°W	22:20	23 mi (37 km)	1,000 yd (910 m)
F2	1 death – This tornado formed near Silverstreet, felling trees and destroying several barns before destroying a house & a dairy farm southwest of Newberry. In downtown Newberry, which was described as a "war zone", the tornado ran along Main Street and assumed a multiple-vortex structure, destroying a dance academy, the city hall, and a historic church. 80 businesses in Newberry were damaged or destroyed. The manager of an automotive shop was killed when the building collapsed, trapping several others. After exiting Newberry, the tornado veered eastwards and was absorbed by the following tornado over the Broad River. 39 people were injured.						
F3	E of Newberry to New Hope to S of Monticello	Newberry, Fairfield	SC	34.32°N 81.42°W	22:40–22:53	19 mi (31 km)	870 yd (800 m)
F3	A tornado began east of Newberry, moving east-northeastwards to New Hope, where several buildings were damaged or destroyed. The tornado then turned northeastwards and absorbed the previous tornado over the Broad River before crossing into Fairfield County. After crossing the Monticello Reservoir, the tornado reached F3 intensity south of Monticello, producing notable tree damage before felling power lines & destroying a house. The tornado was then absorbed into the following tornado. Between this and the previous tornado, 254 houses, 86 businesses, 68 farm buildings, 45 manufactured homes, and 7 large public buildings were damaged or destroyed. This tornado injured 10 people.						
F4	W of Winnsboro Mills to Winnsboro to Lake Wateree	Fairfield, Kershaw	SC	34.37°N 81.32°W	23:00	21 mi (34 km)	1,000 yd (910 m)
F4	6 deaths – A tornado formed west of Winnsboro Mills and tracked to the west of Winnsboro, moving northeast, and quickly reached F4 intensity, destroying several houses on isolated hilltops. On the northern fringes of Winnsboro, the tornado struck an area locally referred to as "Smalltown", destroying several poorly constructed houses and mobile homes at F3 intensity and directly killing four people. Another died of a heart attack. Several masonry retail stores collapsed, and the Richard Winn Private Academy was severely damaged just to the northeast, with several portions of the building collapsed. Witnesses reported buses flying into the air. The tornado killed another person along I-77 before turning east-southeastwards into Kershaw County as it crossed Lake Wateree. The tornado again crossed Lake Wateree a short distance later, destroying a mobile home, pushing several others into the water, and damaging 39 boats before dissipating. 49 people were injured.						
F1	N of Monroe	Union	NC	35.13°N 80.55°W	23:10	0.3 mi (0.48 km)	33 yd (30 m)
F1	Ten miles north of Monroe, a tornado destroyed a mobile home, damaged two others, and demolished a garage.						
F4	SE of Kershaw to Abney Crossroads	Lancaster, Kershaw	SC	34.53°N 80.63°W	23:20	4 mi (6.4 km)	530 yd (480 m)
F4	A brief but violent tornado, accompanied by a downburst, formed southeast of Kershaw, destroying a house on SC 341 before crossing into Kershaw County, where it struck a mobile home park and destroyed six mobile homes in Abney Crossroads, dissipating shortly thereafter. 36 people were injured.						
F2	Carolina Sandhills National Wildlife Refuge	Chesterfield	SC	34.57°N 80.17°W	23:40	2 mi (3.2 km)	530 yd (480 m)
F2	A brief tornado struck the Carolina Sandhills National Wildlife Refuge north of McBee, partially devastating it and laying waste to several sections of forest. Power lines were felled and an outbuilding was shifted along SC 145.						
F4	N of Cash to Montrose area	Chesterfield	SC	34.58°N 79.92°W	23:45	7 mi (11 km)	700 yd (640 m)
F4	Another brief, violent tornado formed just to the north of Cash, reaching F4 intensity along Highway 52 as it lifted a house & mobile home and threw both reducing them to rubble. A house nearby was only slightly damaged. Trees near the Montrose area off of S-13-761 were felled in a herringbone pattern, and another strip of forest had almost every tree snapped or uprooted. 36 farm buildings, two businesses, and large swaths of forests near the Great Pee Dee River were damaged or destroyed. 24 people were injured.						
F4	Bennettsville, SC to Laurinburg, NC	Marlboro (SC), Scotland (NC)	SC, NC	34.65°N 79.75°W	00:10–00:25	16 mi (26 km)	2,113 yd (1,932 m; 1.201 mi)
F4	7 deaths – An extremely wide, multiple-vortex tornado formed west of Bennettsville, moving eastwards and causing minor damage at the Marlboro County Jetport. Turning northeastwards into the northern outskirts of Bennettsville, the tornado damaged or destroyed several houses in the vicinity of Highway 9. At the intersection of Highways 9 and 38, the tornado struck the steel-and-masonry construction Northwood Village Shopping Center, decimating the western side of the building; this damage was referred to as "near-F5" in a recap of the event. Several people were inside, but nobody was killed there. Apartment buildings nearby were unroofed, and several more homes were damaged or destroyed. The tornado then struck Lester, where it obliterated a mobile home park, killing four people. F4 damage occurred one again when a house was completely destroyed near the center of town. as were several others on SC 385. Just to the east, the tornado struck Fletcher and Adamsville Crossroads, killing three people, all in frame homes, at the former location. Several houses were damaged or destroyed. Crossing into Scotland County, North Carolina, the tornado continued to cause severe structural damage before striking two mobile home parks in southern Laurinburg, destroying several mobile homes and injuring multiple people. The tornado dissipated shortly thereafter. 100 people were injured.						
F4	Tatum, SC to McColl, SC to Maxton, NC to Red Springs, NC	Marlboro (SC), Scotland (NC), Robeson (NC)	SC, NC	34.63°N 79.60°W	00:20–01:30	45 mi (72 km)	4,400 yd (4,000 m; 2.5 mi)
F4	5 deaths – An enormous tornado first formed southwest of Tatum, moving northeast. In Tatum, several buildings were destroyed along Main Street. The tornado then destroyed several buildings on a farm, including a commissary built in 1847, then struck McColl, by which point it was wider than the town. Two people died in McColl, and several buildings were damaged or destroyed. The tornado crossed into Scotland County, North Carolina shortly afterwards, destroying a mobile home and damaging several other buildings in Hasty before striking Johns, where it killed a man in his truck, destroyed a farmhouse, collapsed a fire department, and left a gas station in "shambles", tearing gas pumps out of the ground. The Scotch Meadows Country Club was also severely damaged Per maps produced by Fujita, it was likely in Scotland County that the tornado reached its peak width of 4,400 yards (4,000 m; 2.5 mi). As it entered Robeson County, the tornado struck Maxton, completely engulfing it. Several buildings were destroyed here, and one house along NC 71 had several exterior walls removed. Trees & power lines across town were downed. The tornado moved through largely rural areas before striking Red Springs; every building in town sustained at least F1-F2 damage. There, the tornado blew out the glass of multiple buildings in the downtown district. Elsewhere in town, several buildings were damaged or destroyed. A school and a large brick buildings sustained roof damage, and trees were felled. Two people died in Red Springs, one in a church when the steeple was ripped off and dropped into the building, collapsing several walls. Northwest of Rex, the tornado swept a house to its flooring and threw two occupants into a field. East of Parkton along Highway 301, the tornado destroyed several mobile homes in a mobile home park and destroyed a mobile home on Roslin Farm Road just before dissipating. 395 people were injured, 280 in Robeson County alone.						
F3	Tobermory area to Salemburg to NE of McCullen	Bladen, Cumberland, Sampson	NC	34.83°N 78.87°W	00:45–01:15	41 mi (66 km)	1,407 yd (1,287 m; 0.799 mi)
F3	12 deaths – See section on this tornado – 101 others were injured. Extensive damage occurred in Bladen, Cumberland, and Sampson counties. Much of the worst damage occurred in a swath from Big Swamp to Roseboro & Salemburg. This was the second deadliest tornado and one of the longest tracking of the outbreak.						
F2	Rocky Mount to West Mount	Nash	NC	35.95°N 77.83°W	01:10	2 mi (3.2 km)	177 yd (162 m)
F2	F2 damage occurred in the West Mount subdivision of Rocky Mount, where several "well-built" homes were destroyed, along with a pair of mobile homes. 30 other houses were damaged.						
F4	SW of Faison to N of Calypso to Mount Olive to Indian Springs	Sampson, Wayne, Duplin	NC	35.05°N 78.25°W	01:15–01:40	21 mi (34 km)	1,407 yd (1,287 m; 0.799 mi)
F4	3 deaths – As the Roseboro tornado was dissipating, a new tornado formed just to the east. This tornado first severely damaged a church and leveled two houses off of NC 403 southwest of Faison, killing one person . Another house was destroyed along Burch Road. The tornado them moved into forested areas, producing a clockwise swirl and snapping, denuding, and partially debarking multiple trees. A car was hurled into the forest and left hanging on a tree. The tornado then destroyed two houses and two trailers, killing another person. The tornado peaked in width shortly before striking the Pine Forest subdivision between Calypso and Mount Olive, destroying 27 of its 28 homes. Mobile homes were also destroyed, and cars were thrown about. The tornado then continued into the southeastern extremity of Mount Olive, where another person died, destroying several houses and damaging many others. A manufacturing plant was also severely damaged. Exiting Mount Olive, the tornado destroyed a house, throwing its occupants some distance away, then destroyed several mobile homes in Hopewell. Nearby, one six foot pine tree was felled and a sheeting board sliced completely through another. In Indian Springs and the surrounding area, the tornado damaged or destroyed several houses, a church, and a mobile home, rolling the occupants several times before dissipating as the following tornado formed. 149 people were injured.						
F3	W of Seven Springs to La Grange	Wayne, Lenoir	NC	35.20°N 77.90°W	01:30–01:37	9 mi (14 km)	527 yd (482 m)
F3	This intense tornado formed west of Seven Springs, severely damaging the Spring Creek High School and leaving a pronounced swth of tree damage in the Cliffs of the Neuse State Park. Another swath of tree damage was left in a forest off of Sutton Road Southeast. Just southwest of La Grange, the tornado blew away several houses at the intersection of Columbia Road and Little Wiggins Road. In one house, despite the garage being partially destroyed, a bicycle was left on its kickstand. Just to the northeast, several houses, mobile homes, and outbuildings were destroyed, and a car was hurled into a tree. The tornado weakened considerably as it veered eastwards into southern La Grange, where 30 houses were damaged and an apartment building sustained roof & wall damage. The tornado dissipated immediately after leaving La Grange. Although official data does not recognize any fatalities from this tornado, local newspaper reports corroborate that two people were killed in Lenoir County, and a witness recalled seeing a car hurled into a tree with multiple fatalities inside in La Grange. 81 people were injured.						
F4	SE of Wheat Swamp to Ayden to Greenville area to NE of Pactolus	Wayne, Lenoir, Greene, Pitt	NC	35.18°N 78.07°W	01:45–02:20	38 mi (61 km) (Storm Data), 46 miles (74 km) (NCEI)	1,407 yd (1,287 m; 0.799 mi)
F4	16 deaths – See section on this tornado – Deadliest tornado of the outbreak, year of 1984, and deadliest in North Carolina since 1884. The worst damage occurred in Scuffleton in Greene County, and additional damage ranging from F2–F3 was seen in much of Pitt County, including Ayden and the Greenville suburbs, including Winterville. 153 people were injured.						
F3	SW of Lewiston Woodville to S of Aulander	Bertie	NC	36.13°N 77.20°W	01:55	6 mi (9.7 km)	880 yd (800 m)
F3	A tornado passed from southwest of Lewiston Woodville to northeast of town along an arc-shaped path. A mobile home park was obliterated on the northern side of town at F3 intensity, killing six people; five were from the same family. Nineteen people were injured.						
F2	ESE of Aulander to E of Ahoskie	Bertie, Hertford	NC	36.23°N 77.00°W	02:10–02:15	5 mi (8.0 km)	527 yd (482 m)
F2	A tornado formed and damaged a house southeast of Aulander before passing southeast of Ahoskie, where it flattened several mobile homes in a mobile home park and damaged nearby houses. In the Bear Swamp area, the tornado felled so many trees that it interfered with the area's natural water flow. Seven people were injured.						
F1	Harrellsville area	Hertford	NC	36.33°N 76.80°W	02:17	1 mi (1.6 km)	177 yd (162 m)
F1	A brief, weak tornado caused minor damage near Harrellsville.						
F2	WNW of Loris, SC to E of Tabor City, NC	Horry (SC), Columbus (NC)	SC, NC	34.05°N 78.98°W	02:35–02:45	9 mi (14 km)	353 yd (323 m)
F2	A tornado formed near Loris in South Carolina, destroying two mobile homes, damaging another house, and producing notable tree damage before crossing into North Carolina, where it injured two people and caused considerable utility and building damage just east of Tabor City before dissipating. Eight people were injured.						
F3	SW of Carter to E of Acorn Hill	Gates	NC	36.37°N 76.70°W	02:30	14 mi (23 km)	880 yd (800 m)
F3	2 deaths – A tornado formed near the Chowan River and produced tree damage through swampland before destroying the Old Carter House and leveling a historic plantation built in 1800 near Carter, along with a "solid brick" home. Along NC 37, several houses were damaged or destroyed, one left with noting but its bathroom. A father and son died here when their house was destroyed. The tornado then continued eastwards through the Acorn Hill area, felling a grove of cedar trees and damaging several houses. The tornado left a swath of felled trees eastwards through the Great Dismal Swamp National Wildlife Refuge just before dissipating. The tornado may have continued into Pasquotank County, although official data does not confirm this. Ten people were injured.						
F2	SE of Edenton to Snug Harbor to S of Woodville	Chowan, Perquimans	NC	36.07°N 76.58°W	03:15–03:20	6 mi (9.7 km)	177 yd (162 m)
F2	1 death – The final confirmed tornado of the outbreak began as a waterspout over the Albemarle Sound before making landfall near Nixons Beach, damaging a house. Entering Perquimans County, the tornado struck Snug Harbor, where one person died and another was injured when a tree fell into a mobile home. The tornado then crossed the Perquimans River and spared several houses near White Hat Landing before striking and severely damaging a warehouse. A grain bin was blown ¼ mile away, and nearby trees were snapped. The tornado dissipated shortly afterwards. One person was injured.						

=== Beaver Dam–Roseboro–Salemburg–Kitty Fork–Clinton, North Carolina ===
Beaver Dam–Roseboro–Salemburg, North Carolina
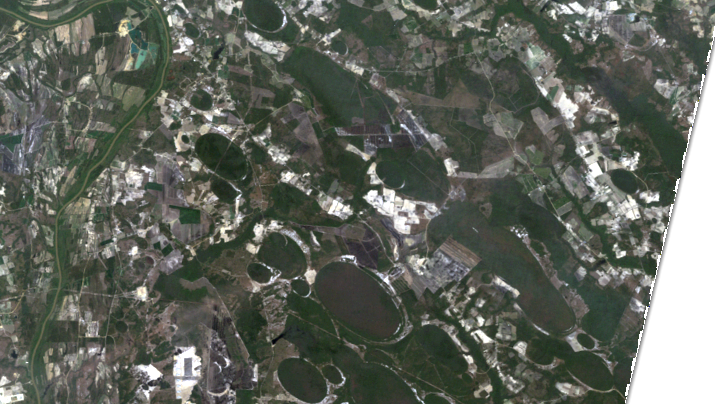
- The scar left by the Roseboro tornado (bottom left to top right) as seen on April 12, 1984.

Meteorological history
- Formed: March 28, 1984, ~7:40 p.m. EST (UTC−05:00)
- Dissipated: March 28, 1984, ~8:36 p.m. EST (UTC−05:00)
- Duration: ~46 minutes

F3 tornado
- on the Fujita scale
- Highest winds: 158–206 mph (254–332 km/h)

Overall effects
- Fatalities: 12
- Injuries: 101
- Damage: >$5,000,000 (1984 USD)

This long tracked, devastating tornado formed near the Robeson–Bladen county line at ~7:40 p.m. EST (UTC–05:00) as the previous tornado that struck Maxton and Red Springs neared dissipation. The tornado formed near Buies Neck as a weak tornado before passing through the Tobermory area, causing tree damage throughout the beginning of its path. Northeast of Tobermory, the tornado felled trees and destroyed several barns along Pages Lake Road. Crossing the Cape Fear River into the Big Swamp area of Cumberland County, the tornado began to rapidly intensify, producing noticeably more intense tree damage and striking several residences along Tabor Church Road. There, two brick houses were damaged, one so badly it was rendered unlivable. A double-wide mobile home was also swept a mile into the forest, a dump truck was destroyed, and the paint was sandblasted off of a car. By the time the tornado struck Cedar Creek Road, it was already one mile wide. One witness stated that several brick houses were destroyed and blown off of their foundations, and a large strip of the forest was flattened. A mobile home was also lofted here and sent flying over four miles away, landing near Polly Island Road as nothing but a metal frame. A house incurred F3 damage here. At Beaver Dam, the tornado was up to 1.3 miles wide. Along Troy Fisher Road, a well-built house was left with only one wall standing, and nearby trees were sandblasted, denuded, and debarked. A nearby trailer was also destroyed, and a car was blown ¾ mile and wrapped around a utility pole. Just to the northeast on Gip Road, another house was destroyed. A nearby house was demolished, and the frame of the aforementioned mobile home landed nearby.

Descending into Sampson County, the tornado passed west of Roseboro, causing severe tree damage. Along Route 210, the tornado destroyed a brick house before crossing Ruth Vinson Road. There, the tornado destroyed several houses & a trailer belonging to the same family, killing two people. One of the victims was advised to seek shelter in a nearby, sturdier house, but the tornado arrived before she could do so. Following the tornado, her cancelled check was found 18 miles away from her house in Kitty Fork, which would later be struck by the tornado. One person was injured on Hayne Stretch Road before the tornado crossed NC 24, destroying Boren Brick Co. Just to the northeast, the tornado twisted a brick house off of its foundation and destroyed a mobile home near Pleasant Union Baptist Church. At the intersection of Dunn Road and Old Salemburg Road, the tornado damaged two houses, one severely damaged. A mother and son lived in a trailer nearby that was destroyed by the storm & were both killed. A nearby turkey farm was completely obliterated. Thousands of turkeys, most alive, some dead, still gathered in the desolation where it stood following the tornado.

Damage to a home near Salemburg.

Moving through the southeastern fringes of Salemburg, the tornado destroyed the houses of two people along Laurel Lake Road, killing another person nearby. A house was damaged on The Avenue, and trees were uprooted just to the northeast before the tornado intensified again as it approached Keener. Along Belvoir School Road, the storm took only about a minute to pass through as the tornado destroyed a house. Inside, a mother, daughter, daughter-in-law, and grandson huddled in the bathrub. All survived. 21 outbuildings nearby were leveled, and another house had its attic ripped away and its windows blown out. Several houses and mobile homes were destroyed along US 421 as the tornado struck a mobile home park. The tornado crossed Great Coharie Creek before striking several houses along Basstown Road, completely destroying several. Houses were destroyed and trees were uprooted along Grady Road before the tornado struck along Hargrove Road, killing a husband, wife, and his grandson at the end of paved road 1830. Immediately south of Keener in the US 701 area, the tornado destroyed one house, swept another away, and reduced a store to its concrete foundation. The Reverend of the nearby Plainview Church was also killed. Along Shipp Road, several houses saw varying degrees of destruction. Now nearing dissipation, the tornado veered eastwards towards a developing circulation, causing intense tree damage before striking several houses south of McCullen, partially destroying one house and completely destroying two others. The final documented structural damage from the tornado occurred along N.N. Ellis Road, where a house was destroyed along with several outbuildings at a farm. The tornado dissipated as the Mt. Olive tornado formed, having tracked 41 miles. Killing 12 people, with a further 101 injuries, this tornado was the second deadliest of the outbreak, and one of the deadliest on record in North Carolina. Property damage exceeded $5 million (1984 USD).

=== Ayden–Winterville–Greenville–Pactolus, North Carolina ===
Ayden–Winterville–Greenville–Pactolus, North Carolina
- The ruins of a mobile home park in Ayden after the tornado.

Meteorological history
- Formed: March 28, 1984, ~8:44 p.m. EST (UTC−05:00)
- Dissipated: March 28, 1984, 9:28 p.m. EST (UTC−05:00)
- Duration: ~36+ minutes

F4 tornado
- on the Fujita scale
- Highest winds: 207–260 mph (333–418 km/h)

Overall effects
- Fatalities: 16
- Injuries: 153
- Damage: >$5,000,000 (1984 USD)

The deadliest tornado of the outbreak (and the year of 1984) began at ~8:44 p.m. EST (UTC–05:00) near the Wayne–Lenoir county border in Greene County shortly after the La Grange tornado dissipated, first causing minor tree damage near Pauls Path Road before moving northeastwards and intensifying as it approached Wheat Swamp. At the intersection of Collie Road and Ben Dail Road, a house was partially destroyed. Just to the northeast, a house was destroyed along with a new trailer and a nearby machine shop. The North Lenoir High School in Wheat Swamp sustained damage, and a nearby house was unroofed. The highest concentration of fatalities from the tornado occurred along Grays Mill Road northeast of Wheat Swamp. Several trees were mowed down at the western extent of the damage, and four people died in mobile homes, three of them children in a single one. Several mobile homes and houses were destroyed along Grays Mill Road. Along Linwood Sugg Road, several brick houses were damaged or destroyed, along with a pickup truck; the tornado struck here at 8:58 p.m. Just to the east, six more fatalities occurred. A mother, daughter, and granddaughter were all killed while walking from their mobile home to a brick house–the tornado, moving at upwards of 60 miles per hour (97 km/h), arrived much too fast. Nearby, a wife, daughter, and grandson all died in a trailer. Several houses nearby were damaged or destroyed. At the intersection of NC 58 and Franklin Jones Road, more houses were destroyed. Just to the northeast, the tornado produced intense tree damage and destroyed a house, several barns, and slid a tractor 15 feet on Mike Stocks Road. Intense tree damage again occurred south and east of the Hookerton area, where it fluctuated between F2 and F3 intensity. Just before entering Pitt County, the tornado devastated Scuffleton. In the words of a local newspaper, it was “almost completely obliterated”. Per Fujita, the tornado also reached F4 intensity here. In Greene County, a total of 75-100 houses were damaged or destroyed.

Entering Pitt County at 9:08 p.m., the tornado weakened to F2 intensity, which it would remain at for the majority of its time in the county, as it moved through the northern side of Ayden, where it produced “considerable” damage and killed two more people. In a mobile home park, a dozen mobile homes were destroyed, with one mobile home being reduced to a twisted frame and carried 50 feet away. In the Winterville area, another person died. Passing through the southeastern suburbs of Greenville, the tornado struck a mobile home, reducing it to the frame and throwing it 50 feet to a pond on the property. One occupant was killed, along with her two cats. Just to the northeast, several more houses and businesses were destroyed in the vicinity of the Eastern Pines Fire Department. Six more people were killed and ~50 were injured in the Eastern Pines area. Intense tree damage occurred off of Maple Ridge Road as the tornado abruptly shifted east into Simpsonville, where it tore the front of a two story house clean off and unroofed several more houses in the area. Exiting Simpsonville, the tornado felled a large swath of trees and caused significant tree damage on either side of NC 33. Near the end of its path, the tornado destroyed six more houses as it passed east of Pactolus. The tornado crossed Shepperd Mill Road at 9:25 p.m., blowing away a house, pack house, storage barn, and several tobacco barns, dissipating shortly thereafter at 9:28 p.m. west of Old Ford. With 16 fatalities and 153 more injuries, it was the single deadliest tornado of the outbreak and the entire year of 1984, and ranks among North Carolina’s deadliest today. Property damage exceeded $5 million (1984 USD).

== Aftermath ==
=== Summary ===
With a total of 24 confirmed tornadoes, and several possible undocumented tornadoes as found by Jonathan D. Finch, this tornado outbreak, at the time, held the record for the most tornadoes seen within a single day in the Carolinas, and remains of the deadliest and most destructive tornado outbreaks seen within the region. The outbreak was described as "staggering and perhaps unprecedented" for the Carolinas by the National Weather Service in Wilmington, North Carolina, having produced 11 tornadoes each in South Carolina & North Carolina, of which seven were rated F4 and five F3.

For the area in which this tornado outbreak occurred in, it was extremely unusual. Dr. Ted Fujita, who surveyed the outbreak, remarked that he had never seen anything like it on the East Coast. Several researchers, including Grazulis, noted that the tornado outbreak developed and continued near the center of a low pressure area. One powerful supercell produced 13 tornadoes from South Carolina to North Carolina, of which ten produced F3–F4 damage, often connected by downbursts. The resulting tornado family was, in totality, among the longest on record, with a combined length of ~250 miles (400 km). This drew comparisons to the 1925 Tri-State tornado, which also tracked near the center of a low pressure area and had an extremely long path length.

The storm system which produced this tornado outbreak also caused widespread effects across the Northeastern United States and New England. On Thursday, March 29, the Baltimore–Washington International Airport recorded a new record low-pressure for the month of March at 976.05 millibars, and high winds produced gusts of 95 miles per hour (153 km/h) and 108 miles per hour (174 km/h) at the Blue Hill Observatory near Boston, Massachusetts A downburst in Southborough, Massachusetts felled several acres of red pine trees, and heavy snowfall also occurred in the mountains of Pennsylvania and New York, with sleet and ice encompassing a larger area of the Northeast. Coastal erosion and flooding also occurred along the eastern seaboard.

=== Casualties ===
Outbreak death toll
State	Total	County	County total
North Carolina	44	Bertie	6
North Carolina	44	Cumberland	2
North Carolina	44	Gates	2
North Carolina	44	Greene	7
North Carolina	44	Lenoir	2
North Carolina	44	Perquimans	1
North Carolina	44	Pitt	9
North Carolina	44	Robeson	2
North Carolina	44	Sampson	10
North Carolina	44	Wayne	3
South Carolina	17	Fairfield	5
South Carolina	17	Greenville	1
South Carolina	17	Marlboro	9
South Carolina	17	Newberry	1
Total	60		
At least 57 deaths were tornado related

Official data states that this tornado outbreak was directly responsible for 57 fatalities, although newspapers and local reports indicate a death toll possibly up to 60. Of 57 confirmed fatalities, 42 occurred in North Carolina, and 16 occurred in South Carolina. An additional 1,248 people were injured, 799 in North Carolina, 448 in South Carolina, and one in Georgia. Non-tornadic thunderstorms caused four additional fatalities in Maryland and Pennsylvania. This tornado outbreak remains one of the deadliest events in the Carolinas & North Carolina, though when considering South Carolina alone, the April 1924 tornado outbreak remains significantly deadlier. Of all 57 confirmed fatalities attributed to the outbreak, 21 of them (37%) occurred in mobile homes. The high concentration of frail housing in the areas struck by the tornadoes, accompanied by their largely nocturnal nature and fast movement speed, likely aided in the high casualty rate.

=== Damages ===
The damage produced by these tornadoes was extensive and widespread, with hundreds of houses, businesses, and public buildings damaged or destroyed. Wind damage was reported as far north as Pennsylvania, with several cities in Georgia, the Carolinas, Virginia, Maryland, Delaware, and Pennsylvania reporting wind and hail damage. Particularly hard hit were Bennettsville, Maxton, Red Springs, Mount Olive, and Greenville, among many other smaller communities. The mayor of Red Springs stated that the storms caused $2.5 million (1984 USD) in damages there alone. WRAL-TV stated that the damages from the event reached $578 million (1984 USD) in totality.

== See also ==
- List of tornado outbreaks
  - List of North American tornadoes and tornado outbreaks
- List of Storm Prediction Center high risk days
- Enigma tornado outbreak – previously the worst tornado outbreak to strike the Carolinas
- Tornado outbreak of April 14–16, 2011 – most impactful tornado outbreak to affect the Carolinas since March 28, 1984, particularly North Carolina
- 2011 Super Outbreak – featured the deadliest single day for tornadoes issued a high risk by the Storm Prediction Center since March 28, 1984
- 1925 Tri-State tornado – drew comparisons to a tornado family in the March 28, 1984 tornado outbreak due to its longevity and location near the center of a low-pressure area
