= Clarks Grove Cooperative Creamery =

- U.S. National Register of Historic Places
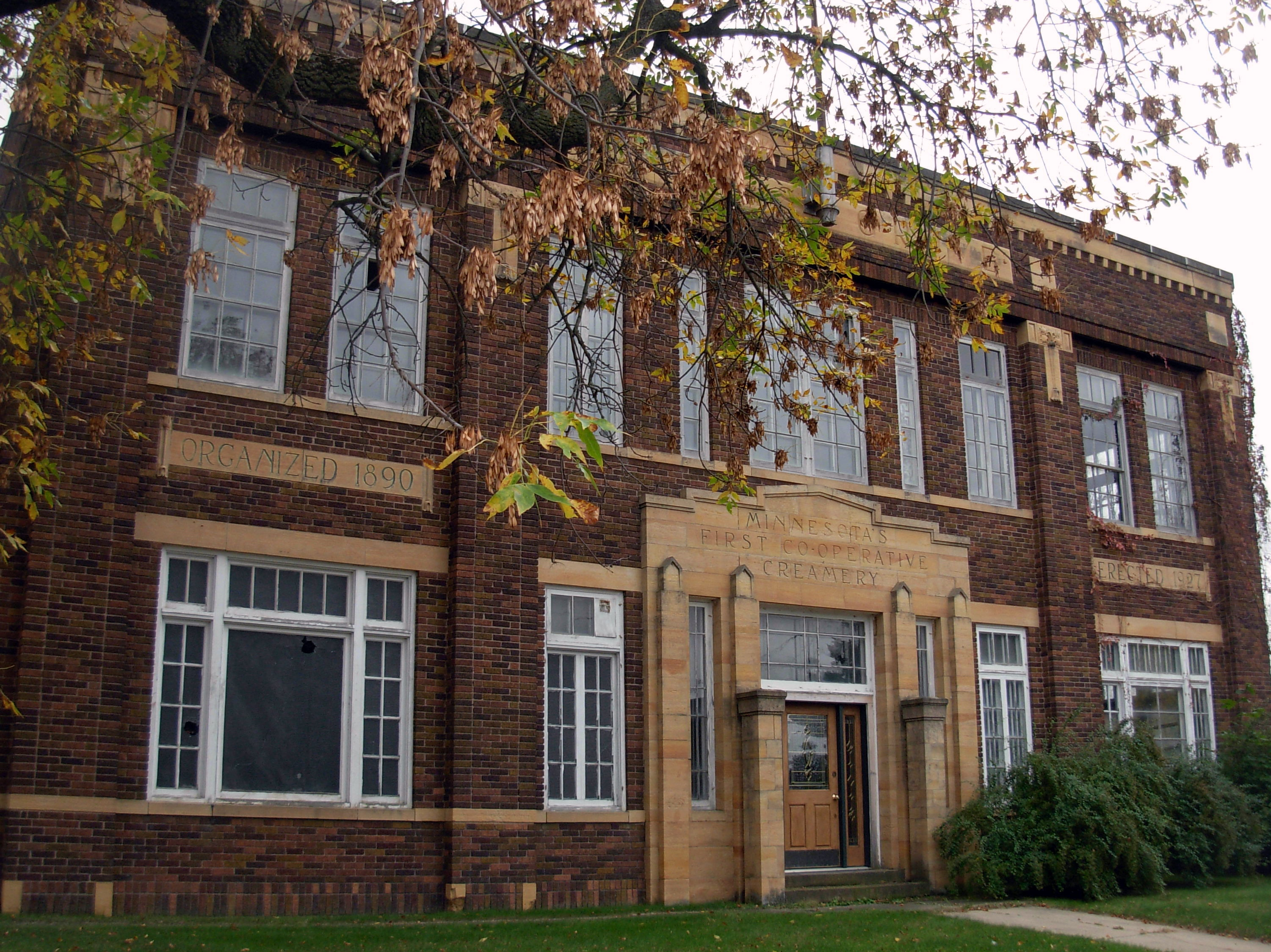
- The 1927 Clarks Grove Cooperative Creamery from the northeast

- Location within Minnesota Location within the United States
- Location: Main Street East & Independence Avenue, Clarks Grove, Minnesota
- Coordinates: 43°45′49″N 93°19′44″W
- Area: Less than one acre
- Built: 1927
- Built by: James Nelson
- Architect: Carl H. Buetow and C. Kampfer
- NRHP reference No.: 86000480
- Designated: March 20, 1986

The Clarks Grove Cooperative Creamery is a historic creamery in Clarks Grove, Minnesota, United States. It was established in 1890 as one of the first cooperative creameries in Minnesota. The Clarks Grove Cooperative Creamery used new technology and a well-organized cooperative system. It became a model for the Minnesota dairy industry. Ten years later, there were more than 550 cooperative creameries in the state.

The original building burned down and was replaced with a new facility in 1927 which included a second-floor meeting hall. Still standing, this building was listed on the National Register of Historic Places in 1986 for having local significance in the themes of agriculture, architecture, commerce, and social history. It was nominated for its seminal status and influence on the state's cooperative creameries, as well as its association with the small local community of Danish Americans and their outsized success in dairy farming, its role as a social center, and being Minnesota's best example of its type architecturally.

== Background ==
In the 1870s and 1880s, farmers in southern Minnesota were turning their wheat fields into dairy farms. Yet making butter on the farm was difficult. It required a lot of labor, mostly done by women. And many people did not like farm butter, because it took on the flavors of other food from the farmer's kitchen.

After an 1884 visit to Denmark, farmer Hans Peter Jensen came back to Minnesota with the idea for a cooperative creamery. In Denmark, Jensen learned about innovations in butter-making that could transform the dairy industry in Minnesota. But these new technologies would be difficult for individual farmers to access. Minnesota farmers typically owned only a dozen cows and small dairy farms were not very profitable.

Cooperatives, or "coops," helped by pooling farmers' resources. Farmers brought their milk to the coop. At the coop, butter was made in large batches using the new technology of cream separation. Cooperative farmers benefited from the efficiency of the factory, and they shared the profits and losses with each other rather than investors.

== Impact ==
The Clarks Grove Cooperative Creamery became a model for the rest of the state. It was made famous by Theophilus Levi (T.L.) Haecker. Haecker was a dairy science professor at the University of Minnesota, and he was known as the "Father of Minnesota Dairying."

In 1892, Haecker traveled around the state to inspect creameries. He was disappointed by the poor conditions that he found. But when Haecker found the Clarks Grove creamery, he was impressed. He spoke across the state and told farmers about the creamery's principles. In 1894, he published a popular bulletin that showed farmers how to found a cooperative creamery. The bulletin was based on the constitution and bylaws of the coop in Clarks Grove.

With Clarks Grove as a model, cooperative dairying in Minnesota grew. By 1898, more than 550 cooperative creameries existed in Minnesota. The state became known for its butter and for its cooperative agriculture system. In 1928, nearly half of the cooperative creameries in the United States were in Minnesota. These included important cooperative associations like the Minnesota Co-Operative Dairies Association (founded in 1911) and Land O'Lakes, Incorporated (founded in 1921).

The Clarks Grove creamery was also important for the local area. It was the first building and the first business in the Clarks Grove community. In the early 20th century the cooperative expanded, adding a cooperative grain elevator, a general store, and a lumber yard. For decades the creamery was a community center. It hosted talks, meetings, and school recitals. In 1956 it became a temporary school after the local schoolhouse burned down.

== Closure ==
In 1996 the Clarks Grove Cooperative Creamery closed. As dairy farmers retired there was no longer a need for the coop.

== See also ==
- National Register of Historic Places listings in Freeborn County, Minnesota
