= Pickerel Lake Township, Freeborn County, Minnesota =

Township in Minnesota, United States

Pickerel Lake Township
- Township
- Location within the state of Minnesota Pickerel Lake Township (the United States)
- Coordinates: 43°38′22″N 93°27′34″W
- Country: United States
- State: Minnesota
- County: Freeborn

Area
  - Total: 35.6 sq mi (92.3 km^{2})
  - Land: 34.7 sq mi (90.0 km^{2})
  - Water: 0.89 sq mi (2.3 km^{2})
- Elevation: 1,329 ft (405 m)

Population (2000)
  - Total: 746
  - Density: 21/sq mi (8.3/km^{2})
- Time zone: UTC-6 (Central (CST))
  - Summer (DST): UTC-5 (CDT)
- FIPS code: 27-50722
- GNIS feature ID: 0665291

Pickerel Lake Township is a township in Freeborn County, Minnesota, United States. The population was 746 at the 2000 census.

== History ==
Pickerel Lake Township was organized in 1865, and took its name from the Pickerel Lake. Rudolph Hanson (1903-2002), Minnesota lawyer and politician, was born in Pickerel Lake Township.

== Geography ==
According to the United States Census Bureau, the township has a total area of 35.6 square miles (92.3 km^{2}), of which 34.8 square miles (90.0 km^{2}) is land and 0.9 square mile (2.3 km^{2}) (2.50%) is water.

== Demographics ==
As of the census of 2000, there were 746 people, 266 households, and 221 families residing in the township. The population density was 21.5 people per square mile (8.3/km^{2}). There were 273 housing units at an average density of 7.9/sq mi (3.0/km^{2}). The racial makeup of the township was 98.26% White, 0.13% Native American, 0.54% from other races, and 1.07% from two or more races. Hispanic or Latino of any race were 2.28% of the population.

There were 266 households, out of which 37.2% had children under the age of 18 living with them, 75.2% were married couples living together, 3.4% had a female householder with no husband present, and 16.9% were non-families. 13.2% of all households were made up of individuals, and 5.3% had someone living alone who was 65 years of age or older. The average household size was 2.80 and the average family size was 3.08.

In the township the population was spread out, with 26.8% under the age of 18, 6.8% from 18 to 24, 27.7% from 25 to 44, 28.3% from 45 to 64, and 10.3% who were 65 years of age or older. The median age was 39 years. For every 100 females, there were 104.4 males. For every 100 females age 18 and over, there were 103.7 males.

The median income for a household in the township was $54,063, and the median income for a family was $57,031. Males had a median income of $36,375 versus $26,667 for females. The per capita income for the township was $26,346. About 4.1% of families and 3.3% of the population were below the poverty line, including 3.0% of those under age 18 and 7.5% of those age 65 or over.
