= Omaha Road Bridge Number 15 =

Omaha Road Bridge #15
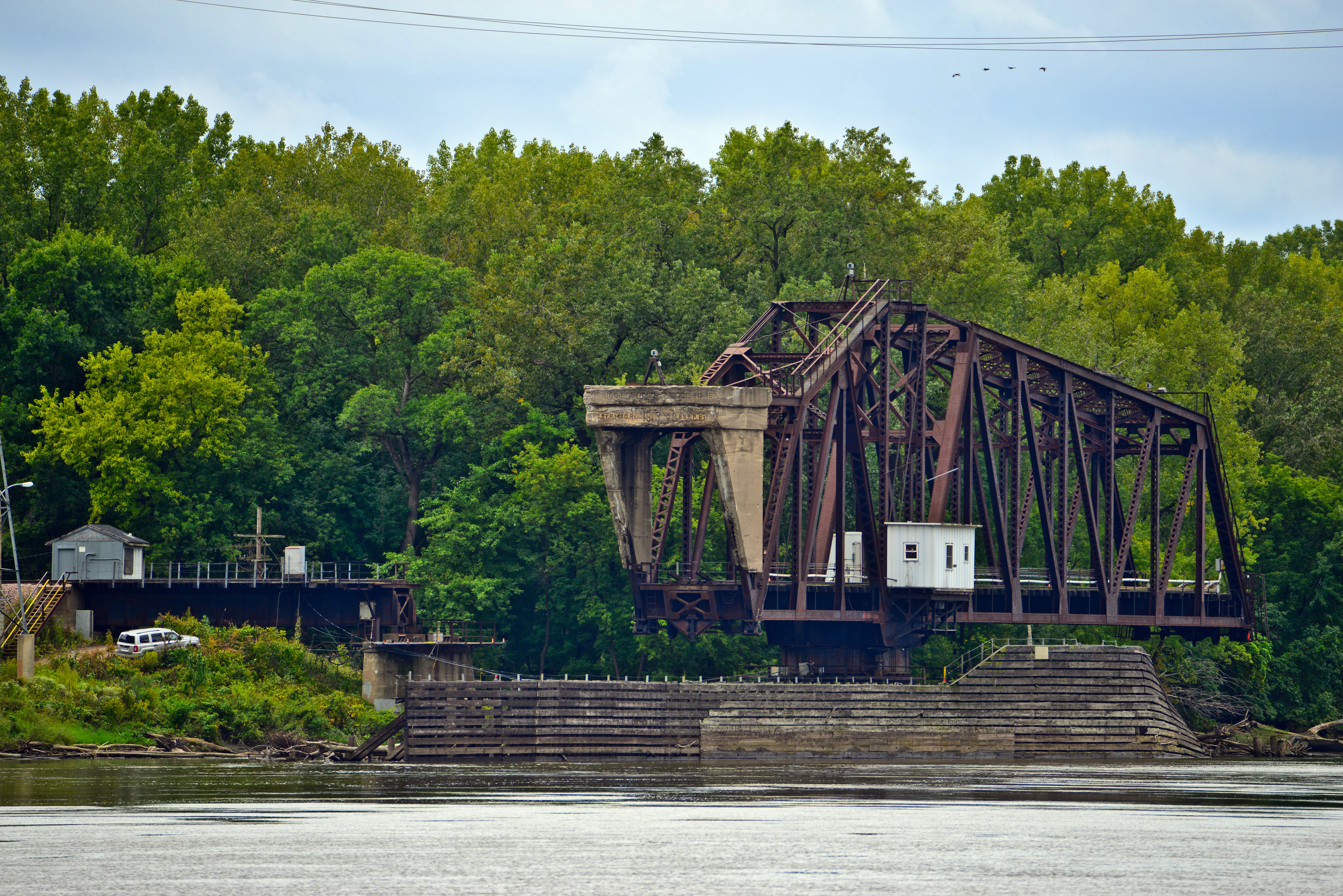
- The south end of the bridge, showing the concrete "bobtail".
- Coordinates: 44°55′24″N 93°07′02″W
- Carries: One track of the Union Pacific Railroad and Soo Line Railroad
- Crosses: Mississippi River
- Locale: St. Paul, Minnesota
- Maintained by: Union Pacific Railroad
- ID number: 15

Characteristics
- Design: Swing bridge
- Total length: 1,055 feet (322 m)
- Width: One track
- Longest span: 185 feet (56 m)
- Clearance below: 22 feet (6.7 m)

History
- Opened: 1916

Location
- Interactive map of Omaha Road Bridge #15

Omaha Road Bridge Number 15 is a swing bridge that spans the Mississippi River in St. Paul, Minnesota, United States. It was built in 1915 by the Chicago, St. Paul, Minneapolis and Omaha Railway (Omaha Road), though it, and the line from St. Paul to Mendota, was jointly owned with the Chicago, Milwaukee and St. Paul Railway (Milwaukee Road). The causeway curves around Pickerel Lake in Lilydale, Minnesota, before crossing into St. Paul.

The bridge was designed by I.F. Stern of Chicago. It is unusually shaped, because the swing span is asymmetrical. According to local legend, the original bridge design had equal length spans on either side of the center pivot. Once the bridge was completed, the owner of the property on the south side of the river did not want the swing span crossing his land. In response, the owner removed most of the south end of the swing span and added a concrete counterweight to compensate for the lost material.

Legends aside, the reason for the "bobtail" configuration of the bridge is that the section of the river deep enough for navigation at that point is not wide enough to accommodate a full-sized swing bridge. The counterweight is necessary to keep both ends of the bridge in balance over the center pier, which is near the right descending bank. While the legend may be an appealing one, it cannot withstand the fact that no qualified bridge engineer would lavish the material and effort required to build a swing span over land.

The bridge forces barge traffic heading up river to cross over to their respective port (south) shore of the river, while those heading downstream are able to maintain their normal traffic pattern.

An earlier bridge in this location, built in 1869, was a wooden Howe truss design. This was one of the original 15 bridges spanning the Mississippi River. The first bridge was an 8-span drawbridge, but much of the superstructure had to be replaced in 1877 because of decay in the original pine chords. It was a joint bridge of the Minnesota Valley Railroad Company (predecessor of the Omaha Road) and the Minnesota Central Railroad Company (predecessor of the Milwaukee Road)

== See also ==
- List of crossings of the Upper Mississippi River

== Bibliography ==
- Mailer, Stan (2004). The Omaha Road: Chicago, St. Paul, Minneapolis & Omaha. Mukilteo, Washington: Hundman Publishing. ISBN 0-945434-04-9. OL 8448884M.
