= Tornadoes of 1984 =

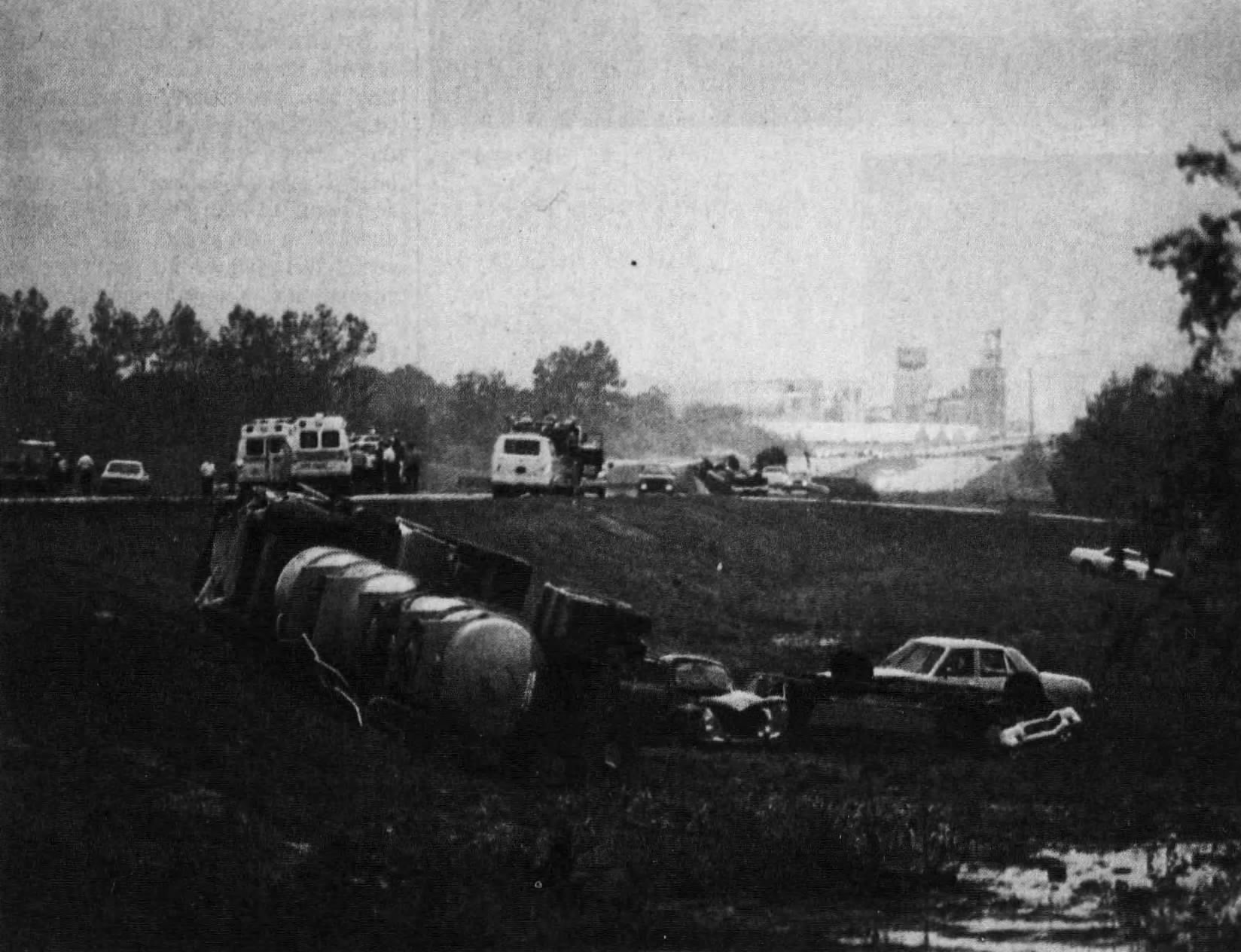
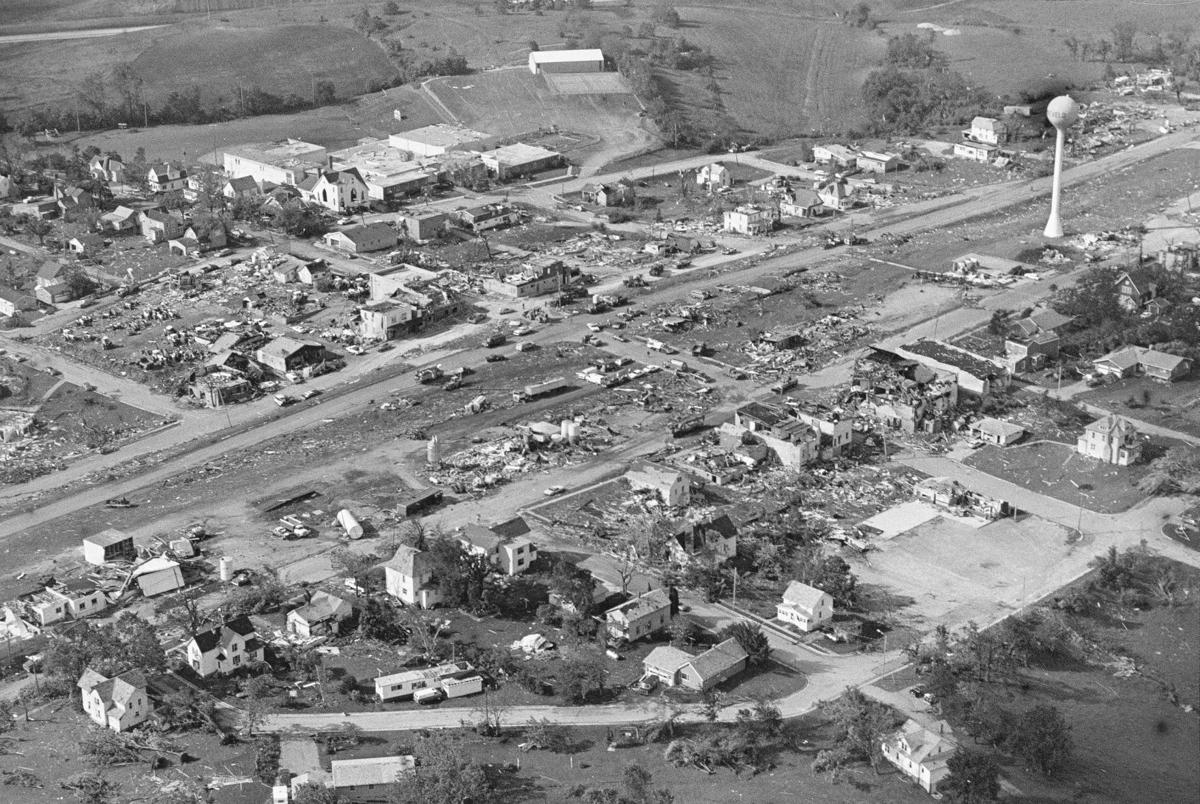
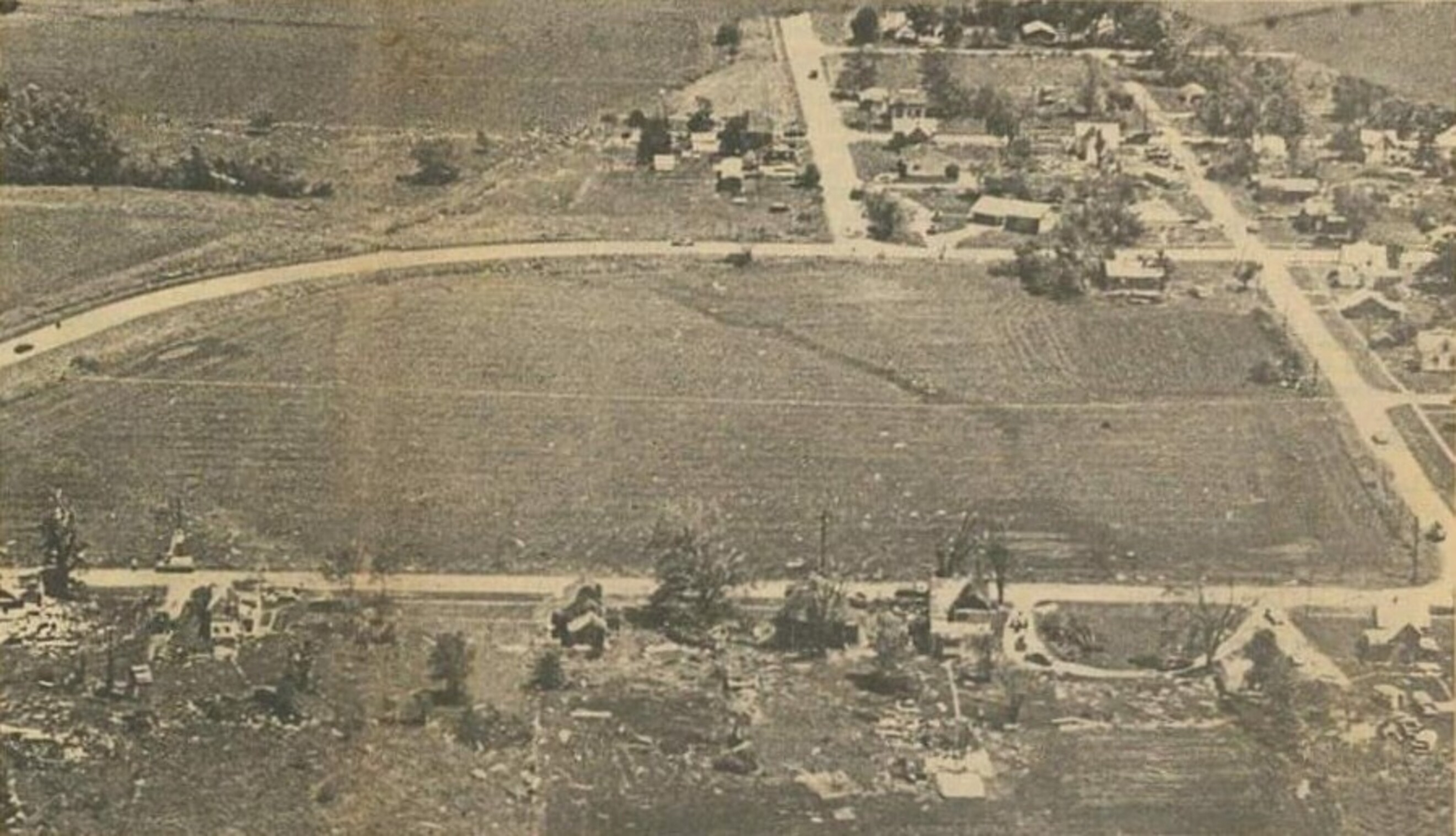
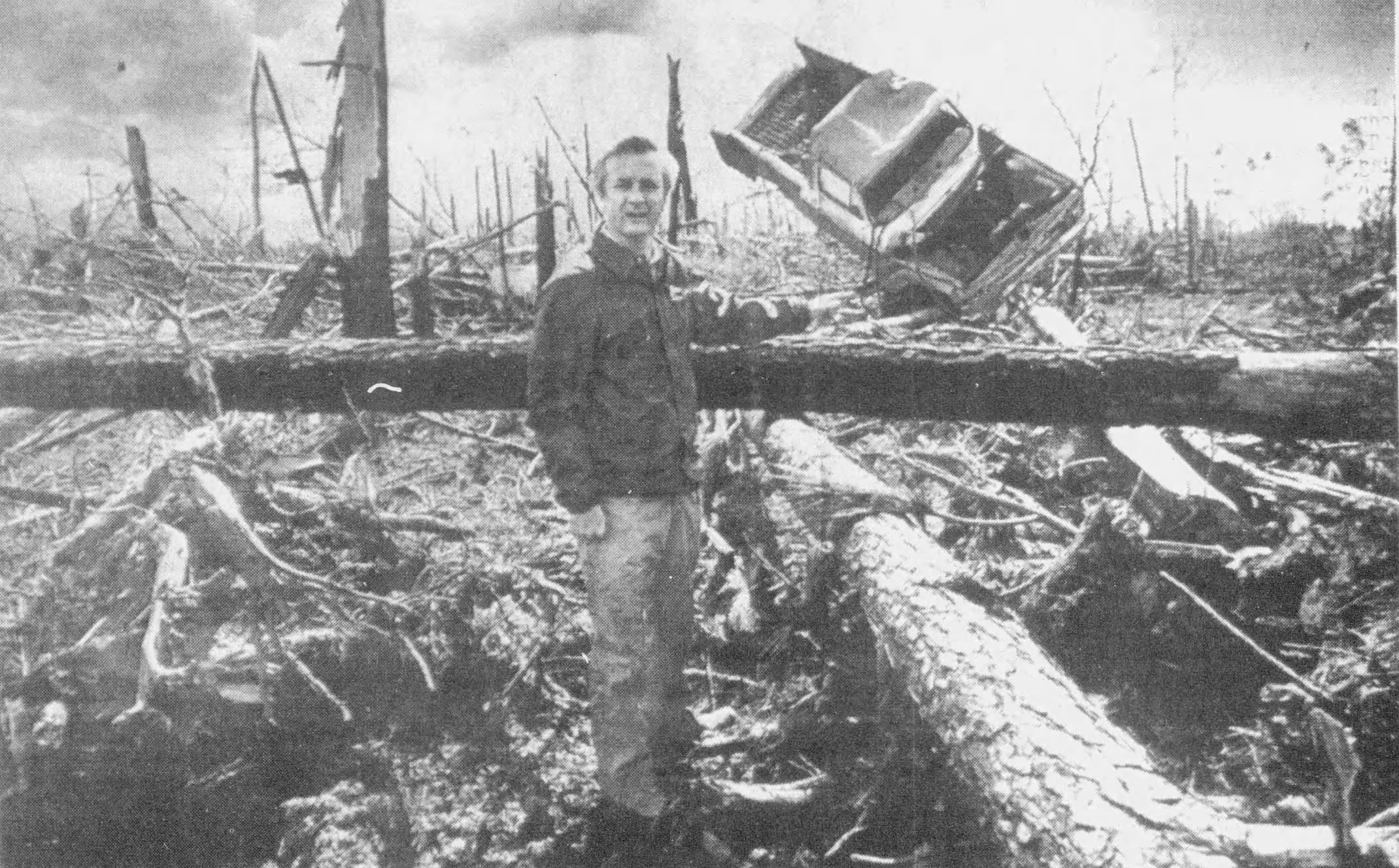
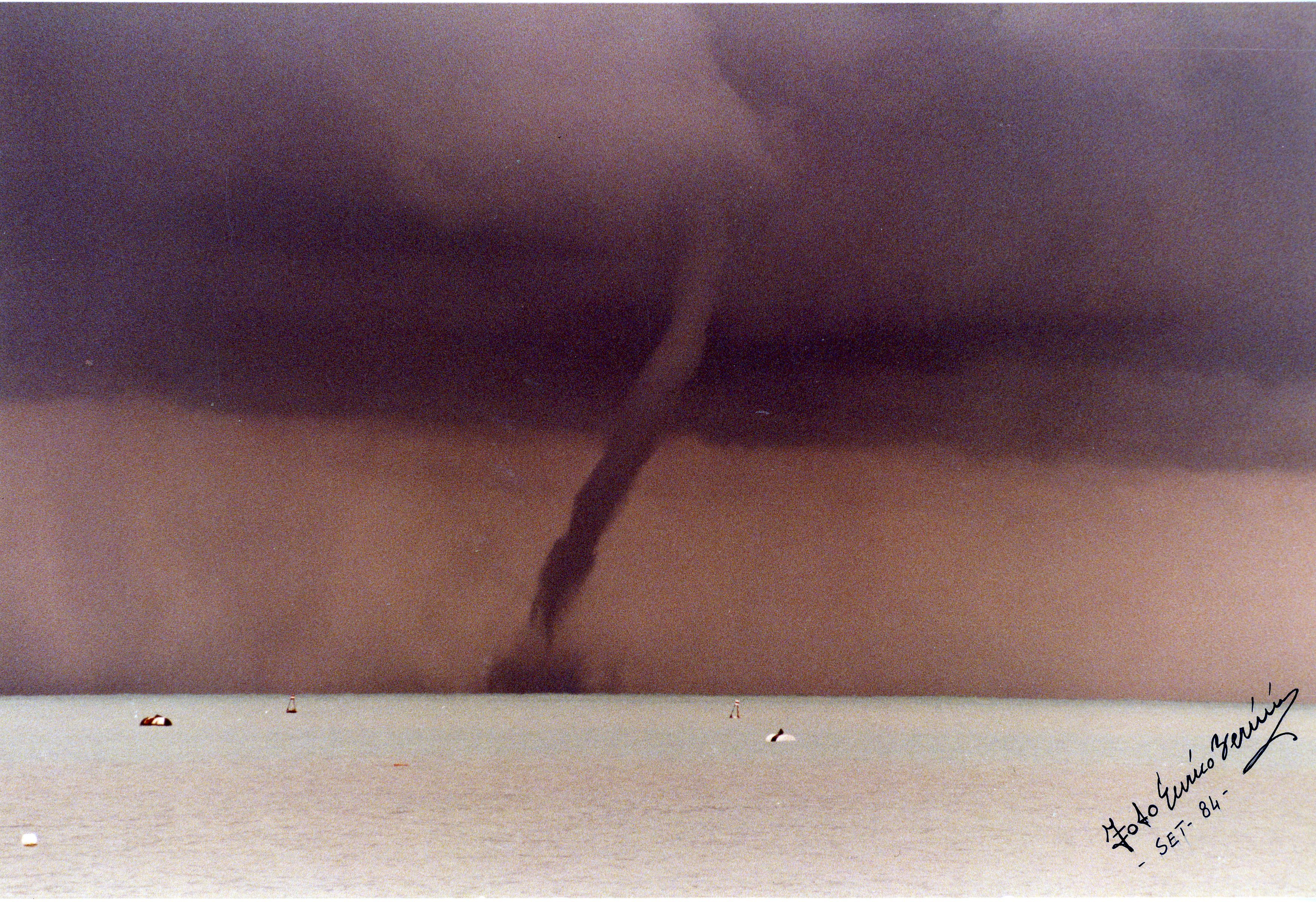
- Clockwise from top: A thin but violent F4 tornado near Delafield, Wisconsin on April 27; An aerial photo of Barneveld, Wisconsin following an F5 tornado on June 8; Former Lieutenant Governor Jim Hunt surveying damage near Faison, North Carolina following an F4 tornado on March 28; A waterspout near Vada, Rosignano Marittimo; An aerial photo of Delta, Iowa following a high-end F4 tornado on June 7; A tanker truck that was thrown 100 yards off a highway in Montgomery, Alabama following an F3 tornado on May 3.
- Timespan: January–December 1984
- Maximum rated tornado: F5 tornado: Barneveld, Wisconsin on June 8
- Tornadoes in U.S.: 907
- Damage (U.S.): >$618 million
- Fatalities (U.S.): 122
- Fatalities (worldwide): 182-525+

This page documents the tornadoes and tornado outbreaks of 1984, primarily in the United States. Most tornadoes form in the U.S., although some events may take place internationally. Tornado statistics for older years like this often appear significantly lower than modern years due to fewer reports or confirmed tornadoes.

== Synopsis ==
Fatal United States tornadoes in 1984
- Approximate touchdown location of killer tornadoes in 1984
Summary of tornadoes
- March 15 – Arkansas (2 deaths)
- March 15 – Arkansas (5 deaths)
- March 28 – South Carolina (1 death)
- March 28 – South Carolina (5 deaths)
- March 28 – South Carolina, North Carolina (7 deaths)
- March 28 – South Carolina, North Carolina (4 deaths)
- March 28 – North Carolina (12 deaths)
- March 28 – North Carolina (3 deaths)
- March 28 – North Carolina (16 deaths)
- March 28 – North Carolina (6 deaths)
- March 28 – North Carolina (2 deaths)
- March 28 – North Carolina (1 death)
- April 20 – Oklahoma (1 death)
- April 21 – Mississippi (15 deaths)
- April 26 – Minnesota (1 death)
- April 26 – Oklahoma (3 deaths)
- April 26 – Oklahoma (8 deaths)
- April 27 – Wisconsin (1 death)
- April 27 – Wisconsin (1 death)
- April 27 – Wisconsin (1 death)
- April 27 – Illinois (1 death)
- April 29 – Oklahoma (1 death)
- May 3 – Alabama (5 deaths)
- May 8 – Maryland, Delaware (1 death)
- June 5 – Texas (1 death)
- June 7 – Missouri, Iowa (3 deaths)
- June 7 – Iowa (1 death)
- June 7 – Wisconsin (9 deaths)
- October 16 – Tennessee (1 death)
- October 18 – Texas (1 death)
- October 18 – Missouri (1 death)
- October 31 – Kansas (1 death)
- November 9 – Missouri (1 death)
Total fatalities: 122

1984 was a very busy and deadly year for tornadoes. There were 907 tornadoes recorded, including 15 of F4 or greater strength, the most this powerful since 1976. A total of 122 people were killed in 1984, the most since 1974, and a mark that would not again be surpassed until 1998. The most notable tornado events included the deadly March 28 Carolinas outbreak and the killer F5 tornado which hit Barneveld, Wisconsin on June 8.

== Events ==
Confirmed tornado total for the entire year 1984 in the United States.

Confirmed tornadoes by Fujita rating
FU	F0	F1	F2	F3	F4	F5	Total
0	373	352	126	41	14	1	907

== January ==
There was 1 tornado confirmed in the US in January.

=== January 13 ===
The only tornado of the entire month was an F0 tornado that briefly touched down near Huntington Beach, California, causing $2,500 (1984 USD) in damage and no fatalities or injuries.

== February ==
There were 27 tornadoes confirmed in the US in February.

=== February 27 ===
A F3 tornado struck Mayo, Florida, injuring one person and causing $250,000 (1984 USD) in damage.

== March ==
There were 73 tornadoes confirmed in the US in March.

=== March 15 ===
FU	F0	F1	F2	F3	F4	F5
0	7	5	0	0	2	0

An F4 tornado in Arkansas killed five people as it impacted Clinton, Arkansas. A second F4 tornado in the state killed two more people.

=== March 28 ===
FU	F0	F1	F2	F3	F4	F5
0	1	4	7	5	7	0

The 1984 Carolinas tornado outbreak of March 28, 1984, was the most destructive tornado outbreak to sweep through the two states since the Enigma tornado outbreak struck 100 years and 1 month earlier, according to NOAA and NCDC public records. 24 tornadoes (seven of F4 strength) resulted in 57 fatalities and over one thousand injuries.

== April ==
There were 176 tornadoes confirmed in the US in April.

=== April 3 ===
An F3 tornado developed at the western edge of Craighead County, Arkansas near Otwell, Arkansas into Mississippi County where it dissipated near Blytheville, Arkansas. Locations impacted included Bay, Lunsford, Lake City, and Manila, Arkansas. This tornado crossed Arkansas highway 18 a total of four times over its 79 mile long track. This tornado caused two recorded injuries. A few other tornadoes from a group of supercells developing over the region from an intensifying storm system. Other tornadoes spawned across northeastern sections of Arkansas included an F0 near Waldenburg, Arkansas, to an F1 near Oil Trough, Arkansas, and an F3 tornado near Mc Crory, Arkansas, to Cherry Valley, Arkansas.

=== April 16 (Vietnam) ===
A devasting tornado struck areas west of the city of Hải Phòng in the early morning hours of April 16, 1984. The tornado first touchdown at 02:05 a.m local time over the urban district of An Dương, moving through western parts of the downtown before crossing the Cam River, impacting Hồng Bàng and Thủy Nguyên districts. The tornado damaged or destroyed over 324 homes, mostly brick and masonry house, knocking down 34 low and high-voltages power poles, destroying 2 substations, depositing debris far distances. Damages cumulated up to 150 million VND (1984), or 2.5 trillion VND (2026). After being on the ground for 10 minutes, it dissipated over Thủy Nguyên district, north of the city. It traveled for at least 8 km, with an average width of around 200-250m wide, albeit its maximum width was around 800m. It killed at least 43 people, injuring 109 other and left 9 missing, presumably dead.

=== April 21 ===
FU	F0	F1	F2	F3	F4	F5
0	0	4	1	2	3	0

An F3 tornado in Mississippi killed 16 people.

=== April 26–27 ===
On April 26, an F3 tornado in Okmulgee County, Oklahoma killed eight people. An even stronger F4 tornado killed three more people in Terlton, Oklahoma. One person was also killed by a tornado in Minnesota before more tornadoes on April 27 killed four in Wisconsin, including one from an F4 tornado that affected Milwaukee's western suburbs, and Illinois.

== May ==
There were 169 tornadoes confirmed in the US in May.

=== May 3 ===
A tornado outbreak spawned 38 tornadoes, including an F3 tornado that caused five fatalities and more than a dozen injuries in Alabama. A strong storm system continued sparking severe weather with a derecho pushing through eastern Arkansas into Tennessee, and northern Mississippi during the morning hours. This line of storms brought hurricane-force winds, large hail, flash flooding and isolated brief tornadoes to the region, however by midday the storm system intensified with the development of scattered supercell thunderstorms under a volatile airmass causing the tornado outbreak across portions of Alabama.

=== May 8 ===
Another tornado outbreak in the Mid-Atlantic produced several tornadoes, including a killer tornado on the Delmarva Peninsula, which claimed one life, caused six injuries and damaged a large chicken house in Dorchester County, Maryland (near Hurlock) before moving into Sussex County, Delaware injuring five more people and damaging a mobile home. Damage in Maryland was estimated between 500,000 and 5 million dollars.

== June ==
There were 242 tornadoes confirmed in the US in June.

=== June 7–8 ===
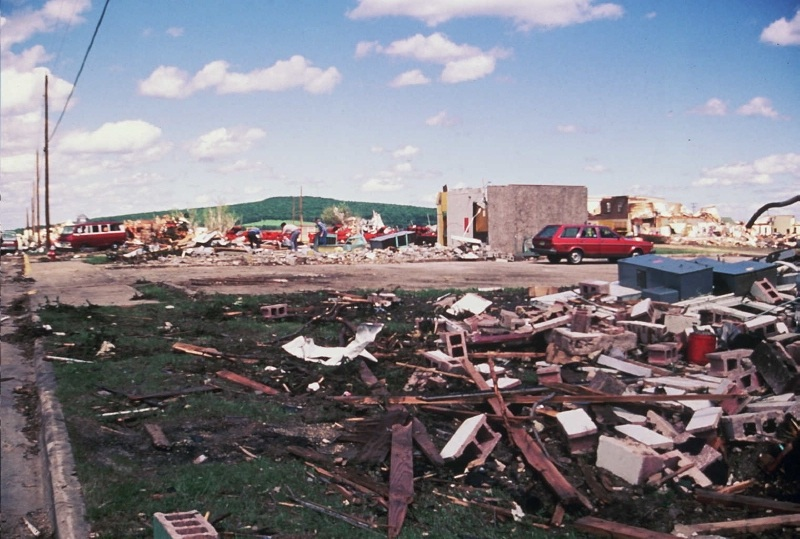
Damage from the Barneveld, Wisconsin F5 tornado.

FU	F0	F1	F2	F3	F4	F5
0	4	13	23	4	1	1

An extremely destructive tornado outbreak took place across the central United States from North Dakota to Kansas in early June. Several significant tornadoes touched down, including an F5 tornado which traveled through Barneveld, Wisconsin in the early morning hours of June 8. The entire outbreak killed at least 13 people across three states, nine of whom died in Barneveld alone.

=== June 9 (Soviet Union) ===
FU	F0	F1	F2	F3	F4	F5
0	1	1	3	1	1	0

A rare and destructive tornado outbreak took place in the Soviet Union, mainly impacting the Ivanovo and Yaroslavl regions located northeast of Moscow. One tornado, notoriously known as Ivanovo tornado produced F4 damage (previously rated F5), while another (possibly the same as the Ivanovo tornado) was rated as F4. The outbreak resulted in at least 75 fatalities, though some sources claim that the actual death toll surpasses 400. 804 people were injured by the tornadoes.

== July ==
There were 72 tornadoes confirmed in the US in July.

=== July 18 ===
An F2 tornado hit Sussex County, Delaware (near Greenwood) just two months after being hit by a tornado that caused a death in Maryland, but this tornado resulted in no fatalities or injuries. This was one of only two significant tornadoes to hit Sussex County.

== August ==
There were 47 tornadoes confirmed in the US in August.

=== August 8 ===
An F3 tornado hit Flint, Michigan without causing any fatalities or injuries.

== September ==
There were 17 tornadoes confirmed in the US in September.

=== September 2 ===
A F3 tornado impacted Sanilac County and St. Clair County, Michigan, injuring one person and causing $5 million (1984 USD) in damage.

== October ==
There were 49 tornadoes confirmed in the US in October.

=== October 16 ===
A small localized outbreak of tornadoes spawned in northeast Arkansas as a result of a strong storm system draped across the United States. Several brief tornadoes and massive hail were observed including one F1 tornado which formed near Lake City, Arkansas, to Black Oak, Arkansas. other brief tornadoes were all reported as F0 in the vicinities of Farrville, Arkansas, Monette, Arkansas., as well as near Newport, Arkansas, and Grubbs, Arkansas. Many locations from Bay, Arkansas, to Lake City, Arkansas., received extensive damage from baseball sized hail, to grapefruit size hail. ( 2.75" to 4.25" diameter hailstones). 2 injuries were reported during this event, one from an F1 tornado at Lake City, Arkansas. and hail inflicted injury in the same community.

=== October 31 ===
An F3 tornado hit Mutual, Oklahoma without causing any fatalities.

== November ==
There were 30 tornadoes confirmed in the US in November.

=== November 9 ===
A F2 tornado impacted the city of Potosi, Missouri, killing one person, injuring 15 others, and causing $25 million (1984 USD) in damage.

=== November 23 (Germany) ===
FU	F0	F1	F2	F3	F4	F5
1	0	1	1	0	0	0

Three tornadoes occurred in Germany, including a significant tornado, rated F2/T5 by the European Severe Storms Laboratory, that impacted Zöllnitz, Germany, injuring one person.

== December ==
There were 4 tornadoes confirmed in the US in December.

=== December 13 ===
A north-moving F3 tornado impacted the eastern portion of the Dallas–Fort Worth metroplex, injuring 28 people and causing $25 million (1984 USD) in damage.

== See also ==
- Tornado
  - Tornadoes by year
  - Tornado records
  - Tornado climatology
  - Tornado myths
- List of tornado outbreaks
  - List of F5 and EF5 tornadoes
  - List of North American tornadoes and tornado outbreaks
  - List of 21st-century Canadian tornadoes and tornado outbreaks
  - List of European tornadoes and tornado outbreaks
  - List of tornadoes and tornado outbreaks in Asia
  - List of Southern Hemisphere tornadoes and tornado outbreaks
  - List of tornadoes striking downtown areas
- Tornado intensity
  - Fujita scale
  - Enhanced Fujita scale
