= Rudolph Hanson =

American lawyer

Rudolph William Hanson (May 30, 1903 – October 12, 2002) was an American politician and lawyer.

Hanson was born on a farm in Pickerel Lake Township, Freeborn County, Minnesota, near Albert Lea, Minnesota. Hanson went to the public schools in Albert Lea. Hanson was involved with farming, teaching and the manufacturing of butter. He graduated from the University of Minnesota in 1935 and the University of Minnesota Law School in 1937. Hanson was admitted to the Minnesota bar and practiced law in Albert Lea. Hanson served in the United States Navy from 1942 to 1945 during World War II. Hanson served as Freeborn County Attorney from 1946 to 1954. Hanson then served in the Minnesota Senate from 1955 to 1970. Hanson died at his home in Albert Lea, Minnesota.
