= Clarks Grove, Minnesota =

City in Minnesota, United States

Clarks Grove
- City
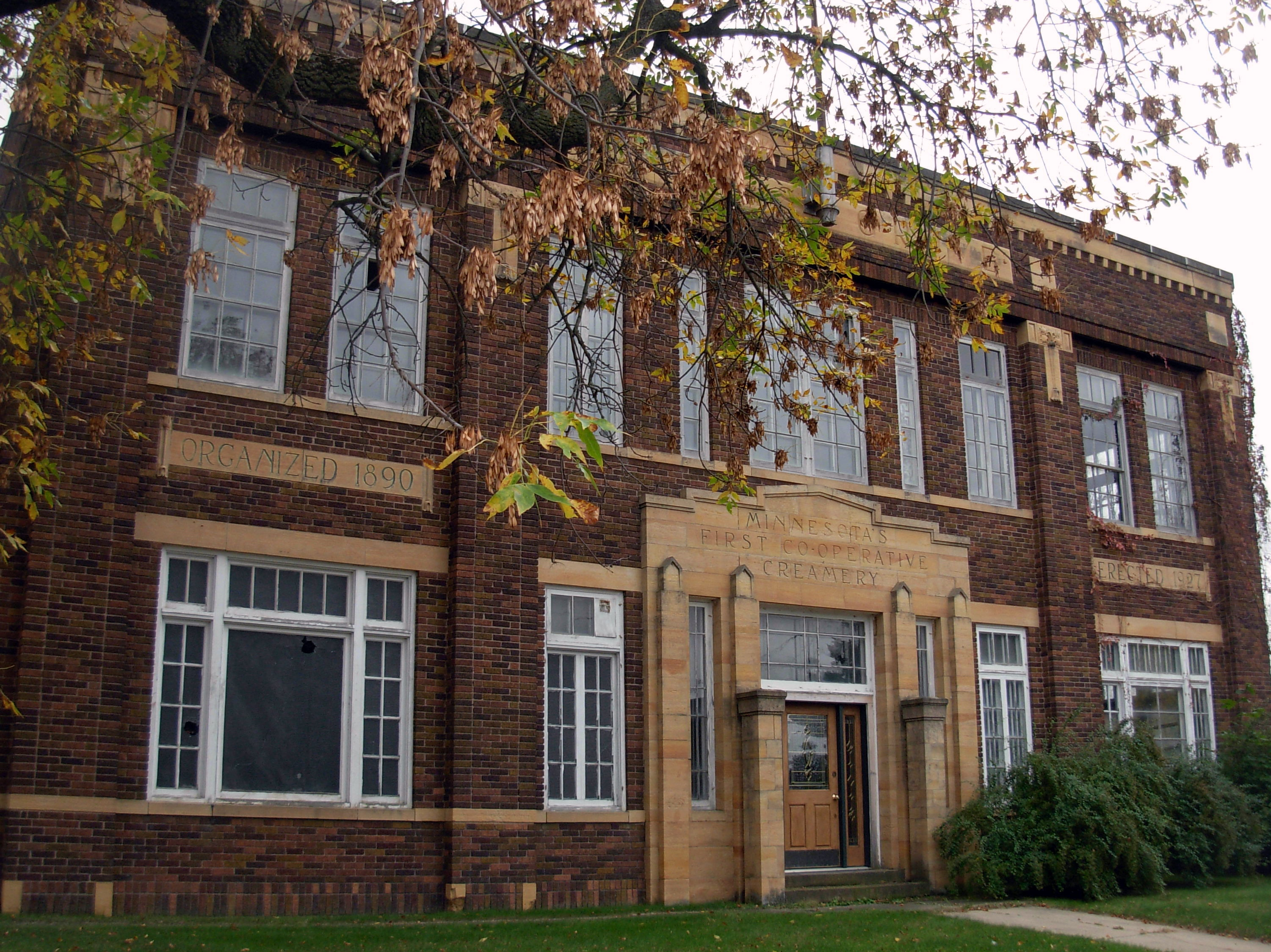
- Clarks Grove Cooperative Creamery building

- Location of Clarks Grove, Minnesota
- Coordinates: 43°45′42″N 93°19′43″W
- Country: United States
- State: Minnesota
- County: Freeborn

Area
  - Total: 0.64 sq mi (1.65 km^{2})
  - Land: 0.60 sq mi (1.55 km^{2})
  - Water: 0.039 sq mi (0.10 km^{2})
- Elevation: 1,303 ft (397 m)

Population (2020)
  - Total: 694
  - Density: 1,158.8/sq mi (447.41/km^{2})
- Time zone: UTC-6 (Central (CST))
  - Summer (DST): UTC-5 (CDT)
- ZIP code: 56016
- Area code: 507
- FIPS code: 27-11674
- GNIS feature ID: 2393539
- Website: https://cityofclarksgrovemn.com/

Clarks Grove is a city in Freeborn County, Minnesota, United States. As of the 2020 census, Clarks Grove had a population of 694.

== History ==
Clarks Grove was laid out in 1890, about ten years before the railroad was extended to that point. It was incorporated as a village on February 27, 1920, and had a station of the Chicago and Northwestern Railway, sometimes listed as James. Its post office began in 1857 with Clark as postmaster.

Clarks Grove Cooperative Creamery, founded in 1890 by Danish American farmers, was one of the first successful cooperative creameries in the state.

In March 2017, buildings in the community were damaged by a tornado.

== Geography ==
According to the United States Census Bureau, the city has an area of 0.59 square miles (1.53 km^{2}), of which 0.55 square miles (1.42 km^{2}) is land and 0.04 square miles (0.10 km^{2}) is water. Clarks Grove is along Interstate 35, State Highway 251 (MN 251), and County Roads 31 and 45.

== Demographics ==
Historical population
Census	Pop.	Note	%±
1930	180		—
1940	203		12.8%
1950	254		25.1%
1960	353		39.0%
1970	480		36.0%
1980	620		29.2%
1990	675		8.9%
2000	734		8.7%
2010	706		−3.8%
2020	694		−1.7%
U.S. Decennial Census

=== 2010 census ===
As of the census of 2010, there were 706 people, 295 households, and 197 families living in the city. The population density was 1,283.6 inhabitants per square mile (495.6/km^{2}). There were 312 housing units at an average density of 567.3 per square mile (219.0/km^{2}). The racial makeup of the city was 93.9% White, 0.6% African American, 0.4% Native American, 0.4% Asian, 2.4% from other races, and 2.3% from two or more races. Hispanic or Latino of any race were 6.8% of the population.

There were 295 households, of which 31.2% had children under the age of 18 living with them, 50.8% were married couples living together, 8.5% had a female householder with no husband present, 7.5% had a male householder with no wife present, and 33.2% were non-families. 28.5% of all households were made up of individuals, and 8.8% had someone living alone who was 65 years of age or older. The average household size was 2.39 and the average family size was 2.90.

The median age in the city was 38.1 years. 25.4% of residents were under the age of 18; 8.4% were between the ages of 18 and 24; 24.4% were from 25 to 44; 27.6% were from 45 to 64; and 14.3% were 65 years of age or older. The gender makeup of the city was 50.6% male and 49.4% female.

=== 2000 census ===
As of the census of 2000, there were 734 people, 283 households, and 206 families living in the city. The population density was 1,717.4 inhabitants per square mile (663.1/km^{2}). There were 296 housing units at an average density of 692.6 per square mile (267.4/km^{2}). The racial makeup of the city was 98.50% White, 0.27% Asian, 0.95% from other races, and 0.27% from two or more races. Hispanic or Latino of any race were 5.31% of the population.

There were 283 households, out of which 39.2% had children under the age of 18 living with them, 59.0% were married couples living together, 10.2% had a female householder with no husband present, and 27.2% were non-families. 24.0% of all households were made up of individuals, and 10.6% had someone living alone who was 65 years of age or older. The average household size was 2.59 and the average family size was 3.04.

In the city, the population was spread out, with 29.0% under the age of 18, 7.9% from 18 to 24, 29.6% from 25 to 44, 20.0% from 45 to 64, and 13.5% who were 65 years of age or older. The median age was 35 years. For every 100 females, there were 103.9 males. For every 100 females age 18 and over, there were 104.3 males.

The median income for a household in the city was $40,179, and the median income for a family was $47,000. Males had a median income of $33,542 versus $20,000 for females. The per capita income for the city was $16,491. About 3.6% of families and 6.7% of the population were below the poverty line, including 5.8% of those under age 18 and 7.7% of those age 65 or over.
