= Cash, South Carolina =

Settlement in South Carolina, United States

Cash
- Census-designated place
- Interactive map of Cash
- Coordinates: 34°37′11″N 79°53′22″W
- Country: United States
- State: South Carolina
- County: Chesterfield

Area
  - Total: 1.53 sq mi (3.95 km^{2})
  - Land: 1.53 sq mi (3.95 km^{2})
  - Water: 0 sq mi (0.00 km^{2})
- Elevation: 249 ft (76 m)

Population (2020)
  - Total: 445
  - Density: 292.0/sq mi (112.74/km^{2})
- Time zone: UTC-5 (Eastern (EST))
  - Summer (DST): UTC-4 (EDT)
- ZIP code: 29520
- Area codes: 843 and 854
- FIPS code: 45-12205
- GNIS feature ID: 2812944

Cash is an unincorporated community and census-designated place (CDP) in Chesterfield County, in the U.S. state of South Carolina. It was first listed as a CDP in the 2020 census with a population of 445.

== History ==
The community was named after one Colonel E. B. Cash. A variant name was "Cashs". A post office called Cash's Depot was established in 1880, and remained in operation until 1917.

== Demographics ==
Historical population
Census	Pop.	Note	%±
2020	445		—
U.S. Decennial Census; 2020

Cash first appeared as a census designated place in the 2020 U.S. census.

=== 2020 census ===
Cash CDP, South Carolina – Racial and ethnic composition Note: the US Census treats Hispanic/Latino as an ethnic category. This table excludes Latinos from the racial categories and assigns them to a separate category. Hispanics/Latinos may be of any race.
Race / Ethnicity (NH = Non-Hispanic)	Pop 2020	% 2020
White alone (NH)	35	7.87%
Black or African American alone (NH)	368	82.70%
Native American or Alaska Native alone (NH)	3	0.67%
Asian alone (NH)	4	0.90%
Pacific Islander alone (NH)	0	0.00%
Some Other Race alone (NH)	6	1.35%
Mixed Race or Multi-Racial (NH)	21	4.72%
Hispanic or Latino (any race)	8	1.80%
Total	445	100.00%
