= Pickerel Lake (Dakota and Ramsey counties, Minnesota) =

Lake in the state of Minnesota, United States

- Location within Minnesota
- Location: Dakota County, Minnesota, Minnesota, US
- Coordinates: 44°55′2.51″N 93°7′13.6158″W
- Type: oxbow lake
- Primary outflows: Mississippi River
- Basin countries: United States
- Surface area: 78 acres (32 ha)
- Max. depth: 11 ft (3.4 m)
- Surface elevation: 696 ft (212 m)
- Settlements: Lilydale, Minnesota

Pickerel Lake is a lake in the U.S. state of Minnesota. It is an Oxbow lake of the Mississippi River in Lilydale, Minnesota. The Omaha Road Bridge Number 15 crosses the Northeastern end.

Pickerel Lake was named for the pickerel fish, commonly known as the Northern pike, native to its waters.

== See also ==
- List of lakes in Minnesota
