= Pickerel Lake (Freeborn County, Minnesota) =

Lake in the state of Minnesota, United States

- Location within Minnesota
- Location: Freeborn County, Minnesota
- Coordinates: 43°37′48″N 93°24′27″W
- Type: lake

Pickerel Lake is a lake in Freeborn County, in the U.S. state of Minnesota.

Pickerel Lake was named for its stock of pickerel fish.

== See also ==
- List of lakes in Minnesota
