= Kirk–Holden war =

Struggle against the Ku Klux Klan in North Carolina, U.S.

- Date: July–November 1870
- Location: North Carolina, United States; particularly Caswell and Alamance counties
- Type: Police operation
- Cause: Violence and intimidation caused by Ku Klux Klan activity; Murders of Wyatt Outlaw and John W. Stephens
- Motive: Suppression of the Klan
- Organised by: North Carolina Governor William Woods Holden; Colonel George Washington Kirk
- Outcome: Suppression of Klan activity in Alamance and Caswell counties; Impeachment and removal of Holden
- Arrests: 102 suspected Klansmen

The Kirk–Holden war was a police operation taken against the white supremacist organization Ku Klux Klan by the government in the state of North Carolina in the United States in 1870. The Klan was using murder and intimidation to prevent formerly enslaved people and members of the Republican Party from exercising their right to vote in the aftermath of the American Civil War. Following an increase in Klan activity in North Carolina—including the murder of a black town commissioner in Alamance County and the murder of a Republican state senator in Caswell County—Republican Governor of North Carolina William W. Holden declared both areas to be in a state of insurrection. In accordance with the Shoffner Act, Holden ordered a militia be raised to restore order in the counties and arrest Klansmen suspected of violence. This resulted in the creation of the 1st and 2nd North Carolina Troops, which Holden placed under the overall command of Colonel George Washington Kirk.

In July 1870, Kirk oversaw the deployment of the 2nd North Carolina Troops in Alamance and Caswell counties, while the 1st North Carolina Troops garrisoned the city of Raleigh. A total of 82 men in Alamance and 19 in Caswell were detained on suspicion of Klan-related activity, including a former member of the United States Congress and the sheriffs of both counties, and Klan activity in both counties promptly ceased. No one was killed during the campaign, though the militiamen at times showed poor discipline and used foul language. Kirk's second-in-command also exceeded his orders and sent men to arrest a newspaper editor in Orange County, which was not declared to be in insurrection. Holden initially refused to have the men brought to regular courts under writs of habeas corpus, planning to try them by military tribunal, but eventually gave way to pressure from Chief Justice of the North Carolina Supreme Court Richmond Mumford Pearson and United States District Court Judge George Washington Brooks. As a result, 49 men were indicted in court for crimes, but all were ultimately acquitted and released by late August.

The militiamen were also deployed to guard polling stations during North Carolina's legislative elections on August 4, but Holden's use of the militia as well as other complaints about Republican corruption and Klan intimidation led the Conservatives and Democrats to take a majority of seats in the North Carolina General Assembly. Holden ordered the militia to disband on September 21, and on November 10 he declared that there was no longer a state of insurrection in Alamance and Caswell counties. Conservative and Democratic-leaning newspapers heavily criticized his actions and his political opponents coined the name "Kirk–Holden war" to describe the affair. The General Assembly subsequently filed articles of impeachment against Holden in December and ultimately removed him from office in March 1871. Holden was the first governor in the United States to be removed in such fashion, and his campaign against the Klan and the impeachment crippled the image of the Republican Party in North Carolina for many years. The General Assembly subsequently repealed the Shoffner Act and passed another law designed to grant amnesty to Klansmen.

== Background ==
=== Political situation in North Carolina ===
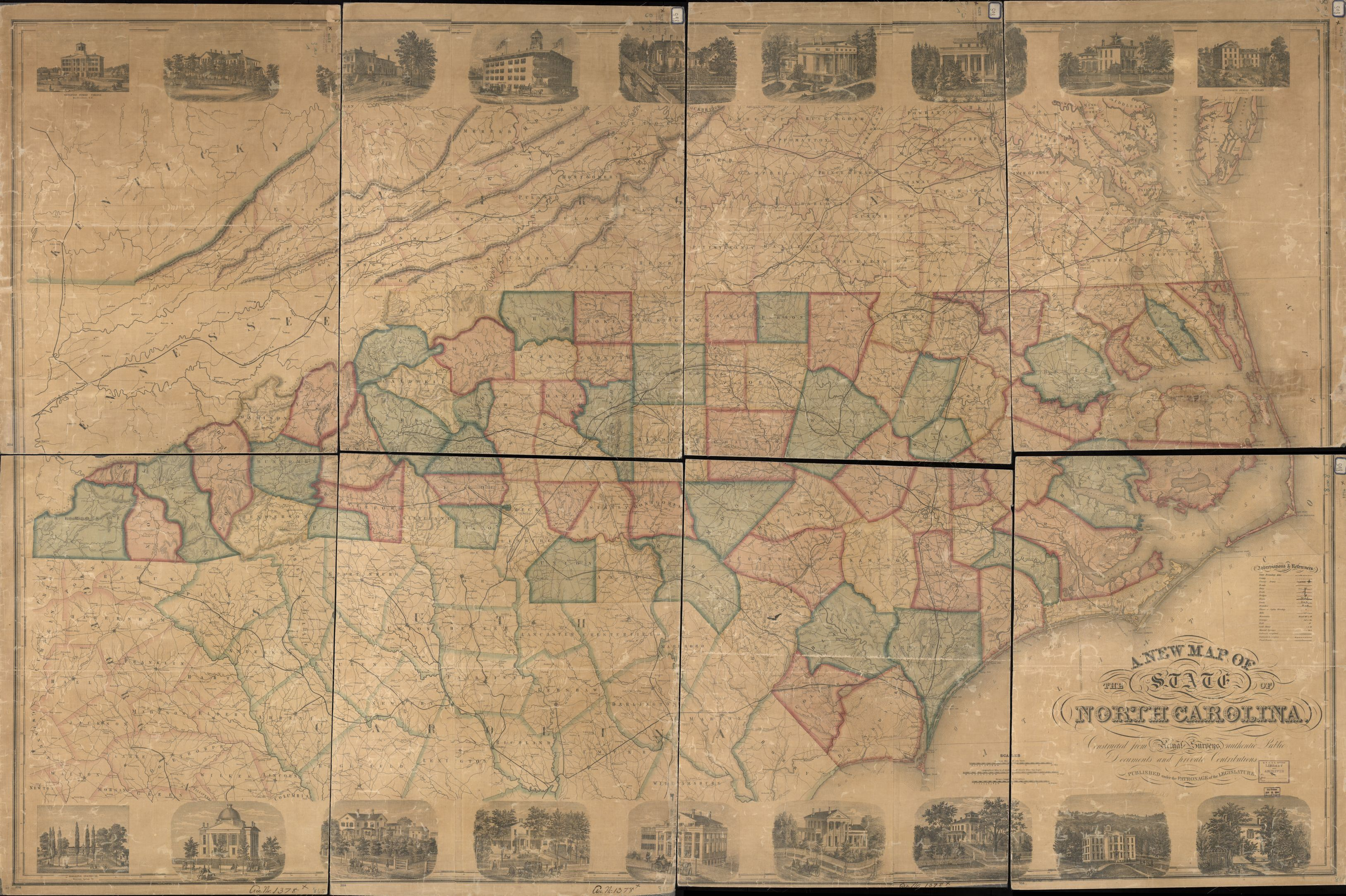
Map of North Carolina showing counties circa 1860

In 1861, the state of North Carolina seceded from the United States and joined other Southern states in forming the Confederate States of America. The Confederacy subsequently fought with the non-seceding states, or Union, during the American Civil War. The conflict caused intense political divisions within North Carolina, as many of its residents, particularly those in the mountains and coastal regions, were opposed to the war and maintained Unionist sympathies. Politician William W. Holden unsuccessfully sought election as Governor of North Carolina in 1864 on a "peace platform" which included withdrawing from the war. The Confederacy ultimately lost the war in 1865 and North Carolina reverted to the jurisdiction of the United States. The issuance of the Emancipation Proclamation during the conflict meant that the federal government recognized the freedom of over 330,000 enslaved blacks in North Carolina; this came into effect in most of the state with the end of the war. With the ratification of the Thirteenth Amendment to the United States Constitution in December 1865, slavery was formally abolished across the United States.

In 1867, the United States Congress passed the Reconstruction Acts, which placed most of the Southern states under military occupation; North Carolina was placed in the Second Military District. The acts also disfranchised many former Confederates, and required states to revise their constitutions to enfranchise freedmen and ratify the Fourteenth Amendment to the United States Constitution, which granted equal citizenship to black people. That year, Holden organized a Republican Party branch within North Carolina with both black and white members. North Carolina Republicans generally favored equal citizenship and civil rights for all persons regardless of race. The opposing Democratic Party, also known during this time as the Conservatives, (Note: The grouping known as the "Conservative Party" in North Carolina referred to a coalition of former Whigs and Democrats who opposed Republicans during the Reconstruction era. They officially reorganized as the North Carolina Democratic Party in 1876. The Republicans often referred to the Conservatives as "Democrats" when criticizing them to associate them with the pre-war party.) encompassed a range of opinion but generally advocated for the withholding of certain rights from non-whites and forcing blacks to work menial jobs. Republicans dominated the convention which revised the state constitution in 1868, resulting in a more democratic document. That year state legislative and gubernatorial elections were held. The Democratic Party attempted to paint the Republican Party as the "Negro" organization, but the Republicans won a majority in the North Carolina General Assembly and Holden was elected Governor of North Carolina by a margin greater than 18,000 votes. Numerous black men were also elected to office. Federal military presence diminished, though troops remained posted in the capital city of Raleigh. In 1869 North Carolina ratified the Fifteenth Amendment to the United States Constitution, guaranteeing the right to vote to all citizens regardless of race or color.

=== Rise of Ku Klux Klan activity ===
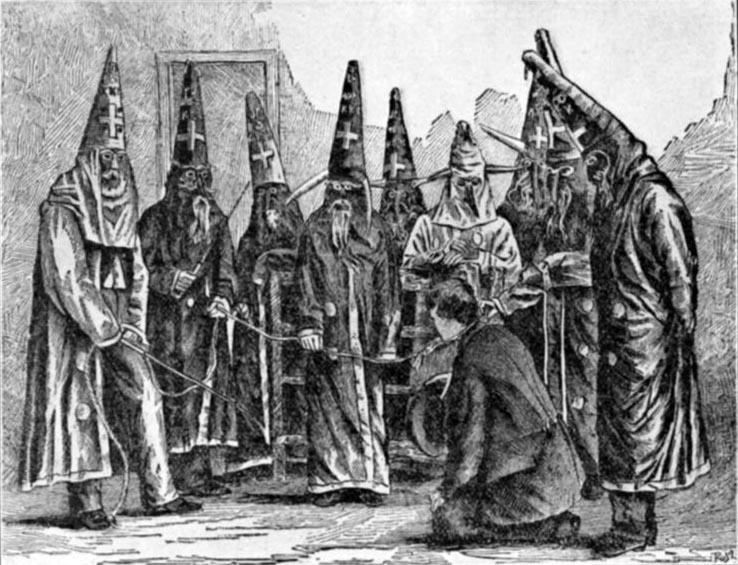
Engraving of Ku Klux Klansmen in North Carolina in 1870, based on a photograph

The Ku Klux Klan was founded as a fraternal society in December 1865 in Pulaski, Tennessee, by several former Confederate officers. It quickly became a vehicle for terrorizing black people and white Republicans across the South. In 1867, several Klan chapters met in Nashville and produced a constitution endorsing white supremacy and requiring potential members to support "the restitution of the Southern people to all their rights". Organization of the Klan was loose and fractured across regions, but all chapters were generally committed to limiting the rights of freedmen and opposing the Republican Party. Klan activity first cropped up in North Carolina during the elections of 1868. It committed some minor acts of violence—including destruction of blacks' property—but had little impact on the conduct of the contests. Klan membership grew as white North Carolinians became frustrated with the Republican government and by 1869 Klansmen were murdering black people to intimidate them and prospective Republican voters. Klan murders continued throughout the Piedmont region of the state through 1869 and 1870, especially in the counties of Moore, Chatham, Alamance, Orange, and Caswell. Violence was worst in counties that had significant black populations.

Local authorities were unable and often unwilling to prosecute Klan-related offenses. At Holden's request, in February 1869 the General Assembly authorized the creation of a detective force to investigate and undermine the Klan. Arrests were made but the violence continued. In November Holden asked the General Assembly to strengthen the provisions of the state militia law (Note: At Holden's request, the General Assembly had passed a state militia law on August 13, 1868. It empowered the governor to call up forces at the request of any five county magistrates to preserve order.) so that he could better confront the violence, telling the body, "Numerous complaints have been made to me of violence and mob law in certain counties, by parties who ride at night armed and disguised [...] injuring, insulting, and punishing inoffensive whites and colored persons." Holden thought that a revised law would ameliorate victims' fears and would protect black and white Republicans from Klan assaults. State Senator T. M. Shoffner of Alamance County introduced a bill to Holden's request on December 16, titled "An Act to Secure the Better Protection of Life and Property". Its provisions empowered the governor to suspend the writ of habeas corpus, declare a state of insurrection "whenever in his judgement the civil authorities in any county are unable to protect its citizens in the enjoyment of life and property", and request the assistance of federal authorities if state militia proved insufficient. Conservatives in the legislature delayed passage of the bill—dubbed the Shoffner Act—and particularly objected to the provision for the suspension of the writ of habeas corpus, suggesting it was unconstitutional. The provision was removed and the act was passed into law in January 1870. The Klan was affronted by the law and several Alamance Klansmen plotted to kill Shoffner at his home. The plan dissolved after Shoffner was tipped off and escaped, but he continued to receive death threats and eventually fled to Indiana. Klansmen in Moore also proposed the assassination of Holden during this time.

== Prelude ==
=== Klan violence in Alamance County and the murder of Wyatt Outlaw ===
Klan violence in the Piedmont worsened after the passage of the Shoffner Act. Early in the morning on February 26, 1870, about 100 masked Klansmen rode to Graham, Alamance County, and abducted Wyatt Outlaw, a town commissioner and leading black figure in the county's Republican Party chapter. They hanged him in the courthouse square and pinned a note to his body, reading "Beware, you guilty, both white and black." That evening Klansmen visited the Alamance home of black Republican Henry Holt. Holt was not there, but the Klansmen told his wife that he should leave the area or face the same fate as Outlaw. Holt promptly fled the county. Less than two weeks later another black man, William Puryear, was found dead in a millpond tied down to a rock. Puryear, who was mentally disabled, had claimed to have followed two of Outlaw's killers to their homes and identified them. Graham Republican H. A. Badham wrote to Holden, saying, "Every republican in the County who has stood up for his own rights and that of freedmen, is in danger. The civil authorities are powerless to bring these offenders against law and humanity, to Justice."

On March 7, Holden issued a proclamation of a state of insurrection in Alamance County. Hoping to use this as a warning against future offenses, Holden dispatched 40 federal troops stationed in Raleigh to Alamance. The lieutenant in charge of the soldiers reported that the situation was deteriorating and convinced the mayor and a local magistrate to issue warrants for the arrest of 12 men suspected of involvement in various murders, but the charges were dropped when other citizens offered alibis and death threats were made against the officials. Holden subsequently wrote to United States President Ulysses S. Grant to ask for assistance. Mindful that the Shoffner Act did not empower him as governor to suspend the writ of habeas corpus, he wrote:

If Congress would authorize the suspension by the President of the writ of habeas corpus in certain localities, and if criminals could be arrested and tried before military tribunals, and shot, we would soon have peace and order throughout all this country. The remedy would be a sharp and bloody one, but it is as indispensable as was the suppression of the rebellion [during the Civil War].

Grant responded by dispatching more federal troops to North Carolina, but took no additional action. Holden made further appeals for federal support, asking United States Senator for North Carolina Joseph Carter Abbott for help and sending North Carolina Adjutant General Abial W. Fisher to Richmond, Virginia, to speak with Major General Edward Canby, commander of the Second Military District, to ask for reinforcements from the United States Army. Canby was not convinced that Alamance County was truly experiencing an insurrection and told Fisher that only the president could send more forces. United States Secretary of War William W. Belknap eventually dispatched two infantry companies to the county. North Carolina Klansmen remained attentive to the situation in Alamance and realized that Holden was isolated, but tempered their activities in the county over the next few months. For his part, Holden dispatched more detectives across the state to investigate the Klan and encouraged local authorities to take action.

=== Klan violence in Caswell County and the murder of John W. Stephens ===
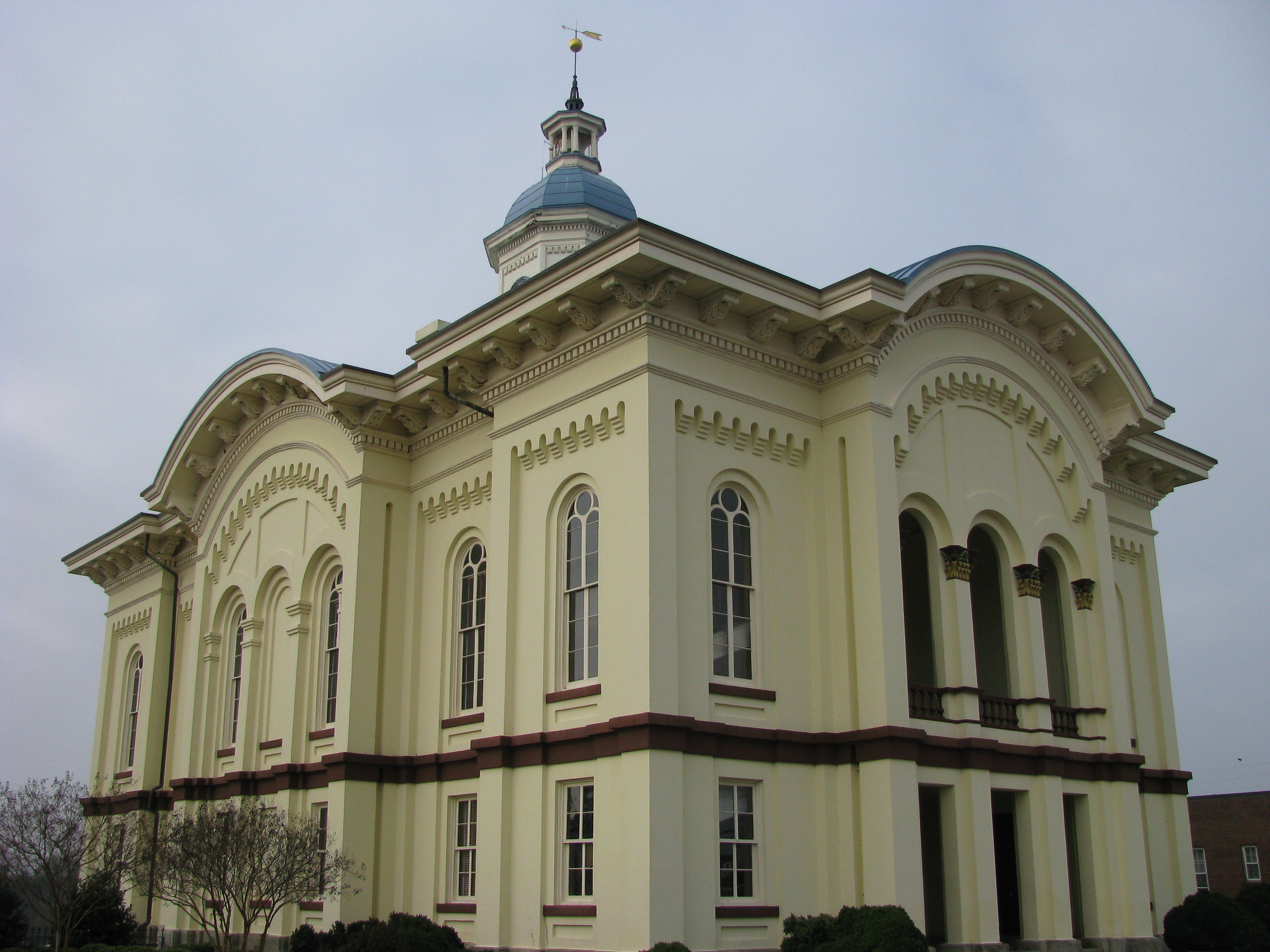
Klansmen murdered State Senator John W. Stephens in the Caswell County Courthouse on May 21, 1870.

Meanwhile, Klan violence in Caswell County escalated. Klansmen flogged at least 21 black and white Republicans between April 2 and May 15, and murdered Robin Jacobs, a black man from the vicinity of Leasburg, on May 13. The Republican State Senator of Caswell County, John W. Stephens, became increasingly fearful of Klan attack. On May 21 he went to the Caswell County Courthouse in Yanceyville to watch the county Democratic Party host its nominating convention. After watching the proceedings he accompanied Frank A. Wiley to the ground level of the courthouse. Stephens wished to convince Wiley, a Democrat and former sheriff, to seek re-election to the office with his support and thus achieve a political reconciliation in the county. Wiley had secretly agreed to work with the Klan and lured Stephens into a trap; between 10 and 15 Klansmen awaited him on the ground floor and detained him. John Lea, the founder of the local Klan chapter, entered the room where Stephens was being held with more men. One Klansmen, G. T. Mitchell, held a rope around Stephens's neck, while another, Tom Oliver, stabbed him to death. The Klansmen left and locked the room, planning to return to move the body that night.

After Stephens failed to return home that evening, his brothers and friends came to the courthouse to look for him. One of them saw a body in the locked room through a window and, after forcing their way inside, identified it as Stephens. The coroner conducted an inquest which included the interviewing of numerous persons, including Wiley and Lea, who lied about their knowledge of the affair. Caswell County Sheriff Jesse Griffith, himself a Klansmen, made no serious attempts to investigate the killing. The coroner's report ultimately concluded that the state senator was murdered by "persons unknown", and the circumstances of the killing remained unclear until Lea's signed confession to participation in the events was published posthumously in 1935. Klansmen and the Conservative press accused black people of committing the murder.

=== Holden's response ===
Holden was disgusted by the murder of Stephens. On May 25, he publicly condemned the killing and offered a $500 reward for information leading to the arrest of the perpetrators. He also wired Abbott and Senator John Pool to ask for federal assistance. The United States Congress passed the Enforcement Act of 1870, authorizing the president and other federal officials to call up the United States Army and militia forces to assist in Klan-suppression efforts, but Grant chose not to employ it. Holden received a stream of letters asking for more aggressive action. He was initially wary of more forceful moves, fearing a political backlash, but by early June had formulated plans to call forth a state militia to occupy Alamance and Caswell County. He hoped he could successfully contain the Klan in a manner similar to actions taken by Governor Powell Clayton in Arkansas.

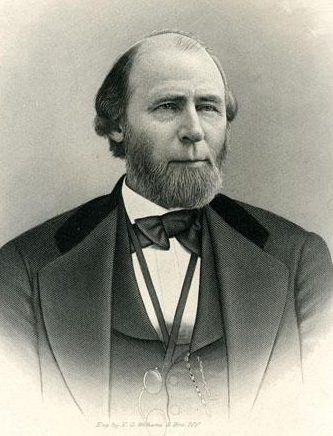
Portrait of Governor William Woods Holden

On June 8, Holden hosted a meeting of Republicans in Raleigh to discuss the situation in Caswell County. (Note: Those attending were Senator Pool, Adjutant General Fisher, James H. Harris, Isaac Young, Willie D. Jones, William J. Clarke, William F. Henderson, Richard C. Badger, S.T. Carrow, Henderson Adams, David A. Jenkins, and James Walker Hood.) Pool recommended that militiamen be sent to arrest Klansmen and that they be put through a military tribunal. Richard Badger, one of the governor's closest advisers, suggested that this was politically risky and that arrested Klansmen should be handed over to a specially-appointed judge and tried in regular courts. Holden eventually agreed with Pool, and then moved on to discuss the make-up of the militia to be raised. The officials ruled out the use of the regular state militia—who they thought sympathized with the Klan—and the use of a black militia—which they feared would worsen race relations. They concluded that a force of white militiamen should be raised among western North Carolinians and that it should be led by a man from the mountains, a Republican political stronghold. They also agreed that another militia contingent of Piedmont and eastern North Carolinians be mustered to occupy the state capital at the same time. Once the western force had suppressed the Klan, detachments of both groups would be dispatched around the state to protect polling stations for the elections scheduled for August.

Holden wrote to W. W. Rollins of Madison County and asked that he muster and lead the western militia to suppress the Klan. Rollins declined but advised Holden to seek the services of George Washington Kirk, who had previously commanded a militia contingent in suppressing the Klan in Tennessee. By mid-June Kirk had arrived in Raleigh and Holden had commissioned him as colonel and ordered him to raise a militia of "loyal" western North Carolinians. Kirk had led Union troops during the Civil War and conducted raids in the mountains; Holden hoped this connection to the state would engender Kirk some support and allow him to recruit loyal Republicans and some of his former soldiers. Some mountain Republicans expressed doubts about the political image that would accompany the movement of troops through the area, but Holden was not dissuaded. Most of Kirk's recruits were young men averaging 21 years in age, though a few were older and nine had served under his command during the war. Most were North Carolinians, but 18 came from Tennessee and other states, in violation of the militia law. Command of the eastern and Piedmont militia was given to William J. Clarke of New Bern, and Holden dispatched him to Washington, D.C., to obtain federal materiel assistance from Grant and the Secretary of War, which he secured. Grant also offered to send additional federal troops to the state until the state forces were ready, but Holden demurred, saying they were not needed. Clarke was initially given overall command of both militias before it was transferred to Kirk. (Note: During this time, Holden completely reorganized the regular state militia, choosing officers he perceived to be widely respected in the hopes that such an action would allay public concerns about the deployment of troops. The changes were announced on June 22. Clarke was made a major general of the "1st Division".)

By early July, Kirk had organized nine companies of militiamen and rode to the Piedmont via rail. His men were issued uniforms and Springfield rifles and officially committed to service at Company Shops in Alamance. This unit was formally known as the 2nd North Carolina State Troops. Kirk left 200 men there under his second-in-command, Lieutenant Colonel George B. Bergen, and hastened to Raleigh to meet Holden. Holden supplied him with a list of suspects to arrest—created with information given by Republicans in Caswell and Alamance—and ordered Kirk to personally assume command in Caswell County. Holden also made plans to convene a military tribunal—composed of men selected by him and Kirk—to try those arrested later in the month. On July 8 he declared Caswell to be in a state of insurrection. Clarke's militia of segregated white and black companies became the 1st North Carolina State Troops. It arrived in Raleigh on July 19, and made camp at Old Baptist Grove, several blocks from the North Carolina State Capitol. These troops played a minimal role in the ensuing anti-Klan action. Clarke ordered some of his men to guard strategic locations in Raleigh, while one contingent was dispatched to bring supplies to Kirk's force in Alamance. In addition to Republican and Unionist sympathies, historian Samuel B. McGuire speculated that the men that enlisted in the militias probably hoped to benefit from the pay offered.

Meanwhile, two companies of the 4th Regiment United States Artillery arrived in Yanceyville, while another went to Roxboro in Person County. At the same time, a United States marshal requested the assistance of troops in Chatham County to apprehend Klansmen suspected of murdering a freedman. A detachment of infantry were dispatched and captured most of the suspects, but further requests by the marshal for army assistance were denied. These arrests proved to be the only instance of direct army action against the Klan in North Carolina in 1870.

== The war ==
=== Intervention in Alamance and Caswell counties ===
On July 13, Holden ordered Kirk's militia to "take the necessary steps to preserve order, and to give the fullest protection to life and property" as well as "take charge of the public buildings [in Alamance and Caswell counties], and arrest and hold for examination persons accused of felonies, especially those charged with, or being accessory to the murder of J.W. Stephens and Wyatt Outlaw." (Note: Holden later wrote that the campaign against the Klan was delayed by at least a month due to the state's poor financial situation and only proceeded after the North Carolina Railroad made a payment of dividends in July to the state treasury.) Kirk swept through Alamance and made some arrests before proceeding to Caswell County. He arrived there with about 350 men on July 18, and established his headquarters in Yanceyville. Upon arriving, Kirk learned that congressional candidates James Madison Leach and William L. Scott were holding a debate in the courthouse. He ordered Bergen to surround the building, and then he entered and arrested numerous suspects, including Leach, before Scott interceded for his release. After one officer was assaulted, the militia fixed bayonets. Once the courthouse was cleared, Kirk ordered Bergen to return to Company Shops and assume command of their forces in Alamance County.

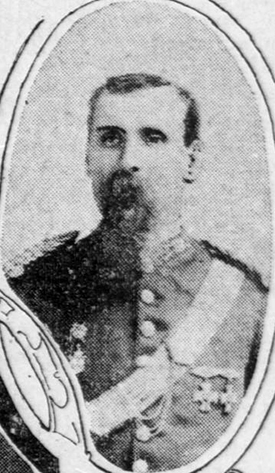
Colonel George Washington Kirk led the militia action in Alamance and Caswell counties.

A total of 82 men in Alamance and 19 in Caswell were detained. Anticipating the militia's action, some Alamance Klan leaders fled the county, though three suspected leaders were successfully captured. Some Klan members who had become disenchanted with the organization's use of violence decided to confess and renounce their ties to the group. Alamance politician James E. Boyd did so, convinced 15 other members to follow suit, and named several other Klansmen to the militia. Frightened by the intervention, they submitted signed confessions to the clerk of court in Alamance in the hopes of obtaining amnesty. Boyd continued to supply Holden with information on the Klan throughout the rest of the campaign. Due to the intervention in Alamance and Caswell, Klan activities in both counties promptly ceased.

The arrestees encompassed persons from various social backgrounds, including former United States Congressman John Kerr Jr., the sheriffs of both Alamance and Caswell, and smallholding farmers. Wiley was also apprehended, and had to be subdued by several militiamen after refusing their summons. Detainees were held in the Alamance and Caswell courthouses. The militiamen at times showed poor discipline and used foul language. Conservatives complained about militiamen stealing from local gardens and one stripping naked in public view to bathe, but they did not otherwise bother local residents. Bergen exceeded his orders by stringing up three suspects to extract confessions. The Conservative press eagerly characterized the intervention as a "reign of terror" and widely circulated a report of a stringing incident in Yanceyville. After hearing of it, Holden wrote to Kirk to remind him that, "All prisoners, no matter how guilty they may be supposed to be, should be treated humanely."

Fearing that the Klansmen might try to free captives in Yanceyville, Holden wrote to Grant to ask for federal reinforcements. Grant responded by dispatching six companies. On July 27, Major General George Meade established the temporary military District of North Carolina and placed it under the command of Colonel Henry Jackson Hunt. By the time Hunt assumed his post on 1 August, there were about 700 federal soldiers in the state, stationed in Raleigh, Yanceyville, Graham, Roxboro, and Ruffin. Officers reported that the army presence boosted a sense of security in the insurrectionary counties, but did not apprehend suspected Klansmen themselves. Kirk became increasingly fearful of Klan attack in Caswell and asked for artillery, but the local army commander, Captain George Rodney, thought these concerns were unfounded and dismissed the request. Tensions remained high between militiamen and federal soldiers in the county, with the two forces hurling insults and occasional stones at one another. Rodney dismissed the militia as "nothing more than an armed mob".

On July 22, unknown assailants opened fire on the colored troops of Company H of the 1st North Carolina State Troops encamped at Old Baptist Grove in Raleigh. Sentries returned fire, but no one was hurt. The Conservative and Democratic press in Raleigh used the episode to attack the colored troops, alleging that they had not been attacked and either fired at nothing or shot at another militia company. On August 5, Bergen ordered his men to cross into Orange County and arrest Josiah Turner. He was apprehended at his home and brought to Company Shops before being moved to the Caswell County Courthouse. Turner was the editor of the Raleigh Sentinel and a frequent critic of Holden and his use of the militias. Many Republicans thought he was a Klansmen, though there was little direct evidence of this. Holden had wanted Turner arrested, but only if he had crossed into Alamance or Caswell. Upon hearing of Bergen's excesses, Holden condemned him and Kirk ordered his arrest on August 26. Bergen was detained and jailed in Raleigh under the guard of Company H of the 1st North Carolina State Troops.

=== Legal disputes ===
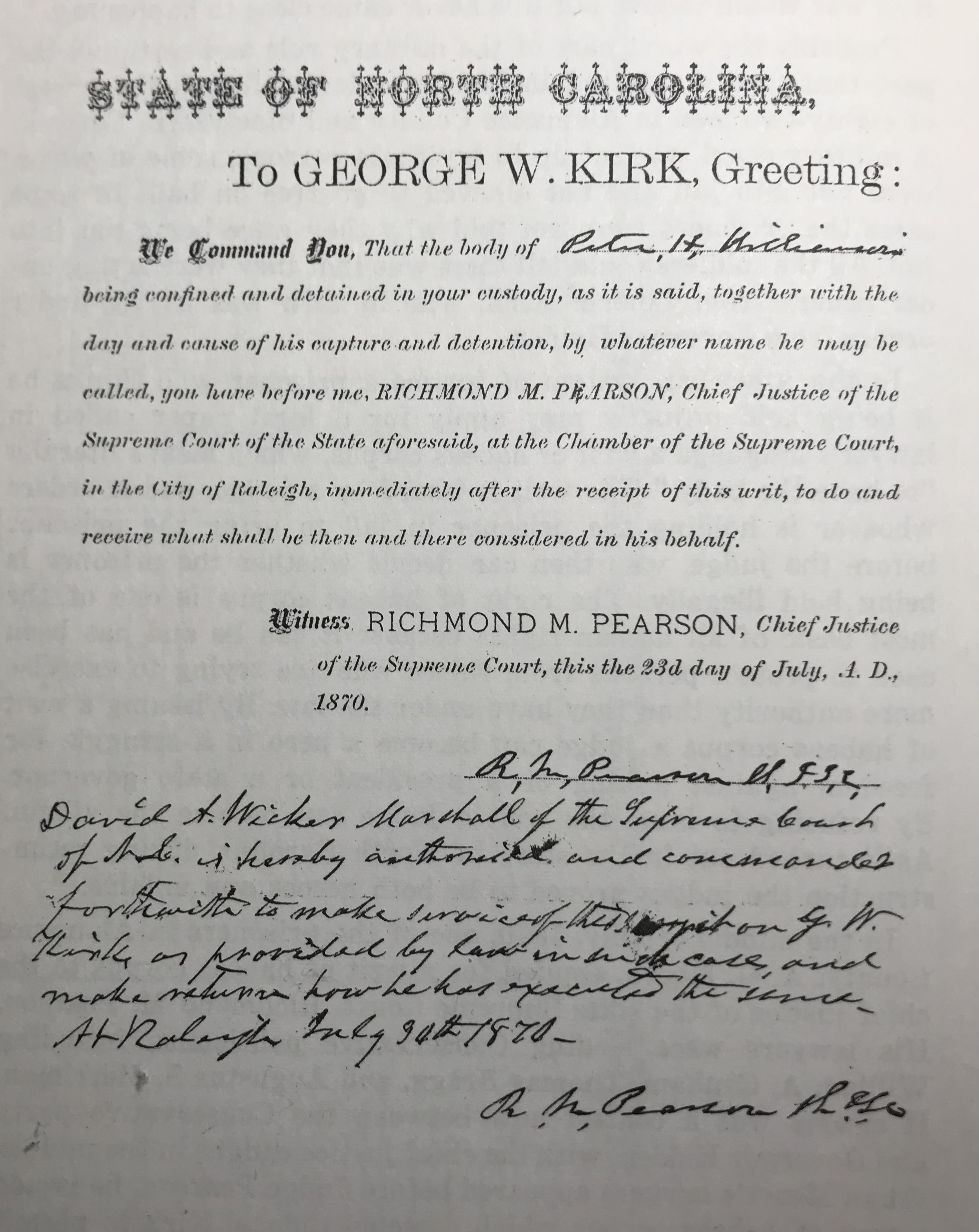
Writ of habeas corpus signed by Chief Justice Richmond Mumford Pearson directing Kirk to deliver a prisoner to court

Almost immediately after the suspected Klansmen were arrested, they began appealing to Chief Justice of the North Carolina Supreme Court Richmond Mumford Pearson to write writs of habeas corpus for them. Pearson was a Republican and sympathetic Holden's efforts, but recognized that North Carolina's constitution forbade the suspension of the writ and thus saw the failure for these to be issued as unlawful. On July 18, he wrote a writ of habeas corpus and delivered it to Kirk so that the accused could be brought before a court and indicted. Holden ordered Kirk to ignore the writ and then wrote to Pearson, stating that Klan activities in Alamance and Caswell counties constituted insurrection and thus forced him to declare martial law and suspend the writ. He further argued that this was necessary to protect citizens, writing, "the civil Courts are no longer a protection to life, liberty and property; assassination and outrage go unpunished, and the civil magistrates are intimidated and are afraid to perform their functions [...] Thus civil government was crumbling around me." The attorneys of prisoner A. G. Moore suggested that Pearson issue a writ of attachment to a county sheriff to arrest Kirk, but the chief justice refused, fearing such an action would precipitate a civil war-like scenario in Alamance and Caswell. Pearson ultimately acceded to Holden's argument, stating that he had expended all judicial powers available to him. Conservative publications strongly condemned the refusal to respect the writ.

With Pearson declaring his inability to act, the detainees sought the assistance of United States District Court Judge George Washington Brooks. On August 6, Brooks issued a writ of habeas corpus for the detainees, citing the federal Habeas Corpus Act of 1867. Holden was shocked that the federal government would intervene in this fashion and wrote to Grant to request that he overrule the writ, maintaining that the federal judiciary lacked jurisdiction in the state murder cases the arrests principally concerned. Grant gave the letter to United States Attorney General Amos T. Akerman. Secretary Belknap forwarded Akerman's advice to Holden, asking him to accede to the writ issued by Brooks. Holden subsequently ordered Kirk to abide to the writ. The detainees were split into two groups, with the first sent to be heard by Pearson in Raleigh and the second—including Turner, to be seen by Brooks in Salisbury. The state's prosecutorial team in Salisbury did not realize that Brooks would require them to provide evidence of the accused men's possible wrongdoing, and thus Brooks ordered the men released. In Raleigh the prosecutors procured such evidence, resulting in Pearson indicting 49 men and ordering them to be tried in Alamance and Caswell superior courts. None of them were convicted in the ensuing proceedings.

=== Elections monitoring ===
In the week before the elections on August 4, Kirk sent a detachment to monitor the polls in Shelby in Cleveland County. Clarke sent a portion of Company B to Carthage in Moore County, men from Company D to Chapel Hill in Orange County, and a detachment of Company D to Goldsboro in Wayne County. The state elections were conducted peacefully and without incident. The militiamen also allowed the imprisoned Klansmen to cast their ballots. The Democrats scored a major victory, winning back the majority of seats in the General Assembly, while the Republicans garnered 13,000 fewer votes than they had in 1868. Historians have concluded that this was due to Klan intimidation, accusations of financial corruption levied at Republicans, and the view that Holden's deployment of the militias was tyrannical. Republicans were shocked by their loss. Wilson Carey, a black Republican from Caswell County, won reelection to his seat in the North Carolina House of Representatives, but the body later invalidated his victory, accusing Kirk's forces of manipulating the contest. Clarke won election to the North Carolina Senate representing Craven County but, under intense political pressure for his role in the militia, resigned before ever taking his seat and accepted Holden's appointment to a judgeship.

The Republicans' defeat greatly dispirited the militiamen in Raleigh. Early on the morning of August 8, a drunken United States Army soldier stumbled towards the camp at Old Baptist Grove. The militia sentry on duty ordered him to stop and identify himself, and when the soldier failed to heed his warnings, the sentry shot him in the legs. Army officials were infuriated by the incident, but the Raleigh mayor hosted a special hearing and acquitted the sentry of any wrongdoing. Afterwards, the militia camp was moved several blocks. The courts in Alamance and Caswell counties released the last accused Klansmen in late August, effectively ending the campaign. Major General Meade dissolved the District of North Carolina on September 13, and federal forces were gradually dispatched elsewhere. Holden ordered the militias to disband on September 21, but retained a portion of Company H to act as bodyguards for two weeks to forestall any assassination attempts. On November 10, he declared that there was no longer a state of insurrection in Alamance and Caswell counties.

== Aftermath ==
=== Media response ===
According to McGuire, the Kirk–Holden war was a police operation and not a true war. The term "Kirk–Holden war" or "Holden–Kirk war" (the latter was commonly used in the 1870s) was coined by Holden's Democratic opponents and used as a derisive epithet. No persons were killed during the affair. The Kirk–Holden war led the state's Conservative media to reorient their attacks on the state's Reconstruction government towards Holden's leadership in the operation and away from their preoccupation with a railroad bonds scandal then embroiling the General Assembly. The Conservative press mocked and criticized the militias' performance during the event and after they were disbanded, characterizing Kirk and his men as poor, backwards, and barbaric. Republican newspapers came to their defense. The Democratic press accused Holden of deploying the militias as a political maneuver to try to secure a Republican victory in the elections and of acting unlawfully. They also declared that the action was a waste of government funds and omitted any mention of Klan-related violence. The New York Times was also critical, accusing the governor of acting as a "reckless partisan". The Republican Raleigh-based paper Weekly Standard, edited by Holden's son, attempted to defend the actions of the government by highlighting the Klan's violent actions preceding the affair. Northern Republican papers were generally defensive of the decision to intervene against the Klan, but accused the governor of appointing unsuitable men to lead the militia. Following the elections, some Republicans blamed Holden for their defeat, while several Conservative papers began calling for his impeachment.

=== Legal consequences and Holden's impeachment ===
On September 1, Turner petitioned the North Carolina Supreme Court to issue warrants for the arrest of Holden, Kirk, and several other militiamen. The court rejected his request, but other former detainees lodged official complaints against Kirk for false arrest. Fearing that Conservative authorities would try to detain him, he asked a United States marshal to arrest him and take him to Raleigh. While passing through Hillsborough he narrowly avoided being seized by the Sheriff of Orange County and a posse. The Raleigh court where he was brought dismissed his case, and on December 1 he fled to Washington, D.C., and found employment as a police officer. Turner later tracked him down but was unable to obtain his arrest.

Title page of the transcript of the arguments in Holden's impeachment trial

In his opening address to the new legislature, Holden made overtures for political conciliation but defended his use of the militia as necessary to maintain law and order. Regardless, Conservatives demanded Holden's impeachment, and on December 9 Orange County legislator Frederick N. Strudwick—himself a Klan leader—introduced eight articles of impeachment in the North Carolina House of Representatives. The first article accused Holden of falsely declaring a state of insurrection in Alamance County to "stir up civil war, and subvert personal and public liberty, and the Constitution of said State". The second article stated the same concerning Caswell County. The last six items concerned various issues, including the unlawful detention of 102 men (namely including Turner), the suspension of the writ of habeas corpus, and the misuse of state funds for the militia. The impeachment resolution was referred to the House Judiciary Committee and promptly adopted. On December 19, the House voted 60 to 46 to impeach the governor. Most black representatives opposed impeachment, and 17 of them signed a joint "Address to the Colored People of North Carolina" warning that, "When Gov. Holden is disposed of those whom he protected will be the next victims." (Note: An additional article impeachment was adopted with a large majority by the House, including support from three black representatives, on February 9, 1871, accusing Holden of conspiring with George William Swepson to defraud the state with false railroad bonds. It was ultimately not tried in the Senate for fear of implicating some state senators involved in the ongoing impeachment trial.)

In preparation for the impeachment trial scheduled to begin in January 1871, Holden handed over governing authority to Lieutenant Governor Tod Robinson Caldwell. Chief Justice Pearson set about creating a court of impeachment. On January 23, Holden's defense team issued the governor's formal response to the articles of impeachment. He defended his decision to proclaim a state of insurrection in Caswell and Alamance counties, arguing it was necessary to protect the lives of citizens, and included a 12-page supplement documenting Klan actions in the Piedmont. His responses to the other articles were shorter, though he maintained that he had acted legally. He also noted that Bergen's decision to arrest Turner was taken without his authorization.

The impeachment trial lasted from January 30 to March 22. The prosecution summoned 61 witnesses, most of whom testified about alleged abuses committed by Kirk and his militiamen. The defense supplied 112 witnesses, most of whom attested to the activities of the Klan in the Piedmont with the aim of demonstrating that an insurrectionary setting existed in Caswell and Alamance. With regards to the other articles, Holden's attorneys argued that the Shoffner Act empowered him to act as he had. The proceedings were mostly orderly, though Holden stormed out after Turner insinuated that he was a "bad man" during his testimony. The North Carolina Senate convened on March 22 to vote on the conviction. Though a simple majority voted in favor of conviction on the first two articles, they lacked the necessary two-thirds majority to pass. Holden was convicted on the other six articles, and the Senate subsequently passed a resolution removing him from office and barring him from holding any other public office in North Carolina in the future. Considering his conviction near-certain, Holden did not attend the vote; he was in Washington, D.C., hoping to meet with Grant to warn him of the ailing status of Reconstruction in his state. He later moved to Washington and briefly worked as a newspaper editor before Grant appointed him as a postmaster in Raleigh. During proceedings taken against men suspected of killing Outlaw in 1873, he publicly came out against their conviction, saying, "Those crimes were not committed in ordinary times [...] I am in favor of amnesty, oblivion, and mercy to the guilty."

During the impeachment trial the General Assembly repealed the Shoffner Act and greatly revised the militia law. Though they subsequently passed a measure prohibiting secret organizations, Klan activity persisted in southwestern North Carolina into 1872. Caldwell, who had assumed the governorship upon Holden's removal, was wary of taking any harsh measures and instead simply made public appeals to reject the Klan. He also relied more on the army to take action, which it did due to encouragement from Congress. Meanwhile, in the latter part of 1872, Judge Albion W. Tourgée issued indictments against 14 to 18 men for the murder of Outlaw. In 1873, the General Assembly passed the Amnesty Act, which exonerated persons found responsible for political violence in the preceding years; the Conservative-backed measure was designed to protect members of the Klan, and ended Tourgée's efforts. Federal military occupation in North Carolina ended in 1877.

== Legacy ==
=== Political effects ===
Although no Klansmen arrested in the affair were ultimately convicted of any crimes, Klan activity ceased in Alamance and Caswell counties after the Kirk–Holden war. On January 1, 1871, Holden sent Grant a collection of documents including his proclamations, affidavits, trial records, and Klan confessions. Grant turned the documents over to Congress, and the U.S. Senate subsequently appointed a select committee to investigate the events in Alamance and Caswell counties. Testimony about Klan activity in Alamance and Caswell before congressional committees also informed the passage of the Enforcement Act of 1871, and the seriousness of events there convinced Grant to pursue more direct federal action that year.

The Republican Party in North Carolina was crippled by the image of the Kirk–Holden war and Holden's impeachment. Holden was the first governor in the United States to be impeached and removed from office. Caldwell, a Republican, was elected to a full term as governor in 1872, but Democrats retained control of the General Assembly and severely curtailed his influence. Another Republican was not elected to the governorship until 1896. Holden remained hopeful that his decision to use the militia would later be vindicated and maintained throughout the rest of his life that he had done nothing wrong during the Kirk–Holden war. He defended his actions in his memoirs (written in 1889/1890 and published posthumously), writing that "the object of all this [was] to restore peace and good order. Every citizen, no matter of what color, or how poor or humble, has a right to labor for a living without being molested; to express his political opinions without let or hindrance; and to be absolutely at peace in his own house."

=== Fate of Holden's impeachment ===
A Republican representative introduced a resolution in 1872 to remove restrictions on Holden's political participation in the state. The Conservative majority voted it down, arguing that only a constitutional convention had the authority to grant such relief. Republicans tried again to offer clemency with a proposed ordinance at the state's 1875 constitutional convention, but it failed in a party-line vote to the slight Conservative majority. Holden quashed two similar efforts by Republican legislators in the 1880s to avoid stirring political controversy. He publicly supported a final, unsuccessful effort in 1889 to remove his political disabilities.

In March 2011, after Republicans regained control of the state senate for the first time since the 1800s, Republican State Senator Neal Hunt introduced a resolution to pardon Holden, arguing that he had taken the right course of action and that the legislators who impeached him had nefarious motives. The Caswell County Historical Association lobbied to delay the passage of the resolution, with its president arguing that the impeachment was justifiable due to Holden's illegal actions and that Klan pressure and racial tensions were not a significant factor in the proceedings. A legislative aide placed negative pamphlets about Holden on senators' desks and resigned after being publicly identified. On April 12, the North Carolina Senate convened in a special session in the Capitol Building and voted unanimously to pardon him. The resolution required approval from the House of Representatives in order to be put into effect, but the House did not consider the measure.

=== Historiography and commemoration ===
The Dunning School historian J. G. de Roulhac Hamilton devoted several chapters of his 1914 book Reconstruction in North Carolina to an account of the Kirk–Holden war, framing the deployment of the militia as an attempt by Republicans to interfere in local elections. In 1936, the state of North Carolina erected a highway historical marker in front of the Caswell County Courthouse, noting Stephens's murder and its role in sparking the Kirk–Holden war. Another marker was erected in Graham in 2006 to commemorate the event as a whole, near where Outlaw was hanged, though at the behest of the Graham Historical Society, Outlaw was not mentioned on the sign.

== Works cited ==
- Allen, Sylvester Jr.; Boggs, Belle (2026). The legend of Wyatt Outlaw: from Reconstruction through Black Lives Matter. Chapel Hill: The University of North Carolina Press. ISBN 978-1-4696-8999-9.
- Ashe, Samuel A'Court (1925). History of North Carolina. Vol. II. Raleigh: Edwards & Broughton. OCLC 244120893.
- Balanoff, Elizabeth (January 1972). "Negro Legislators in the North Carolina General Assembly, July, 1868-February, 1872". The North Carolina Historical Review. 49 (1): 22–55. JSTOR 23529002.
- Bogue, Jesse Parker Jr. (1973). Violence and Oppression in North Carolina During Reconstruction, 1865-1873 (PhD thesis). University of Maryland. OCLC 14990753.
- Bradley, Mark L. (2015). The Army and Reconstruction, 1865-1877. Washington, D.C.: Center of Military History, United States Army. ISBN 9780160928727.
- Bradley, Mark L. (2009). Bluecoats and Tar Heels: Soldiers and Civilians in Reconstruction North Carolina. Lexington: The University of Kentucky Press. ISBN 978-0-8131-2507-7.
- Brisson, Jim D. (April 2011). "'Civil Government Was Crumbling Around Me': The Kirk-Holden War of 1870". The North Carolina Historical Review. 8 (2): 123–163. JSTOR 23523540.
- Crow, Jeffrey J.; Durden, Robert F. (1977). Maverick Republican in the Old North State: A Political Biography of Daniel L. Russell. Baton Rouge: Louisiana State University Press. ISBN 9780807102916.
- Dial, Adolph L.; Eliades, David K. (1996). The Only Land I Know: A History of the Lumbee Indians (1st Syracuse University Press ed.). Syracuse: Syracuse University Press. ISBN 9780815603603.
- Evans, William McKee (2015). To Die Game: The Story of the Lowry Band, Indian Guerillas of Reconstruction (reprint ed.). Syracuse: Syracuse University Press. ISBN 9780815603061.
- Harris, William C. (October 1982). "William Woods Holden: In Search of Vindication". The North Carolina Historical Review. 59 (4): 354–372. JSTOR 23521800.
- McGuire, Samuel B. (May 2012). "'Rally Union Men in Defence of your State!': Appalachian Militiamen in the Kirk-Holden War, 1870". Appalachian Journal. 39 (3): 294–323. ISSN 0090-3779.
- McGuire, Samuel B. (July 2014). "The Making of a Black Militia Company: New Bern Troops in the Kirk-Holden War, 1870". The North Carolina Historical Review. 91 (3): 288–322. JSTOR 44113199.
- Nash, Steven E. (2016). Reconstruction's Ragged Edge: The Politics of Postwar Life in the Southern Mountains. Chapel Hill: The University of North Carolina Press. ISBN 9781469626246.
- Raper, Horace W. (1985). William W. Holden: North Carolina's Political Enigma. Chapel Hill: University of North Carolina Press. ISBN 0807850608.
- Trelease, Allen W. (1991). The North Carolina Railroad, 1849–1871, and the Modernization of North Carolina. Chapel Hill: The University of North Carolina Press. ISBN 0-8078-1941-7.
- Watson, Alan D. (1987). A History of New Bern and Craven County. New Bern: Tryon Palace Commission. OCLC 17398679.
- Wise, Jim (2010). Murder in the Courthouse: Reconstruction and Redemption in the North Carolina Piedmont. Charleston: The History Press. ISBN 9781596297555.
- Zuber, Richard L. (1969). North Carolina during Reconstruction. Raleigh: North Carolina Department of Archives and History. ISBN 9780865260894.
