= Abial W. Fisher =

American military officer and politician

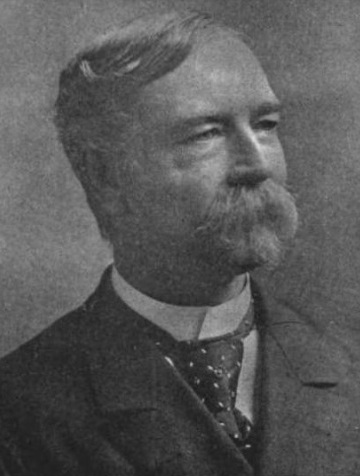

Adjutant General of North Carolina
- In office August 1868 – August 10, 1871
- Appointed by: Governor William W. Holden
- Succeeded by: John C. Gorman

Personal details
- Born: February 19, 1834 Danville, Vermont, US
- Died: March 26, 1895 (aged 61) Washington, D. C., US
- Resting place: Danville Green Cemetery, Danville, Vermont, US
- Party: Republican
- Spouse: Violetta R. Morse
- Children: 3
- Education: Dartmouth College

Abial Walstein Fisher (February 19, 1834 – March 26, 1895) was an American military officer and politician. Born in Vermont, he was educated at Dartmouth College and licensed to practice law. Following the outbreak of the American Civil War, he joined the Union Army, attaining the rank of captain and serving with the 4th Vermont Infantry Regiment. At the conclusion of the war, Fisher moved to North Carolina and joined the Republican Party, serving in the state's 1868 constitutional convention and briefly serving in the North Carolina General Assembly. From 1868 to 1871 he served as Adjutant General of North Carolina and directed efforts to suppress the Ku Klux Klan. Following his resignation from office in North Carolina, Fisher moved to Washington D. C. and found work in the Bureau of Pensions. He died there in 1895.

== Early life ==
Abial Walstein Fisher was born in Danville, Vermont on February 19, 1834. Educated at Phillips Academy in Danville, he graduated from Dartmouth College in 1858. He subsequently farmed and served as principal of Phillips Academy while studying law with attorney Bliss N. Davis. He was admitted to the bar in June 1861.

Fisher married Violetta R. Morse on September 11, 1861. They subsequently had three children.

== Civil War ==
Following the outbreak of the American Civil War, Fisher enlisted in Company K, 4th Vermont Infantry Regiment in August 1861. On 12 September, he was commissioned as a first lieutenant in Company H and he was later promoted to captain. He received a severe head wound during the Battle of the Wilderness in May 1864 and was discharged in September. He subsequently served in the Veteran Reserve Corps.

== Reconstruction ==
Following the war, Fisher moved to Bladenboro, North Carolina and worked in the lumber industry. Joining the Republican Party, he served as a delegate of Bladen County to the 1868 state constitutional convention and served in the North Carolina General Assembly from 1870 to 1871. He otherwise played little political role in the region.

Following the passage of a new state militia law, Fisher was appointed Adjutant General of North Carolina by Governor William Woods Holden in August 1868. In response to growing violence from the Ku Klux Klan, in February 1869, the General Assembly passed a law authorizing the governor to create a state detective force to apprehend fugitives. Holden subsequently placed Fisher in charge of the detectives. In that capacity, he issued a circular to the detectives outlining their responsibilities. They wrote him weekly summaries of their activities. The detectives arrested almost 50 suspects over the following months, but Klan violence persisted. In January 1870, the General Assembly passed the Shoffner Act, which empowered the governor to declare a state of insurrection and call up militia to enforce the law.

Klan violence in the Piedmont worsened after the passage of the Shoffner Act. Early in the morning on February 26, 1870, about 100 masked Klansmen rode to Graham, Alamance County, and lynched Wyatt Outlaw, a town commissioner and leading black figure in the county's Republican Party chapter. On March 7, Holden declared Alamance to be in a state of insurrection. He wrote to U.S. President Ulysses S. Grant to ask for support and dispatched Fisher to Richmond, Virginia, to speak with Major General Edward Canby, commander of the Second Military District, to appeal for reinforcements from the United States Army. Canby was not convinced that Alamance County was truly experiencing an insurrection and told Fisher that only the president could send more forces. On May 21, the Republican State Senator of Caswell County, John W. Stephens, was murdered by the Klan in Yanceyville.

On June 8, Holden hosted a meeting of Republicans in Raleigh to discuss the situation in Caswell County. Fisher was among them. They devised a plan to raise a state militia of Union war veterans and Republicans from the western and eastern reaches of the state to intervene in Caswell and Alamance counties, secure Raleigh, and then guard polling places in the upcoming August state elections. In what became known as the "Kirk–Holden war", the militia was deployed and made numerous arrests but their action, as well as their initial refusal to honor writs of habeas corpus, stoked intense political controversy. Democrats won a majority of the seats in the legislature in the August elections, and the North Carolina House of Representatives subsequently impeached Holden on a series of charges related to the use of the militia.

In preparation for the impeachment trial scheduled to begin in January 1871, Holden handed over governing authority to Lieutenant Governor Tod Robinson Caldwell. At the request of Caldwell, in January 1871, Fisher turned over records relating to the state detectives to the governor which were then supplied to the House of Representatives. Holden was ultimately convicted by the State Senate and removed from office. Fisher resigned as adjutant general on August 10, 1871.

== Later life ==
Following his resignation from office in North Carolina, Fisher moved to Washington D. C. and found work as a special agent of the Bureau of Pensions. He was promoted to the role of chief clerk in 1881 and served in that capacity until he was made a chief examiner and placed on the Pension Bureau's board of review. While living in Washington he made trips to Danville with his family during the summers. After suffering a stroke the day before, Fisher died in Washington D.C. on March 26, 1895.

== Works cited ==
- Brisson, Jim D. (April 2011). "'Civil Government Was Crumbling Around Me': The Kirk-Holden War of 1870". The North Carolina Historical Review. 8 (2): 123–163. JSTOR 23523540.
- Evans, William McKee (1995). Ballots and Fence Rails: Reconstruction on the Lower Cape Fear (reprint ed.). Athens: University of Georgia Press. ISBN 0-8203-1731-4.
- Gerould, Samuel L. (1905). Biographical Sketches of the Class of 1858 Dartmouth College. Nashua, New Hampshire: Telegraph Publishing Company.
- Massengill, Stephen E. (1985). "The Detectives of William W. Holden, 1869–1870". North Carolina Historical Review. 62 (4): 448–487. ISSN 0029-2494. JSTOR 23518497.
- McGuire, Samuel B. (May 2012). "'Rally Union Men in Defence of your State!': Appalachian Militiamen in the Kirk-Holden War, 1870". Appalachian Journal. 39 (3): 294–323. ISSN 0090-3779.
- Raper, Horace W. (1985). William W. Holden: North Carolina's Political Enigma. Chapel Hill: University of North Carolina Press. ISBN 0807850608.
- Scott, Robert N., ed. (1902). The War of the Rebellion: a Compilation of the Official Records of the Union and Confederate Armies. Vol. XXXVI (additions and corrections ed.). Washington D. C.: Government Printing Office.
