= 3rd North Carolina Mounted Infantry =

- Active: June 11, 1864, to August 8, 1865
- Country: United States
- Allegiance: (United States) Union
- Branch: Mounted Infantry
- Engagements: Raid on Camp Vance; Battle of Bull's Gap; Battle of Red Banks; Stoneman's Raid (1864); Stoneman's Raid (1865)

The 3rd North Carolina (Volunteer) Mounted Infantry (3rd NCMI) was an all-volunteer mounted infantry regiment that served in the Union Army during the American Civil War. The regiment was predominantly composed of Union Loyalists from North Carolina, but also included volunteers from Tennessee and several other states.

The 3rd NCMI, under the command of Colonel George Washington Kirk, became associated with unconventional and guerrilla-like tactics. Consequently, the regiment became known as Kirk's Raiders and the men were labeled bushwackers. The members of the regiment were also known as mountaineers because the majority of the men hailed from the Blue Ridge Mountains of Western North Carolina and East Tennessee.

== Service ==
=== February 1864 - Formation ===
The 3rd North Carolina Mounted Infantry was formed by Special Order Number 44, on February 13, 1864, when Major General John Schofield ordered Major George W. Kirk to raise 200 men to;

"... descend upon the rear of the rebel army under [Gen. James] Longstreet and destroy as much as possible of his stores and means of transportation ... [Y]ou will move along the railroad into Virginia, damaging the road as much as possible by burning bridges, trestle-work, water tanks, cars, etc., and by tearing up the track ..."

From June, 1864 until February, 1865, the 3NCMI was attached to the 2nd Brigade, 4th Division, 23rd Army Corps, Department of Ohio. From March, 1865 until August, 1865 the regiment was attached to the 2nd Brigade, 4th Division, District East Tennessee, Department of the Cumberland.

=== June 1864 - Raid on Camp Vance ===
Camp Vance, located near Morganton, North Carolina, and named for Zebulon B. Vance, a North Carolina wartime governor, was a training camp for Confederate conscripts. The 3rd NCMI easily captured the camp, but did not achieve its primary mission to destroy the railroad bridge over the Yadkin River north of Salisbury, North Carolina. They did destroy a nearby train, and inflicted significant damage to the engine. All buildings in the compound were destroyed, except for the hospital. Living up to their name as raiders a newspaper report at the time states the union soldiers robbed everyone present, stole all the horses and mules, and looted and divided the contents of the depot before burning it. It was also reported that many of those captured were able to escape while the Union troops made their retreat crossing the Catawba River.

Although the camp had been taken without a shot, several skirmishes ensued upon their retreat. William Waightstill Avery, a prominent North Carolina politician and lawyer, died from a wound he received in an encounter with Kirk's men shortly after the initial raid. On their way through Mitchell County, they burned the home and out buildings of the commandant of the local military district, Colonel John B. Palmer.

=== November 1864 - Bulls Gap ===
Was a battle of the American Civil War, occurring from November 11 to November 13, 1864, in Hamblen County and Greene County, Tennessee.

=== December 1864 - Red Banks ===
On December 29, 1864, the Third Regiment of North Carolina mounted an infantry under Colonel George W. Kirk, engaged about 400 Confederate Infantry and Cavalry under Lt. Colonel James A. Keith at Red Banks of the Nolichucky. Seventy-three Confederates were killed and thirty-two officers and privates were captured. The Union forces sustained only three wounded men. Tennessee Historical Marker 1A115 was erected to commemorate the incident.

=== March 1865 - Stoneman's Raid ===
In support of Major General George H. Stoneman's order to disrupt railroads in Southwest Virginia and North Carolina, Kirk and his men were assigned to hold Deep and Watauga Gaps near Boone, North Carolina. This was necessary to keep the mountain roads open for Stoneman's men when their mission was complete.

=== May 1865 - Destruction of Cherokee County Courthouse ===
On May 4, 1865, right after the Civil War ended, the Cherokee County Courthouse in Murphy, North Carolina, was burned down by raiders under Kirk's command. Kirk did not yet know of the Confederacy's surrender. Some of the raiders reportedly had pending criminal cases stored inside the courthouse.

=== August 1865 - Discharge ===
The regiment was mustered out on August 8, 1865.

== Total strength and casualties ==
There were 960 men (including at least one woman) in the 3rd North Carolina Mounted Infantry throughout the war. Sixteen were confirmed killed in action, and 23 were captured.

=== Commanders ===
- Colonel George Washington Kirk (originally a Major, became Lieutenant Colonel; September 20, 1864, Colonel; March 14, 1865)
- Lieutenant Colonel Robert W. Hubbard
- Major William W. Rollins
- Captain John W. Edwards
- Captain Laban W. McInturff
- Captain William W. Moore
- Captain Robert J. Morrison
- Captain John H. Ray
- Captain Stephen Street
- Captain William B. Underwood

=== Other notable unit members ===
- Malinda Blalock, one of the few female soldiers to fight in the war. She fought side-by-side with her husband, initially on the side of the South. When the opportunity arose, they joined Kirk's forces.

== See also ==
- North Carolina in the American Civil War
- List of North Carolina Union Civil War regiments
- Tennessee in the American Civil War, especially Unionism and East Tennessee
- Kirk-Holden war (post-Civil War involvement of Colonel George W. Kirk)
- Bushwacker
