= George Washington Kirk =

American Civil War soldier (1837–1905)

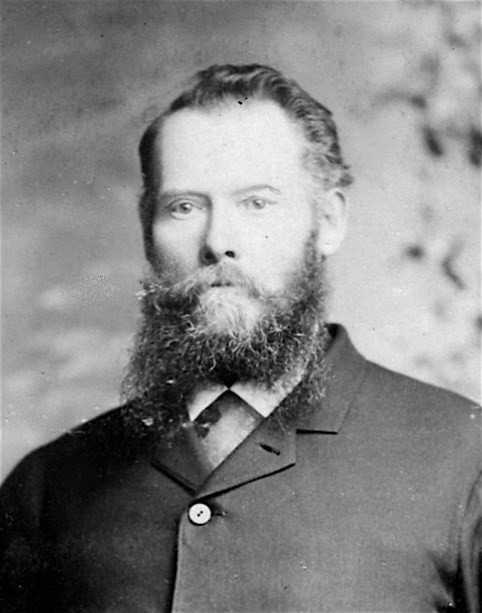
- Born: June 10, 1837; Greene County, Tennessee, U.S.
- Died: February 17, 1905 (aged 67); Gilroy, California, U.S.
- Spouse: Maria Louise Jones
- Military career
- Allegiance: Confederate States of America; United States
- Branch: Confederate States Army; United States Army
- Service years: (Confederate States of America) 1861–62 (United States) 1862–65
- Rank: Colonel
- Commands: 3rd North Carolina Mounted Infantry
- Conflicts: American Civil War: Battle of Red Banks; Reconstruction era: Kirk–Holden war

George Washington Kirk (June 10, 1837 – February 17, 1905) was a soldier who served in American Civil War. Born and raised in Tennessee, he married Maria Louisa Jones in 1860. At the start of the war he served in the Confederate States Army, but his views were Unionist and he left the state to join the Union Army. Advancing to the rank of colonel, in 1864 he raised the 3rd North Carolina Mounted Infantry (Union) and led many raids into North Carolina. Because of the regiment's guerrilla-like tactics, the regiment became known as Kirk's Raiders. In May 1865, Col. G.W. Kirk received the surrender of Walker’s Battalion of the Thomas Legion in Franklin, North Carolina. This is considered to be one of the last formal surrender of Confederates.

In 1870, Kirk was tasked by North Carolina Governor William Woods Holden to raise and lead a militia into Alamance and Caswell counties to quell the Ku Klux Klan. Though he was successful in breaking up Klan activity, none of the 100 men he arrested were charged by local authorities. In addition, the action led to Kirk's own arrest, and the impeachment of Governor Holden. With the help of the United States Marshal, Kirk was able to escape from jail, and later was given a position as a police officer with the capital force in Washington, D.C.

In 1890, it was reported that "several very rich finds" of gold, in the Maryland hills near the Potomac River, were discovered, and "being worked", on Kirk's land. He died on February 17, 1905 in Gilroy, California.

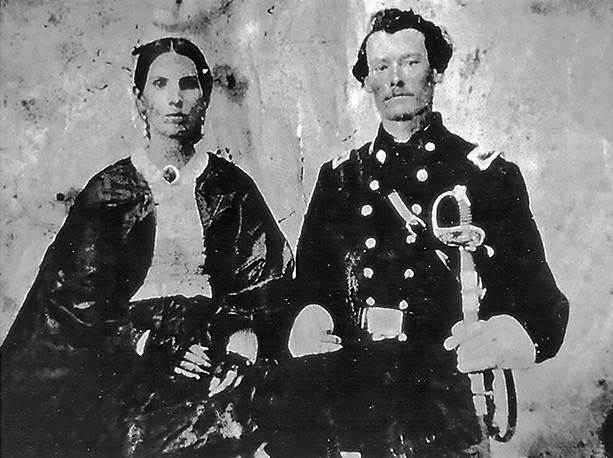
Kirk with his wife Mariah Louisa Kirk

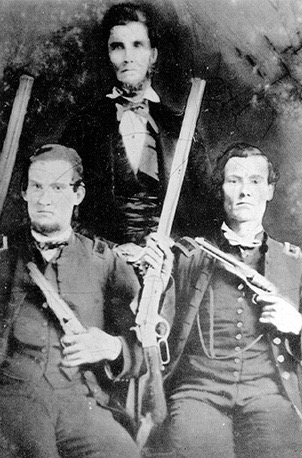
Kirk with his father Alexander (standing) and brother John (seated left)

== See also ==
- Irene Triplett
