= North Carolina Standard =

The North Carolina Standard
- Founded: 1834
- Ceased publication: December 1870
- Language: English
- Headquarters: Raleigh, North Carolina

The North Carolina Standard was a newspaper based in Raleigh, North Carolina. (Note: The paper had various names and titles for its editions during its existence: Weekly North Carolina Standard (1850-1858), the Semi-Weekly North-Carolina Standard (1852-1853), the Semi-Weekly Standard (1853-1865), the Weekly Standard (1858-1865), the Daily North-Carolina Standard (1865-68), the Weekly North-Carolina Standard (1866-1869), the North Carolina Standard (daily, 1868-1869), the Tri-Weekly Standard (1866-1868), the North Carolina Standard (weekly edition, 1866-1869), the Daily Standard (1869-1870), and the Weekly Standard (1869-1870).)

== History ==
=== Creation and early years ===
In 1834, Philo White moved to Raleigh, North Carolina, and established the North Carolina Standard. He had an aggressive editorial style, and within a year the paper had become the preeminent standard-bearer of the cause of the Democratic Party in the state. His political involvement also garnered him appointment as state printer. In 1836, White sold the paper to Thomas Loring, an investor and publisher of the paper. Loring was a staunch supporter of journalistic ethics and brought a more moderate tone to the paper's editorials. The milder political coverage, the Panic of 1837, and Democratic losses in the state contributed to a decline in the paper's fortunes. In 1842, the paper declared that it had lost $6,000 over a period of five and a half years due to lack of payment from subscribers. Later that year the publication dropped 677 subscribers for failure to pay.

Democratic politicians grew dissatisfied with Loring's management of the Standard, blaming the paper's lack of coordination with them for its electoral losses. In September 1840, the paper announced that editorial control would pass to Henry I. Toole while Loring was out of town. Toole eventually became associate editor and, though young and inexperienced, his energetic style drew the interest of Democratic leaders. They proposed Toole assume the role of editor. In response, Loring offered to sell it to Toole, but Toole found the terms unfavorable. Democratic leaders briefly mooted creating a new paper to serve the interests of their party before Loring reduced his price, but by then Toole had lost interest. Regardless, the affair further reduced Loring's interest in advocating for the Democratic Party. The influence of the Standard declined further and, in 1843, Loring's position with Democratic leaders was completely broken when a legislator criticized his editorial stance over a state bank controversy.

=== Acquisition by Holden ===
The increasing decline of the Standard's fortunes and the growing rupture with Loring prompted Democratic leaders to renew their search for a prospective editor. After ruling out Perrin Busbee of Raleigh as too aristocratic for their liking, James B. Shepard convinced the Democrats to consider offering the job to William Woods Holden, a young printer and lawyer who had previous involvement in Whig Party-aligned publications. The exact nature of the offer to Holden and his decision to alter his political allegiances are not known, though Shepard reportedly accompanied him on a walk in Raleigh and offered him the role of editor and owner in exchange of assurances that he would support the Democratic Party. Holden later stated that he was already growing disillusioned with the Whigs and found Democratic stances more to his liking. With Shepard's assistance, Holden secured the necessary loans to purchase the paper. The sale was announced in the May 31, 1843 edition of the Standard and Holden assumed the responsibilities as editor the following day.

In an editorial in his first edition of the Standard, Holden endorsed the Democratic Party for supporting state's rights and advocating for "the many against the few", and he soon thereafter adopted "The many instead of the few" as the publication's official slogan. Under his direction the Standard garnered praise as a quality paper, displaying text with minimal errors and clearly written while sensitive to avoid vulgarity, though Holden often used sarcasm in his editorials to criticize political opponents. Sessions of the North Carolina General Assembly were covered in detail and a news on the federal government from Washington D. C. was supplied in weekly letters from a correspondent. Holden's early editorials drew interest and replies in other state newspapers, though it took several months for the number of the Standard's subscribers to grow after he had assumed charge over it. Growing subscriptions allowed the paper to inaugurate a semi-weekly edition on November 6, 1850.

In 1854, Frank I. Wilson was hired to serve as an associate editor and business manager for the paper. He served in that capacity for five years and, upon his resignation, complete editorial control of the Standard returned to Holden.

In 1865, at the conclusion of the Civil War, Holden was appointed provisional governor of North Carolina and turned over control of the paper to his son, Joseph W. Holden, and Joseph S. Cannon. Following the onset of Congressional Reconstruction in 1867, the paper moved to support the Republican Party.

== Sale ==
Following his election as governor of North Carolina, Holden announced the sale of the paper to N. Paige and Company on July 13, 1868, which was a consortium of investors led by Nathaniel Paige, a New York newspaperman. He managed the paper directly until control was turned over to John B. Neathery in October. In August 1869, Neathery sold his interest in the paper to Milton S. Littlefield, who was later declared to be its publisher. Under his ownership, the paper became an organ of the state's Republican Party and launched a daily edition. Horace L. Pike served as editor.

By March 1870, Littlefield's involvement in a railroad bonds scandal had become public, and he sold the paper to Republican politician and president of the North Carolina Railroad William Alexander Smith. Smith hired Joseph Holden to serve as editor.

== Demise ==
Under Smith, the Standard suffered financially. In its September 21, 1870 edition, the paper declared that it would suspend publication due to "business complications". On October 5, it came back into print without Smith's name in the masthead with a declaration that, "when the necessary arrangements are perfected the publishers will be announced." It permantly ceased publication in December. Smith later said, "I stopped printing the Standard because you can't print a paper for a party that can't read."

With its demise, The Wilmington Post assumed the role of the state Republican Party's most prominent paper, while the Carolina Era introduced in Raleigh became the party's official voice. Smith used the offices and assets of the Standard to conduct some printing with his enterprise, W. A. Smith & Company. In 1871, Smith sold the building and its equipment to C. B. Edwards and Needham B. Broughton, who used the assets to establish the Edwards & Broughton Company, a book and job printing house.

== Works cited ==
- Abbott, Richard H. (2004). For Free Press and Equal Rights : Republican Newspapers in the Reconstruction South. University of Georgia Press. ISBN 9780820325279.
- Norton, Clarence Clifford (1928). The Democratic Party in Antebellum North Carolina : 1835–1861. Chapel Hill: The University of North Carolina Press.
- Crittenden, Christopher; Powell, William S.; Woody, Robert H., eds. (1971). 100 Years 100 Men : 1871-1971. Raleigh: Edwards & Broughton Company.
- Folk, Edgar Estes (January 1942). "W. W. Holden and the North Carolina Standard, 1843-1848: A Study in Political Journalism". The North Carolina Historical Review. 19 (1): 22–47. JSTOR 23515668.
- Folk, Edgar E.; Shaw, Bynum (1982). W. W. Holden: A Political Biography. Winston-Salem, North Carolina: John F. Blair. ISBN 0-89587-025-8.
- Raper, Horace W. (1985). William W. Holden: North Carolina's Political Enigma. Chapel Hill: University of North Carolina Press. ISBN 0807850608.
- Raper, Horace W.; Mitchell, Thornton W., eds. (2000). The Papers of William Woods Holden (1841–1868). Vol. 1. Raleigh: Division of Archives and History, North Carolina Department of Cultural Resources. ISBN 0-86526-292-6.
