= Thomas Samuel Ashe =

American judge

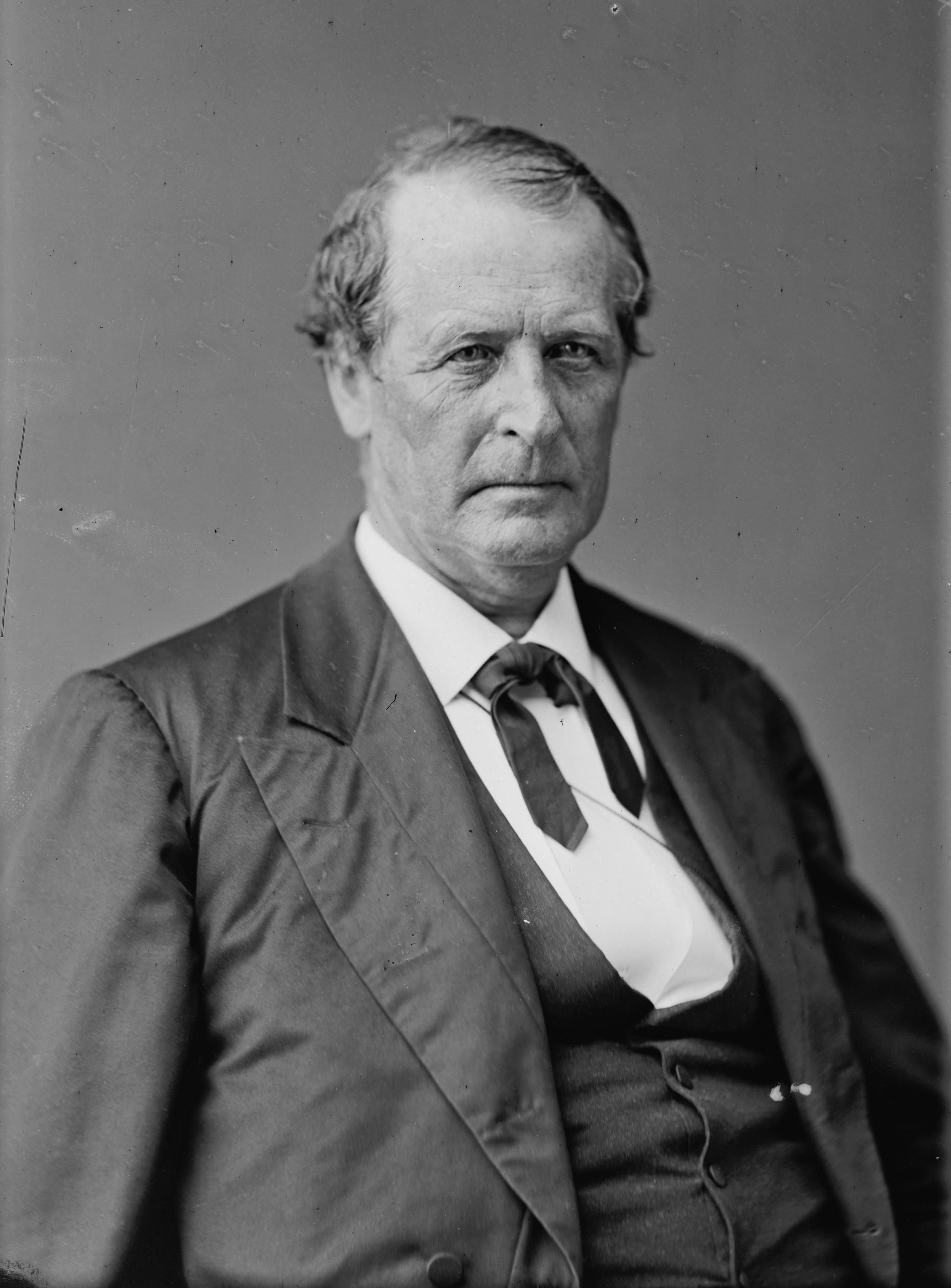
Thomas Samuel Ashe

Thomas Samuel Ashe (July 21, 1812 – February 4, 1887) was an American lawyer and politician who served in the Confederate Congress, and U.S. Congressman from North Carolina.

== Early years ==
Born in Hawfields, Orange County, North Carolina, he attended Bingham's Academy in Hillsborough, then the University of North Carolina at Chapel Hill, graduating in 1832. He was admitted to the bar in 1834 and began to practice law in Wadesboro, North Carolina in 1835.

Ashe owned slaves, with former slave of his Evelina Morgan (Dargan) sharing her Account of what life was like on the plantation when the Yankees had invaded his home while he fled. The title of the book is “Slave Narratives: a folk history of slavery in the United States from interviews with former slaves, volume two, Arkansas natives part five”.

== Politics ==
In 1842, Ashe was elected to a single term in the North Carolina House of Commons. From 1847 to 1851 he was solicitor of the fifth judicial district of North Carolina, and in 1854, he served in the North Carolina Senate. During the American Civil War, Ashe served in the Confederate House of Representatives from 1861 to 1864, and was elected to the Confederate Senate in 1864, but the war concluded before he was able to serve.

In 1868, Ashe ran unsuccessfully for Governor as the nominee of the Conservative Party, then the name of the state Democratic Party. He accepted the nomination only after Zebulon B. Vance and Augustus Merrimon declined to run. In this election, waged under the supervision of the U.S. military and allowing African Americans to vote in large numbers for the first time, Ashe was defeated by the Republican nominee, William Woods Holden. This was the same election in which the new state constitution was approved by the people. Ashe and the Conservatives opposed the new constitution.

Ashe was elected for two terms in the United States House of Representatives, serving from March 4, 1873, to March 3, 1877. Although he chose not to run again in 1876, he was elected an associate justice of the North Carolina Supreme Court in 1878 and re-elected in 1886.

== Death ==
Ashe was still serving on the court at the time of the death in Wadesboro in 1887.

Thomas Samuel Ashe was the cousin of fellow Congressmen John Baptista Ashe and William Shepperd Ashe.

Party political offices
Preceded by Jonathan Worth	Democratic nominee for Governor of North Carolina; 1868	Succeeded by Augustus Summerfield Merrimon
U.S. House of Representatives
Preceded by Francis E. Shober	Member of the U.S. House of Representatives from North Carolina's 6th congressional district 1873–1877	Succeeded by Walter L. Steele
