= William A. Moore (North Carolina politician) =

American lawyer, judge, confederate officer and politician (1831–1884)

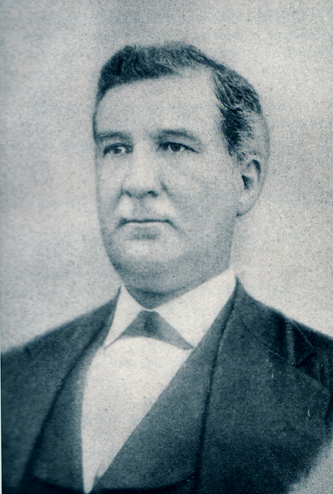

Member of the North Carolina House of Representatives
- In office 1869–1870

Speaker of the North Carolina House of Representatives
- In office 1870 – 2 weeks

Personal details
- Born: July 20, 1831 Edenton, North Carolina
- Died: December 20, 1884 (aged 53)
- Party: Initially Democrat then Republican

William Armistead Moore (July 20, 1831 – December 20, 1884) was a lawyer, judge, confederate officer, served in the North Carolina House of Representatives and as speaker of the North Carolina House of Representatives for two weeks in 1870.

== Biography ==
Moore was born July 20, 1831, to Susan Jordan Armistead and Augustus Moore in Edenton, North Carolina. He was educated at the Edenton Academy and studied at the University of North Carolina until 1851 when he left without graduating to take care of his families estate after his father died suddenly. He started to study law and passed the bar in 1852 ranking first in his class.

He practiced law until 1861 when he joined the Fifth Regiment of North Carolina militia of which he became the colonel and commander. He commanded four companies made up of around 200 men.

During his career he initially started as a Democrat attending the Democratic National Convention in Baltimore in 1860. He later became a Republican around 1868. In April 1884 it was noted and condemned that he was still actually a member of both the Republican and Liberal parties.

Moore held several positions during the Reconstruction era and he was elected to fill an unfinished term in the North Carolina House of Representatives in 1869 and was subsequently elected to serve the following term from 1869 to 1870. He served as Speaker of the North Carolina House of Representatives for the final two weeks of the session after Joseph W. Holden resigned.

He was listed as being appointed as a Brigadier General of the 2nd Militia Division by the governor June 1870.

In 1871 he was appointed as judge of the Second Judicial District by governor Tod Robinson Caldwell, replacing E. W. Jones who had resigned April 1, 1871. He was made Honorary Commissioner to the 1878 Exposition Universelle in Paris by president Rutherford B. Hayes.

He died December 20, 1884, from paralysis, and he is buried in St. Paul's Church, Edenton. He had never married and had no children.
