= John C. Gorman =

American military officer and politician

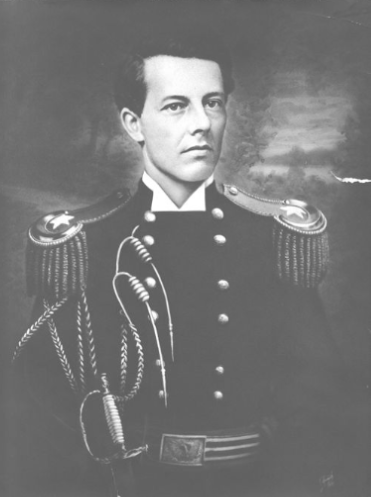
- Gorman in uniform as Adjutant General

Adjutant General of North Carolina
- In office August 14, 1871 – 1877
- Appointed by: Governor Tod Robinson Caldwell
- Preceded by: Abial W. Fisher
- Succeeded by: Johnston Jones

Mayor of Raleigh, North Carolina
- In office February 6, 1875 – May 4, 1875
- Preceded by: Joseph W. Holden
- Succeeded by: J. H. Separk

Personal details
- Born: November 1, 1835 Tuscaloosa, Alabama, US
- Died: December 27, 1892 (aged 57) Washington, D. C., US
- Resting place: Raleigh, North Carolina, US
- Party: Republican
- Spouse: Emma Boushall
- Children: 8

John Calvin Gorman (November 1, 1835 – December 27, 1892) was an American military officer, printer, and politician who served as Adjutant General of North Carolina from 1871 to 1877.

== Early life ==
John Calvin Gorman was born on November 1, 1835, to Thomas and Elizabeth Gorman in Tuscaloosa, Alabama, United States. His father, a carpenter, soon thereafter moved to North Carolina, dying in Wilmington. Elizabeth Gorman then moved to Raleigh, North Carolina with John and his sister.

As a youth, Gorman undertook an apprenticeship in printing at the offices of The Raleigh Register. Before completing it, he moved with his cousin to Kansas. In 1854 he returned to Raleigh, working for The Raleigh Register and freelancing as a journalist. He then moved to Beaufort to work as a journalist. While there, he met and married Emma Boushall, with whom he would have eight children.

== Military career ==
At the outbreak of the American Civil War in 1861, Gorman was living in Wilson. He subsequently joined Company B, 2nd Regiment, North Carolina Infantry of the Confederate States Army at the rank of lieutenant. He was promoted to the rank of captain in 1862. He was wounded during the battles of Sharpsburg and Fredericksburg before being captured by federal forces and imprisoned at Fort Delaware.

== Political activities ==
After the war, Gorman returned to Raleigh. He joined the Republican Party. Ideologically, Gorman was among his party's conservatives, advocating industrialization of the South, improved public education, increased rights and political representation for working class men, and a paternalistic relationship between elite whites and blacks. He served in the North Carolina House of Representatives as a representative of Beaufort County from 1866 to 1867 and again as a representative from Wake County from 1872 to 1874.

In 1867, Gorman joined with his brother-in-law John Nichols and their friend John Neathery to create the printing firm Nichols, Gorman, and Neathery. He and Nichols produced a Hand-Book for County Officers in 1868 and sold it at cost in the hopes of helping new Republicans elected to local offices. That year, Neathery was appointed state printer, and Nichols and Gorman used their print shop to assist him in issuing state publications. In 1871, Nichols and Gorman launched a newspaper, the Raleigh Daily Telegram, which they put forth as a politically independent publication. In it they condemned the Ku Klux Klan and Union League as extremist manifestations of the Conservative and Republican parties, respectively. They also postulated an economic vision for a postwar North Carolina, rooted in an agricultural system devoted to food production instead of cash crops and complimented by increasing industry. He was a member of the Raleigh Typographical Union No. 54 of the International Typographical Union and a leader in the Knights Local No. 3606 of the Knights of Labor. He served as the publisher of a local Knights newspaper, the Raleigh Workman.

In the late 1860s, Gorman served as the city of Raleigh's fire chief. On February 5, 1875, he was elected mayor of Raleigh by the city board of commissioners to fill the unexpired term of Joseph W. Holden, who had died in office. Gorman's election forced him to vacate his place on the board. He assumed office the following day. He was succeeded as mayor by J. H. Separk on May 4.

Governor Tod Robinson Caldwell appointed Gorman as Adjutant General of North Carolina on August 14, 1871, following the resignation of Abial W. Fisher. He shortly thereafter travelled to Robeson County to assess the ongoing Lowry War, a conflict between local authorities and outlaws of the Lowry Gang. While there, he promoted local militia captain Francis M. Wishart to the rank of colonel and instructed him to raise a permanent voluntary company of 50 militiamen to combat the gang with the assistance of 50 U.S. Army soldiers. Gorman would go on to spend five weeks in Robeson interviewing local residents, and came to advocate for compromise and conciliation as means of ending the conflict.

Through an intermediary, the Lowry Gang contacted Wishart and asked him to connect them with Gorman to negotiate a deal. Gorman met the outlaws alone in a swamp, where they maintained they were not guilty of some of the crimes ascribed to them, and claimed they had always acted in self-defense. They assured Gorman that they would not attack any U.S. troops, but told him that since they were unable to find work they would continue taking food and supplies from local farmers. They also indicated to him that they would leave the country if permitted. Gorman told them that he lacked the power to settle to their terms, but had several more meetings with the gang. The North Carolina General Assembly refused to offer terms to the outlaws, eventually choosing to increase bounties upon them in February 1872. Shortly thereafter, the Lowry Gang conducted a brazen robbery in Lumberton before gang leader Henry Berry Lowry disappeared. Several accounts, including Gorman's memoirs, maintain that Berry accidentally shot himself with his own gun. One nephew of Lowry maintained that Gorman helped to disguise the outlaw as a soldier and smuggled him out of the county.

Gorman served as adjutant general until 1877. (Note: According to John L. Cheney Jr., "Since there is no evidence that he resigned, his commission must have terminated." His successor, Johnston Jones, was appointed by Governor Zebulon Vance effective January 8, 1877.)

On June 20, 1877, Gorman was appointed special deputy collector of internal revenue for North Carolina. The following day, the National Republican ran an article attacking the credibility of J. G. Hester, a special deputy of the United States Department of Justice, signed "Tar Heel". The article criticized the removal of Asheville, North Carolina postmaster John Alphin Fagg due to accusations leveled by Hester and itself said that Hester possessed "no character among North Carolinians, at home or abroad, for honor and fair dealing". Afterwards, Hester went to the offices of the newspaper and gathered that Gorman was the author of the article. Hester swore out a warrant against Gorman for malicious libel and had him arrested at a hotel in Washington D. C. and brought to a police station, though a group of his friends—including United States Solicitor General Samuel F. Phillips—quickly arrived and posted his bail.

== Later life ==
Gorman moved to Washington D.C. in 1887 and found employment with the United States Government Printing Office. He began suffering the effects of heart disease in 1890. He died at his home in Washington D.C. due to the disease on December 27, 1892. His remains were buried in Raleigh. Per his request, he was interred with his body donning his Confederate States Army uniform.

== Works cited ==
- Beckel, Deborah (2011). Radical Reform: Interracial Politics in Post-Emancipation North Carolina. Charlottesville: University of Virginia Press. ISBN 978-0-8139-3002-2.
- Cheney, John L. Jr., ed. (1981). North Carolina Government, 1585-1979: A Narrative and Statistical History (revised ed.). Raleigh: North Carolina Secretary of State. OCLC 1290270510.
- Clark, Walter, ed. (1901). Histories of the Several Regiments and Battalions from North Carolina in the Great War, 1861–1865. Vol. I. Raleigh: State of North Carolina. LCCN 02026034.
- Dial, Adolph L.; Eliades, David K. (1996). The Only Land I Know: A History of the Lumbee Indians (1st Syracuse University Press ed.). Syracuse: Syracuse University Press. ISBN 9780815603603.
- Evans, William McKee (2015). To Die Game: The Story of the Lowry Band, Indian Guerillas of Reconstruction (reprint ed.). Syracuse: Syracuse University Press. ISBN 9780815603061.
