= Battle of Red Banks =

Battle in American Civil War

- Part of the American Civil War
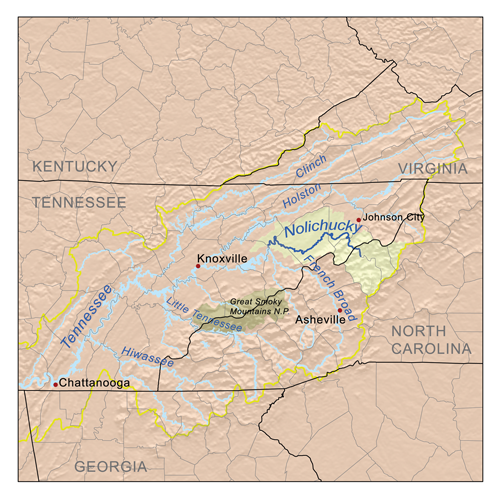
- Map of the Nolichucky River
| Date | December 29, 1864 |
| Location | Red Banks of the Nolichucky River, Tennessee, near the North Carolina line 36.123°N 82.443°W |
| Result | Union victory |

Belligerents
| United States (Union) | (Confederate States of America) Confederate States (Confederacy) |

Commanders and leaders
| George W. Kirk | James A. Keith |

Units involved
| 3rd North Carolina Mounted Infantry | 64th North Carolina Infantry |

Strength
| Around 960 | 400 |

Casualties and losses
| 3 wounded | 73 killed 32 captured |

The Battle of Red Banks was an American Civil War battle that took place on December 29, 1864, between Union and Confederate forces. It took place at the Red Banks of the Nolichucky River in Unicoi County, Tennessee near the North Carolina border. Southern soldiers referred to the conflict as the Battle of the Bloody Chucky.

Around 960 Union cavalry of the 3rd North Carolina Mounted Infantry under Colonel George Washington Kirk engaged about 400 Confederate troops of the 64th North Carolina Infantry under Colonel James A. Keith during an extended raid through western North Carolina, southwest Virginia and eastern Tennessee. After eliminating about a quarter of the Confederate troops and forcing the remainder to retreat, the Union Cavalry continued their intended march into Knoxville.
