= North Carolina National Guard =

Organized militia of the U.S. state of North Carolina

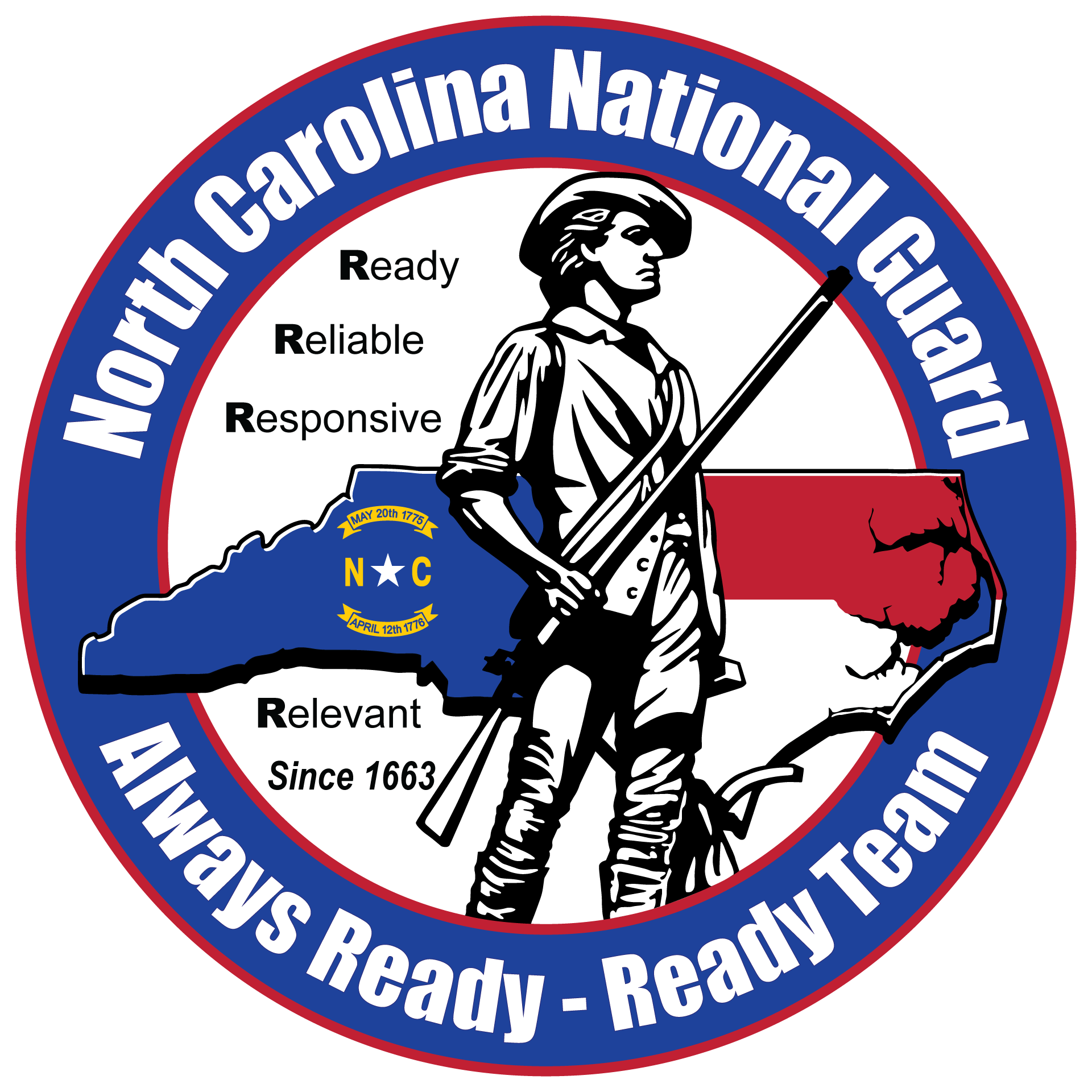
- Seal
- Active: 1663–present
- Country: United States
- Allegiance: North Carolina
- Branch: United States Army; U.S. Air Force
- Type: military reserve force, Organized Militia
- Role: "To meet state and federal mission responsibilities."
- Size: ~11,000 personnel
- Part of: National Guard Bureau; National Guard; North Carolina Department of Public Safety
- Headquarters: 1636 Gold Star Drive, Raleigh, North Carolina; 35°48′34.5″N 78°42′52.7″W
- Mottos: "Always Ready, Ready Team"
- Website: ng.nc.gov

Commanders
- Commander in Chief (Title 10 USC): President of the United States (when federalized)
- Commander in Chief (Title 32 USC): Governor of North Carolina
- Adjutant General: MG M. Todd Hunt

Insignia
- Abbreviation: NCNG

The North Carolina National Guard (NCNG), commonly known as the North Carolina guard, is the National Guard component of the state of North Carolina. It is composed of North Carolina Army National Guard and North Carolina Air National Guard. The adjutant general's office is located in Raleigh.

== History ==
The North Carolina National Guard, or Carolina militia as it was originally known, was born from the Carolina Charter of 1663. The charter gave to the Proprietors the right "to Leavy Muster and Trayne all sortes of men of what Condition or wherefoever borne in the said Province for the tyme being".

The North Carolina National Guard was formerly headquartered at the Durham Armory in Durham, North Carolina.

During the COVID-19 pandemic in North Carolina, the North Carolina National Guard was activated to assist in logistics and transportation of medical supplies, as the state reported it had 179 cases.

== Mission ==
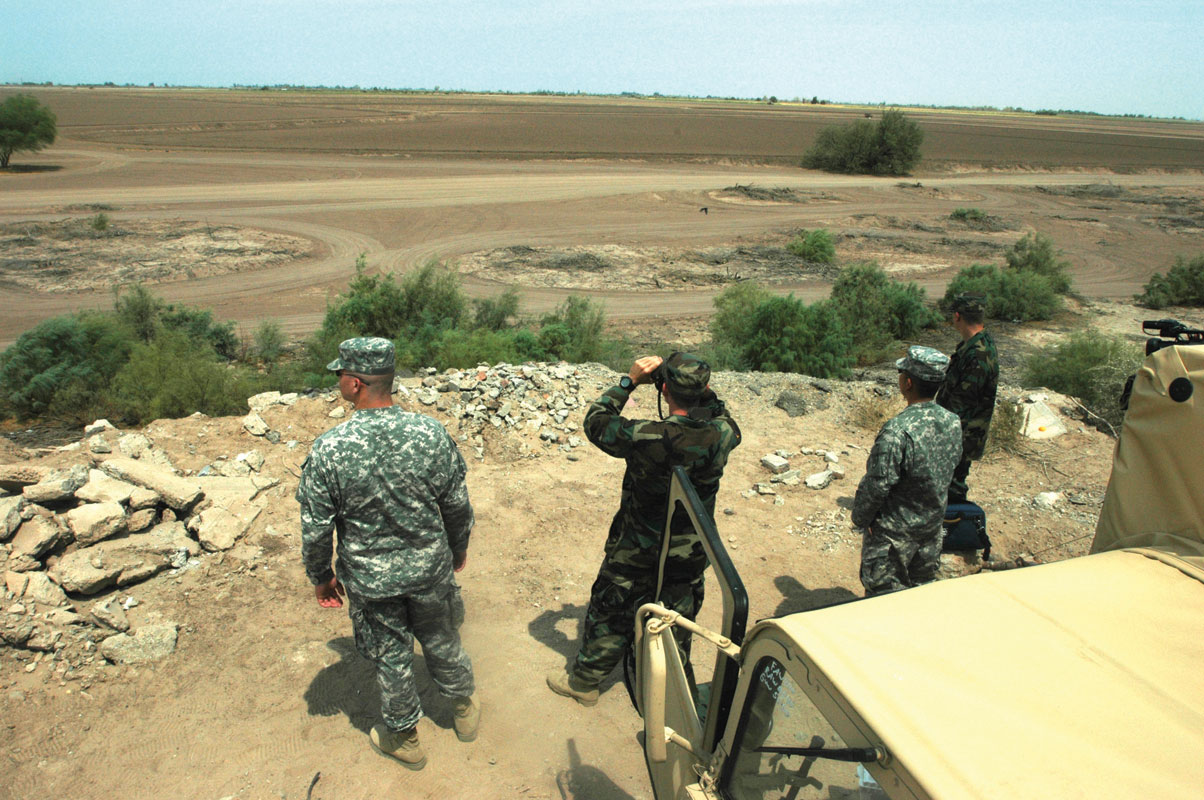
National Guardsmen at the Mexico-US border

The Constitution of the United States specifically charges the National Guard with dual federal and state missions. Other than state defense forces and the state defense militias, the National Guard is the only United States military force empowered to function in a state status.

Those functions range from limited actions during non-emergency situations to full-scale law enforcement of martial law when local law enforcement officials can no longer maintain civil control. The National Guard may be called into federal service in response to a call by the President or Congress.

The federal mission assigned to the National Guard is: "To provide properly trained and equipped units for prompt mobilization for war, National emergency or as otherwise needed." The state mission assigned to the National Guard is: "To provide trained and disciplined forces for domestic emergencies or as otherwise provided by state law."

== Command structure ==
The Governor may call individuals or units of the North Carolina National Guard into state service during emergencies or to assist in special situations which lend themselves to use of the National Guard. When National Guard troops are called to federal service, the president serves as commander-in-chief.
