= Joseph W. Holden =

American politician

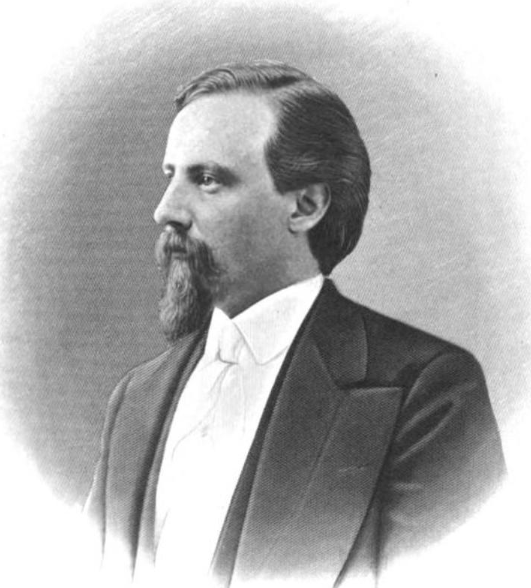

29th Mayor of Raleigh
- In office 1874–1875
- Preceded by: Wesley Whitaker
- Succeeded by: John C. Gorman

Speaker of the North Carolina House of Representatives
- In office 1868–1870
- Preceded by: Rufus Yancey McAden
- Succeeded by: William A. Moore

Member of the North Carolina House of Representatives from the Wake County district

Personal details
- Born: 1844
- Died: January 21, 1875 (aged 30–31)
- Party: Republican
- Parent: William Woods Holden

Military service
- Allegiance: Confederate States
- Branch/service: Confederate States Army

Joseph Woods Holden (c. 1844– January 21, 1875) was a newspaper editor and politician in North Carolina. He served as Speaker of the North Carolina House of Representatives and was mayor of Raleigh, North Carolina. He died at the age of 31. William Woods Holden who served as Governor of North Carolina was his father.

During the American Civil War, Holden served in the Confederate States Army and was captured by Union forces at Roanoke Island. In 1865, his father handed over to him the editorship of the North Carolina Standard. North Carolina's constitutional convention of 1868 appointed Holden to serve as its official "reporter", and his accounts of the sessions of the convention were printed in the Standard.

A Republican, he was elected in 1868 to the North Carolina House of Representatives from Wake County. Holden served as Speaker of the North Carolina House of Representatives while his party controlled the state legislature from 1868 to 1870. Over the course of his tenure, while remaining an able presiding officer, Holden grew consumed by the social trappings of his elevated position and became an alcoholic. In the summer of 1869, his family sent him to stay with family friend Thomas Settle in Wentworth to abstain from drinking and read law. By 1870, he had returned to Raleigh to write for the Standard. He resigned his seat in the House of Representatives effective March 18, 1870. In 1868, Holden was also a delegate to the Republican National Convention. In 1870, Holden lost a close race in a special election to the United States House of Representatives, the result of which he unsuccessfully contested.

After the Standard closed in December 1870, Holden moved to Washington D.C. He briefly worked for a U.S. Senate committee investigating the Ku Klux Klan, but, failing to find more steady work, relocated to Kansas and joined the staff of the Leavenworth Times. He was promoted to managing editor of the newspaper before poor health prompted him to return to Raleigh.

In May 1874, the Wake County Republican Party became beset by factionalism, with county sheriff Timothy F. Lee leading one convention and Holden leading another. From 1874 to 1875, he served as mayor of Raleigh, North Carolina.

Holden died at his father's house in Raleigh on January 21, 1875 at the age of 31. A funeral was held the following day. John C. Gorman was elected by the board of commissioners to succeed him as mayor of Raleigh.

Called "one of the most talented men that the State has ever produced" by a local historian, Holden, who was also a noted poet, died at age 31 in 1875.

== See also ==
- North Carolina General Assembly of 1868–1869

== Works cited ==
- Cheney, John L. Jr., ed. (1981). North Carolina Government, 1585-1979: A Narrative and Statistical History (revised ed.). Raleigh: North Carolina Secretary of State. OCLC 1290270510.
- Friedlander, Alan; Gerber, Richard Allen (2018). Welcoming Ruin : The Civil Rights Act of 1875 (ebook ed.). Brill. ISBN 9789004384071.
- Orth, John V. (September 1992). "Tuesday, February 11, 1868: The Day North Carolina Chose Direct Election of Judges--A Transcript of the Debates from the 1868 Constitutional Convention". North Carolina Law Review. 70 (6): 1825–1851.
- Raper, Horace W. (1985). William W. Holden: North Carolina's Political Enigma. Chapel Hill: University of North Carolina Press. ISBN 0807850608.
