= Adjutant General of North Carolina =

Head of the North Carolina National Guard

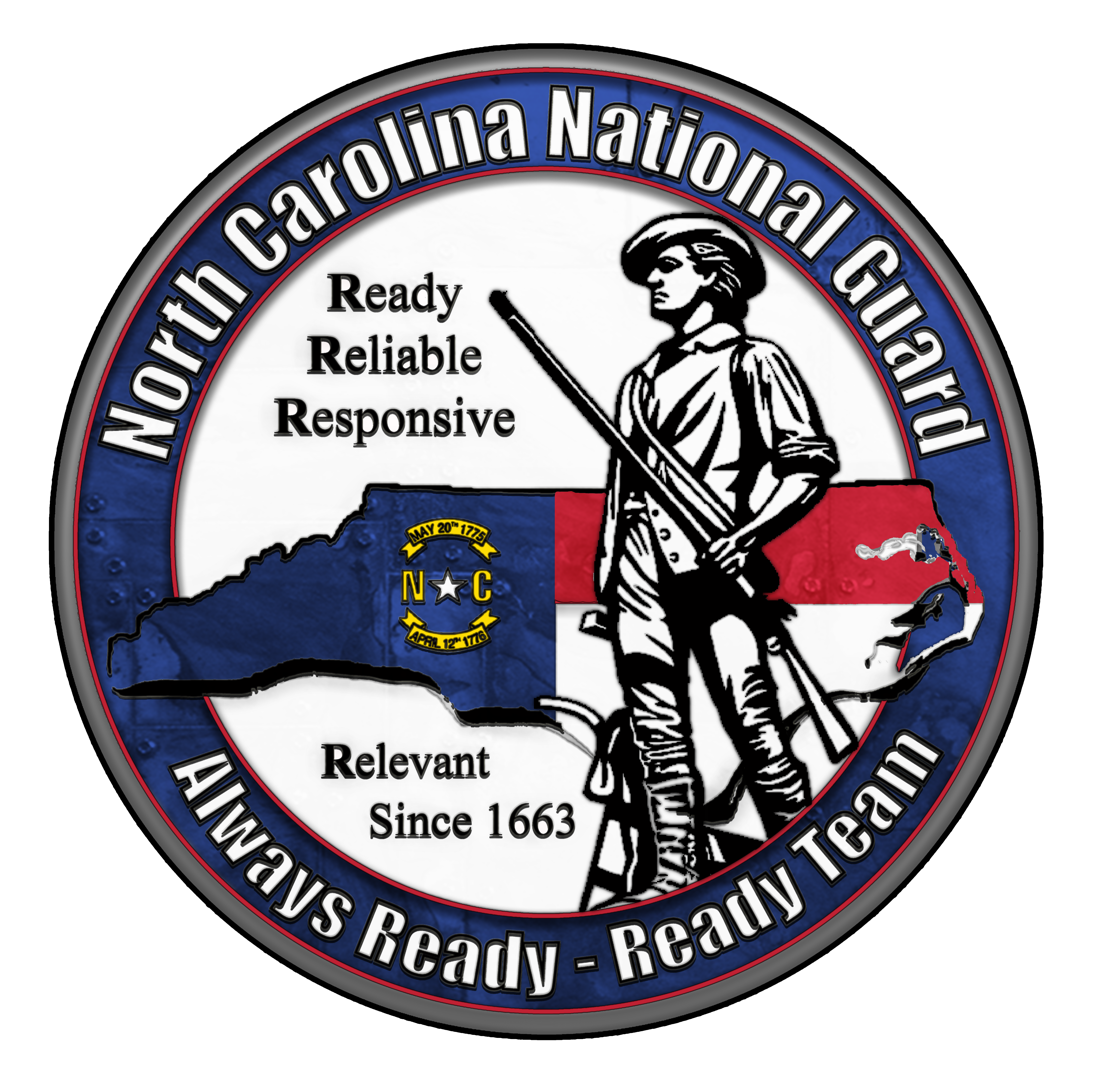
- Seal of the North Carolina National Guard

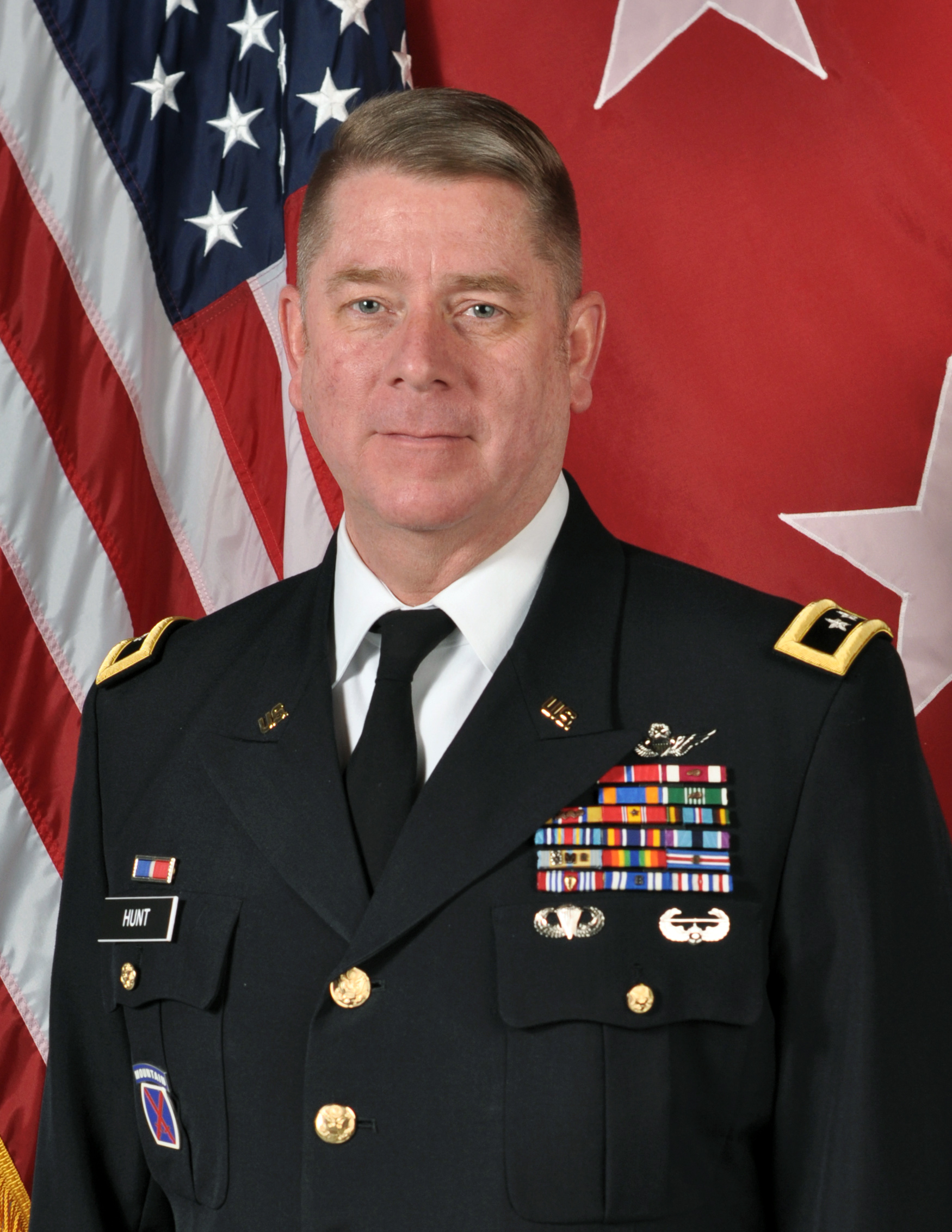
- Incumbent; Major General Todd Hunt, NCARNG since December 1, 2019
- Militia of North Carolina
- Member of: National Guard
- Reports to: The governor
- Seat: Raleigh, North Carolina
- Appointer: The governor; with Senate advice and consent
- Term length: No fixed term
- Inaugural holder: Brigadier General Benjamin Smith, North Carolina Militia
- Formation: 1806

The adjutant general of North Carolina, also known as the adjutant general of the North Carolina National Guard, is the head of the North Carolina National Guard. The position was established in 1806, when the Militia Acts of 1792 required each U.S. state to establish the position to better train the militia. The adjutant general is appointed by the North Carolina governor and requires five years prior military service.

== History ==
In its early history, North Carolina's militia lacked organization. The Militia Acts of 1792 and 1795 by the U.S. Congress, required the North Carolina General Assembly in 1806 to create the Adjutant General's Office to better organize and train the state militia. The statutory duties of the adjutant general were to pass orders from the governor to the militia, supplying forms to militia officers, attending reviews of forces, and reporting to the governor, the General Assembly, and the president of the United States. On February 16, 1859, the General Assembly repealed the portion of the state law which provided for the selection and compensation of the adjutant general, and the office was considered abolished. An acting adjutant general served between 1860 and 1861.

Shortly after North Carolina seceded from the United States in 1861 and joined the Confederate States, the General Assembly passed a new militia law which authorized an adjutant general to serve as quartermaster and paymaster general and chief of ordnance of North Carolina's forces. The defeat of the Confederacy left the militia and the Department of the Adjutant General disorganized. In 1877 the General Assembly reorganized the militia into the North Carolina State Guard, still under the leadership of the adjutant general. During the Spanish–American War of 1898, state guard forces were not called into federal service, but the Department of the Adjutant General reorganized the North Carolina forces to allow members to leave and volunteer for federal duty. In 1903 the name of the North Carolina State Guard was changed to North Carolina National Guard in compliance with federal legislation.

The adjutant general assisted with federal deployments of the National Guard during the Pancho Villa Expedition and World War I, and helped administer the Selective Service System. The Department of the Adjutant General also assisted with a post-war reorganization of the National Guard. In 1941 the General Assembly passed a law mandating that the adjutant general reestablished the State Guard while the state National Guard units were pressed into federal service, which had occurred due to the outbreak of World War II. The State Guard was disbanded in 1947 as the National Guard was relinquished from federal duty, and the adjutant general assisted with the post-war reorganization.

== Duties ==
The adjutant general, appointed by the governor, is director of the North Carolina National Guard. A candidate for the office is required to have at least five years of active service in the U.S. Armed Forces.

== List of adjutants general of North Carolina ==
This is a list of persons who have held the office of adjutant general of North Carolina.

Portrait	Name	County	Term
	Benjamin Smith	Brunswick County	1806–1807
	Edward Pasteur	Craven County	1807–1808
	Calvin Jones	Wake County	1808–1812
	Robert Williams	Surry County	1812–1821
	Beverly Daniel	Wake County	1821–1840
	Robert W. Haywood	Wake County	1840–1857
	Richard C. Cotten	Chatham County	1857–1859
	John Franklin Hoke	Lincoln County	1860–1861
	James Green Martin	Pasquotank County	1861–1863
	Daniel Gould Fowle	Wake County	1863
	Richard Caswell Gatlin	Lenoir County	1864–1865
	John Alexander Gilmer	Guilford County	1866–1868
	Abial W. Fisher	Bladen County	1868–1871
	John C. Gorman	Wake County	1871–1877
	Johnstone Jones	Burke County	1877–1888
	James Dodge Glenn	Guilford County	1889
	Francis Hawkins Cameron	Wake County	1893–1896
	Andrew Duvall Cowles	Iredell County	1897–1898
	Beverly S. Royster	Granville County	1898–1904
	Thomas R. Robertson	Mecklenburg County	1905–1909
	Joseph Franklin Armfield	Iredell County	1909–1910
	Roy Lutterell Leinster	Iredell County	1910–1912
	Gordon Smith	Wake County	1912–1913
	Lawrence W. Young	Buncombe County	1913–1916
	Beverly S. Royster	Granville County	1916–1917
	Lawrence W. Young	Buncombe County	1917–1918
	Beverly S. Royster	Granville County	1918–1920
	John Van Bokkelen Metts	Wake County	1920–1951
	Thomas B. Longest	Wake County	1951
	John H. Manning	Durham County	1951–1957
	Capus Miller Waynick	Guilford County	1957–1961
	Claude T. Bowers	Halifax County	1961–1970
	Ferd Leary Davis	Lenoir County	1970–1973
	William M. Buck	Robeson County	1973–1975
	Clarence Bender Shimer	Dare County	1975–1977
	William Emmett Ingram Sr.	Pasquotank County	1977–1983
	Hubert M. Leonard	Montgomery County	1983–1985
	Charles E. Scott	Wake County	1985–1989
	Nathaniel H Robb Jr.	Wake County	1989–1993
	Gerald A. Rudisill Jr.	Stanly County	1993–2001
	William E. Ingram Jr.	Pasquotank County	2001–2010
	Gregory A. Lusk	Sampson County	2010–2019
	Marvin Todd Hunt	Wake County	2019–present
