= Shoffner Act =

Statute in the United States

The Shoffner Act was a statute intended to restore order in North Carolina counties where Ku Klux Klan (KKK) violence raged.

== Description ==
Introduced by Alamance County Republican senator T. M. Shoffner, the Shoffner Act, which was passed by the North Carolina General Assembly in 1870, empowered the governor to suspend habeas corpus and use the state militia. The act was a statute intended to restore order in North Carolina counties where Ku Klux Klan (KKK) violence raged.

Local indignation over the Klan's excesses caused Governor William W. Holden to declare Alamance and Caswell counties to be in a state of insurrection and invoked the Shoffner Act, and brought in Colonel George Kirk to restore order; the acts of Colonel Kirk's troops to end Klan terrorism came to be known as the Kirk-Holden War.

Senator Shoffner was burned in effigy in several counties, and the KKK unsuccessfully tried several times to kill him. To escape revenge by Klansmen against him, he and his family fled to Hendricks County, Indiana.
