= 1868 North Carolina gubernatorial election =

- April 21, 1868
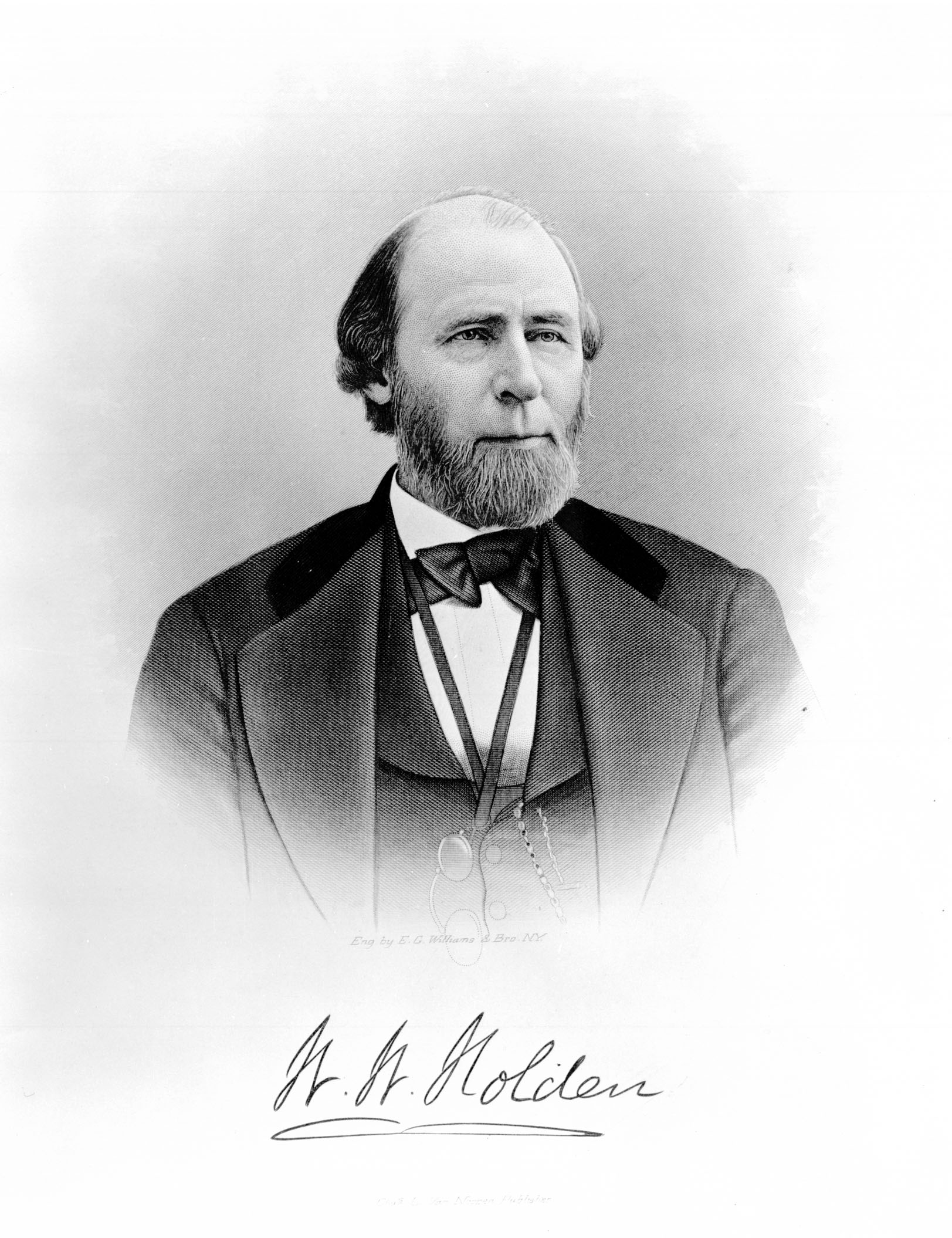

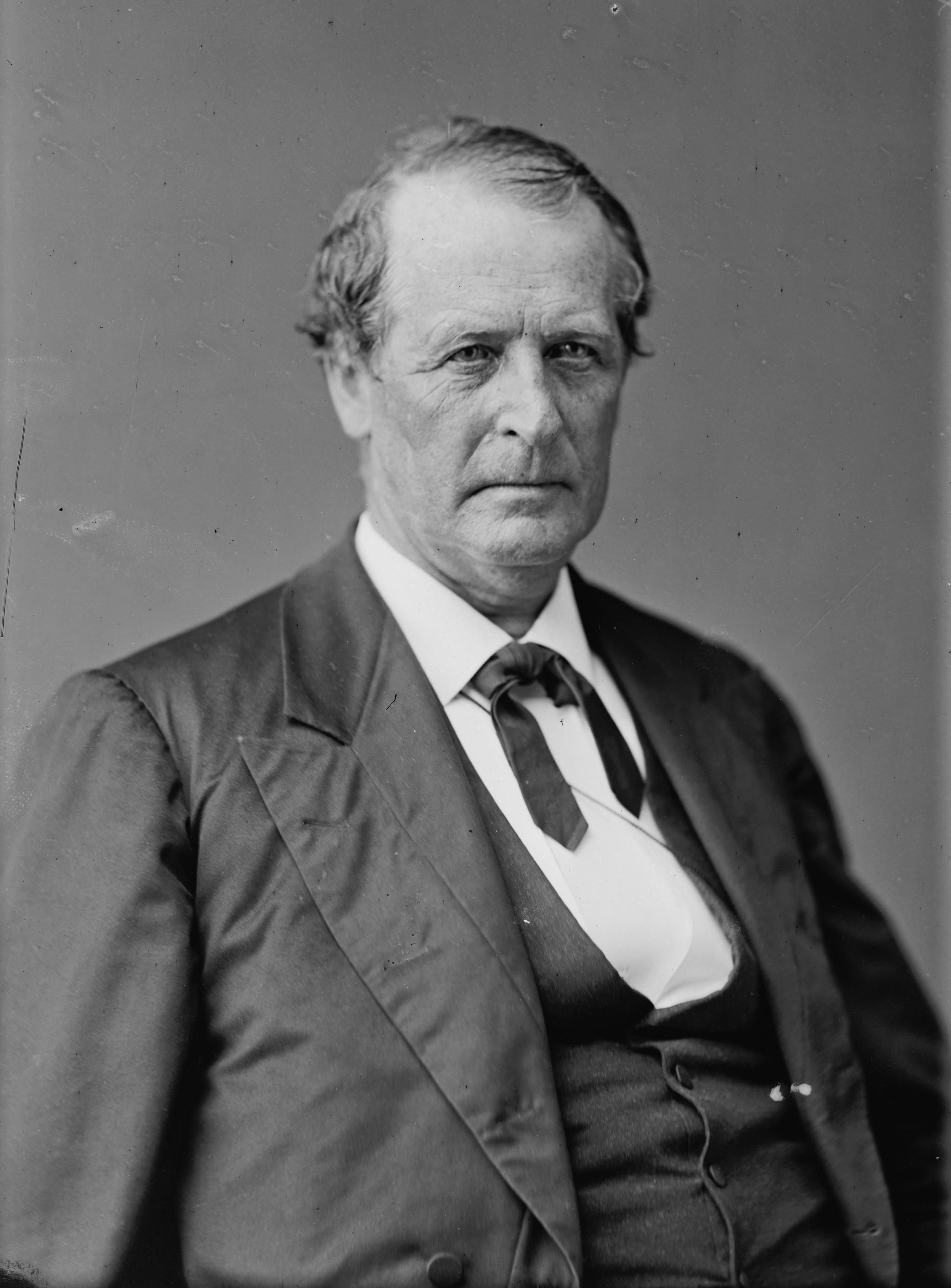
Nominee	William Woods Holden	Thomas Samuel Ashe
Party	Republican	Conservative Party (North Carolina)
Popular vote	92,235	73,600
Percentage	55.49%	44.28%
- County results Holden: 50–60% 60–70% 70–80% 80–90% Ashe: 50–60% 60–70% 70–80%
Governor before election
Jonathan Worth
Conservative
Elected Governor
William Woods Holden
Republican

The 1868 North Carolina gubernatorial election was held on April 21, 1868. Republican nominee William Woods Holden defeated Conservative nominee Thomas Samuel Ashe with 55.49% of the vote.

== General election ==
=== Candidates ===
Major party candidates

- William Woods Holden, Republican
- Thomas Samuel Ashe, Conservative (Democratic)
  - Ashe is sometimes erroneously listed as a Democratic nominee, because the Conservative Party acted largely as the equivalent of the Democratic Party in North Carolina at times, and re-named itself the Democratic Party in 1876, but as of 1868, it was the Conservative Party banner under which Ashe ran. Ashe became the nominee only after Zebulon B. Vance and Augustus Merrimon had declined the Conservatives' nomination.

Other candidates

- Daniel R. Goodloe, Independent

=== Results ===
1868 North Carolina gubernatorial election
Party	Candidate	Votes	%	±%
Republican	William Woods Holden	92,235	55.49%	
Conservative	Thomas Samuel Ashe	73,600	44.28%	
Independent	Daniel R. Goodloe	310	0.19%	
Majority		18,635		
Turnout				
Republican gain from Conservative		Swing		
