= William Woods Holden =

American politician (1818–1892)

William Holden
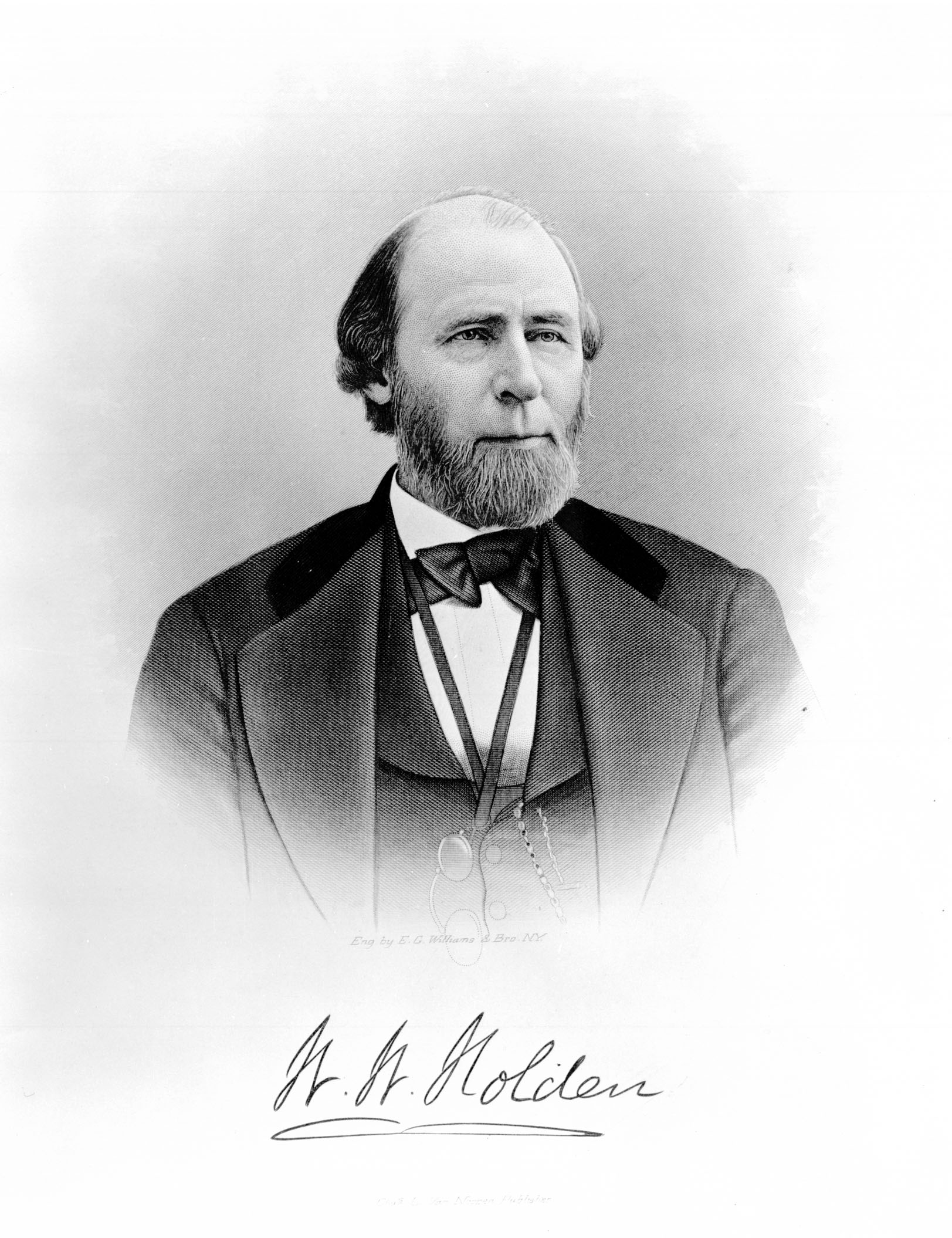

38th and 40th Governor of North Carolina
- In office July 1, 1868 – March 22, 1871
- Lieutenant: Tod Caldwell
- Preceded by: Jonathan Worth
- Succeeded by: Tod Caldwell
- In office May 29, 1865 – December 15, 1865
- Appointed by: Andrew Johnson
- Preceded by: Zebulon Vance
- Succeeded by: Jonathan Worth

Member of the North Carolina House of Representatives
- In office 1846–1848

Personal details
- Born: William Woods Holden; November 24, 1818 Orange County, North Carolina, U.S.
- Died: March 1, 1892 (aged 73) Raleigh, North Carolina, U.S.
- Party: Whig (Before 1843); Democratic (1843–1865); National Union (1865–1866); Republican (1866–1892)
- Spouse(s): Ann Augusta Young; Louisa Virginia Harrison
- Children: Joseph W. Holden

William Woods Holden (November 24, 1818 – March 1, 1892) was an American politician who served as the 38th and 40th governor of North Carolina. He was appointed by President Andrew Johnson in 1865 for a brief term and then elected in 1868. He served until 1871 and was the leader of the state's Republican Party during the Reconstruction Era.

Holden was the second governor in American history to be impeached, and the first to be removed from office through that process. His impeachment was politically motivated due to his suppression of the Ku Klux Klan. After Republicans lost the 1870 election, Democrats impeached Holden on eight charges relating to the Kirk–Holden war. He is the only North Carolina governor to have been impeached.

== Early life ==
William Woods Holden was born on November 24, 1818 in a log cabin near Hillsborough, North Carolina. His parents, Priscilla Woods and Thomas Holden, were not married. Holden married Sally Nichols a year or two later, and together they had 10 children of their own. In 1824, Nichols arranged for William to live with her and Holden, and thereafter was incorporated into the family. His relationship with his half-siblings was often strained in his adult life, but he remained in contact with his parents and his stepmother as an adult. His formal education in his youth was minimal, comprising several months' enrollment in a school.

At age 10, Holden began an apprenticeship under Dennis Heartt, the pro-Whig Party editor of the Hillsborough Recorder, a newspaper. In that capacity he sorted type and delivered copies of the paper, and in later years partook in typesetting. While he spoke little of his apprenticeship in his later life, Holden described Heartt as "the best man in all respects". When he was 16 years of age, he negotiated terms with Heartt to abrogate his apprenticeship and moved to Milton, where he found work with the Milton Spectator edited by Nathaniel J. Palmer. Several months later he moved to Danville, Virginia and set type for a local newspaper edited by Joseph C. Megginson. He also wrote his first article while working for the publication.

Within a year of his move to Danville, Holden returned to Hillsborough and found work as a store clerk. He engaged in private study during this time before moving to Raleigh in October 1836. He quickly found employment as a journeyman typesetter and compositor for the Raleigh Star, a Whig paper edited by Thomas J. Lemay. Aside from a brief attempt to help Lemay inaugurate the Oxford Kaleidoscope and Republican in Oxford in 1837, he worked for the Star until 1841, living in a cabin adjacent to Lemay's home and eating with his family.

With Lemay's encouragement, Holden undertook the reading of law at night under the supervision of a local attorney. He passed the bar examination and was licensed to practice in county courts of North Carolina on January 1, 1841.

He then studied law, was admitted to the bar in 1841, and became a member of the Whig party. However, he never practiced law and instead participated in the newspaper business.

In 1843, he became owner and editor of the North Carolina Standard in Raleigh. He changed the newspaper's party affiliation to the Democratic Party. When Holden took over the newspaper, it was struggling financially. Under his leadership, it became one of the most widely read newspapers in the state. He continued as owner and editor of the newspaper until he was elected governor.

== Political career ==
In December 1843, Holden became a delegate to the Democratic state party convention, where he was elected to the North Carolina Democratic Party state executive committee. In 1846, Holden was elected to represent Wake County in the North Carolina House of Commons and chose to only serve one term. His tenure was uneventful; he voted the Democratic Party line and sponsored one bill which provided for the construction of a building in Raleigh to house deaf mutes in the state. During the 1850 elections he served a major role in ending the Whig dominance in the state. By 1858, he was chairman of the party. That year, he unsuccessfully attempted to gain the Democratic gubernatorial nomination, but was defeated by John W. Ellis, and then his party passed him over for a Senate seat.

In April 1860, Holden served as a delegate to the Democratic National Convention in Charleston. He personally favored the candidacies of Joseph Lane of Oregon and John C. Breckinridge of Kentucky for the presidential nomination. He also attended the following convention in Baltimore in July, where the party fractured and nominated two separate tickets, one led by Breckinridge and another led by Stephen A. Douglas of Illinois. The Standard subsequently endorsed Breckinridge as a representative of Southern interests.

Throughout the 1840s and 1850s, Holden advocated for the expansion of slavery and sometimes supported the right of secession, but by 1860 he had shifted his position to support the Union. Holden and his newspaper fell out of favor with the state Democratic Party, and he was removed as the state's printer when he editorialized against secession in 1860. In 1861, Holden was sent to a state convention to vote against secession representing Wake County.

Holden was dissatisfied with Confederate policies and the early conduct of the war—particularly federal incursions into North Carolina's weakly-defended coast, and worked to consolidate a new political organization opposed to the incumbent state administration, led by Governor Henry Toole Clark. By 1862, with the help of erstwhile Unionists, Holden had created the Conservative Party. The new grouping was predominated by former Whigs, including William Alexander Graham, George E. Badger, and Jonathan Worth. Holden and Graham served as the party's leading figures. Under this new emerging political system, the faction of the Democratic Party associated with the incumbent administration and occupied by the more ardent secessionists became known as the "Confederate Party".

The Confederate Party decided against nominating Governor Clark in the state's 1862 gubernatorial election, owing to his unpopularity and perceived lack of political skill, and instead endorsed William Johnston, a secessionist former Whig. The Conservative Party initially sought to back Graham but, after he declined to run, decided to support a candidacy by Colonel Zebulon Vance. Vance participated little in the actual campaign, with most of the effort being conducted by Holden and fellow newspaper editor Edward J. Hale. Through the Standard, Holden attacked Johnston and the incumbent forces as corrupt and inept and criticized the Conscription Act as inequitable. Vance easily won the election.

Following the electoral success, Holden created a plan adopted by the General Assembly to replace all non-Conservative state officials. He and Vance initially enjoyed a close relationship, with Vance consulting him on major political issues, while Holden's newspaper, the Standard, supported the governor's administration. Owing to Vance's influence, Holden was appointed state printer in November 1862. By 1863, their relationship had soured over differing opinions on pursuing peace. Holden believed North Carolina should advocate for an end to the war both as a means of curtailing a destructive conflict and securing favorable terms with the federal government as well as securing more favorable treatment from the Confederate government. This included threatening secession from the Confederacy. Vance only believed in pursuing peace with the cooperation of other secessionist states, and Holden's attempts as the Conservative Party leader to influence him proved futile.

In 1864, he ran against incumbent Governor Vance as a peace candidate, but Vance defeated him in a landslide receiving over eighty percent of the vote.

When the Civil War ended on May 9, 1865, Holden was appointed Governor on May 29, by President Andrew Johnson. During Reconstruction he served a major role in North Carolina and placed the Standard newspaper in the hands of his son, Joseph W. Holden. However, he was defeated by Jonathan Worth in a special election for governor in 1865.

Johnson then nominated Holden to be minister to El Salvador, but the Senate rejected his nomination, so he returned to editing the Standard, and became president of the North Carolina Union League, and organized the North Carolina Republican Party in 1866–67.

=== Governor ===
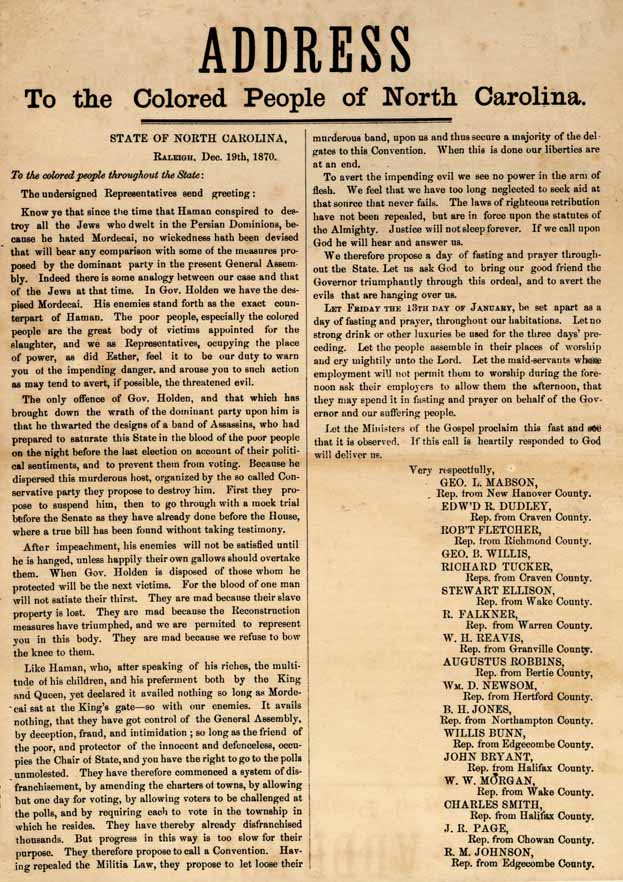
Address to the Colored People of North Carolina. Broadside published December 1870 signed by 17 state legislators warning of consequences of removal from office of Governor Holden

While voters were approving the new state constitution, Holden was elected governor at the head of the Republican ticket in 1868, defeating Thomas Samuel Ashe. When he was elected governor, Holden gave up editorship and ownership of the Standard, selling it for $15,000. He also quit the Union League, believing that a public official should not be a member of a secret society. During his tenure he chose to remain in his private home in Raleigh instead of the official Governor's Palace, which had been vandalized by federal troops.

On June 20, the U.S. Congress voted to remove Holden's political disabilities. General Edward Canby, then charged with the military administration in North Carolina as commander of the Second Military District, issued an order which called for Governor Worth to be replaced by Holden on July 1. Worth reluctantly resigned and Holden was sworn in. On that day, at Holden's call, the General Assembly convened. After Holden informed Canby that the legislature had ratified the new state constitution, Canby informed him that his subordinates would relinquish their administrative authority under the Reconstruction Acts and only act to preserve order on behalf of the civil government. Holden was formally inaugurated as governor on July 4. Canby officially restored all powers of governance to the civil authorities under his jurisdiction on July 24.

At the onset of his term, Holden was chiefly concerned with filling vacant offices and re-organizing the state militia. Article 14, Section 5 of the new state constitution empowered the governor "in the absence of any contrary provision" to appoint all public officials across the state "until their successors shall have been chosen and duly qualified according to the provisions of this Constitution." Holden argued in a letter to General Canby that the framers intended this to enable him to replace officials of the outgoing Worth administration until the General Assembly could organize elections. On July 24, owing to some opposition from incumbents, the General Assembly declared that all public offices were vacant, allowing Holden to proceed. He appointed Republicans to the vacancies, and they served until January 1869, when new elections provided for their successors. He hoped that by seeding a corps of officeholders throughout the state's counties, he could lay a foundation of loyal Republicans to bolster the state party. With regards to the militia issue, Holden wrote to the General Assembly on July 17, asking them for new legislation. The law, which passed on August 13, enabled the governor to organize infantry regiments, cavalry battalions, and artillery batteries, according to three divisions across the state and enabled him to call it into service to preserve order at the request of any five county magistrates. He completed his organization of the new militia by September and secured arms and equipment for them by November.

To combat the Ku Klux Klan, Holden hired two dozen detectives from 1869 to 1870, and although the detective unit was not overly successful in limiting Klan activities, his efforts to suppress the Klan exceeded those of other Southern governors. With new powers granted to him by the state legislature under the 1870 Shoffner Act, he called out the militia against the Klan in 1870, imposed martial law in two counties, and suspended the writ of habeas corpus for accused leaders of the Klan in what became known as the Kirk–Holden war. The result was a political backlash, accompanied by violence at the time of the election to suppress the black vote. The Republicans lost the legislative election.

After the Democratic Party regained majorities in both houses of the state legislature in 1870, Governor Holden was impeached by the North Carolina House of Representatives on December 14, 1870. During his trial in the Senate he was defended by Nathaniel Boyden and William N. H. Smith, but he was convicted on six of the eight charges against him by Democratic members of the North Carolina Senate in party-line votes on March 22, 1871. Holden's son-in-law, state senator Lewis P. Olds, was among those who voted against removal. The other two charges received majority votes, but not the required two-thirds majorities.

The main charges against Holden were related to the rough treatment and arrests of North Carolina citizens by state militia officer Colonel George W. Kirk during the enforcement of Reconstruction civil rights legislation. Holden had formed the state militia to respond to the assassination of Republican senator John W. Stephens on May 21, 1870, and the lynching of Wyatt Outlaw, a black police officer in the town of Graham in Alamance County, as well as numerous attacks by the Ku Klux Klan.

Holden was the first governor in American history to be impeached, convicted, and removed from office. Governor Charles L. Robinson of Kansas was the first American governor to be impeached, however, without conviction and removal.

== Later life ==
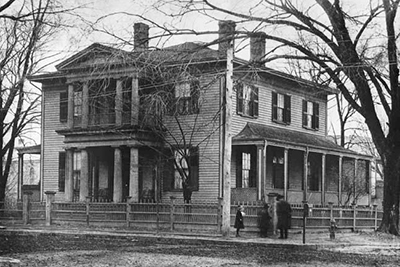
Holden's home in Raleigh

Following his impeachment and removal from office he moved to Washington, D.C., where he resumed working on the Daily Chronicle. In 1873, President Ulysses Grant appointed him as postmaster for Raleigh and he served until 1881. President James A. Garfield was later asked by Raleigh Republicans to not re-appoint him and Holden left the Republican party after losing his position.

According to Dr. Eugene Grisson, Holden experienced a stroke in 1887 which caused him to suffer paralysis, and in January 1889, he suffered a cerebral hemorrhage, which left him mentally incapacitated. From November 1889 to March 1890, Holden reportedly dictated his memoirs to his daughter Mary. The memoirs were posthumously edited by William K. Boyd and published in 1911. They cover the elections of 1850 through his impeachment and serve largely as a defense of his career. (Note: Owing to the timing of the production of the memoirs and Holden's health problems, scholars Horace W. Raper and Thornton W. Mitchell, expressed doubt as to the true extent of his authorship of them.)

Holden died on March 1, 1892, and was buried at Historic Oakwood Cemetery in Raleigh. He was recognized as "one of the foremost men in intellectual power and daring that were ever born here" by North Carolinian Walter Hines Page. In 2011, a posthumous pardon of Holden was approved by the North Carolina Senate by a 48–0 vote, however, the measure died as the North Carolina House of Representatives did not take it up during the session.

== Legacy ==
Throughout and after his public career, Holden was received as a deeply controversial figure. Editor Josephus Daniels opined in 1883 that the former governor "made stronger friends and bitterer enemies than any other man in our history, and he is hated today with such a hatred as none but a strong man ever inspired." Initial assessments of Holden by historians were also broadly negative with the exception of a paper authored by William K. Boyd. J. G. de Roulhac Hamilton, in his 1914 work Reconstruction in North Carolina, characterized Holden as motivated by personal ambition, surrounded by sycophants and swindlers, and had enacted a "reign of terror" in prosecuting the Kirk-Holden war. Hamilton's view was influential on succeeding generations of historians. Early studies also placed emphasis on Holden's actions leading to and his subsequent impeachment rather than his involvement in journalism and other initial pursuits. Scholarly appraisal of Holden began to change with the completion of Horace W. Raper's doctoral dissertation about him in 1951. Revisionist historical developments in the 1960s and 1970s advanced by Otto H. Olsen and Allen W. Trelease offered the view that Holden was targeted by the Ku Klux Klan and Conservatives who sought top undermine Reconstruction's biracial democracy. The newer scholarship argued that Holden genuinely sought to improve the wellbeing of common people but failed owing to his overambitious nature and flaws stemming from his humble origins. Raper published a largely sympathetic biography of Holden in 1985. William C. Harris published a biography in 1987 which argued that Holden was sincere and deeply politically influential throughout the state and the country during his career but downplayed his relevance to the affairs of common people, writing that he was "a product of the diverse interplay of political rivalries and events" and the "common political culture of all classes" in North Carolina. Despite the positive shift in scholarship, popular perception of Holden often remained negative.

== Bibliography ==
- Alexander, Roberta Sue (December 1988). "William Woods Holden: Firebrand of North Carolina Politics (review)". Civil War History. 34 (4): 349–350. doi:10.1353/cwh.1988.0045.
- Escott, Paul D. (1985). Many Excellent People : Power and Privilege in North Carolina, 1850-1900. Chapel Hill: University of North Carolina Press. ISBN 978-0-8078-1651-6.
- Folk, Edgar Estes (January 1942). "W. W. Holden and the North Carolina Standard, 1843-1848: A Study in Political Journalism". The North Carolina Historical Review. 19 (1): 22–47. JSTOR 23515668.
- Folk, Edgar E. (1934). W.W. Holden, Political Journalist, Editor of N.C. Standard, 1843–1865. Ph. D. dissertation. Department of English, George Peabody College for Teachers. Nashville.
- Folk, Edgar E.; Shaw, Bynum (1982). W. W. Holden: A Political Biography. Winston-Salem, North Carolina: John F. Blair. ISBN 0-89587-025-8.
- Harris, William C. (October 1982). "William Woods Holden: In Search of Vindication". The North Carolina Historical Review. 59 (4): 354–372. JSTOR 23521800.
- Massengill, Stephen E. (1985). "The Detectives of William W. Holden, 1869–1870". North Carolina Historical Review. 62 (4): 448–487. ISSN 0029-2494.
- Raper, Horace W. (1985). William W. Holden: North Carolina's Political Enigma. Chapel Hill: University of North Carolina Press. ISBN 0807850608.
- Raper, Horace W.; Mitchell, Thornton W., eds. (2000). The Papers of William Woods Holden (1841–1868). Vol. 1. Raleigh: Division of Archives and History, North Carolina Department of Cultural Resources. ISBN 0-86526-292-6.
- Reid, Richard (1985). "William W. Holden and 'Disloyalty' in the Civil War". Canadian Journal of History. 20 (1): 23–44. doi:10.3138/cjh.20.1.23., Fulltext online in Ebsco
- Harris, William C. (1987). William Woods Holden, Firebrand of North Carolina Politics. Louisiana State U. Press. pp. 1–332. ISBN 9780807113257.
- Wade, Wyn Craig (1987). The Fiery Cross: The Ku Klux Klan in America. New York: Simon and Schuster. ISBN 9780195123579.
- Nelson, Scott Reynolds (2004). "Red Strings and Half-Brothers: Civil Wars in Alamance County, North Carolina". In Inscoe, John C.; Kenzer, Robert C. (eds.). Enemies of the Country: New Perspectives on Unionists in the Civil War South (reprint ed.). Athens: University of Georgia Press. pp. 37–53. ISBN 9780820326603.
- Bradley, Mark L. (2011). Bluecoats and Tar Heels: Soldiers and Civilians in Reconstruction North Carolina (paperback ed.). Lexington: The University of Kentucky Press. ISBN 978-0-8131-3385-0.
- Doran, Will (November 24, 2018). "As hate crimes rise, some look to an impeached NC governor for lessons". News & Observer.

Party political offices
First	Republican nominee for Governor of North Carolina; 1865	Succeeded by Alfred Dockery
Preceded by Alfred Dockery	Republican nominee for Governor of North Carolina; 1868	Succeeded by Tod Caldwell
Political offices
Preceded by Zebulon Vance	Governor of North Carolina; 1865	Succeeded by Jonathan Worth
Preceded by Jonathan Worth	Governor of North Carolina; 1868–1871	Succeeded by Tod Caldwell
