= Abraham Galloway =

American politician (1837–1870)

Abraham H. Galloway
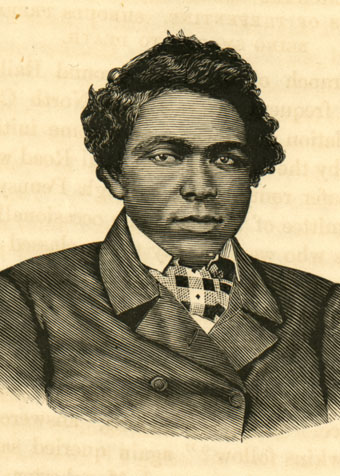
- An etching of an 1857 photograph of Galloway

Member of the North Carolina Senate from the 13th district
- In office November 16, 1868 – April 12, 1869
- Preceded by: Mathias E. Manly
- Succeeded by: George W. Price

Personal details
- Born: February 8, 1837 Southport, North Carolina, United States
- Died: September 1, 1870 (aged 33) Wilmington, North Carolina, U.S.
- Party: Republican
- Spouse: Martha Ann Dixon
- Profession: Abolitionist, Union Army spy, politician, brick mason

Abraham Harris Galloway (February 8, 1837 – September 1, 1870) was an American abolitionist and politician. A former slave, he served as a Union Army spy and early black political organizer in eastern North Carolina during the American Civil War. After the war, he helped to organize the Republican Party in the state and served in the North Carolina Senate from 1868 to 1870.

Galloway was born in Smithville to an enslaved black woman and a white ship's pilot. He moved with his master to Wilmington and worked as a brick mason before fleeing the city with another slave to seek freedom in 1857, eventually reaching Canada. In subsequent years, Galloway travelled frequently both within Canada and back into the United States, namely the states of Ohio and Massachusetts, where he made contacts with abolitionists and sometimes delivered speeches denouncing slavery. Following the outbreak of the Civil War, he was recruited to serve as a spy for federal forces. He traveled widely throughout the secessionist Confederacy during the war, though the full extent and nature of his activities are not known. In 1862, he disappeared in Mississippi under unknown circumstances, eventually resurfacing in Union-occupied New Bern, North Carolina by the following year. He emerged as a leading figure in the local black community and convinced freed slaves to support the Union war effort and enlist in the federal army.

As the war drew to an end, Galloway became increasingly focused on black citizenship and voting rights for freedmen, leading efforts to establish National Equal Rights League chapters in eastern North Carolina. Returning to Wilmington, he spearheaded local efforts to establish and promote the Republican Party, viewing it as the political organization best suited to represent the interests of blacks and poor whites. He served as a delegate in the state's 1868 constitutional convention and was subsequently elected to the North Carolina Senate, developing a reputation as a fierce debater. As a legislator, he voted for ratification of the 14th and 15th amendments to the U.S. Constitution, assisted in efforts to create a public school system, denounced railroads and the Ku Klux Klan, and supported women's rights. He died shortly after his reelection in 1870.

== Early life ==
Abraham Harris Galloway was born on February 8, 1837, in the small town of Smithville, North Carolina, United States. He was born to an enslaved black woman, Hester Hankins, who was owned by the widow of a Methodist minister. His father was John Wesley Galloway, a white ship's pilot. How the two met is unclear. The Galloways were a locally prominent family and included several wealthy planters. Abraham was owned by the widow's son, Marsden Milton Hankins. Historian David Cecelski suggests a "family bond may have brought" the parents into contact, as John was Marsden's second cousin. Abraham later recounted that his father "recognized me as his son and protected me as far as he was allowed to do so." John Galloway married a white woman in 1839 and had eight children with her. The extent of Abraham's contact with these relations is not clear, though his eventual widow later recalled that Abraham had familiarity with the eldest of Galloway's white wedlock-born sons, Alexander Swift Galloway, and indicated that the two were playmates in childhood. Abraham had no formal education in his youth and could not ably read or write. (Note: Biographer David Cecelski writes that Galloway "could not read or write well, if at all," while author David Zucchino describes him as "functionally illiterate" having "never learned to competently read or write".)

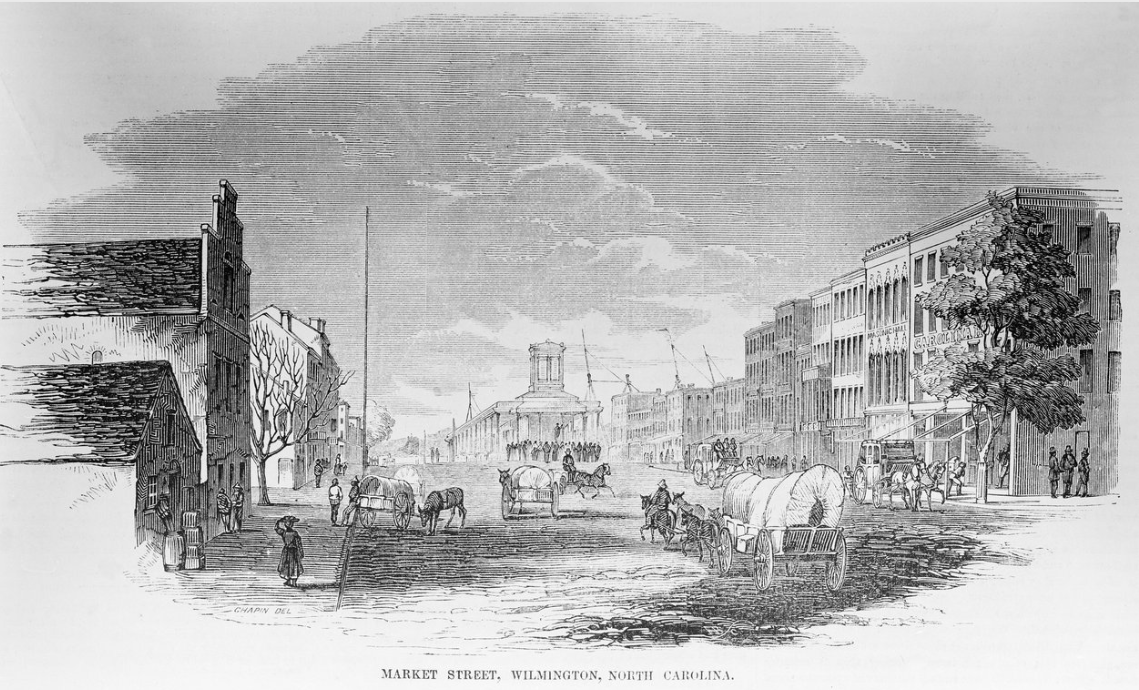
Wilmington, North Carolina, in 1855. Galloway worked as an enslaved brick mason in the city before fleeing in 1857.

Hankins eventually moved to Wilmington to work as a mechanic and engineer. Galloway apprenticed as a brick mason until he became a master of the trade. Once achieving this status, he moved in with Hankins and his wife in their home off of North Fourth Street. He later recalled Hankins as a "man of very good disposition" who "always said he would sell before he would use the whip" but described his wife as a "very mean woman". Hankins permitted Galloway to find brick masonry work at his preference as long as he could pay Hankins $180 a year from his earnings.

Galloway decided to escape when it became impossible for him to continue bringing his owner the money in light of tightening economic conditions in Wilmington. In 1857, at the age of 20, Galloway was able to escape from slavery alongside a fellow slave, Richard Eden. A sympathetic ship captain agreed to hide Galloway and Eden below the deck of his schooner, among barrels of turpentine, tar, and rosin. Northbound ships were fumigated by burning turpentine to flush out insects and runaway slaves. Galloway and Eden planned to don oilcloth and wet towels to ward off smoke, but the fires were never lit. Galloway and Eden arrived successfully in Philadelphia, Pennsylvania, sickened by exposure to the ship's cargo. The two sought assistance at the offices of the Vigilance Committee of Philadelphia, the city's oldest abolitionist organization, and met one of the group's leaders, Underground Railroad operative William Still. Though Pennsylvania was a free state, Galloway and Eden faced the risk of capture by bounty hunters under the terms of the Fugitive Slave Act of 1850. To ensure their safety, Still supplied Galloway, Eden, and a third fugitive slave, John Henry Pettifoot, train tickets and a list of contacts to assist them on a journey to Kingston, Ontario, Canada. At a Vigilance Committee member's request, Galloway left in their care two souvenirs: a photograph of himself and one of the oilcloths he and Eden had used on their voyage. An etching of the photograph was later created, and it remains the only confirmed image of Galloway.

Galloway, Eden, and Pettifoot left Philadelphia in late June 1857. In Kingston they met George Mink, a black stagecoach operator and ally of the Vigilance Committee of Philadelphia. On July 20, Eden wrote Still a letter confirming the party's safe arrival in Kingston and connecting with Mink. He also mentioned that Galloway had found work as a brick mason. In subsequent years, Galloway travelled frequently both within Canada and back into the United States, namely the states of Ohio and Massachusetts, where he made contacts with abolitionists and sometimes delivered speeches denouncing slavery. In December 1860 he went to Boston to prepare to sail to the Republic of Haiti to support abolitionist James Redpath's black settler colony. He arrived in Haiti in January 1861. He stayed for 15 weeks, visiting a black American exile community in Saint-Marc, and returning to the United States on April 1.

== American Civil War ==
Shortly after Galloway returned to the United States, the American Civil War broke out. At the recommendation of abolitionist George Luther Stearns, federal military leaders in Massachusetts recruited Galloway to serve as a spy in the territory of the breakaway Confederate States of America. Within several weeks he was reporting to Major General Benjamin Butler, who commanded the federal garrison at Fort Monroe, Virginia. Galloway traveled widely throughout the Confederacy during the war, though the full extent and nature of his activities is not fully known. He rarely spoke of his service as a spy later in his life. He investigated potential landing sites for federal forces in advance of Burnside's North Carolina Expedition in 1861 and 1862.

In 1862, Butler was reassigned to command the newly formed Department of the Gulf. Galloway was transferred along with the commander to federally-held land in Louisiana. Shortly thereafter he was attached to federal forces operating near Vicksburg, Mississippi. He later disappeared in Mississippi under unknown circumstances. The Anglo-African wrote that he had been seized by Confederate forces "on distant Southern strand" but did not elaborate further. He later resurfaced in Union-occupied New Bern, North Carolina. Mary Ann Starkey, a former slave and local leader in the black community, later said of his arrival in the city that he was in dire need of her help. The two later became close allies, with Galloway supporting her efforts to assist freedmen and women and sometimes joining meetings among black activists at her home. (Note: The two later had a falling out in 1865 over Galloway's supposed mishandling of Starkey's money.)

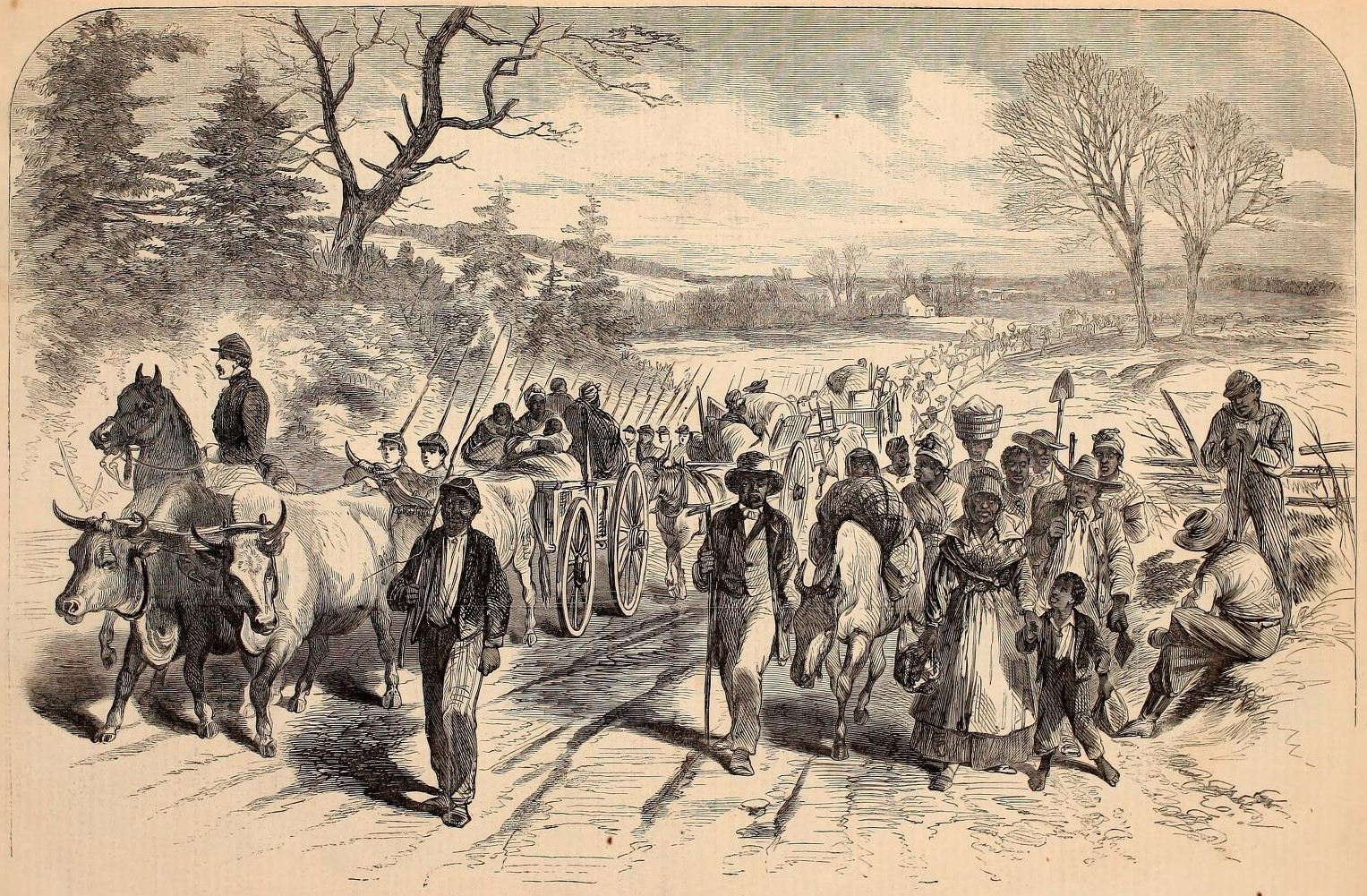
Fugitive slaves entering New Bern, January 1863

Galloway made frequent appearances in New Bern. He developed a reputation as prideful and brazen. Ignoring racial customs, he refused to move aside to let white men pass him on the street or to allow white customers to make purchases ahead of him in shops. In May 1863, Edward Kinsley, an abolitionist and an emissary of Massachusetts Governor John Albion Andrew, traveled to New Bern to investigate the possibility of recruiting blacks to serve in the Union Army. Kinsley managed to secure a meeting with local black leaders one night in Starkey's home, among whom was Galloway. Galloway initially opposed black enlistment. The black leaders demanded, among other things, that blacks would be recruited on the condition that they would be serving in a struggle to end slavery, not only preserve the territorial integrity of the United States. The negotiations proved contentious and lasted into the morning, but Kinsley eventually ceded to their demands. Galloway departed, and several days later he and some of the other black leaders led a procession of thousands of slaves into New Bern. Those that enlisted with the federal army were organized as the 1st North Carolina Colored Volunteers.

With a system of black recruitment set up under Brigadier General Edward A. Wild, Galloway served as an emissary between the general's recruiters and fugitive slave bands, easing contraband enlistment into the army. Over the summer of 1863, he frequently addressed black gatherings, arguing that armed black participation in the federal war effort would help secure full citizenship for freedpeople after the war. Although not fully literate, Galloway proved an able orator. In his speeches to black audiences, he employed sarcasm and irony when ridiculing whites. He also helped Starkey's efforts to provide aid to black soldiers and their families, soliciting donations on her behalf when he travelled to New York and Boston, and on one occasion bringing her funds for disbursement to wounded and ill black soldiers in Portsmouth, Virginia. Later in 1863, Butler was brought back from the Gulf and assumed command of the Department of Virginia and North Carolina, Galloway joined with other black leaders in asking that he urge the Department of War to ensure better treatment of black soldiers. Galloway also succeeded in helping his mother escape Confederate-held Wilmington and bringing her to New Bern. With General Wild's assistance, he was able to send her to Boston and arrange for her to stay with an abolitionist businessman.

Meanwhile, Butler had received reports of some of the captured Confederates held at the federal prisoner of war camp at Point Lookout, Maryland, of holding Unionist sympathies. In what proved to be his last official act as a Union spy, Galloway agreed to go on behalf of the general to the prison to ascertain the inmates' sympathies. (Note: Galloway's reasons for ending his tenure as a spy are unclear. Cecelski suggests that he may have resigned to pursue political ambitions, grown disillusioned with federal military treatment of blacks, or found it less desirable to work with new white federal officers.) At Butler's recommendation, some of the soldiers were given the opportunity to switch allegiances and enlist in federal military service. In December 1863, he met with Robert Hamilton, publisher of The Anglo-African, in Norfolk, Virginia and agreed to guide him on a tour of Union-occupied ports in the South. The two quickly became friends, and together saw Norfolk and visited Portsmouth, Hamilton, and Fortress Monroe. From there, the two sailed to New Bern, took a train to Morehead City, and sailed again to Beaufort. In Beaufort, Galloway took Hamilton to the home of two freedpeople, Napoleon and Massie Dixon, and their daughter with whom he was romantically involved, Martha Ann Dixon. Galloway married Dixon on December 29 at her parents' home. Dixon advocated for abolition and later worked as a seamstress. In the time intervening their arrival in Beaufort and his marriage, Galloway also facilitated meetings between Hamilton and black leaders in New Bern. Hamilton's resulting dispatches to The Anglo-African carried a positive impression of Galloway.

== Early political organizing activities ==
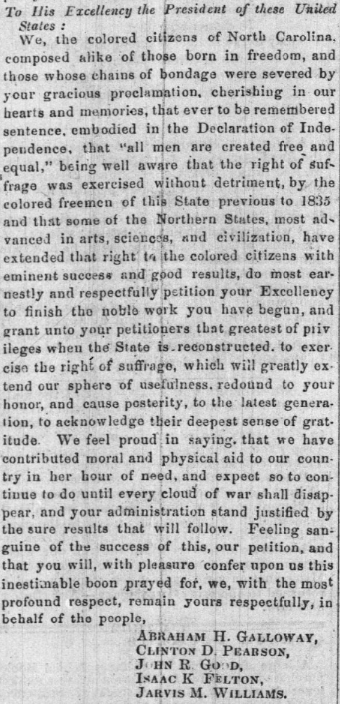
Petition of Galloway and other black leaders delivered to President Lincoln at their meeting in the White House as reproduced in the North Carolina Times

On April 29, 1864, Galloway was part of a delegation of six black leaders—the others being Edward H. Hill, Clinton D. Pierson, John R. Good, and Isaac K. Felton of New Bern and Jarvis M. Williams of Washington, North Carolina—who met with U.S. President Abraham Lincoln at the White House in Washington, D.C. According to Cecelski, while Lincoln had met with black leaders from the North earlier in the war, "This seems to have been his first meeting with African American leaders from the South." The delegation entered the White House through the front door—a courtesy the men were unfamiliar with—and had a polite and frank discussion with the president about the political future of black freedmen. They then presented a petition on behalf of black North Carolinians, asking that black men be guaranteed full suffrage rights at the conclusion of the war. Afterwards, the men walked to the U.S. Capitol and distributed copies of their petition to U.S. Congressmen.

Following the visit to Washington, Galloway, Pierson, Hill, and Good went on a tour of Northern states to promote support for black suffrage. On May 4, they addressed the congregation of Zion Church in New York City. Galloway appealed for the congregants to provide aid for Southern blacks. Afterwards, Galloway briefly left New York, visiting Boston, before coming back to the city by May 11, where he spoke at Sullivan Street AME Zion Church and visited the offices of The Anglo-African. Galloway and the other delegates to Washington returned to New Bern in early June and held a meeting at Andrew Chapel to report on their meeting with the president. In his remarks he emphasized the importance of self-reliance among the former slaves and denounced the accusation that enfranchised blacks would be easily corrupted, saying he had witnessed vote buying practices among Northern whites. The Anglo-African reported that while Galloway was willing "to wait a little longer" for social equality with whites, "he wanted his political rights now."

Meanwhile, preparations were made in Syracuse, New York to host a "National Convention of Colored Men" in October. Mass meetings were held in New Bern's black community to assemble a delegation. Pierson, Good, and John Randolph Jr., all associates of Galloway, were chosen to represent the city, though the mass meetings exposed a rift between local black leaders and James Walker Hood, an AME Zion missionary who had been dispatched from the North to aid the city. Over the course of the summer the city was battered by a regional yellow fever epidemic—which eventually killed Galloway's father off the coast of Bermuda—and heavy federal conscription of black labor caused unrest and community divisions. Feeling it prudent to provide the black community with a sense of reconciliation, Pierson, Good, and Randolph resigned their mandate and joined with others in a mass meeting in electing Galloway to serve as the city's delegate.

The National Convention of Colored Men opened in Syracuse on October 4. Galloway was one of 144 delegates, one of only 16 from the South, and one of only two from North Carolina. During its first meeting, the convention named Frederick Douglass its presiding officer. Each state was entitled to have a delegate serve as a vice president of the convention and have a seat on the Committee for Permanent Organization; both spots were granted to Galloway. Furthermore, Douglass appointed Galloway to the convention's four-man executive board and to its Business Committee. Galloway spoke little on the convention floor, though he did become a firm supporter of the body's unanimously-passed resolution, a "Declaration of Wrongs and Rights", which detailed the abuses blacks had suffered under slavery and demanded political equality in the United States. On the third and fourth days of the convention, the body organized the National Equal Rights League and elected its officers. Galloway favored Henry Highland Garnet for the league presidency, though John Mercer Langston ultimately secured the post. Despite this, Galloway was elected to serve as one of the nascent organization's 16 vice presidents and one of the four members of its executive board. (Note: There is no evidence that Galloway participated in national league activities after the convention in Syracuse.)

With the convention adjourned on October 7, Galloway embarked on a speaking tour across the North states to promote the National Equal Rights League and abolition. He addressed meetings and congregations in Baltimore, Newark, Boston, and New York City before returning to New Bern. A state chapter and several local auxiliaries of the league were organized. The New Bern division elected Galloway its president, while a chapter in Morehead City named itself the "Abraham H. Galloway Equal Rights League". Galloway served as the "president" of ceremonies for a celebration of the second anniversary of the Emancipation Proclamation on January 2, 1865, in New Bern organized by several regional Equal Rights Leagues.

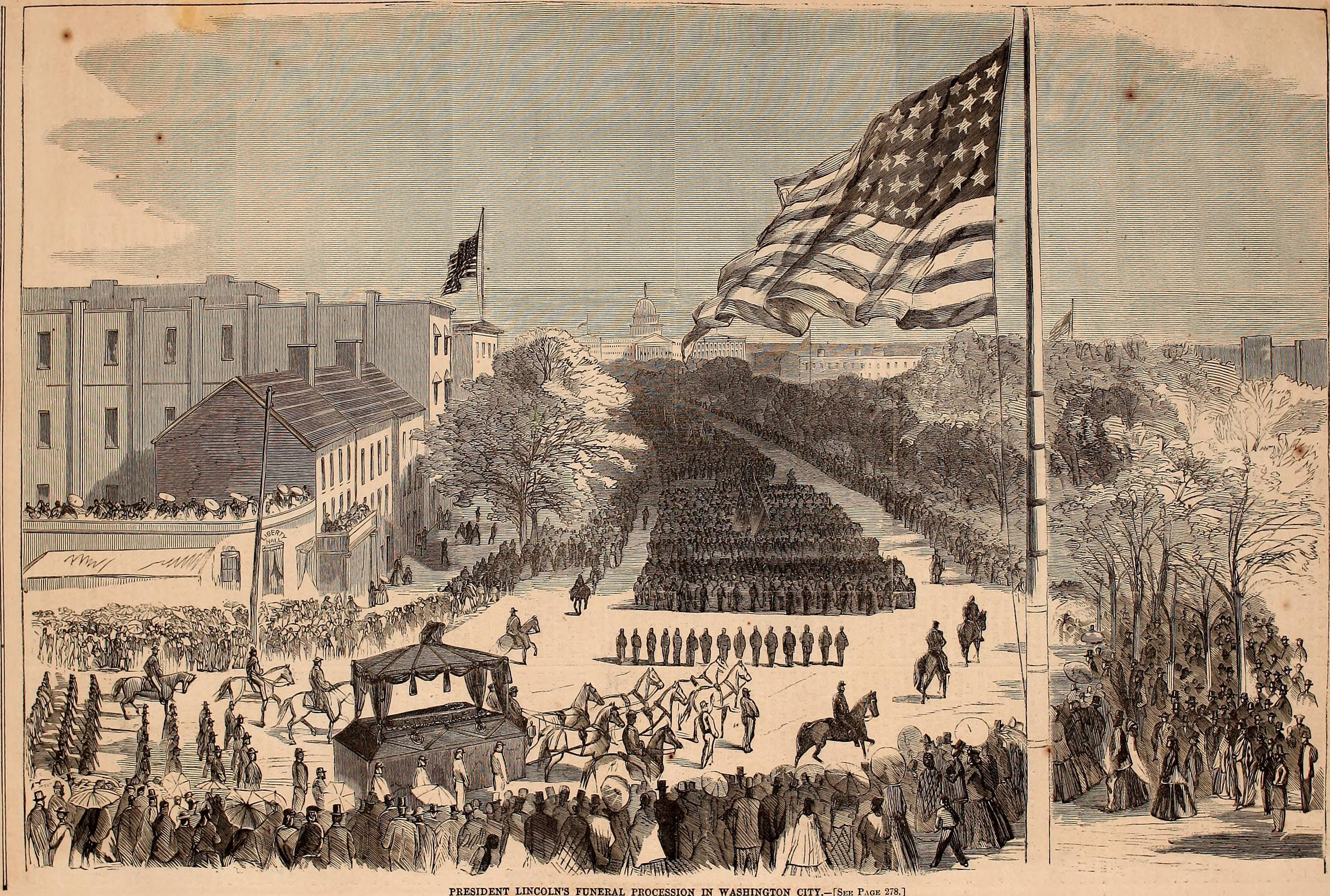
Galloway attended Lincoln's funeral procession (depicted) on April 19, 1865 in Washington D.C.

Shortly thereafter, Fort Fisher, which defended the mouth of the Cape Fear River, fell to Union forces. At the end of the month the U.S. Congress passed the Thirteenth Amendment to the United States Constitution, which declared slavery abolished, and forwarded it to state legislatures for ratification. Galloway presided over a celebration by blacks in New Bern of abolition and the coming end of the war on February 16. Over the course of March, large portions of North Carolina were captured by federal forces advancing from South Carolina. In early April, the Confederate capital of Richmond, Virginia, fell to Union forces. As federal forces continued to secure control over the South, President Lincoln was assassinated on April 14. Galloway observed the public procession of Lincoln's coffin to the U.S. Capitol building in Washington, D.C., five days later. He subsequently served on the executive board of the National Lincoln Monument Association.

With the conclusion of the American Civil War, Galloway and his colleagues continued to promote the Equal Rights League and demands for African American suffrage. Freedmen began organizing in Wilmington, though the nexus of black political activity in North Carolina remained in New Bern and Beaufort. Galloway emerged as the leading figure in New Bern's nascent freedmen's politics. At an 1865 Fourth of July celebration organized by the Salmon P. Chase Equal Rights League in Beaufort, he addressed the crowd of over 2,000 freedmen and demanded "all equal rights before the law, and nothing more."

On August 22, a New Bern assembly issued a public call for the holding of statewide freedmen's convention in Raleigh. Six days later, Galloway dominated a following assembly in New Bern. Delivering the keynote address, he called for the provision of schools for blacks to ameliorate illiteracy and renewed his demands for black suffrage, though he conceded he was willing to compromise on enfranchisement by allowing for some restrictions on all prospective voters without regard to race, such as the use of literacy tests. The crowd ultimately elected him, Randolph, and George W. Price to advertise the convention. Galloway, Good, Randolph, and AME missionary George A. Rue were later selected by an assembly of local Equal Rights Leagues to be New Bern's delegates.

The freedmen's convention convened at Loyal African Methodist Episcopal Church in Raleigh on September 29, three days before the start of the state's official constitutional convention. Galloway called the delegates to order and named Good as the body's temporary president. Unlike many of the eastern delegates who had been elected by assemblies to represent the interests of blacks in their home regions, many delegates from North Carolina's interior had chosen to attend the convention on their own initiative. On the motion of James Harris of Raleigh, the congress declared itself a "mass convention" open to all delegates who arrived in good faith. The interior delegates and the convention as a whole tended to seek a conciliatory posture towards white society. Galloway frequently participated in the debates and by contrast forcefully demanded black suffrage, civil liberties, workers' rights, racial equality in the judicial system, and the creation of a public school system for blacks.

Among various resolutions adopted by the body was one to establish a committee led by Harris to draft a letter to the state constitutional convention representing the freedmen's views on equality. The letter assumed a conservative and deferential tone and focused on requests for economic relief, making only a vague appeal for the undoing of discriminatory legislation and omitting mentions of suffrage or full legal equality. The convention designated Harris, Good, and Galloway as messengers to deliver the letter to the constitutional convention and invite Governor William Woods Holden to speak before them. Holden declined the invitation. The delegates' final act was to declare themselves a new North Carolina Equal Rights League headquartered in Raleigh, supplanting the original one created a year prior in New Bern.

The convention ultimately had little immediate political impact in North Carolina, as Presidential Reconstruction under Andrew Johnson left the political role of blacks to the discretion of the governments of the Southern states, and consequently they ignored the demands of freedmen. In 1866, Conservatives (Note: The grouping known as the "Conservative Party" in North Carolina referred to a coalition of former Whigs and Democrats who opposed Republicans during the Reconstruction era. The Republicans often referred to the Conservatives as "Democrats" when criticizing them to associate them with the pre-war party. They officially reorganized as the North Carolina Democratic Party in 1876.) in the North Carolina General Assembly voted against ratifying the Fourteenth Amendment to the U.S. Constitution—which would have guaranteed full citizenship and due process to former slaves—and passed a series of Black Codes which restricted the legal and economic rights of freedmen.

== Move to Wilmington and organization of the Republican Party ==
Galloway, his wife, and their newborn son moved to Wilmington sometime after the freedmen's convention in Raleigh. His mother had returned from Boston and formally married Amos Galloway—Abraham's stepfather—and together with their son John—Abraham's half brother—moved into a house on North Fourth Street across from the home of Hankins, Abraham's former owner. Abraham Galloway and his family moved into the house. How he supported his family is unknown, and they lived with little money. Galloway family legend says that local black churches supplied his family with means to live so that he would not have to rely on the employment or patronage of whites. Galloway's wife gave birth to a second son in February 1870.

Galloway had little involvement in public affairs for over a year after moving to Wilmington, not appearing involved in Equal Rights League activities or participating in a second state freedmen's convention held in Raleigh in October 1866. He joined a Masonic lodge and attended St. Paul's Episcopal Church with his wife. Politically, Wilmington was dominated by white conservatives and the wealthy and while there was significant black political activity, the black community did not display the same capacity for organization as blacks in New Bern had developed during the war.

"There is a bright future before us—the day of rejoicing at hand. Let us stand united. Let there be no divisions. Let us shout that we are a people, and that our freedom is not a bar to our advancement. Let the work go on, and be hopeful, for the Great Jehovah still hears the prayers of the downtrodden."

— Extract from Galloway's speech to a gathering in Wilmington, November 14, 1867

Meanwhile, Radical Republicans in the U.S. Congress grew dissatisfied with the passage of Black Codes and white-instigated racial violence in the South and the inaction of President Johnson on these developments. In 1867, they passed a series of Reconstruction Acts which placed the Southern states under military authority, stripped former Confederate officials of political rights, and required states of the former Confederacy to ratify new constitutions which guaranteed universal male suffrage.

With the opportunity for a new state constitution and black political participation imminent, Galloway began organizing Wilmington's blacks in support of North Carolina's nascent Republican Party. On July 20, 1867, he delivered an hour-long address at Thalian Hall imploring blacks to become Republicans and declaring himself fully committed to the party. Over subsequent weeks, he delivered speeches at local Republican clubs and black civic organizations, traveling to Brunswick County and Whiteville to spread his message. The August 27 edition of the Wilmington Daily Post printed a letter from Galloway exhorting Republicans to organize "campaign clubs" for each city ward which would meet weekly to discuss political issues and send delegates to a citywide convention to nominate candidates for local office. Historian William McKee Evans wrote that, ideologically, Galloway "lay somewhere between the Whiggish and the Radical Republicans". (Note: In contrast to this assessment, contemporary critics characterized Galloway as a Radical and a "Jacobin". Evans speculates that the reason for this characterization was Galloway's critics' dissatisfaction with his rhetoric with regards to issues of race and his own mixed heritage.)

Galloway served as a delegate at North Carolina's first State Republican Convention in 1867. He delivered the opening speech at the assembly, urging the other delegates to "go everywhere there is a black man or a poor white man and tell him the true condition of the Republican Party." Though the body did not nominate any black candidates for statewide office, Galloway told a gathering in Wilmington after the convention that he was ready to "bury all our difficulties now and commence afresh." The Wilmington Daily Post paraphrased him, writing, "The half Negro that was in him loved liberty and he believed that it could be obtained only through the Republican Party." His political activities continued in anticipation of a new constitution. Addressing a procession from atop the city market house, he predicted that blacks would be able to vote for a legal framework that would give them a new opportunity for political equality, declaring, "In this it will be left to them whether or not they will voluntarily remain where they are."

== Constitutional convention of 1868 ==
On October 17, 1867, the New Hanover County Republican convention nominated Galloway as one of three candidates—the others, Joseph Carter Abbott and Samuel S. Ashley, being white northerners—for the delegation to the state constitutional convention. Voters in the county overwhelmingly voted in favor of calling a new constitutional convention and confirmed Galloway, Abbott, and Ashley as their delegates. Afterwards, Galloway joined meetings with local and state Republicans to discuss issues that they intended to cover at the convention and traveled with a delegation of Southern Unionists to Washington D.C. to meet with Republican congressional leader Thaddeus Stevens.

The state constitutional convention lasted from January to March 1868. Galloway was one of 13 black delegates to attend it. A Republican newspaper quoted Galloway as saying on his attendance, "I came here to help the poor white man, as well as the colored man, and to do justice to all men." The New Hanover delegation was especially active in the convention; The Wilmington Daily Journal claimed that Galloway and Abbott were "running the machine" and reported that on the convention's first day Galloway had nominated its president, secretary, and doorkeeper. (Note: Calvin J. Cowles served as convention president. Both the Raleigh Sentinel and The Wilmington Daily Journal attributed his nomination to Galloway, while the official convention journal attributes the motion to James Harris. According to constitutional scholar Ann McColl, Galloway made the initial nomination but, before a vote could be taken, a debate on procedure occurred. Following this, Harris moved the nomination, and a vote was taken.) On the convention's second day—its first full day of business—Galloway and Abbott spoke on the floor numerous times. Galloway also suggested that an official "reporter" be appointed to provide coverage of the assembly's proceedings, and the body eventually appointed Joseph W. Holden to the role.

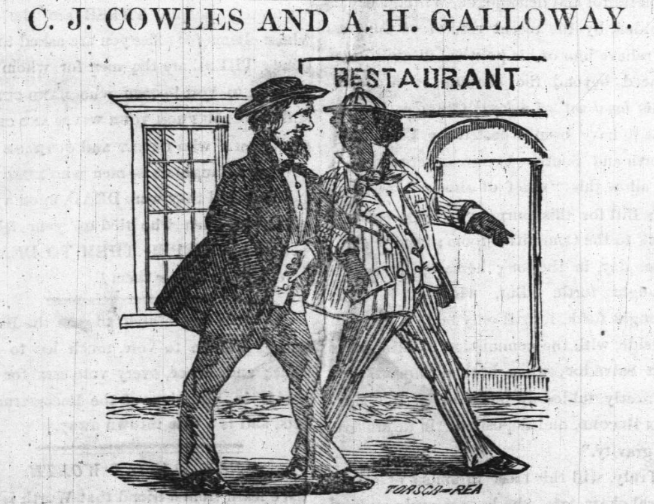
Political cartoon depicting Calvin J. Cowles and Galloway going to dine together at a restaurant in Raleigh during the 1868 state constitutional convention

The convention was organized into 13 committees to study various issues. Galloway served on the Committee on Counties, Cities, etc. and the Committee on the Judicial Department and was also a member of the convention's five-member rules-of-order committee, which structured its daily agenda. He participated in most floor debates. In the discussions, he denounced an attempt to constitutionally require racial segregation in public schools and proposed a measure to prohibit racial discrimination in businesses and methods of transportation open to the public. He opposed an amendment providing for the election of judges by the state legislature and vocalized his support for their popular election, but ultimately did not vote on the motion making them so. He also declared that he was opposed to any repudiation of private debts, except those incurred to support the Confederate war effort or to purchase slaves after the issuing of the Emancipation Proclamation. He also opposed attempts to repudiate the state debt but did introduce a successful motion to absolve counties of any debts incurred to assist the war effort. Despite being overshadowed by chairman Albion W. Tourgée on the Committee on Counties, Cities, he presented the body's report on Wilmington to the convention and presented a petition for new municipal elections in the city.

Conservative North Carolina newspapers denounced the convention, often in racist terms, and Galloway's prominent role at the convention horrified Wilmington's press. The Wilmington Daily Journal derided him as a "claybank". The Conservative press also found scandal when Galloway was witnessed dining with white convention president Calvin J. Cowles in a Raleigh restaurant. The Conservative delegates at the convention pushed arguments of black inferiority, provoking Galloway to declare in a debate concerning equal suffrage that though his white father's blood was "the best blood in Brunswick County," if he could he would "lance myself and let it out."

On January 31, Galloway opened the convention's proceedings by holding up an issue of a Raleigh newspaper, The Carolinian, which had described black delegates using the epithet "nigger". Outraged by the insult, Galloway informed the convention, according to an attending journalist, that "if he could not obtain redress here, he would seek it elsewhere". (Note: Cecelski believes by that by saying this Galloway was threatening to challenge the responsible journalist to a duel.) His pronouncement spawned a long debate among the delegates about whether or not the word "nigger" should be interpreted as an insult, the proper ways of describing a black man, and the First Amendment rights of journalists attending the session. After viewing the notes of The Carolinian's reporter, the convention president decided to expel him from the chamber. When one Conservative delegate protested the expulsion, Galloway quipped that, "the gentleman had protested against the advance of the Union army [too], but failed to do anything [about it]."

The convention concluded its business on March 16 and issued a new draft constitution, which provided for universal male suffrage, removed property requirements for office seekers, made state executive and county offices elective, improved women's property rights, supported a system of public education, and reformed the state criminal code. It was scheduled to be put to a referendum for ratification during the state's general elections on April 21. Galloway returned to Wilmington to be present for his first son's baptism on March 22.

== State Senate career ==
=== Campaign and election ===
Political tensions heightened in the Wilmington region in the aftermath of the constitutional convention, with bulletins penned by the white supremacist Ku Klux Klan organization being posted around the city in late March. Klan activities increased over the course of April, with Klansmen drawing a cart through Wilmington full of bones and hanging a skeleton near the city post office in an attempt to intimidate black voters. Wilmington's blacks resisted the intimidation campaign, with many choosing to go about the city armed with pistols and fence rails and organizing themselves into informal militias. Galloway, for his part, often walked around with a pistol in his belt.

Galloway returned to Wilmington to find that local Republicans had nominated him as a candidate for a seat in the North Carolina Senate representing New Hanover and Brunswick counties. He travelled throughout the constituency to campaign and promoted other Republicans at meetings in Columbus and Sampson counties. At an appearance in Clinton, a man attacked Galloway with a bowie knife while he gave a speech. He avoided harm but was then confronted by a lynch mob. Galloway later credited his extrication from the situation to the intervention of a local Conservative newspaper editor. On April 20, the day before the election began, he led a torchlight procession of armed blacks through Wilmington to demonstrate solidarity against the Klan. The Klan apparently never confronted the group. Its influence waned and it did not reappear in Wilmington throughout the remainder of Reconstruction. In the April 21 election, North Carolina voters ratified the new constitution and Galloway won election to the senate seat, securing 3,569 votes to his opponent's 2,235.

Following his own election, Galloway remained active in local politics, serving as a marshal of a Grand Army of the Republic Memorial Day parade and addressing an annual joint gathering of Wilmington's black political and fraternal associations. He also supported other Republicans seeking office in the local, state executive, and national elections scheduled for the fall. A Republican convention for North Carolina's Third Electoral District of the Electoral College nominated Galloway as a presidential elector. As a result of this, Galloway appeared on the statewide ballot alongside the other elector candidates and the gubernatorial and presidential candidates, making him the first black person to ever appear on a North Carolina statewide ballot. In the November election, he secured election as North Carolina's first black elector and subsequently delivered his vote on behalf of his district in favor of Republican presidential candidate Ulysses S. Grant. Holden, who had been returned to gubernatorial office through that year's elections, appointed Galloway lieutenant colonel and commander of the 1st Regiment, North Carolina Defense Militia, a detachment organized by blacks in Wilmington.

=== Tenure ===
Galloway was one of three black senators and 13 black representatives to serve that legislative term in the 1868 North Carolina General Assembly. The 1868 legislature met in two sessions. During the first session, Galloway served on the Committee on Propositions and Grievances, the Committee on Military Affairs, and State Prison and Penitentiary Committee, as well as a special committee tasked with choosing the site of a new penitentiary. He continued to serve on the Committee on Propositions and Grievances and the Committee on Military Affairs in the second session.

Galloway was the most active of the colored senators during his term, speaking frequently in the senate and introducing significant amounts of legislation. He regularly met with other Republican legislators in Raleigh after daily proceedings to strategize and form agendas and was viewed by his contemporaries as a political spokesman for the state's black population. Galloway involved himself in both matters of importance to the whole state as well as local concerns, such as channel dredging activities and portage rates, which impacted the function of the port of Wilmington. He also developed a reputation as a fierce debater. While he often delivered remarks which rankled Democratic leaders, Galloway also clashed with members of his own party, at one point calling for a joint committee to investigate the Republican senator from Craven County, who had been accused of taking bribes, to ascertain whether he "had sold himself to Democrats". Following a separate heated debate, he almost engaged in a fight with black Republican Senator Isham Sweat when they met on the street. Galloway focused much of his rhetoric against railroads, which he criticized as "opulent and influential corporations", and held a public vendetta against North Carolina Railroad president William Alexander Smith. In 1869, he introduced a resolution urging the governor to remove Smith from the railroad. (Note: Evans wrote concerning Galloway's frequent clashes with those around him, "Galloway was and remained very much a product of the class that he so hated. [...] He shared their chivalrous deference towards women, and their fragile sense of honor. He had the irrational and reckless courage characteristic of a member of a hereditary military caste. [...] There was always danger to his brittle dignity.")

Much of Galloway's senate tenure concerned the rights of freedmen. He voted for ratification of the 14th and 15th amendments to the U.S. Constitution, which respectively guaranteed full citizenship and full voting rights to all persons regardless of race, color, or previous condition of servitude. He also advocated for black service on juries, which, while permitted by the 1868 North Carolina constitution, was often ignored by county governments in Galloway's view. In 1870, Galloway introduced a bill which lowered the standard of evidence for property owners seeking to demonstrate that real estate belonged to them. The measure was designed to provide relief to freedmen who had been bequeathed homes or land while they had been enslaved even without titles. The bill was ultimately passed into law. He also demonstrated concern with labor issues, with his first bill proposal being an unsuccessful attempt to limit laborers to a 10-hour work day.

Issues of race and color frequently arose in the 1868 legislature. Galloway often took offense towards conservative views on blacks and racial intermixing. After one legislator used derogatory terms to denounce the racial composition of the New Bern city council, Galloway threatened that he would "hold [him] responsible for his language, outside this Hall." He also made frequent reference to his mixed parentage, particularly when attempting to frame Democrats' remarks on the supposed sexual threat black men posed to white women as hypocritical. Other times he flatly accused white men of sexually pursuing black women. Such comments outraged The Wilmington Journal, which on one occasion wrote that the senator had made "indelicate remarks in regards to [...] white men mingling with negroes which we omit for the sake of decency." On July 6, 1868, he amended a proposal to racially segregate the senate galleries by offering an optional middle section that could be occupied by all races.

Galloway heavily involved himself in the recreation of the state school system, supporting a bill which provided for a four-month school term. Galloway and James Harris—who had been elected to the House of Representatives—pushed for communities to be given a local option to raise property taxes to fund for additional schooling, though the measure was eventually defeated by the Conservatives and several white Republicans who feared over-taxation of property owners. During a debate on racially segregating schools on February 26, 1869, a senator proposed an amendment to a bill that would bar black teachers from being employed in any school with white students. Another senator, with Galloway's support, altered the amendment to also exclude white teachers from teaching black students. Galloway then further moved to add a specific provision stipulating that "no white Democrat should teach any colored girl" but was ruled out of order. The entire amendment was later quashed and the General Assembly passed the new schooling legislation, though requests by Galloway and other black legislators for equal funding for black schools or the possibility of racially integrated schools were passed over.

Galloway supported efforts by Governor Holden to curtail the violent activities of the Ku Klux Klan in the state. In 1868, he spoke and voted in favor of a bill establishing a state militia, citing the need to protect the political rights of all citizens under possible threat. Over the course of 1869, Klan violence against blacks and Republican politicians proliferated the Piedmont and eastern regions of North Carolina. In December, a Republican state senator proposed a new militia bill which would give the governor greater power and authority to suppress the Klan. Galloway declared his support for the measure, citing the testimony of two colored men who had been assaulted by Klansmen. Democrats worked to delay and weaken the legislation, with some defending the Klan as an organization necessary for the preservation of law and order and curtailing black criminal activity. Galloway denounced the Klan for committing murder "every other day" and declared that "it was the purpose and understanding of the Democratic Party to oppose everything for the benefit of society and to give more power to these miserable murderers who are now troubling the entire country." The militia bill was ultimately passed into law as the Shoffner Act in January 1870.

Galloway was a strong supporter of women's rights. Following an 1868 ruling by the North Carolina Supreme Court which permitted husbands to beat their wives, Galloway attempted to force the Senate Committee on the Judiciary to produce a bill restricting domestic violence. In February 1869, he proposed a bill to protect wives from abandonment by their husbands. In 1869 and 1870, he proposed amending the state constitution to give women the right to vote.

=== 1870 elections ===
Conservative and Democratic strength grew in North Carolina over the course of 1869 and 1870, while the Republican Party became increasingly burdened by factionalism, particularly among opposing camps of black voters who disagreed over how closely to ally themselves with white Republicans. Galloway denounced the Democratic leadership and remained steadfast in his support of a unified Republican Party. The Republican convention for North Carolina's 3rd congressional district held in Lumberton on May 8, 1870, devolved due to infighting. Galloway chaired the New Hanover delegation to the meeting, though after the delegation split on a slate of preferred candidates between the official group led by Galloway and a minority faction led by George Price—who had since returned to Wilmington after his time in New Bern during the war—Galloway and two others resigned from the convention. Democrats prevailed in most contests in the state elections held on August 4, though Galloway won reelection to the senate. He survived another assassination attempt several days later but ultimately died before he could resume his seat in the senate. Price was subsequently elected to fill the vacancy.

== Death and legacy ==
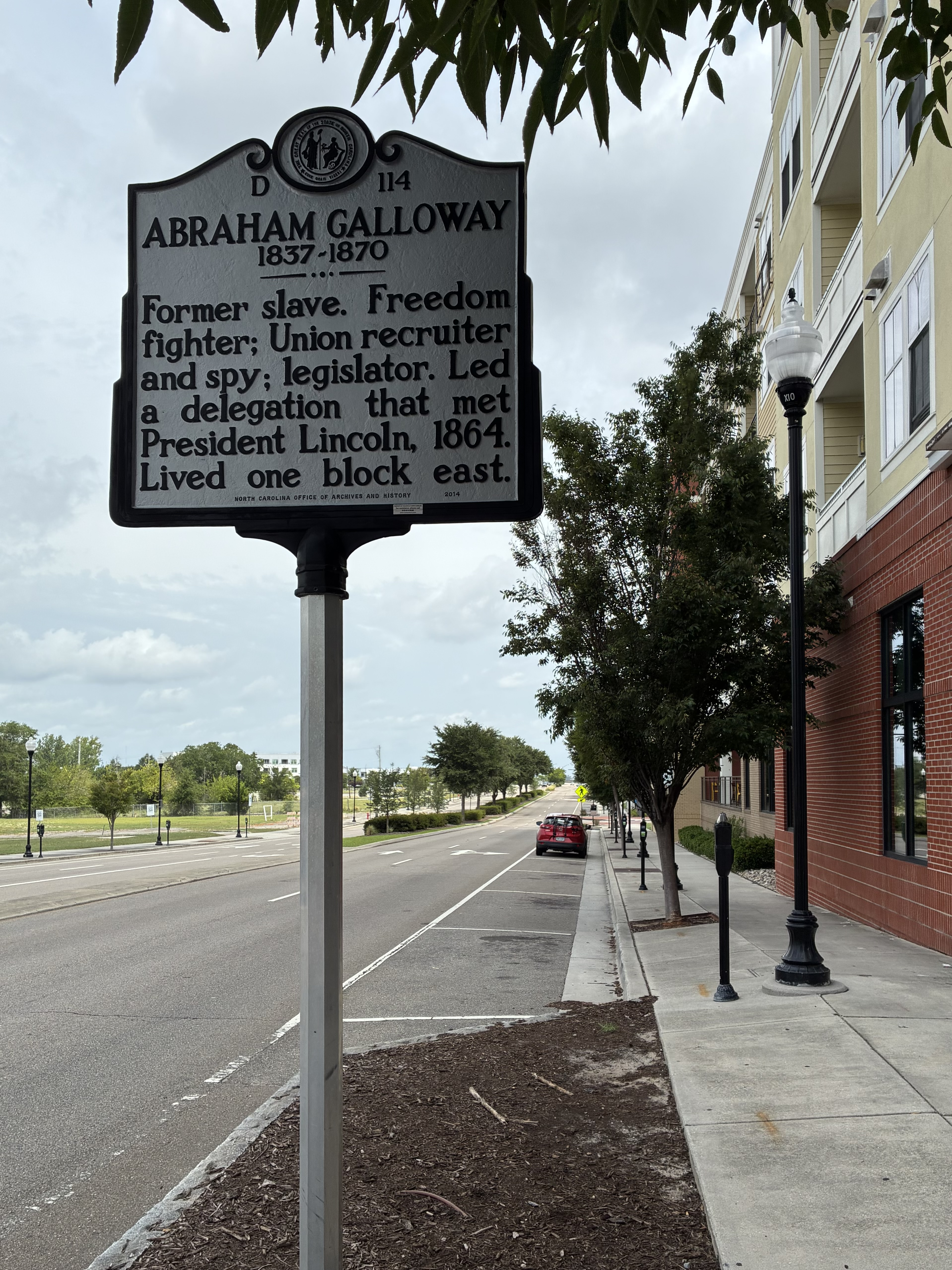
Historical marker commemorating Galloway in Wilmington

Galloway fell ill and died unexpectedly at his mother's house in Wilmington on September 1, 1870. Most press reports stated he had succumbed to fever and jaundice, though his wife later disclosed that he had suffered from bouts of rheumatism and "heart troubles". Obituaries were printed for him in the local press, The Christian Recorder, and newspapers in Washington, D.C., Philadelphia, and New York City. The New National Era lamented that he died "very poor". A funeral was held for him in Wilmington two days later. Local courts closed for the morning and American flags flew at half-mast. An estimated 6,000 mourners gathered to witness the funeral procession from his home to St. Paul's Episcopal Church, where ceremonies were held. His coffin was escorted by a delegation of legislators, Masons, black firefighters, and members of various other black civic organizations. Galloway was buried in Pine Forest Cemetery, Wilmington's burial grounds for blacks, but the location of his actual grave is uncertain due to conflicting cemetery records and haphazard boundary keeping practices. His widow later returned to Beaufort with their two sons and remarried.

Several letters attributed to Galloway and addressed to Governor Holden are preserved in the State Archives of North Carolina. In the 2010s, activists in Wilmington formed the Friends of Abraham Galloway organization and lobbied the North Carolina Office of Archives and History to erect a historical marker honoring Galloway in the city. On October 3, 2014, a North Carolina Highway Historical Marker dedicated to Abraham Galloway was unveiled at Third Street and Brunswick Street in Wilmington. Howard Craft later wrote a one-man play about Galloway, The Fire of Freedom, based upon David Cecelski's biography of him. A quote by Galloway is inscribed on a wall at North Carolina Freedom Park, which opened in 2023, and a portrait of him hangs in the senate chamber of the North Carolina State Legislative Building.

== See also ==
- African American officeholders from the end of the Civil War until before 1900

== Works cited ==
- Alexander, Roberta Sue (1985). North Carolina Faces the Freedmen : Race Relations During Presidential Reconstruction 1865–67. Durham: Duke University Press. ISBN 0-8223-0628-X.
- Balanoff, Elizabeth (January 1972). "Negro Legislators in the North Carolina General Assembly, July, 1868-February, 1872". The North Carolina Historical Review. 49 (1): 22–55. JSTOR 23529002.
- Beckel, Deborah (2010). Radical Reform: Interracial Politics in Post-Emancipation North Carolina. University of Virginia Press. ISBN 9780813930527.
- Bernstein, Leonard (October 1949). "The Participation of Negro Delegates in the Constitutional Convention of 1868 in North Carolina". The Journal of Negro History. 34 (4): 391–409. doi:10.2307/2715607. JSTOR 2715607.
- Bishir, Catherine W. (2013). Crafting Lives : African American Artisans in New Bern, North Carolina, 1770-1900. Chapel Hill: The University of North Carolina Press. ISBN 9781469608761.
- Brisson, Jim D. (April 2011). "'Civil Government Was Crumbling Around Me': The Kirk-Holden War of 1870". The North Carolina Historical Review. 8 (2): 123–163. JSTOR 23523540.
- Cecelski, David (2012). The Fire of Freedom: Abraham Galloway and the Slaves' Civil War. Chapel Hill: University of North Carolina. ISBN 978-1-4696-2190-6.
- Crow, Jeffrey J.; Durden, Robert F. (1977). Maverick Republican in the Old North State : A Political Biography of Daniel L. Russell. Baton Rouge: Louisiana State University Press. ISBN 9780807102916.
- Evans, William McKee (1995) [1966]. Ballots and Fence Rails: Reconstruction on the Lower Cape Fear (reprint ed.). Athens: University of Georgia Press. ISBN 0-8203-1731-4.
- Orth, John V. (September 1992). "Tuesday, February 11, 1868: The Day North Carolina Chose Direct Election of Judges--A Transcript of the Debates from the 1868 Constitutional Convention". North Carolina Law Review. 70 (6): 1825–1851.
- Trelease, Allen W. (1991). The North Carolina Railroad, 1849–1871, and the Modernization of North Carolina. Chapel Hill: University of North Carolina Press. ISBN 9780807819418.
- Watson, Alan D. (1987). A History of New Bern and Craven County. New Bern: Tryon Palace Commission. OCLC 17398679.
- Zucchino, David (2021). Wilmington's Lie: The Murderous Coup of 1898 and the Rise of White Supremacy. New York: Grove Press. ISBN 978-0-8021-4865-0.
