= John R. Good =

American politician (1815–1878)

Member of the North Carolina House of Representatives from Craven County
- In office November 16, 1874 – 1875

Personal details
- Born: 1815
- Died: April 1878 (aged 62–63) New Bern, North Carolina
- Party: Republican

John R. Good (1815 – April 1878) was an American freedman and politician in North Carolina who became an advocate for the rights of African-Americans and freed slaves. Born enslaved in 1815, he was emancipated by legislative act in 1855 and ran a successful barbering business in New Bern, North Carolina before the outbreak of the American Civil War. Good emerged as a leading figure in New Bern's black community during the war and assisted with refugee relief efforts. In April 1864, he was part of a delegation of six black eastern North Carolina civic leaders which met with U.S. President Abraham Lincoln at the White House to advocate for the political rights of freedmen. In September 1865 he was heavily involved in a statewide convention of freedmen which met in Raleigh and elected him vice president of the North Carolina Equal Rights League. He attended a subsequent convention the following year. A member of the Republican Party, he was elected to New Bern's board of alderman in 1869 and 1870 and served in the North Carolina House of Representatives from 1874 to 1875. He died in 1878.

== Early life and emancipation ==
John R. Good was born enslaved in 1815. Described as mulatto, he was owned by carpenter Benjamin C. Good of New Bern, North Carolina. Benjamin Good wrote in his will in 1827, "I give my Mulatto boy Jack his freedom when he arrives to the Age of Twenty-five and in case my Heirs do not give said boy his time, they shall forfeit their Heirship to any of my estate." Following his death, John's ownership passed to Benjamin's two young daughters. With the depletion of the Good estate, John's labor provided economically for the daughters as they grew up, and past the age of 25 he remained enslaved. One of the daughters died and in 1847 the surviving one, Eliza, married New Bern artisan George Bishop, making him the legal owner of John. Seeking to honor the terms of Benjamin's will, Bishop sought to emancipate John, though, by the 1840s, private manumissions were heavily restricted in North Carolina.

On November 21, 1848, Bishop placed a notice in the Newbernian and North Carolina Advocate that he intended to appeal to the North Carolina General Assembly to emancipate John by legislative act. By the following month, State Senator William Henry Washington had introduced a bill which would emancipate John and permit him to remain in the state, an exception to state law which compelled all freed slaves to leave upon their manumission. Washington explained his actions in the December 26 edition of the Advocate and supplied the General Assembly with a petition from New Bernians assuring the legislators that John was "honest, sober, industrious, and useful to the Town". The bill ultimately did not pass, but Bishop persisted in his efforts and in late 1854 convinced the General Assembly to reconsider manumission. A petition from the citizens of Craven County also supported John's emancipation. The Newbern Journal wrote "There is not, in our opinion, a more deserving slave in the State of North Carolina." An act granting John freedom was ultimately passed and ratified on January 20, 1855, and provided for a $1,000 bond to be posted to ensure his good behavior to the state.

Good married a woman, Anna, who died in 1856. The 1860 United States census recorded Good as a free mulatto working in New Bern as a barber. Free persons of color dominated the barbering profession in the city in the antebellum period and Good's business prospered.

== Political career ==
=== Early activities ===
Good emerged as a leading figure in New Bern's black community during the American Civil War and assisted with refugee relief efforts. He was also briefly involved in the caretaking of Greenwood Cemetery, the town's cemetery for blacks. In December 1863, he was interviewed by Robert Hamilton, publisher of the New York-based Anglo-African, who was touring Union-held areas in the South.

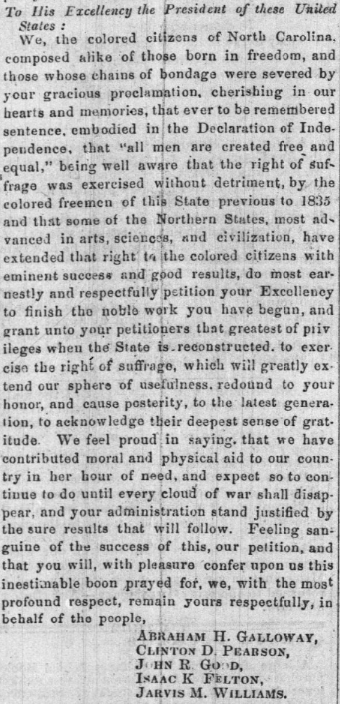
Petition of Good and other black leaders delivered to President Lincoln at their meeting in the White House as reproduced in the North Carolina Times

On April 29, 1864, Good was part of a delegation of six black leaders—the others being Edward H. Hill, Clinton D. Pierson, Abraham Galloway, and Isaac K. Felton of New Bern and Jarvis M. Williams of Washington, North Carolina—who met with U.S. President Abraham Lincoln at the White House in Washington, D.C.. According to historian David Cecelski, while Lincoln had met with black leaders from the North earlier in the war, "This seems to have been his first meeting with African American leaders from the South." The delegation entered the White House through the front door—a courtesy the men were unfamiliar with—and had a polite and frank discussion with the president about the political future of black freedmen. Good spoke little at the meeting. They then presented a petition on behalf of black North Carolinians, asking that blacks be guaranteed full political equality at the conclusion of the war. Afterwards, the men walked to the U.S. Capitol and distributed copies of their petition to U.S. Congressmen.

Following the visit to Washington, Good, Galloway, Pierson, and Hill went on a tour of Northern states to promote support for black suffrage. On May 4, they addressed the congregation of Zion Church in New York City. Good spoke only briefly and with difficulty. Hamilton of The Anglo-African wrote, "We were remarkably struck with this gentleman's manner. He had dwelt amid the horrors for too long, and seen so much of it he seemed too full for utterance. Tears and action would have better suited him than words." Galloway and the other delegates to Washington returned to New Bern in early June and held a meeting at Andrew Chapel to report on their meeting with the president. Good gave the attendees a full recounting of the meeting, saying that Lincoln spoke "freely and kindly" with them but that the president preferred to leave the future political rights of blacks up to the determination of individual states after the war.

=== Freedmen organizing and Equal Rights League ===
Meanwhile, preparations were made in Syracuse, New York to host a "National Convention of Colored Men" in October. Mass meetings were held in New Bern's black community to assemble a delegation. Good, Pierson, and John Randolph Jr. were chosen to represent the city, though the mass meetings exposed a rift between local black leaders and James Walker Hood, an AME Zion missionary who had been dispatched from the North to aid the city. Over the course of the summer the city was battered by a regional yellow fever epidemic and heavy federal conscription of black labor caused unrest and community divisions. Feeling it prudent to provide the black community with a sense of reconciliation, Good, Pierson, and Randolph resigned their mandate and joined with others in a mass meeting in electing Galloway to serve as the city's delegate.

On January 1, 1865, Good cofounded and became foreman of Harland Fire Company No. 1, one of two new "colored" firefighting companies in New Bern. The companies disbanded within three years.

On August 22, 1865, a New Bern assembly issued a public call for the holding of a statewide freedmen's convention in Raleigh. Presiding over the meeting, Good said that such a convention was "to take such measures as will advance the welfare of the colored people of this state...The white people...are about to hold conventions for the purpose of reconstruction, and it is necessary that the colored people should take such steps as may influence these conventions and promote our good." Good, Galloway, Randolph, and AME missionary George A. Rue were later selected by an assembly of local Equal Rights Leagues to be New Bern's delegates. The freedmen's convention convened at Loyal African Methodist Episcopal Church in Raleigh on September 29, three days before the start of the state's official constitutional convention. Galloway called the delegates to order and named Good as the body's temporary president. Hood was elected permanent president.

Among various resolutions adopted by the body was one to establish a committee led by James Harris and on which Good served to draft a letter to the state constitutional convention representing the freedmen's views on equality. The letter assumed a conservative and deferential tone and focused on appeals for economic relief, making only a vague appeal for the undoing of discriminatory legislation and omitting mentions of suffrage or full legal equality. The convention designated Harris, Good, and Galloway as messengers to deliver the letter to the constitutional convention and invite Governor William Woods Holden to speak before them. Holden declined the invitation. The delegates' final act was to declare themselves a new North Carolina Equal Rights League headquartered in Raleigh, supplanting the original one created a year prior in New Bern. They elected Good vice president of the new league. At Harris' insistence, a second freedmen's convention was held in the same place in Raleigh in October 1866. Good attended as a delegate and welcomed Governor Jonathan Worth when he addressed the assembly on invitation, describing the governor as a friend and reporting that Worth had voted in favor of his manumission as a state legislator.

=== Republican politics ===
Good attended the North Carolina Republican Party's founding state convention in Raleigh in 1867 and served as one of the convention's vice presidents. In May 1869, he was elected as a member of the Republican Party to represent a ward on New Bern's board of aldermen. He was reelected in January 1870. That year, he cofounded a burial society, the Mechanics' and Laborers' Mutual Aid Society of North Carolina, and two years later cofounded the Newbern Educational Association. He also served on the board of trustees for the New Bern Academy. Good was elected to represent Craven County in the North Carolina House of Representatives in 1874. Sworn-in with the rest of the House on November 16, 1874, he served until 1875. He was appointed a vice member of the Board of Directors for the State Insane Asylum after the close of the 1875 legislative session by Governor Curtis Hooks Brogden and reappointed to that role by Governor Zebulon Vance on March 5, 1877.

== Later life ==
Good suffered an attack of "apoplexy" while walking in New Bern on April 24, 1878 and died at his home a few days later.

== Works cited ==
- Alexander, Roberta Sue (1985). North Carolina Faces the Freedmen : Race Relations During Presidential Reconstruction 1865–67. Durham: Duke University Press. ISBN 0-8223-0628-X.
- Bishir, Catherine W. (2013). Crafting Lives : African American Artisans in New Bern, North Carolina, 1770-1900. Chapel Hill: The University of North Carolina Press. ISBN 9781469608761.
- Cecelski, David (2012). The Fire of Freedom: Abraham Galloway and the Slaves' Civil War. Chapel Hill: University of North Carolina. ISBN 978-1-4696-2190-6.
- Friend, Craig Thomas (2025). Becoming Lunsford Lane : The Lives of an American Aeneas. Chapel Hill: University of North Carolina Press. ISBN 9781469683867.
- Houston, Claudia B. (2018). "History of the New Bern Fire Department History Part II: Post Civil War" (PDF). Journal of the New Bern Historical Society. XXV (1): 3–14.
- Little, Ruth M. (2016), New Bern Historic District Boundary Increase II (PDF), National Register of Historic Places, United States Department of the Interior
- Raper, Horace W. (1985). William W. Holden: North Carolina's Political Enigma. Chapel Hill: University of North Carolina Press. ISBN 0807850608.
- Watson, Alan D. (1987). A History of New Bern and Craven County. New Bern: Tryon Palace Commission. OCLC 17398679.
