= John Randolph Jr. =

John Randolph Jr. (October 18, 1827 – November 22, 1890) was an American politician. Born enslaved near Washington, North Carolina, he was freed upon the arrival of federal troops in New Bern during the American Civil War. Following his emancipation, Randolph rose to become a leading black civic figure in the city.

== Early life ==
John Randolph Jr. was born into slavery on October 18, 1827 near Washington, North Carolina. His parents were John Randolph Sr. and Harriet Ore Randolph, and he had several siblings. Despite his enslavement, he learned to read and write. (Note: Historian David Cecelski argues that Randolph was literate despite United States census records indicating otherwise, noting that contemporary accounts describe him as politically sophisticated and one 1867 report indicates that he read the United States Declaration of Independence aloud to a political gathering.) Historian Catherine Bishir wrote that he worked as a painter while journalist Sidney Andrews described him as being a carpenter. Randolph married Della Raymond in 1851 and had several children with her. By 1870, his first wife had died and he had married Kate Green. One of his daughters, Fannie, married George Henry White, a prominent black politician, in 1879. Randolph and his family relocated from Washington to New Bern by the American Civil War and he was freed upon the capture of New Bern by federal troops.

== Career ==
Following his emancipation, Randolph rose to become a leading black civic figure in Union-occupied New Bern. In May 1863, Edward Kinsley, an abolitionist and an emissary of Massachusetts Governor John Albion Andrew, traveled to New Bern to investigate the possibility of recruiting blacks to serve in the Union Army. Kinsley managed to secure a meeting with local black leaders one night in a private home, among whom was Randolph, Abraham Galloway, and minister Isaac K. Felton. The black leaders demanded, among other things, that blacks would be recruited on the condition that they would be serving in a struggle to end slavery, not only preserve the territorial integrity of the United States. The negotiations proved contentious and lasted into the morning, but Kinsley eventually ceded to their demands. While Galloway left the city, Kinsley secured the cooperation of Brigadier General John G. Foster, the federal commander in New Bern, in creating a new black unit, and arranged a meeting with Randolph. Kinsley informed Randolph of Foster's support for their plans and encouraged him and the other black leaders to recruit escaped slaves to the federal cause. Several days later, Randolph, Galloway, and Felton led a procession of slaves into New Bern.

Advertisement in the September 8, 1865 edition of The Wilmington Herald calling on the city's freed population to send delegates to a state convention in Raleigh.

At the behest of Northern black ministers Henry Highland Garnet and Jermain Wesley Loguen preparations were made in Syracuse, New York to host a "National Convention of Colored Men" in October 1864. Mass meetings were held in New Bern's black community to assemble a delegation. Randolph, Clinton D. Pierson, and John R. Good were chosen to represent the city, though the mass meetings exposed a rift between local black leaders and James Walker Hood, an AME Zion missionary who had been dispatched from the North to aid the city. Over the course of the summer the city was battered by a regional yellow fever epidemic—which eventually killed Galloway's father off the coast of Bermuda—and heavy federal conscription of black labor caused unrest and community divisions. Feeling it prudent to provide the black community with a sense of reconciliation, Pierson, Good, and Randolph resigned their mandate and joined with others in a mass meeting in electing Galloway to serve as the city's delegate. The convention created the National Equal Rights League. Randolph subsequently authored an "Equal Rights League Song" which was published in The Anglo-African. On January 1, 1865, Randolph founded the Kimball Fire Company in New Bern. It disbanded within a few years.

On August 22, 1865 a New Bern assembly issued a public call for the holding of statewide freedmen's convention in Raleigh and appointed a small committee to advertise it, including Randolph. Galloway, Good, Randolph, and AME missionary George A. Rue were later selected by an assembly of local Equal Rights Leagues to be New Bern's delegates. The freedmen's convention convened at Loyal African Methodist Episcopal Church in Raleigh on September 29, three days before the start of the state's official constitutional convention. Randolph was elected by the delegates to serve as convention secretary.

Unlike many of the eastern delegates who had been elected by assemblies to represent the interests of blacks in their home regions, many delegates from North Carolina's interior had chosen to attend the convention on their own initiative. At the motion of James Harris of Raleigh, the congress declared itself a "mass convention" open to all delegates who arrived in good faith. The interior delegates and the convention as a whole tended to seek a conciliatory posture towards white society. Among various resolutions adopted by the body was one to establish a committee to draft a letter to the state constitutional convention representing the freedmen's views on equality. Randolph was made a member of the committee. The letter assumed a conservative and deferential tone and focused on appeals for economic relief, making only a vague appeal for the undoing of discriminatory legislation and omitting mentions of suffrage or full legal equality. The delegates' last act was to declare themselves a new North Carolina Equal Rights League headquartered in Raleigh, supplanting the original one created a year prior in New Bern.

On October 2, 1866, the North Carolina Equal Rights League opened its convention at the Loyal African Methodist Episcopal Church in Raleigh. Randolph was elected to serve as a delegate but was unable to attend. In lieu of his attendance, he wrote a letter to the convention, urging the delegates to discuss "political rights" and to remember that "these are peculiar times in which we live, and in all your counsel and deliberations, show yourselves 'as harmless as doves, but as wise as serpents' to the end that we all may be benefitted." The convention elected him to serve as the North Carolina Equal Rights League's corresponding secretary.

Randolph served as a registrar for the 1867 election concerning the state's upcoming constitutional convention. He was a founding member of the Reliance Bucket and Axe Company, a volunteer black firefighting company in New Bern, in 1868. He attended a convention in Raleigh to discuss black education matters in 1877. In 1878, Randolph became a charter member of New Bern's Ebenezer Presbyterian Church, a new black congregation, while his father became a church elder. By 1880, he had received a patronage appointment as a U.S. mail agent, owing to his support for Republican congressional candidates.

== Death ==
Randolph died on November 22, 1890 at his home in New Bern. A funeral was held for him at Ebenezer Presbyterian Church and he was interred at the city's Greenwood Cemetery.

== Works cited ==
- Alexander, Roberta Sue (1985). North Carolina Faces the Freedmen : Race Relations During Presidential Reconstruction 1865–67. Durham: Duke University Press. ISBN 0-8223-0628-X.
- Bishir, Catherine W. (2013). Crafting Lives : African American Artisans in New Bern, North Carolina, 1770-1900. Chapel Hill: The University of North Carolina Press. ISBN 9781469608761.
- Brigham, Mary (May 2001). "Ebenzer Presbyterian Church" (PDF). Journal of the New Bern Historical Society. XIV (1): 34–39.
- Cecelski, David (2012). The Fire of Freedom: Abraham Galloway and the Slaves' Civil War. Chapel Hill: University of North Carolina. ISBN 978-1-4696-2190-6.
- Houston, Claudia B. (2018). "History of the New Bern Fire Department History Part II: Post Civil War" (PDF). Journal of the New Bern Historical Society. XXV (1): 3–14.
- Watson, Alan D. (1987). A History of New Bern and Craven County. New Bern: Tryon Palace Commission. OCLC 17398679.
