= Clinton D. Pierson =

Clinton D. Pierson (died January 13, 1870) was an American politician and businessman. Reared enslaved, he was emancipated during the American Civil War and became a leading political advocate of the interests of freedmen in New Bern, North Carolina. After the war, he became active in the Equal Rights League and joined the Republican Party. He served as a delegate at North Carolina's 1868 constitutional convention.

== Early life ==
Pierson grew up enslaved. He later described the terms of his enslavement as relatively lax, saying that his master was "such only in name" and that he traveled freely and had subscriptions to the Congressional Globe and the New-York Tribune. He worked as a carpenter and a barber. Following Burnside's North Carolina Expedition and the recapture of areas in eastern North Carolina by federal forces during the American Civil War, Pierson was emancipated. He expanded his trade work to become a farmer and invested in a local grocery operation and a cotton gin.

== Career ==
On April 29, 1864, Pierson was part of a delegation of six black leaders—the others being Edward H. Hill, John R. Good, Abraham Galloway, and Isaac K. Felton of New Bern and Jarvis M. Williams of Washington, North Carolina—who met with U.S. President Abraham Lincoln at the White House in Washington, D.C.. According to historian David Cecelski, while Lincoln had met with black leaders from the North earlier in the war, "This seems to have been his first meeting with African American leaders from the South." The delegation entered the White House through the front door—a courtesy the men were unfamiliar with—and had a polite and frank discussion with the president about the political future of black freedmen. They then presented a petition on behalf of black North Carolinians, asking that blacks be guaranteed full political equality at the conclusion of the war. Afterwards, the men walked to the U.S. Capitol and distributed copies of their petition to U.S. Congressmen. Following the visit to Washington, Good, Galloway, Pierson, and Hill went on a tour of Northern states to promote support for black suffrage. On May 4, they addressed the congregation of Zion Church in New York City.

Meanwhile, preparations were made in Syracuse, New York to host a "National Convention of Colored Men" in October. Mass meetings were held in New Bern's black community to assemble a delegation. Pierson, Good, and John Randolph Jr. were chosen to represent the city, though the mass meetings exposed a rift between local black leaders and James Walker Hood, an AME Zion missionary who had been dispatched from the North to aid the city. Over the course of the summer the city was battered by a regional yellow fever epidemic and heavy federal conscription of black labor caused unrest and community divisions. Feeling it prudent to provide the black community with a sense of reconciliation, Good, Pierson, and Randolph resigned their mandate and joined with others in a mass meeting in electing Galloway to serve as the city's delegate.

Pierson was involved in local Equal Rights League activities and attended its state convention in Raleigh in October 1866, serving on its credentials committee. He joined the Republican Party.

In 1867, Pierson was made a registrar for the election of delegates to North Carolina's upcoming constitutional convention. Pierson was subsequently elected to represent Craven County at the convention, which met from January to March, 1868. He served on the body's Committee on Punishments and Penal Institutions. He voted in favor of making judges elective and proposed that the State Insane Asylum be opened to patients of all races.

== Later life ==
In 1869, Pierson cofounded the Newbern Co-operative Land and Building Association. He died on January 13, 1870.

== Works cited ==
- Bernstein, Leonard (October 1949). "The Participation of Negro Delegates in the Constitutional Convention of 1868 in North Carolina". The Journal of Negro History. 34 (4): 391–409. doi:10.2307/2715607. JSTOR 2715607.
- Bishir, Catherine W. (2013). Crafting Lives : African American Artisans in New Bern, North Carolina, 1770-1900. Chapel Hill: The University of North Carolina Press. ISBN 9781469608761.
- Cecelski, David (2012). The Fire of Freedom: Abraham Galloway and the Slaves' Civil War. Chapel Hill: University of North Carolina. ISBN 978-1-4696-2190-6.
- Watson, Alan D. (1987). A History of New Bern and Craven County. New Bern: Tryon Palace Commission. OCLC 17398679.
