= North Carolina Freedom Park =

Coordinates: 35.7835°N 78.6374°W

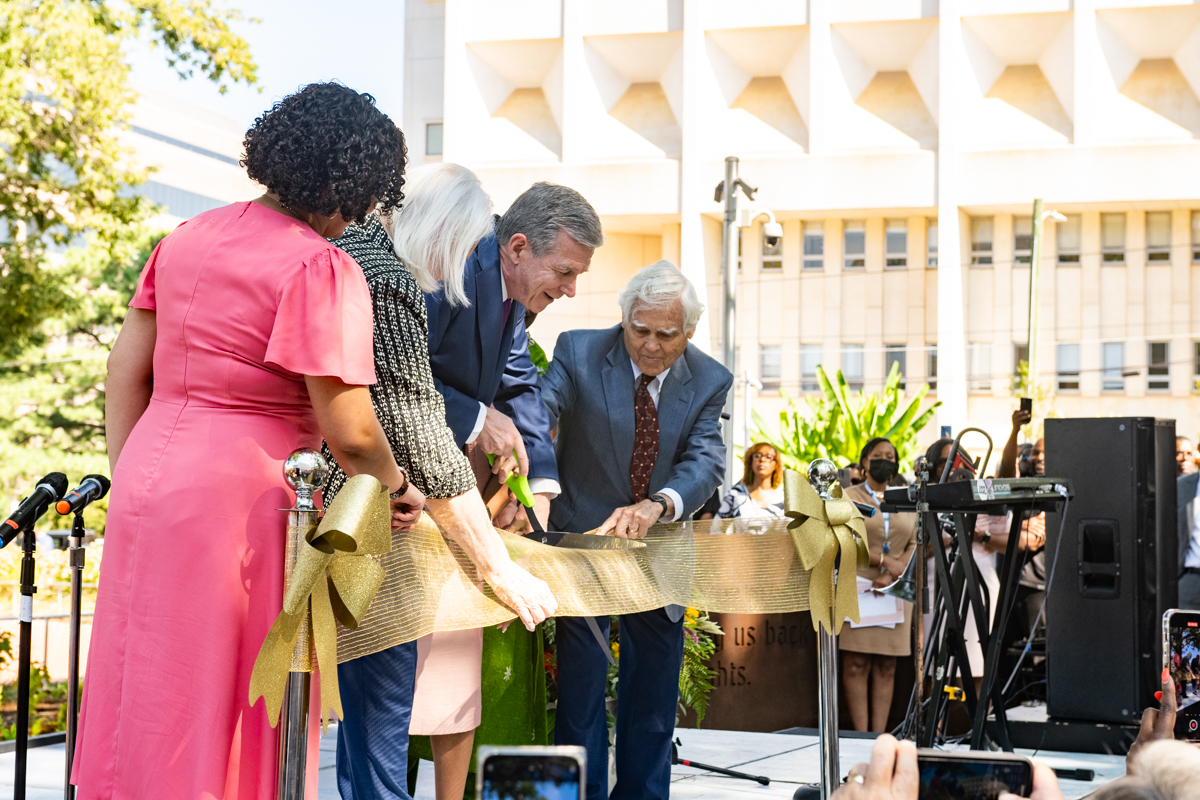
Freedom Park ribbon-cutting ceremony, August 23, 2023

North Carolina Freedom Park in Raleigh, North Carolina is a park on Lane Street downtown between the Executive Mansion and the Legislative Building. Designed by Phil Freelon and the firm Perkins + Will, who helped design the Smithsonian National Museum of African American History & Culture, It opened August 23, 2023. The Park was Constructed by Holt Brothers Construction of Raleigh, North Carolina which was founded by Torry Holt and Terrence Holt.

The park includes the North Carolina Victim Assistance Network’s Crime Victims’ Memorial Garden, which was already in the location. The total project cost of $5 million was funded partly from a Andrew W. Mellon Foundation grant of $1.9 million.

== History ==
The North Carolina Historical Commission approved the design on October 30, 2019.

The state bought the site in the 1960s and used half of it for parking, green space and a memorial to crime victims. Gavin Hogg, a lawyer from Scotland, bought 4 acres in 1831 for $400. On that site, which now includes the State Archives and Records Center, Thomas Devereux Hogg, who owned 18 slaves according to the 1850 census, built a house in 1850. It is not known whether the slaves lived on the site, but researchers in 2021 were attempting to determine whether they did and what happened to them after Emancipation. Researchers are also looking for evidence of the house that was on the site and possibly an earlier house.

On October 7, 2020, a groundbreaking was held for the Beacon of Freedom, a 50-foot-tall orange metal art work to be lighted at night. At that time, $3.2 million had been raised, and the North Carolina General Assembly approved $1.5 million in funding on June 26, 2020. The completed sculpture was delivered from Denver, Colorado in September 2022. Perkins + Will landscape architect Allen Pratt said pathways and low walls with inspirational quotations would serve as a "journey to the Beacon". The quotations are intended to inspire people to research the history behind them. The monument features quotes by George Floyd, Pauli Murray, Harriet Jacobs, Abraham Galloway, Lyda Moore Merrick, John Hope Franklin, Robert Hamilton, David Walker, John W. Pratt, Anna Julia Cooper, James Walker Hood, James E. Shepard, Charlotte Hawkins Brown, Golden A. Frinks, John H. Wheeler, Ella Baker, Julius L. Chambers, Maya Angelou, Phil Freelon and Paul Green.
