= Bertha Des Verney =

American pianist, composer, music educator, singer and playwright (1890–1975)

- Bertha Des Verney, from a 1942 publication.
- Born: Bertha Wheeler; October 5, 1890; Dallas, Texas
- Died: January 1, 1975 (aged 84); New York City
- Other names: Bertha Desverney, Bertha DesVerney
- Occupations: pianist, choir and drama director, music educator, composer
- Known for: over forty years as music director at Mother African Methodist Episcopal Zion Church

Bertha Des Verney (October 5, 1890 – January 1, 1975) was an American pianist, composer, music educator, singer, and playwright. She was choir and drama director at the Mother African Methodist Episcopal Zion Church in Harlem for over forty years, director of the Washington Music School in Albany, New York, and organized the Ministers of Music and Drama League. She was active in the National Association of Negro Musicians.

== Early life ==
Bertha Wheeler was born in Dallas, Texas, the daughter of Sam Wheeler and Sarah J. Spence Wheeler (later Sarah J. Whitaker). Her mother was a music teacher. As a child she won a gold medal for singing at the State Fair of Texas. She trained as a teacher at Prairie View State Normal and Industrial College, and studied music at the A. Smythe Music Conservatory in Oak Cliff, Texas. In New York after 1912, she took further classes, at the City College of New York, and the New York School of Social Work Administration.

== Career ==
Bertha Des Verney (her married surname is sometimes written as Desverney or DesVerney) was choir director at Mother AME Zion Church in Harlem for over forty years, director of the Washington Music School in Albany, New York, and organized the Ministers of Music and Drama League. She also taught music classes at the Utopia Children's House. She was active in the New York Charity Bureau, the Volunteer Club, and the Women's Professional and Business Club. Her students gave musical performances on the Chautauqua platform and on radio programs. She also wrote and produced concerts and historical pageants for church fundraisers, including "Great Women of the World Speak" (1958). She was active in the National Association of Negro Musicians.

She was a jubilee singer in the original Broadway production of Show Boat in 1929. She wrote a spiritual, "De Ole Sheep Done Know de Road" (1956), and longer works including The Life of Harriet Tubman (1965) and Elastic Fingers (1970). In 1959, there was a reception honoring Bertha Des Verney, "one of Harlem's most versatile citizens", with Marian Anderson, Philippa Schuyler, and Leigh Whipper among the notable presenters.

== Personal life ==
Bertha Wheeler married fellow musician Broughum C. Des Verney in 1915, in New York; they divorced in 1929. Her mother Sarah J. Whitaker was living in New York by 1930. Bertha Des Verney died in 1975, aged 84 years, in New York City. Her papers are archived in the New York Public Library.
