= Blake; or the Huts of America =

1859–1862 novel by Martin Delany

Blake; or The Huts of America: A Tale of the Mississippi Valley, the Southern United States, and Cuba
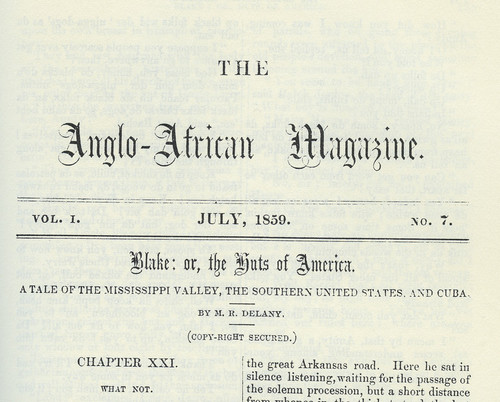
- Issue of The Anglo-African Magazine featuring the serialized novel
- Author: Martin Delany
- Language: English
- Genre: Alternate history, proto-science fiction
- Publisher: Anglo-African Magazine, Weekly Anglo-African Magazine, Beacon Press
- Publication date: 1859, 1861-62
- Publication place: United States
- Media type: Print

Blake; or The Huts of America: A Tale of the Mississippi Valley, the Southern United States, and Cuba is a novel by Martin Delany, initially published in two parts: The first in 1859 by The Anglo-African, and the second, during the earlier part of the American Civil War, in 1861–62 by the Weekly Anglo-African Magazine. The serial novel was left incomplete due to the fact that “there are no extant copies of the May 1862 issues, which probably contain the final chapters.” A book version, edited by Floyd Miller, was published by Beacon Press in 1970, and later a corrected edition, edited by Jerome McGann, was published by Harvard University Press of Cambridge, Massachusetts in 2017.

Katy L. Chiles described the novel as chronicling various permeations of a diasporic, Black nation-state, exemplified by the transnational odyssey of its protagonist, Henry Blake, through the American South, Canada, and Cuba. She has also stated that Delany's writing takes an anthropological approach in the ways it highlights Black American southern dialect, national identity, and geography through Blake's interviews of enslaved persons located on the plantations passed through along his insurrectional journey.

== Plot ==
=== Part 1 ===
The story begins on the Franks Plantation in Natchez, Mississippi. Maggie, the illegitimate daughter of Colonel Stephen Franks and wife to Henry Blake, is sold off—a decision determined by both her relationship with Mistress Franks and rejection of Colonel Franks's sexual overtures. Henry, a slave to Colonel Franks and husband to Maggie, is galvanized into action when informed of this tragic incident. Despite the religious pleas from Maggie's parents, Henry embarks on a subversive mission through the antebellum south.

Through exposition, it is revealed that Henry was not born into slavery but free in the West Indies to well-off tobacco planters. Blake's fortune takes a drastic turn when he conflates a slave vessel with that of a battleship and is consequently kidnapped to America and sold to Colonel Franks. Henry meets Maggie on the Franks Plantation; they soon marry and start a family.

On his revolutionary quest through plantations in the antebellum south, Henry interviews the enslaved persons he meets, documenting their experiences and circumstances; and procuring information about interviewees' participation in major U.S events such as the American Revolutionary War as well as organized anti-slavery, insurrectional stratagems. Successfully avoiding the ploys of slave catchers, Blake is able to spread his vision of radical revolt amongst the enslaved individuals he meets, eventually guiding a group of escapees to Canada.

=== Part 2 ===
Set in Cuba, Part two of Blake; or The Huts of America chronicles Henry's successful retrieval of his wife Maggie as well as his encountering an estranged cousin, Placido (after the Cuban poet Gabriel de la Concepción Valdés), and his joining a slave vessel headed to continental Africa with the hopes of leading an uprising on its return to Cuba, which is not successful. Instead, those Africans brought back to Cuba support Blake and Placido's establishment of the Oppressed Men and Women of Cuba: a secret society designed to eliminate Spanish colonial powers off the island.

The serial novel is cut short shortly thereafter this point due to a lack of existent copies of the Weekly Anglo-African Magazine for May 1862, which is believed to have concluded the novel. In a 2017 corrected edition of the novel editor and historian Jerome McGann wrote an ending for the novel based on the 1843 events in La Escalera. In this ending, many of those involved in the fictional uprising are captured and killed, while a few others are speculated to return to continental Africa.

== Publication and editing ==
Part 1, or chapters 1–23, Blake was published by the Anglo African Magazine in 1859. Due to Delany's travel and scholarship abroad in both West Africa and Britain, installments ceased until the Weekly Anglo-African continued publication of 24 additional chapters in 1862; The final six chapters of Delany's work are believed by scholars to have been in the May issues of the WAA, but there are no existing copies of them to date. Floyd Miller edited and collated the existing chapters from the work's earlier publications into a Book version. This version was published in by Beacon Press of Boston, Massachusetts in 1970. Jerome McGann edited and produced a corrected edition that was published by Harvard University Press of Cambridge, Massachusetts in 2017.

== Contemporary response ==
Delany's novel was largely left alone in the years following its last serial installment in the Weekly Anglo-African (1862). It was not until 1940, roughly 80 years after its last serial installment, that attention to Blake began to surface. This newfound curiosity for Blake continued to grow in the 50s and 60s, partially informed by its ideological influence on the types of Black revolutionary thought seen in the Black Power and Pan-Africanism Movements. Following the release of the book version of Blake; or The Huts of America, published by Beacon Press (Boston 1970) and edited by Floyd Miller, there began a surge of scholarship dedicated to Delany's work and Delany himself as well as on the Anglo African Magazine (AAM) and the Weekly Anglo-African (WAA). However, due to the various textual errors and under-developed historical and contextual insights found in Miller's edition, some of that resulting scholarship has been said to be often informed by misunderstandings of the work. In 1998, novelist Samuel R. Delany (no relation) praised Blake as a strong example "of what is often referred to as proto-science fiction...about as close to an sf-style alternate history novel as you can get."

McGann's corrected edition of the novel in 2017 (Cambridge 2017) has been credited as having ushered in a new wave of continued scholarly debate regarding various thematic dimensions of Delany's work, some of which include: intratextuality, emigration, transatlantic revolution and collective authorship.
