= Varick =

Varick may refer to:

== Places ==
- Varick, New York
- Varick Street

== People ==
- Varick, a prominent Dutch family in the colony of New York
- James Varick (1750–1827), freed slave of the Varicks, American bishop
- Richard Varick (1753–1831), American revolutionary and politician

== Other uses ==
- Varick Enterprises, a strongarm collection agency for the public loading racket on the piers, run by Eddie McGrath and George Daggert, enforced by McGrath's brother-in-law John M. Dunn, and employing Robert Barney Baker as a collector
