= James Varick =

American African Methodist bishop (1750–1827)

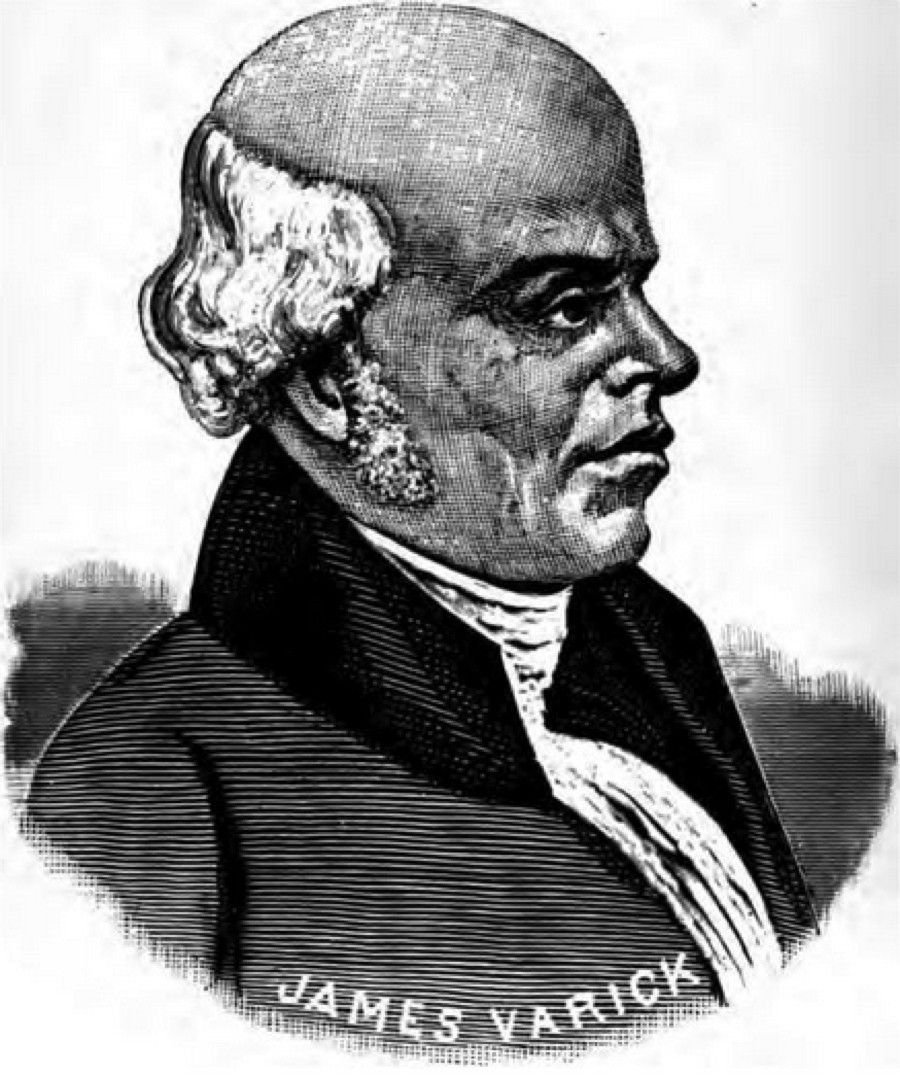
James Varick

James Varick (January 10, 1750 – July 27, 1827) was the first Bishop of the African Methodist Episcopal Zion Church.

== Biography ==
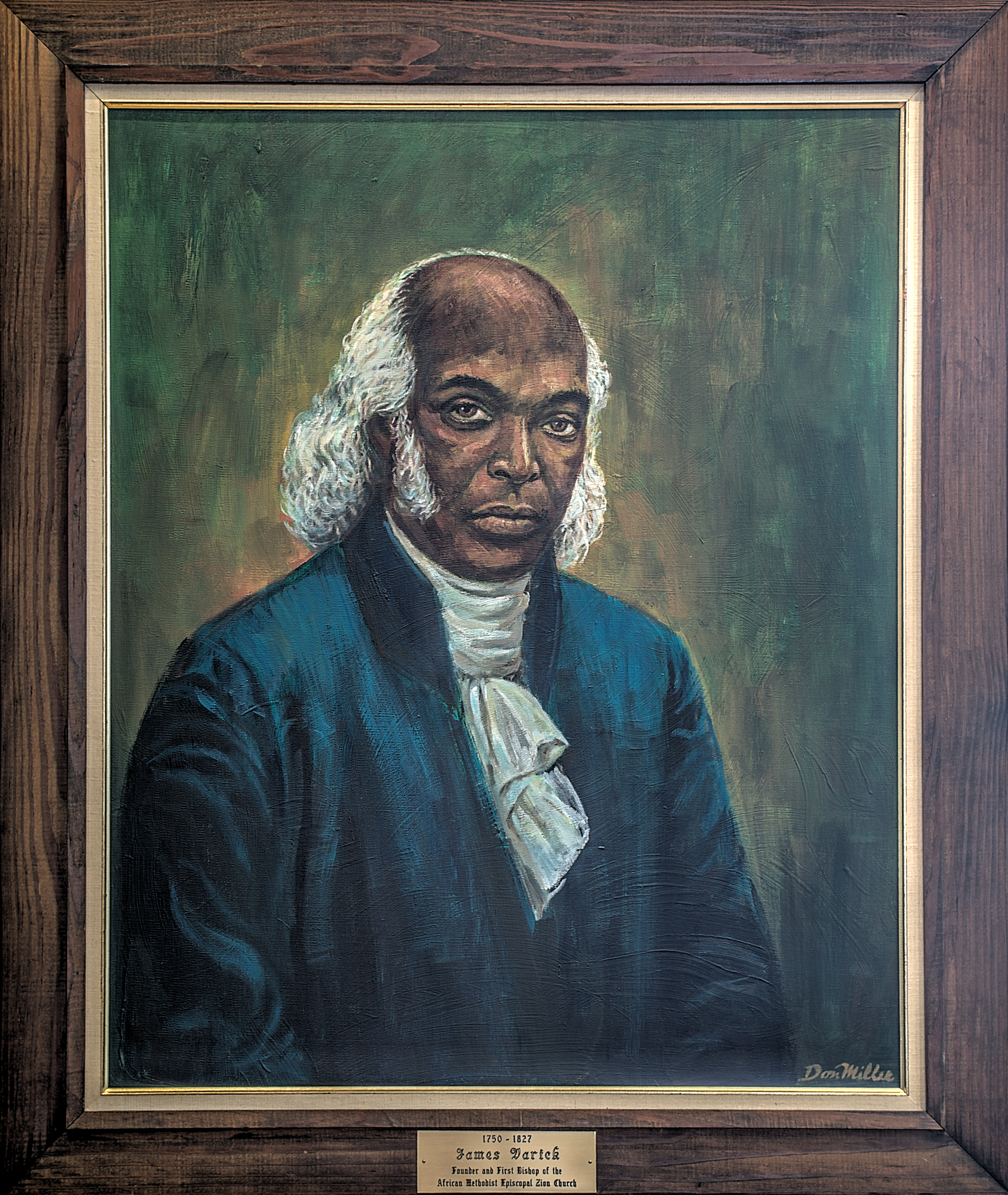
Painting of Varick on display at the World Methodist Museum, Lake Junaluska, NC

James Varick was born near Newburgh, New York, on January 10, 1750. His mother was possibly a slave of the Varicks, or Van Varicks. His father, Richard Varick, was born in Hackensack, New Jersey, where he was baptized in the Dutch Church. The family lived in New York City while James Varick was young, where he acquired an elementary education in New York schools. For many years, he worked as a shoemaker and later as a tobacco cutter to support himself and his family, because the church with which he was associated did not pay its preachers. About 1790, he married Aurelia Jones. The couple had four sons and three daughters.

The important events in Varick's life were associated with his religious avocation. Varick joined the John Street Methodist Church in New York City at an early date, possibly in 1766, the year after the church held its first meeting. Varick seems to have been licensed to preach by this group although he does not appear among the licensed preachers of the early Zion church listed by Christopher Rush, the second supervisor or bishop, in his 1844 history of the denomination. As early as 1780, black members of the John Street Church were holding separate class and prayer meetings. In 1796, Varick was among those black leaders who established separate meetings on a firmer footing.

The group met for prayer on Sunday afternoons and heard preachers and exhorters on Wednesday evenings in a house in Cross Street, which they remodeled to hold these meetings. In 1799, the group decided to erect a building and form a separate church. They dedicated the African Methodist Episcopal Zion Church, a wooden building at the corner of Church and Leonard Streets, in October 1800. The name of the mother church, Zion, was officially added to the denomination's name in 1848. In March 1801 the church was formally incorporated under New York law. This incorporation placed the church and its property firmly under the control of the trustees, who were required to be of African descent.

Since the church had preachers but no ordained minister, white ministers preached on Sunday afternoons and Wednesday evenings and supplied a morning communion service on the second Sunday of every month. The church thrived. It acquired a burial ground in 1807 and laid plans to buy the lots it had leased, along with another adjacent one, and to erect a new brick church to replace the original building. In 1820, as Zion was engaged in erecting its new church, the congregation was scattered across a number of temporary meeting places, a competing black denomination appeared in Richard Allen's African Methodist Episcopal Church, that was trying to build a national organization from its Philadelphia base.

After the Allenites were rebuffed by Zion, they organized their own New York church on Mott Street. Not all Zion members were estranged from the Allenites. Varick opened a meeting for Allen during the Mott Street dedication ceremonies. Further negotiations between the denominations failed, creating ongoing bitterness to both. After this, Varick reappeared in a leadership role in the Zion church.

In Rush's account, the trustees met at Varick's house in July 1820 and decided to pursue the ordination of black ministers, allowing Zion to dispense with white ministers. Varick must have been coming to the fore in church affairs earlier than this, but his name does not appear on early documents. A general meeting of the church on August 11, 1820 resulted in two decisions: a refusal to join Allen and a refusal to return to white control. The problem of elders for the separate church now became crucial. On September 13, 1820, Abraham Thompson and James Varick were selected by the congregation to become elders and they began to act immediately, holding communion services. A book of discipline for the new church was ready for printing by November 1. The denomination acquired churches outside of New York City, but its growth did not match that of Richard Allen's group.

At the first convention of the new denomination in June 1821, Varick was appointed district chairman, an interim supervisory position for the whole denomination. Finally, on June 17, 1822, white Methodist elders ordained Abraham Thompson, James Varick, and Leven Smith. James Varick officially became supervisor of the church on July 30, 1822, and was reelected again in 1824. (The title bishop was not adopted until later). In addition to his purely ministerial duties, Varick ran a school, first in his home and then in the church building. He was the first chaplain of the New York African Society for Mutual Relief (1810) and a vice-president of the African Bible Society (1817).

In 1821, he was a member of the group of Blacks who petitioned the state constitutional convention for the right to vote. He supported the establishment of Freedom's Journal, the first American black newspaper, in 1827. On July 4, 1827, the thanksgiving service for the final abolition of slavery in New York was held in Zion church. On July 22 Varick died at his home. Originally he was buried in the Colored Union Cemetery (now Woodlawn). His remains now repose in the crypt of the Mother African Methodist Episcopal Zion Church in Harlem.
