= Calvin J. Cowles =

Calvin Josiah Cowles
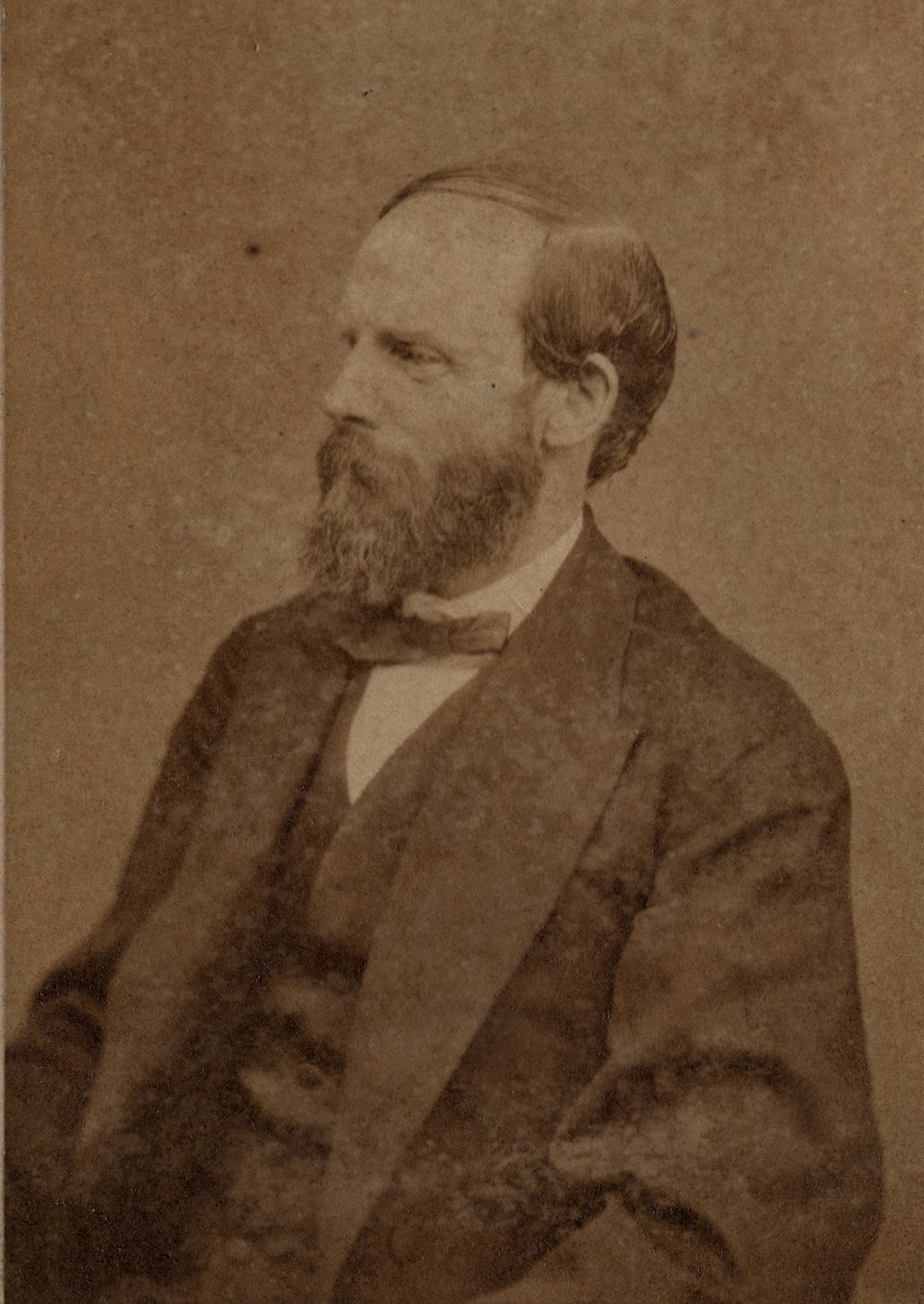
- Cowles in 1867
- Born: January 6, 1821; Hamptonville, North Carolina, U.S.
- Died: April 1, 1907 (aged 86); Wilkesboro, North Carolina, U.S.
- Occupations: Merchant, politician
- Known for: Medicinal plants trade in Southern Appalachians; President of North Carolina's 1868 constitutional convention; Superintendent, U.S. Assay Office Charlotte
- Political party: Republican
- Spouse(s): Martha Duvall (m. 1844; d. 1866); Ida Holden (m. 1868)
- Children: 5

Calvin Josiah Cowles (January 6, 1821 – April 1, 1907) was an American merchant and politician. Born in Hamptonville, North Carolina, he was educated in local schools. In 1846, at the behest of his father, he established a general store in Elkville, a community at the edge of the Blue Ridge Mountains. Initially trading in skins and furs, Cowles rapidly expanded his business into medicinal plants, which he sourced from local customers and storekeepers and shipped to drug manufacturers in the North and Midwest. He moved his store to Wilkesboro in 1858 and remained in operation there until 1869. He also took an interest in land speculation and mining, acquiring vast acreages in North Carolina and other states, and devoted significant energy towards the development of a mine in Ashe County.

Like his father, Cowles was initially active in Whig politics. He served as a U.S. postmaster in Elkville and Wilkesboro and remained a Unionist during the American Civil War. During the Reconstruction era, he supported the creation of the North Carolina Republican Party and presided over the state's 1868 constitutional convention. Through his political connections, Cowles was appointed superintendent of the U.S. Assay Office in Charlotte in January 1869. He resigned in 1885 and returned to Wilkesboro to focus on his land investments. He also compiled reports on local weather and agricultural affairs and harvested and sent specimens to the U.S. Department of Agriculture. He died following an illness in 1907.

== Early life ==
Calvin Josiah Cowles was born on January 6, 1821, in Hamptonville, North Carolina to Deborah Sanford and Josiah Cowles. The couple moved to the community from Connecticut in 1815. Josiah Cowles was a successful merchant and tinsmith. An active member of the Whig Party, he at times chaired the Surry County court and served on the governor's council during the tenure of William Alexander Graham. Following the birth of two other children, Sanford died in 1827. Josiah Cowles married Nancy Carson Duvall in 1828 and she brought three of her own children into the family.

Calvin Cowles was educated in local schools in Hamptonville and acquired further education through home study and business pursuits. He married his stepsister, Martha Duvall, on September 19, 1844. They had seven children together before Martha died on April 3, 1866.

== Business career ==
=== General merchandise and plants business ===
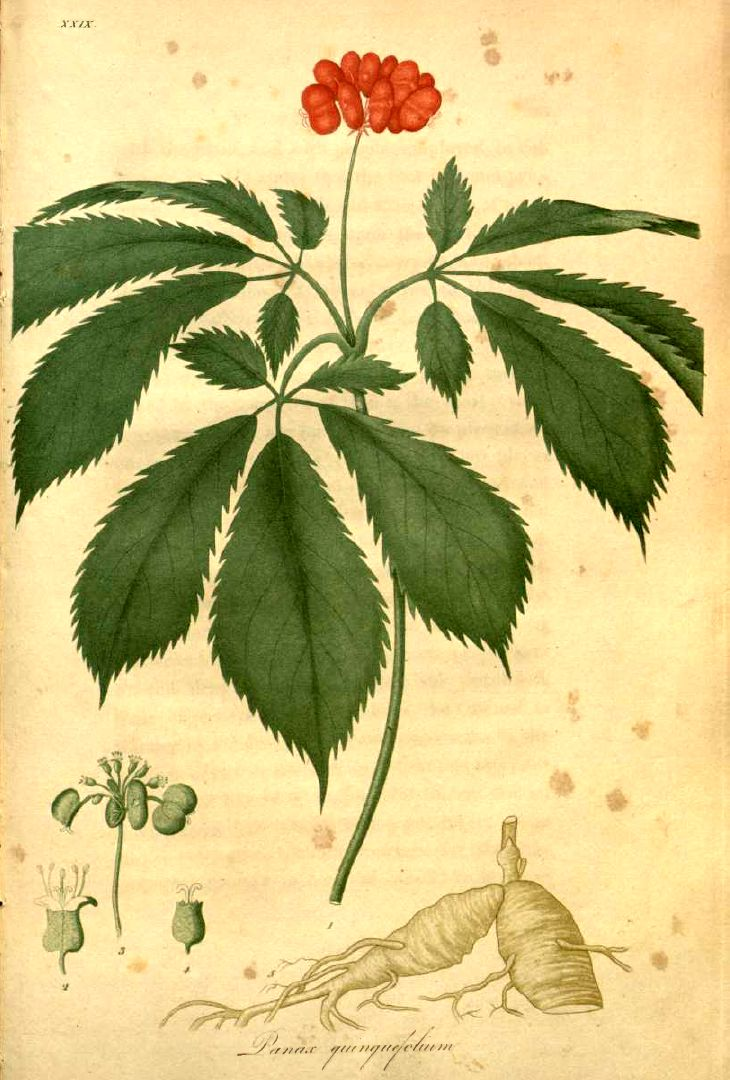
Cowles developed a medicinal plants trade which included ginseng (depicted).

In 1846, Cowles was dispatched by his father to establish a branch of the family general store businesses in Elkville, a community at the edge of the Blue Ridge Mountains. Much of his early trading activities concerned skins and furs and various other naturally-sourced goods local residents would use to barter with him for his store's merchandise. By the following year, he was trading ginseng and snakeroot. He sold small amounts of plants to local physicians for medicinal purposes but made little money doing so.

In 1849, against his father's wishes, Cowles decided to purchase large amounts of flowers, seeds, roots, and bark from local collectors and market them to pharmaceutical interests in the American Northeast as national interest in the botanical drug trade grew. To further his business, he curated knowledge in botany and medicine and read the American Journal of Pharmacy . Explaining the advantage of the biodiversity of the Southern Appalachian mountains to a potential customer, Cowles wrote, "Our locality is in the Mountains midst a profusion of plants heretofore unexplored." In 1850, he and his brother took a wagon to the North to sell botanicals and acquire other merchandise for resale. They passed through Washington D. C., Philadelphia, New York City, before selling out their cargo to the Shaker Society in New Lebanon, New York. He would continue to take annual trips to Northern cities to trade locally-sourced goods to merchants there and acquire items to sell in his store.

Cowles initially struggled in his efforts to engage with the national pharmaceutical market owing to the volatility of botanical prices and difficulties in shipping plants across vast distances, but his prospects improved as largescale producers of plant-based drugs emerged in the mid-19th century and became major buyers of his merchandise. While Cowles would sometimes barter with local customers at his store in Elkville who came bearing roots and herbs, by the late 1850s he had developed a regular system of sourcing medicinal plants from rural stores further west in the Blue Ridge Mountains. During the spring season he would supply storekeepers with posters listing the plants for which he knew commercial demand existed. Locals would use plants they had gathered to barter with the storekeepers for their wares, and once or twice a year the storekeepers would send a wagon full of botanicals to Cowles in exchange for boxed goods. He would then pack the plants into bales and ship them to customers via wagon, boat, and railroad. Cowles expanded his trade to the Midwest and Europe, selling over 11,000 pounds of plant products to St. Louis druggist William S. Merrell between 1854 and 1857 and exporting over 3,000 pounds of roots, seeds, and bark to London between 1852 and 1853. He also sold thousands of pounds of plants to five different Shaker communities, in Ohio, New York, and New Hampshire for medicinal use. Historian Luke Manget calculated that between 1850 and 1860, Cowles sold approximately 150,000 pounds of botanicals to 30 different American buyers. Selling 85 different species of plants, his major products were bloodroot, lobelia, lady's slipper, mayapple, and wild ginger. Ginseng destined for export to China yielded the highest profit. Over half of Cowles' business in the 1850s went to the Shakers and Tilden & Company.

In 1858, Cowles moved his family to Wilkesboro and opened a new store. The outbreak of the American Civil War in 1861 caused him great economic consternation and severed his trade with Northern plant buyers. To acquire drugs and supplies for its war effort, the government of the secessionist Confederate States of America established a series of medical purveyor depots across the South. Cowles quickly sought out orders from the purveyors in Charlotte and Goldsboro and began making steady shipments to them in 1862. His trade with the Confederate officials never reached the volume of his antebellum business with private buyers and was occasionally fraught with disputes over payment. In March 1863, Confederate Surgeon General Samuel P. Moore wrote to inform him that no more botanicals were needed and that the chief purveyor of the Goldsboro depot had resigned. Cowles thereafter discontinued his business with the Confederacy, though through the war he continued to sell goods to customers in Charleston, New Orleans, and Mobile.

By the time of the collapse of the Confederacy in 1865, Cowles was low on money and supplies, writing to a contemporary that "our business is torn up badly but still have vitality enough left to do a small business". He reconnected with some of his antebellum Northern buyers and, after scrounging together stock from the region, was able to make small shipments by the end of the year. Cowles' plant business was thus slowly reestablished and he garnered a few new customers, but in the aftermath of the war he became increasingly drawn into politics and other economic pursuits. In 1868, he erected a store and plant warehouse in Ashe County, then the largest structure in the county, and gave his son Arthur charge over it. By then, other regional merchants and companies had begun participating in the botanical drug trade. One contemporary later credited Cowles with developing a plant business model which was adopted by others. Cowles closed his own store in Wilkesboro in 1869. Overharvesting and related ecological impacts led to the decline of Cowles' plant business in the 1870s, with Arthur reporting in 1878 that their enterprise had "failed within the past year owing to roots and herbs becoming almost exterminated."

=== Land speculation and the Gap Creek Mine ===
While storekeeping in Elkville, Cowles developed an interest in mining and engaged in land speculation, buying up real estate from bankruptcies and land warrants. He also corresponded with miners and the North Carolina state geologist and studied mining textbooks. He sent mineral samples and Native American artifacts to the Exhibition of the Industry of All Nations in 1853. By 1861, by his own account, Cowles owned 6,000 acres in Wilkes and adjoining counties including four farms, 1,100 acres in Kansas, and 400 acres in Missouri. Sources disagree on his status as a slaveholder; according to historian Luke Manget, Cowles did own slaves, while historian Steven Nash wrote that no record of him owning slaves exists. Real estate comprised the largest surviving portion of his wealth at the end of the Civil War.

In 1854, Cowles and four other men secured an option to purchase a mine at Gap Creek in Ashe County. With Cowles paying half the purchase price, they acquired the property in 1856. He gradually bought out the other partners until he became the sole owner of the property in 1866. He had the mine inspected several times and, following the Civil War, searched for an investor to supply him with the capital necessary to exploit it.

In 1879, Cowles’ efforts attracted the attention of New York investor William C. Brandeth. Cowles agree to lease the mine to a company Brandeth established, the Copper Knob Mining Company. Brandeth and two other New York investors served as the company officers. Cowles received one third of the company's shares at a value of $100,000 and was made a director. While initially optimistic about the enterprise, his opinion soured as he expressed disapproval of the equipment ordered to exploit the mine and, at the first shareholder meeting in New York in June 1880, was surprised by an action of the board to issue more shares, thus diminishing his influence in the company. His son Josiah urged him to sell his shares over the subsequent months, warning in letters that management was poor and that the copper vein was exhausted. Records indicate that the mine was only in production for the year 1880. Following a drop in stock price, Brandeth reorganized the Copper Knob Mining Company and merged it with several others to form the North State Mining Company. The new company's share price dropped dramatically in January 1882. In January 1883 the Gap Creek Mine operation was reorganized as the Rich Knob Copper Company. By 1889 the company had failed.

Following his return to Wilkesboro in 1885, Cowles devoted most of his professional energies towards his land investments. He sold off most of his land in western states in 1905.

== Political career ==
Like his father, Cowles was initially active in Whig politics. He served as U.S. postmaster in Elkville from 1852 to 1858. He subsequently became a postmaster in Wilkesboro. During the Civil War, he became an active supporter of North Carolina's "peace movement", led by newspaper editor William Woods Holden. An avowed Unionist, he opposed the secession of the Confederate States and refused to make an oath in loyalty to it, causing him to lose his Confederate postmastership in 1863. He was not drafted into the Confederate military due to a chronic leg infection. As he was publicly known for his Unionist bona fides, he was able to convince federal troops to not sabotage local facilities during Stoneman's 1865 raid. Following the war, Cowles was pardoned for his service to the Confederate government by U.S. President Andrew Johnson in 1865.

The North Carolina General Assembly elected Cowles to serve on the governor's council during the tenure of Provisional Governor Holden in 1865. He subsequently advised the provisional governor on his appointments of new officials in Western county governments. He also served as a delegate at the state's 1865 constitutional convention. In 1867, Holden and John Pool assembled a committee to further the Unionist cause in North Carolina. Among its members was Cowles. At the direction of the committee, a circular was printed and invitations sent out to organize a state convention to prepare for the state's full readmission into the Union. On March 27, the convention met in the North Carolina State Capitol and founded the North Carolina Republican Party.

"We break up this circle to return to wives, children and friends, bearing in our hands the charter of their liberties — a Constitution guaranteeing liberty, ensuring justice, and conferring the means to knowledge on all, the high as well as the lowly man."

— Cowles' remarks at the closing session of the 1868 constitutional convention

Pursuant to the federal Reconstruction Acts, military authorities ordered North Carolina to organize elections for delegates to a new constitutional convention in November 1867. A Republican convention in Taylorsville nominated Cowles as a candidate for the seat representing Wilkes County, which he won. The convention convened at the North Carolina State Capitol in Raleigh on January 14, 1868. Later that day, the Republican delegates held a caucus and, after a few ballots, voted to unanimously nominate Cowles for the convention presidency. The following day the convention elected its officers. Cowles was elected president over Plato Durham by a vote of 100 to nine.

On January 16, Cowles appointed a 16-member committee to consider "the best method of proceeding to form a Constitution." The following day, the convention adopted a permanent rules of order and approved a plan offered by the 16-member committee to have 13 different issues of constitutional concern drafted out by different 13-member committees. Cowles announced his appointments to the committees on January 20. During the day session on March 12, Cowles ordered the sergeant-at-arms to detain delegate Albion W. Tourgée for violating the rules of order, though his action was countermanded by a vote of the convention. Following the convention, Cowles lingered in Raleigh to ensure the constitution was printed and brought a copy of the document to Washington D.C., where he made final typographical corrections and presented it to the U.S. Congress and President Johnson.

Cowles married Ida Holden, daughter of Governor Holden, on July 23, 1868.

Through his political connections, Cowles was appointed superintendent of the U.S. Assay Office in Charlotte by President Ulysses S. Grant in January 1869. He campaigned without success for the facility to be restored to its former status as a U.S. Mint, writing to federal officials, Congressmen, and newspaper editors. He resigned his appointment in October 1885 after the onset of the Cleveland Administration and handed it over to his successor on November 6. He returned to Wilkesboro in December.

Cowles campaigned and gave speeches on behalf of the Republican Party in Wilkes County during the state elections of 1896.

== Later life and death ==
After returning to Wilkesboro in 1885, Cowles nurtured several hobbies, including collecting weather and agronomical data and forwarding it to state and federal agencies. He also collected specimens and sent them to the U.S. Department of Agriculture for identification. Cowles also began writing a family genealogical history which was finished and published by one of his sons posthumously.

In about 1904, Cowles fell and dislocated his hip, losing the ability to walk. In 1907 he grew ill, dying on April 1, 1907. A funeral was held at his home before his body was brought to Charlotte, where a second funeral was held. According to his last wishes, Cowles was buried in Elmwood Cemetery alongside three of his late children. According to environmental historian Luke Manget, "available sources suggest that Cowles was probably the first to link Blue Ridge medicinal plants to national drug markets."

Cowles retained a significant number of records and written correspondence by the time of his death. His collected papers were divided and are housed by the State Archives of North Carolina and the Southern Historical Collection at the University of North Carolina at Chapel Hill. A specimen of Ustilago zeae collected by Cowles was divided in 1921 and is held at the University of North Carolina Herbarium, Cornell University, the New York Botanical Garden, the U.S. National Fungus Collections, and the University of Arizona. A specimen of Leucothoe fontanesiana harvested by him is held at the University of Nebraska.

== Works cited ==
- Beckel, Deborah (2010). Radical Reform: Interracial Politics in Post-Emancipation North Carolina. University of Virginia Press. ISBN 978-0-8139-3052-7.
- Blosser, Susan Sokol (October 1974). "Calvin J. Cowles's Gap Creek Mine: A Case Study of Mine Speculation in the Gilded Age". The North Carolina Historical Review. 51 (4): 379–400. JSTOR 23529882.
- Cheney, John L. Jr., ed. (1981). North Carolina Government, 1585-1979: A Narrative and Statistical History (revised ed.). Raleigh: North Carolina Secretary of State. OCLC 1290270510.
- Cowles, Calvin Duvall, ed. (1929). Genealogy of the Cowles Families in America. New Haven: The Tuttle, Morehouse, & Taylor Company.
- Fordney, Ben Fuller (2010). George Stoneman : A Biography of the Union General. Jefferson: McFarland. ISBN 978-0-7864-8346-4.
- Hayes, Johnson J. (1962). The Land of Wilkes. Wilkesboro: Wilkes County Historical Society. OCLC 3586318.
- Manget, Luke (2022). Ginseng Diggers : A History of Root and Herb Gathering in Appalachia (ebook ed.). Lexington: The University Press of Kentucky. ISBN 978-0-8131-8383-1.
- Manget, Luke (October 2016). "Nature's Emporium: The Botanical Drug Trade and the Commons Tradition in Southern Appalachia, 1847–1917". Environmental History. 21 (4): 660–687. JSTOR 44132038.
- Nash, Steven E. (2016). Reconstruction's Ragged Edge: The Politics of Postwar Life in the Southern Mountains. Chapel Hill: The University of North Carolina Press. ISBN 978-1-4696-2624-6.
- Raper, Horace W. (1985). William W. Holden: North Carolina's Political Enigma. Chapel Hill: University of North Carolina Press. ISBN 978-0-8078-5060-2.
