= Mother African Methodist Episcopal Zion Church =

Church in Manhattan, New York

Coordinates: 40.8160°N 73.9418°W

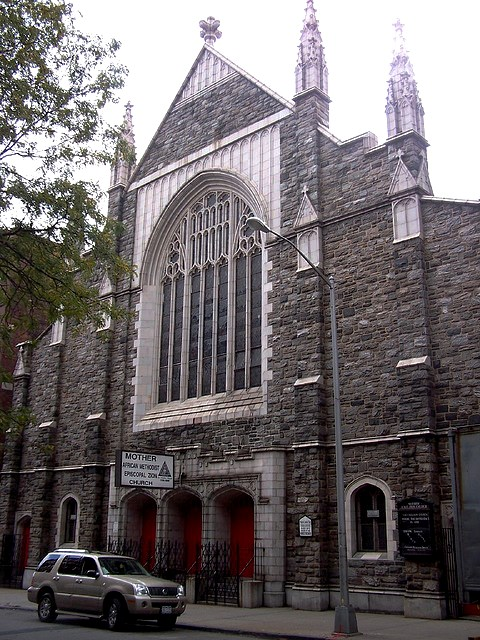
The Mother African Methodist Episcopal Zion Church in New York City is a New York City Landmark

The Mother African Methodist Episcopal Zion Church, also known as "Mother Zion", located at 140–148 West 137th Street between Adam Clayton Powell Jr. Boulevard and Lenox Avenue in the Harlem neighborhood of Manhattan, New York City, is the oldest African-American church in New York City, and the "mother church" of the African Methodist Episcopal Zion conference. The church was designated a New York City Landmark on July 13, 1993.

== Building ==
The building was constructed between 1923 and 1925 and was designed by architect George W. Foster Jr., one of the first registered African-American architects in the United States. It is neo-Gothic in style, with a "simple facade", similar to several other Protestant churches built in Manhattan during the late 19th century and early 20th century. The sanctuary has an "auditorium" layout, of a type that was becoming popular with Protestant congregations at the time, rather than a "cross" form of layout, which has a deep chancel for the altar, and a long nave intersected by two transepts. The seating is arranged in a wide arc around the altar and pulpit, and features a wide balcony on the second level, also in an arc layout. Seating capacity inside the church is about 1000.

The building is the sixth to house the congregation.

== History ==
The Mother A.M.E. Zion congregation was formed in 1796 by African-American members of the predominantly white John Street Methodist Church. Although that church was abolitionist in its orientation, racial segregation was still enforced in other ways. As one A.M.E. Zion historian described it:

The colored members were not permitted to come to the sacrament (Holy Communion) until all the white members, even children, had communed.

The founding bishop who led the congregation was James Varick, whose tomb is located underneath the current building's sanctuary. The original congregation numbered about 100 members, who met in a rented hall. The congregation met at several other locations in Manhattan – including at Church and Leonard Street, Bleecker Street and 127 West 89th Street – before moving to 151 West 136th Street in Harlem in 1914, and then settling at the present location.

The A.M.E. Zion conference was referred to nationally as the "Freedom Church" for its vital role in the United States abolitionist movement, and was an Underground Railroad refuge. Sojourner Truth was a member of the congregation, and spoke out from the pulpit against slavery. Harriet Tubman and Frederick Douglass were members of the A.M.E. Zion conference at other congregations. Mother Zion's identification with the abolitionist movement led to it being attacked by an anti-black mob during the three-day anti-abolitionist riot in 1834. Windows were smashed at Mother Zion, and several black and white churches were set ablaze. The July 12, 1834 New York Evening Post newspaper denounced the attacks as a "disgrace".

Mother Zion also became an important cultural center for the city's African-American community. Paul Robeson, brother of Pastor Dr. Benjamin C. Robeson, spoke from the pulpit. Dr. Robeson's activism for civil rights led him to work with prominent Harlem Renaissance members such as Langston Hughes and W.E.B. Du Bois. From the 1920s into the 1960s, Bertha Des Verney was choir and drama director at the church, and produced concerts and historical pageants as fundraisers and community outreach.

Today, the Mother Zion church continues to sponsor a variety of social programs aimed at assisting members of the congregation and the surrounding community. Several historic artifacts from the church's 200-year history are on display in the vestibule.

== See also ==
- African Methodist Episcopal Zion Church
- James Varick
- Underground Railroad
- African-American church
- Harlem Renaissance
- List of New York City Designated Landmarks in Manhattan above 110th Street
