= The Anglo-African =

1859–1861 African American abolitionist newspaper and magazine

The Anglo-African and The Weekly Anglo-African
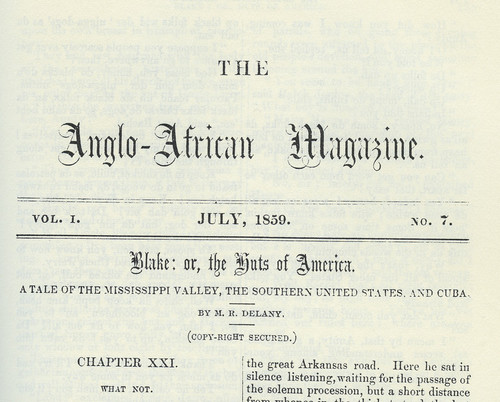
- Founder: Robert Hamilton, Thomas Hamilton
- Founded: 1859
- Final issue: December 1865
- Country: United States

The Anglo-African and The Weekly Anglo-African were periodicals published by African American abolitionist brothers Thomas Hamilton (1823–1865) and Robert Hamilton (1819–1870) in New York City during the American Civil War era. For a short period, one paper was also named the Pine and Palm.

== History ==
Thomas and Robert Hamilton were the sons of William Hamilton, abolitionist and founder of the New York African Society for Mutual Relief. The elder Hamilton lived through the 1834 anti-abolitionist riots in New York and was critical of pacifist abolitionist newspapers like The Liberator.

The two brothers held similar views, and they founded The Anglo-African Magazine, a monthly, in January 1859. It had 32 pages and cost one dollar for a yearly subscription. The Hamiltons founded the Weekly Anglo-African six months afterwards. The newspaper and magazine were the first publications to run Martin Delany's serialized novel, Blake; or the Huts of America. Robert managed the magazine, while Thomas used his expertise as a reporter and journalist. The weekly's contributors included Martin Delany, Mary Ann Shadd Cary, Edward Wilmot Blyden, and Sarah Mapps Douglass. William B. Gould also served as a financial backer and reporter for The Anglo-African. The newspaper ran with four pages of text at four cents per copy. Its motto was, "Man must be free; if not through the law, then above the law." The paper had early successes in its coverage of slavery resistance, the Dred Scott v. Sandford case, and the Raid on Harpers Ferry. Its correspondents and subscribers stretched across the US, as well as Canada and Jamaica.

The Anglo-African Magazine was published until March 1860 and the Weekly Anglo-African until March 1861. Due to financial troubles, the Hamiltons sold the weekly newspaper to George Lawrence, Jr., and James Redpath, who renamed it to The Pine and Palm. The Hamilton brothers quickly saw that, under its new owners, the newspaper would no longer serve the needs of the black community. Robert Hamilton, therefore, decided to start a new newspaper, also named the Weekly Anglo-African. Its first issue was published in July 1861.

A complete file of the paper is unavailable today.

== The Civil War ==
The publication extensively covered the lead-up, outbreak and goings-on of the war. One writer urged black people to prepare for any contingency, writing, in 1861:

"We are concerned with this fight and our fate hangs upon its issues. The South must be subjugated or we shall be enslaved. In aiding the Federal government in whatever way we can, we are aiding to secure our own liberty...We do not affirm that the North is fighting in behalf of the black man's rights as such -- if this was the single issue, we even doubt whether they would fight at all. But circumstances have been so arranged by the decrees of Providence, that in struggling for their own nationality they are forced to defend our rights...Let us be awake, therefore brethren; a generous emulation in a common patriotism, and a special call to defend our rights alike bid us to be on the alert to seize arms and drill as soon as the government shall be willing to accept our services."

== Legacy ==
Lost issues of the Weekly Anglo-African were uncovered in the Black Abolitionist Papers Project.

== Bibliography ==
- Gould IV, William B. (2002). Diary of a Contraband: The Civil War Passage of a Black Sailor (paperback ed.). Stanford University Press. ISBN 0-8047-4708-3.
- Fagan, Benjamin (2018). "Blake and the Black Newspaper". American Periodicals. 28 (1): 78–80.
- Jackson, Debra (2004). ""A Cultural Stronghold": The "Anglo-African" Newspaper and the Black Community of New York". New York History. 85 (4): 331–357. ISSN 0146-437X. JSTOR 23187347.
- Penn, I. Garland (Irvine Garland) (1891). The Afro-American press and its editors. Springfield, Mass.: Willey & co.
- "Just Teach One: Early African American Print » Weekly Anglo-African and The Pine and Palm (1861-1862)".
- Weir, Elizabeth Lorang and R. J. (September 27, 2013). "'The Slave to His Star'". Opinionator.
