= National Equal Rights League =

Oldest American organization dedicated to black liberation

Minutes of the first annual meeting, 1865

The National Equal Rights League (NERL) is the oldest nationwide human rights organization in the United States. It was founded in Syracuse, New York in 1864 dedicated to the liberation of black people in the United States. Its origins can be traced back to the emancipation of slaves in the British West Indies in 1833. The league emphasized moral reform and self-help, aiming "to encourage sound morality, education, temperance, frugality, industry, and promote everything that pertains to a well-ordered and dignified life." Black leaders formed state and local branches of the league which drew many members, which caused the society to grow quickly, in areas such as Harrisburg, Pennsylvania, where people such as Thomas Morris Chester joined.

== Organizational history ==
=== Creation ===
The National Convention of Colored Men opened in Syracuse, New York on October 4, 1864 with 144 delegates attending. On the third day of the convention, the chairman of the assembly's business committee, Henry Highland Garnet, issued a report detailing the creation of a national league "to encourage sound morality, education, temperance, frugality, industry, and promote every thing that pertains to a well-ordered and dignified life" and "to obtain by appeals to the minds and conscience of the American people, or by legal process when possible, a recognition of the rights of the colored people of the nation as American citizens."

The convention proceeded to spend much of its time debating the creation of the National Equal Rights League and created a charter for it which stipulated that every attending delegate would be considered a member of the new league. The following day, the delegates selected officers for the league. John Mercer Langston was elected national president, while a four-member executive board and 16 vice presidents were also selected. The convention then dissolved.

In November and December, a state league and several local auxiliaries were organized in Union-occupied eastern North Carolina, shortly followed by the creation of a state chapter and local groups in Louisiana. A Pennsylvania league was founded in Philadelphia by the end of the year. In January 1865, a Massachusetts state league was organized in Boston, and an Ohio chapter was begun the following month. By mid-March, state leagues were operating in Tennessee, Missouri, Michigan, and New York. The North Carolina state chapter was re-founded in October 1865.

=== Post-war activities ===
At the conclusion of the Civil War, the NERL national organization had few resources and consequently little influence over activities in the states of the former Confederacy. Drawing on the support mostly Northern black activists, the NERL struggled to garner quorums at its national board quarterly meetings through 1864 and 1865. Its first annual convention was held in Cleveland on September 19, 1865 and attended by 41 delegates. Of these, eight were from the South, and the vast majority of the rest came from Ohio and Pennsylvania. A second national convention was held in Washington D. C. in January 1867.

While the national organization of the NERL declined in influence, several of its local auxiliaries remained active, often operating under new names.

The NERL used the susu economics practices of its many West Indies immigrant members to fund its activities, which included the establishment of self-sufficient black communities (Black Wall Streets) throughout the U.S. The work of the membership of the NERL created such other organizations as the National Negro Business League, the National Negro Bar Association, and the Pan-African Conference.

The NERL also had significant international influence. Its leadership was received by heads of state, and they even had a delegate attend the Paris Peace Conference of 1919. The two best-known leaders of the organization were John Mercer Langston and William Monroe Trotter. Other notable members included Madam C. J. Walker, Ida B. Wells-Barnett (who founded its Anti-Lynching Bureau), Mary Church Terrell, Marcus Garvey, Octavius V. Catto, Charles Lewis Reason, John Rock, William Cooper Nell, Moses Dickson, and Frederick Douglass.

=== Formation of a rival organization ===
In 1905, NERL leaders met with other black leaders, in what is now known as the Niagara Movement, to discuss the growing debate between followers of Booker T. Washington and followers of W. E. B. Du Bois, who called for an end to discrimination, and to develop a new strategy for dealing with race relations at the turn of the 20th century. At this meeting, Du Bois unsuccessfully tried to convince the NERL members present, Trotter and Wells-Barnett, that white Americans should be permitted to join the NERL. When his pleas went unheeded, Du Bois left the organization and joined the National Association for the Advancement of Colored People.

From 1910 until roughly 1920, Byron Gunner served as the president of the NERL.

With the continued growth of the NAACP, the NERL lost prominence and by 1921 most members had joined the NAACP.

== Proceedings ==
- Proceedings of the First Annual Meeting of the National Equal Rights League Held in Cleveland, Ohio, October 19, 20, and 21, 1865

== See also ==
- Negro Sanhedrin
- National Independent Political League

== Works cited ==
- Cecelski, David (2012). The Fire of Freedom: Abraham Galloway and the Slaves' Civil War. Chapel Hill: University of North Carolina. ISBN 978-1-4696-2190-6.
