= W. T. J. Hayes =

American politician

W. T. J. Hayes, sometimes documented as H. T. J. Hayes, was a public official and state legislator in North Carolina. He served in the North Carolina House of Representatives in 1868 for Halifax County, North Carolina. He was a signatory of North Carolina's 1868 Constitution. He was a Republican.

He also served as a justice of the peace and coroner in Halifax County.

He served at the 1868 North Carolina Constitutional Convention with fellow African American delegates. He served on the convention's Committee on Militia and Committee on Education.

He served in the North Carolina House of Representatives with fellow representatives John H. Renfrow and Ivey Hutchings from Halifax County.

He was one of the first African Americans to serve in North Carolina's legislature (along with Henry C. Cherry, Parker D. Robbins, Wilson Cary, B. W. Morris, A. W. Stevens, John S. Leary, Isham Sweat, John H. Williamson, A. A. Crawford, Cuffie Mayo, Ivey Hutchings, John S. W. Eagles, George W. Price, Thomas A. Sykes, James H. Harris, William Cawthorn, Richard Falkner and three state senators).

== See also ==
- African American officeholders from the end of the Civil War until before 1900
- North Carolina General Assembly of 1868–1869

== Works cited ==
- Bernstein, Leonard (October 1949). "The Participation of Negro Delegates in the Constitutional Convention of 1868 in North Carolina". The Journal of Negro History. 34 (4): 391–409. JSTOR 2715607.
