= North Carolina General Assembly of 1868–1869 =

Legislative term in US state of North Carolina

78th North Carolina General Assembly (1868–1869)
←	1866-1867	1869–1870	→
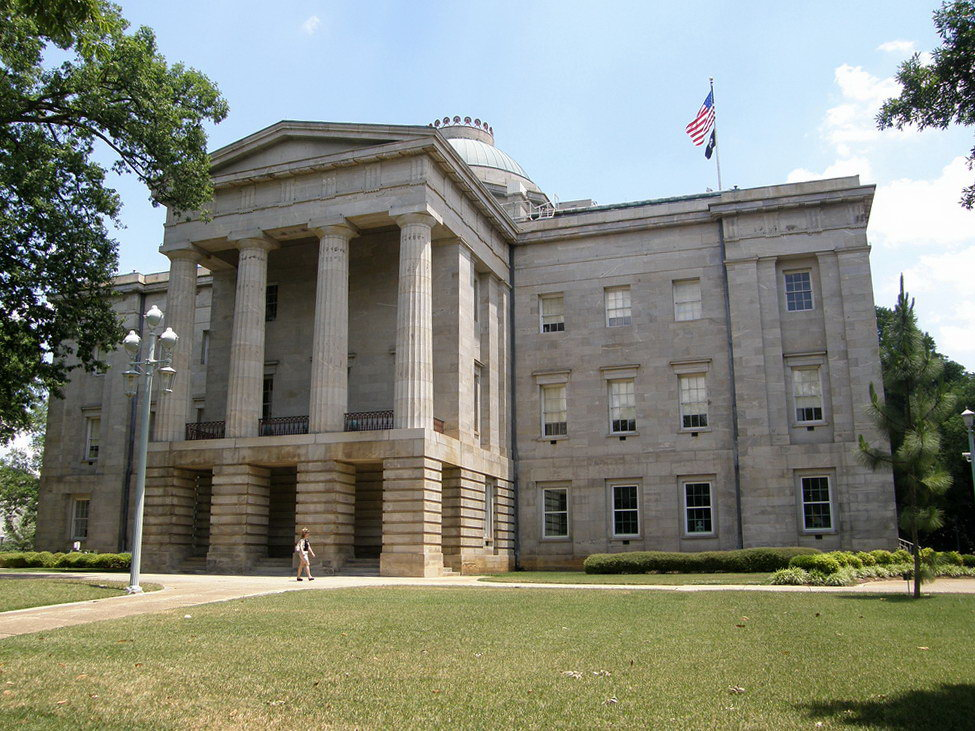
- North Carolina State Capitol

Overview
- Legislative body: North Carolina General Assembly
- Jurisdiction: North Carolina, United States
- Meeting place: Raleigh
- Term: 1868–1869

Senate
- Members: 43 Senators
- Lieutenant Governor/President of the Senate: Tod Robinson Caldwell
- President pro tem: Charles S. Winstead
- Clerk: T. A. Brynes
- Clerk pro tem: William M. Barrow
- Doorkeeper: J. T. Ball
- Party control: Republican

House of Representatives
- Members: 120 Delegates
- Speaker: Joseph W. Holden
- Speaker pro tem: Jacob W. Bowman
- Clerk: John H. Bonner
- Party control: Republican

Sessions
- 1st: November 16, 1868 – April 12, 1869
- 2nd: July 1, 1868 – August 24, 1868

The North Carolina General Assembly of 1868–1869 met in Raleigh from November 16, 1868, to April 12, 1869, with a special session from July 1, 1868, to August 24, 1868. This was the first assembly to meet after the approval of the new Constitution of North Carolina in 1868. As prescribed in this constitution, the assembly consisted of the 120 members in the North Carolina House of Representatives and 43 senators in the North Carolina Senate elected by the voters on August 6, 1868. This assembly was in control of the Republican Party and was dominated by reconstruction era politics.

== Changes in assembly from the North Carolina Constitution of 1868 ==
The Constitution of North Carolina was rewritten at the North Carolina Constitutional Convention of 1868, which met in Raleigh from January 14 to March 17, 1868. The House of Commons was renamed the House of Representatives. The new constitution spelled out that the legislature would convene annually on the third Monday in November. The number of senators was set as 50. There would be one or two senators for each district composed of one or more counties. The boundaries of the districts would be re-evaluated in 1871 after the federal census. A state census was required every 10 years, beginning in 1875. This census would be used to re-evaluate the districts, so that an approximate equal number of residents would be included in each district. The House of Representatives was set at 120 members. Each county would have at least one representative and some counties would have up to four representatives, based on population. The population would not include non-taxed Indians or aliens. Elections would be held the first Thursday of August. The terms of the members of the house and senate would commence when elected and continue till the next election.

The lieutenant governor was designated as the President of the Senate, albeit without a vote unless there was a tie vote. A president pro temp would be elected by the senators to serve in the absence of the lieutenant governor.

The 1868 Constitution included provisions to establish public education for the first time, prohibit slavery, and adopt universal suffrage. It also provided for public welfare institutions for the first time: orphanages, public charities and a penitentiary.

In January 1868, at the same time as the Constitutional Convention, a Black Caucus came together in Raleigh. Many of these members would be elected to the 1860 General Assembly.

In April 1868, voters of North Carolina ratified the new constitution.

== Legislation ==
This assembly met in regular session from November 16, 1868, to April 12, 1869. They met in an extra session from July 1, 1868, to August 24, 1868. The assembly ratified the Fourteenth Amendment to the United States Constitution, as required by the United States Congress, on July 4, 1868. Ratification of the Fourteenth amendment readmitted North Carolina to the United States. This assembly also ratified the Fifteenth Amendment. In anticipation of readmission to the U.S. Congress, on June 25, 1868, the assembly elected John Pool of Elizabeth City and Joseph Carter Abbott of Wilmington to the United States Senate. The state's first public school systems, one for blacks and one for whites, was created by this assembly. Funding for the first state penitentiary, Central Prison was authorized by this legislature.

Every Southern state subsidized railroads, which modernizers believed could haul the South out of isolation and poverty. Millions of dollars in bonds and subsidies were fraudulently pocketed. One ring in North Carolina spent $200,000 in bribing the legislature and obtained millions in state money for its railroads. Instead of building new track, however, it used the funds to speculate in bonds, reward friends with extravagant fees, and enjoy lavish trips to Europe.

For additional details on legislation, see Legislative Documents.

== Assembly membership ==
This was the first assembly that Blacks were represented in the assembly, including three Black senators and 18 representatives in the House of Representatives.

=== House of Representatives members ===
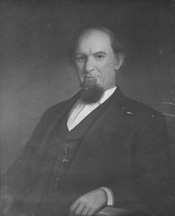
Rep. Thomas Jordan Jarvis, Tyrrell County

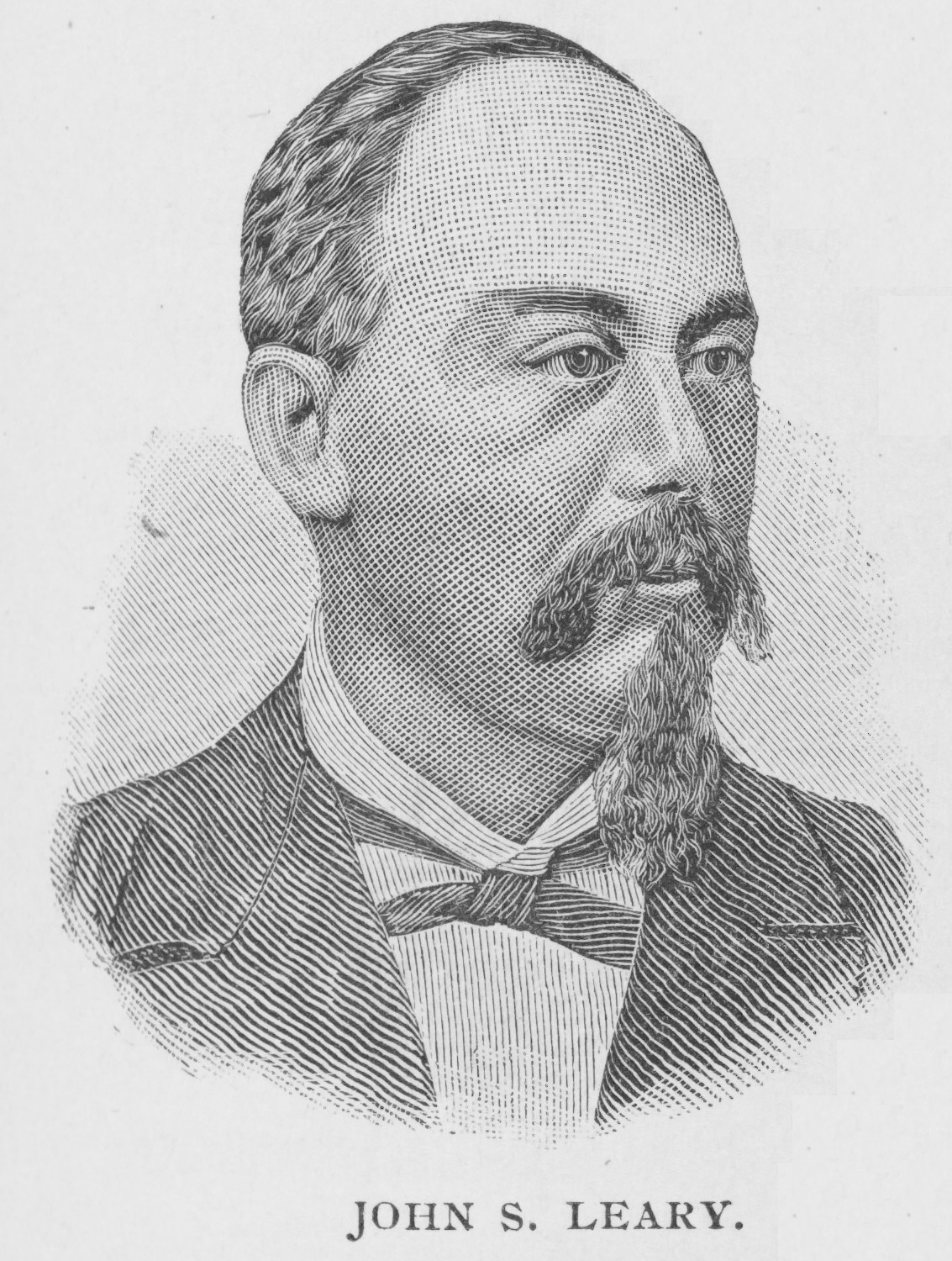
Rep. John S. Leary, Cumberland County

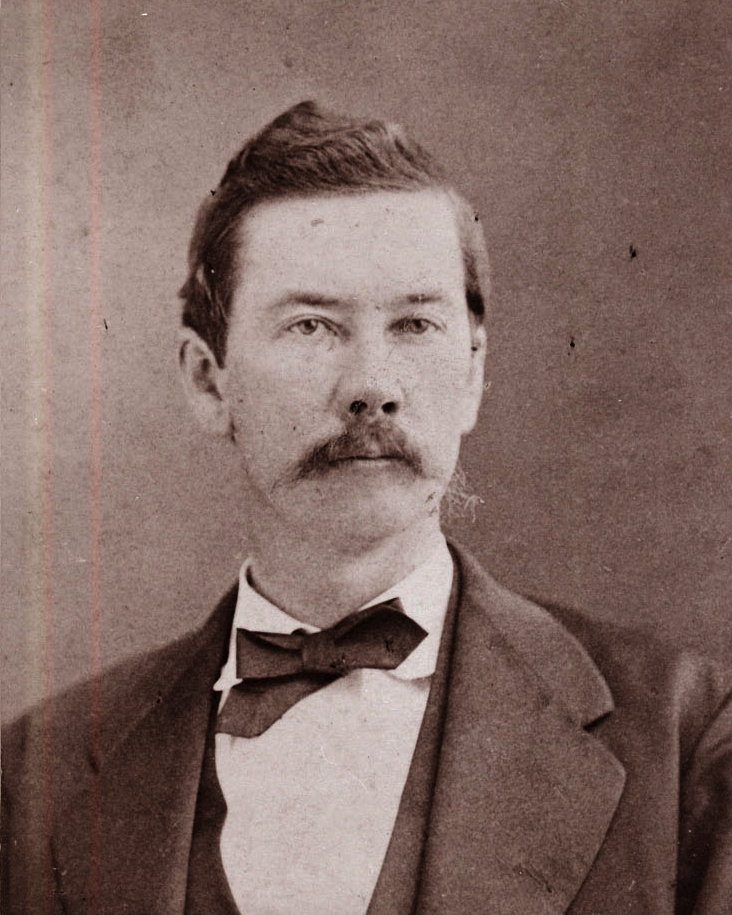
Rep. James L. Robinson, Macon County

The House of Representative delegates elected a speaker (Joseph W. Holden, William A. Moore), clerk, assistant clerk (John H. Boner), doorkeeper, and assistant doorkeeper. Alleghany, Clay, Mitchell, Polk, Transylvania, and Wilson counties sent delegates to the assembly for the first time. The following delegates to the House of Representatives were elected by the voters of North Carolina to represent each county and district:

County	No of County Delegates	Name
Alamance	1	John A. Moore
Alexander	1	Robert P. Matheson
Alleghany	1	John L. Smith
Anson	1	D. Ingram
Ashe	1	Matthew Carson
Beaufort	1	Hiram E. Stilley
Bertie	1	Parker David Robbins (Note: One of eighteen Black representatives and three senators elected to the General Assembly after the Civil War.)
Bladen	1	F. W. Foster
Brunswick	1	B. T. Morrell
Buncombe	1	William Gaston Candler
Burke	1	John R. Sudderth
Cabarrus	1	John P. Gibson
Caldwell	1	James C. Harper (Note: James C. Harper's election was declared illegal and voided.)
Caldwell	1	W. H. Malone (Note: W. H.Malone was elected to replace James C. Harper after his election was declared voided.)
Camden	1	W. B. Ferebee
Carteret	1	Joel Henry Davis
Caswell	2	William Long (Note: William Long's election was declared illegal and voided. He was replaced by Wilson Carey.)
Caswell	2	Wilson Carey (Note: Wilson Carey was elected to replace William Long.)
Caswell	2	Philip Hodnett
Catawba	1	James R. Ellis
Chatham	2	William T. Gunter
Chatham	2	James B. Long
Cherokee	1	J. R. Simonds
Chowan	1	William A. Moore
Clay	1	John O. Hicks
Cleveland	1	Plato Durham
Columbus	2	Daniel P. High
Craven	3	B.W. Morris
Craven	3	Augustus S. Seymour
Craven	3	A. W. Stevens
Cumberland	2	John S. Leary
Cumberland	2	Isham Sweat
Currituck	1	Thomas C. Humphries
Davidson	2	George Kinney
Davidson	2	Jabez Mendenhall
Davie	1	James A. Kelley
Duplin	2	N. E. Armstrong
Duplin	2	Isaac B. Kelly
Edgecombe	2	Henry C. Cherry
Edgecombe	2	George Peck
Forsyth	1	John P. Vest
Franklin	2	James T. Harris
Franklin	2	John H. Williamson
Gaston	1	Jonas Hoffman
Gates	1	John Gatling
Granville	3	A. A. Crawford
Granville	3	Cuffie Mayo
Granville	3	J. W. Ragland
Greene	1	Joseph Dixon
Guilford	2	David Hodgin
Guilford	2	Stephen G. Horney
Halifax	3	H. T. J. Hayes
Halifax	3	Ivey Hutchings
Halifax	3	John H. Renfrow
Harnett	1	Neill S. Stewart (Note: Neill S. Stewart's election was declared illegal and voided.)
Harnett	1	B. C. Williams (Note: B. C. Williams was elected to replace Neill S. Stewart.)
Haywood	1	Walter Brown (Note: Walter Brown's election was declared illegal and voided.)
Haywood	1	W. P. Welch
Henderson	1	W. D. Justus
Hertford	1	Thomas Snipes
Hyde	1	Tillman Farrow
Iredell	2	George Davidson
Iredell	2	T. A. Nicholson
Jackson	1	Joseph Keener (Note: Joseph Keener's election was declared illegal and voided.)
Jackson	1	E. M. Painter (Note: E. M. Painter was elected to replace Joseph Keener.)
Johnston	2	B. R. Hinnant
Johnston	2	Edward W. Pou
Jones	1	Lorenzo D. Wilkie
Lenoir	1	Wallace Ames
Lincoln	1	A. C. Wiswall
Macon	1	James L. Robinson
Madison	1	George W. Gahagan
Martin	1	Jesse J. Smith
McDowell	1	W. W. Gilbert
Mecklenburg	2	W. Grier
Mecklenburg	2	Robert D. Whitley
Mitchell	1	Jacob W. Bowman
Montgomery	1	George A. Graham
Moore	1	Abel Kelly
Nash	1	William W. Boddie
New Hanover	3	Joseph C. Abbott (Note: Joseph C. Abbott resigned his position after being elected to the U.S. Senate.)
New Hanover	3	George Z. French
New Hanover	3	Llewellyn Garrish Estes (Note: At some point in his tenure, Llewellen G. Estes resigned his position.)
New Hanover	3	R. C. Parker (Note: R. C. Parker died while in office.)
New Hanover	3	John S. W. Eagles
New Hanover	3	George W. Price
Northampton	2	Roswell C. Parker
Northampton	2	John T. Reynolds
Onslow	1	Franklin Thompson
Orange	2	J.J. Allison (Note: J. J. Allison resigned his position.)
Orange	2	Thomas M. Argo (Note: Thomas M. Argo was elected to replace J. J. Allison, who resigned his position.)
Orange	2	Frederick N. Strudwick
Pasquotank	1	Thomas A. Sykes
Perquimans	1	Jeptha White
Person	1	Samuel C. Barnett
Pitt	2	Byron Laflin
Pitt	2	Richard Short
Polk	1	Ashbury Waldrop
Randolph	2	Joel Ashworth
Randolph	2	E. T. Blair
Richmond	1	Richmond T. Long
Robeson	2	Edward K. Proctor
Robeson	2	James Sinclair
Rockingham	2	Henry Barnes
Rockingham	2	D. S. Ellington
Rowan	2	Joseph Hawkins
Rowan	2	Isaac M. Shaver
Rutherford	1	James M. Justice
Sampson	1	John C. Williams
Stanly	1	Lafayette Green
Stokes	1	W. W. McCanless
Surry	1	A. L. Hendricks
Transylvania	1	James W. Clayton
Tyrrell	1	Thomas Jordan Jarvis
Union	1	Hugh Downing
Wake	4	Joseph W. Holden
Wake	4	Stokes D. Franklin
Wake	4	Fielding G. Moring
Wake	4	James H. Harris
Warren	2	William Cawthorn
Warren	2	Richard Falkner
Washington	1	James J. Rea
Watauga	1	Lewis B. Banner
Wayne	2	John T. Person
Wayne	2	D. E. Smith
Wilkes	1	William B. Segrist
Wilson	1	George W. Stanton
Yadkin	1	J. M. Vestal
Yancey	1	David Proffitt

=== Senate members ===
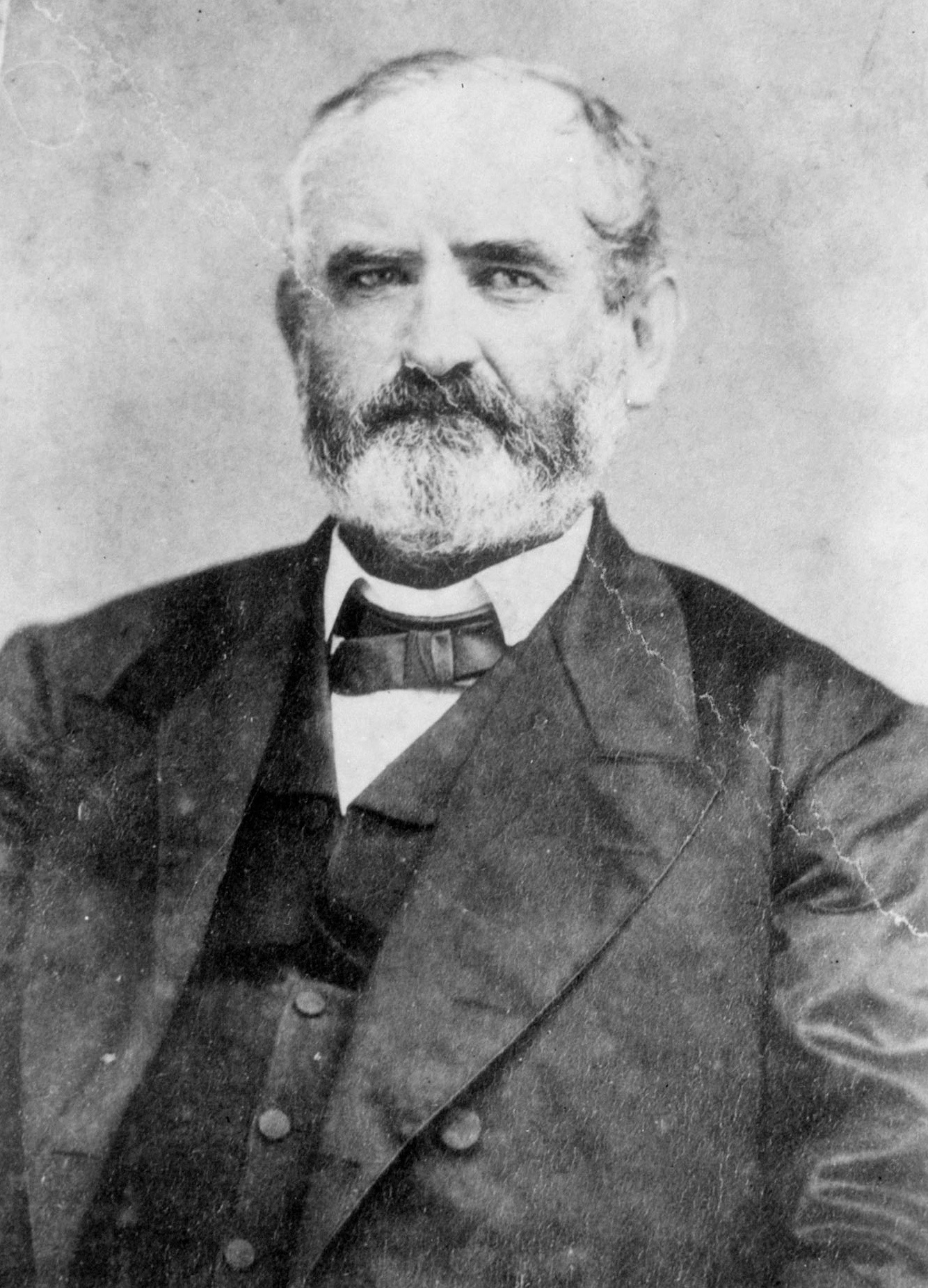
Lieutenant Governor Tod Robinson Caldwell

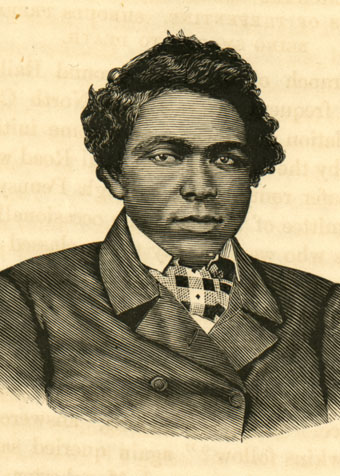
Sen. Abraham Galloway

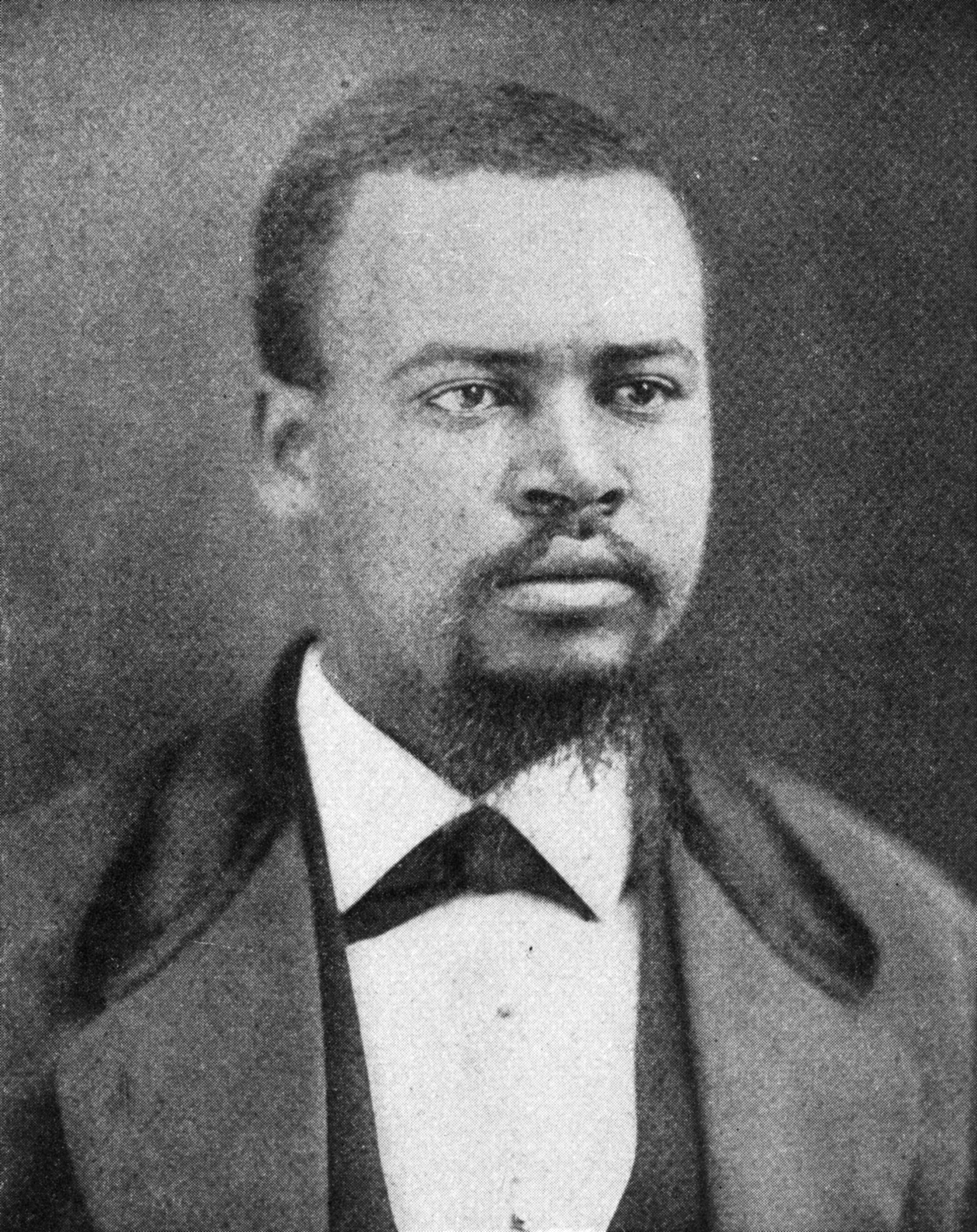
Sen. John Adams Hyman

The lieutenant governor, Tod Robinson Caldwell, served as president of the Senate when it was in session. The senators elected a president pro tem (Charles S. Winstead), clerk (T. A. Brynes), assistant clerk (William M. Barrow), doorkeeper (J. T. Ball), and assistant doorkeeper (Francis W. Gibble). The following senators were elected by the voters of North Carolina to represent the numbered districts:

District	Counties	Senator	Home County
1	Camden, Chowan, Currituck, Gates, Pasquotank, Perquimans	Elihu A. White	Perquimans
1	Camden, Chowan, Currituck, Gates, Pasquotank, Perquimans	Joseph W. Etheridge	Currituck
2	Martin, Tyrrell, Washington	Franklin G. Martindale	Martin
3	Beaufort, Hyde	J.B. Respess	Beaufort
4	Northampton	William Barrow	Northampton
5	Bertie, Hertford	James W. Beasley	Bertie
6	Halifax	Henry Eppes	Halifax
7	Edgecombe	N.B. Bellamy	Edgecombe
8	Pitt	W.A. Cherry	Pitt
9	Nash, Wilson	Joshua Barnes	Wilson
10	Carteret, Craven	W.A. Moore	Carteret
10	Carteret, Craven	W. H. S. Sweet	Craven
11	Jones, Lenoir	David D. Colgrove	Jones
12	Duplin, Onslow	William A. Allen	Duplin
13	Brunswick, New Hanover	Abraham H. Galloway	New Hanover
13	Brunswick, New Hanover	Edwin Legg	Brunswick
14	Bladen, Columbus	John W. Purdie	Bladen
15	Robeson	O. S. Hayes	Robeson
16	Cumberland, Harnett, Sampson	James S. Harrington	Harnett
16	Cumberland, Harnett, Sampson	L.D. Hall	Cumberland
17	Johnston	J.B. Cook	Johnston
18	Greene, Wayne	Curtis Hooks Brogden	Wayne
19	Franklin, Wake	R.I. Wynne	Wake
19	Franklin, Wake	Willie D. Jones	Wake
20	Warren	John Adams Hyman	Warren
21	Granville, Person	Charles S. Winstead	Person
21	Granville, Person	R.W. Lassiter	Granville
22	Orange	Josiah Turner, Jr.	Orange
23	Chatham	Silas Burns	Chatham
24	Caswell	Bedford Brown	Caswell
25	Rockingham	John M. Lindsay	Rockingham
26	Alamance, Guilford	G.W. Welker	Guilford
26	Alamance, Guilford	T.M. Shoffner	Alamance
27	Montgomery, Randolph	John H. Davis	Montgomery
28	Moore, Richmond	William B. Richardson	Moore
29	Anson, Union	P.T. Beeman	Anson
30	Mecklenburg	James W. Osborne	Mecklenburg
31	Cabarrus, Stanly	Christopher Melchor	Cabarrus
32	Davie, Rowan	W.M. Robbins	Rowan
33	Davidson	P.A. Long	Davidson
34	Forsyth, Stokes	Peter A. Wilson	Forsyth
35	Surry, Yadkin	Samuel Forkner	Surry
36	Alexander, Iredell	J.H. McLaughlin	Iredell
37	Catawba, Gaston, Lincoln	Lawson A. Mason	Gaston
38	Cleveland, Polk, Rutherford	J.B. Eaves	Rutherford
39	Alleghany, Ashe, Wilkes	Samuel P. Smith	Wilkes
40	Buncombe, Henderson, Transylvania	James Blythe	Henderson
41	Burke, Caldwell, Watauga	Edmund W. Jones	Caldwell
42	Madison, McDowell, Mitchell, Yancey	William M. Moore	Yancey
43	Cherokee, Clay, Haywood, Jackson, Macon	W. Levi Love	Macon

== See also ==
- List of North Carolina state legislatures
