= John Renfrow =

American politician

John Renfrow was an American politician and state legislator in North Carolina. He represented Halifax County in the North Carolina House of Representatives.

William Cicero Allen labeled him a carpetbagger. He served in the House with fellow Halifax representatives W. T. J. Hayes and Ivey Hutchings.
