= Joseph Carter Abbott =

American politician (1825–1881)

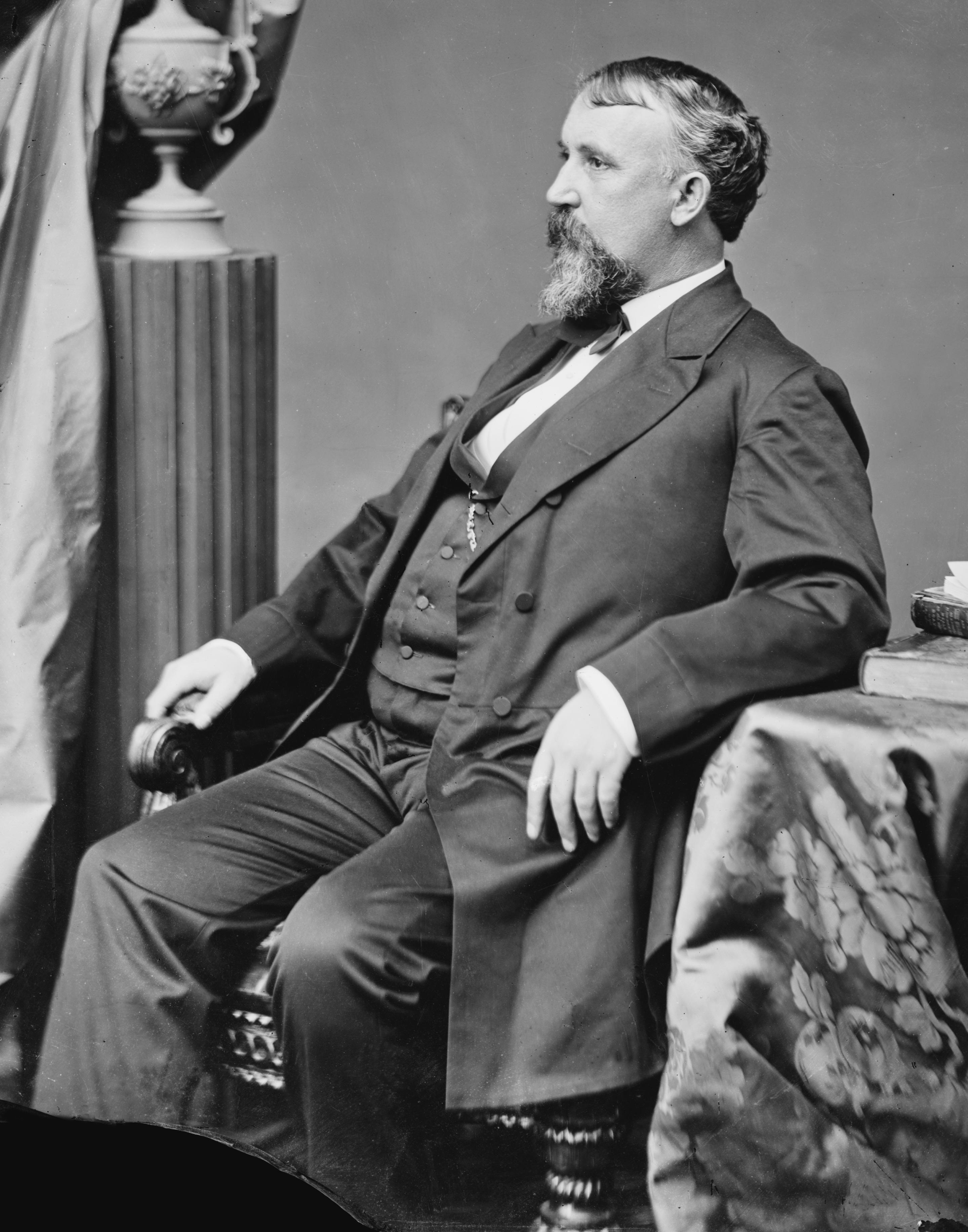

United States Senator from North Carolina
- In office July 14, 1868 – March 4, 1871
- Preceded by: Thomas Bragg
- Succeeded by: Matthew W. Ransom

Adjutant General of New Hampshire
- In office July 1855 – July 1861

Personal details
- Born: July 15, 1825 Concord, New Hampshire, U.S.
- Died: October 8, 1881 (aged 56) Wilmington, North Carolina, U.S.

Military service
- Allegiance: United States of America; Union
- Branch/service: United States Army; Union Army
- Years of service: 1861–1865
- Rank: Colonel; Bvt. Brigadier General
- Battles/wars: See list: American Civil War; Second Battle of Fort Wagner; Battle of Olustee; Bermuda Hundred campaign; Richmond-Petersburg campaign; Battle of Chaffin's Farm; Battle of Darbytown and New Market Roads; Wilmington campaigns; Second Battle of Fort Fisher; Battle of Wilmington

Joseph Carter Abbott (July 15, 1825 – October 8, 1881) was a Union Army colonel during the American Civil War who was awarded the grade of brevet brigadier general of volunteers and a Republican United States senator from the state of North Carolina between 1868 and 1871. During his career in private life he was a lawyer, newspaper editor and businessman. He also served as collector of the port of Wilmington, inspector of posts along the eastern line of the southern coast during the Rutherford B. Hayes Administration, and special agent of the United States Treasury Department.

== Early life ==
Abbott was born in Concord, New Hampshire on July 15, 1825, to farmer Aaron Carter Abbott and Nancy Badger. He attended public schools in Concord and attended Phillips Academy Andover, Massachusetts to prepare for college attendance, graduating in 1846. Instead of pursuing a college education, he read law in Concord and Manchester, and was admitted to the bar in 1853 and opened a practice in Concord. He married but his first wife died and he remarried.

In April 1851, Abbott became editor of the Manchester American. Six months later he became editor of the New Hampshire Statesman published at Concord. In May 1852, he moved to Manchester and became editor and owner of the Manchester American. He sold his interest in the newspaper in 1857. From May 1859 to May 1861, he served as an editor and part owner of the Boston Atlas and Bee.

Abbott was an active member of the Whig Party and supported its ideas of American nationalism and economic growth. He chaired the committee on resolutions at the party's state convention in 1852 and served on its state executive committee for two years. Following the collapse of the Whig Party, Abbott joined the Know Nothing Party, which later collapsed and was partly subsumed by the Republican Party. In July 1855, Abbott was appointed Adjutant General of New Hampshire. In 1857, he authored and successfully lobbied the passage of a bill which reorganized the state militia.

== Civil War ==
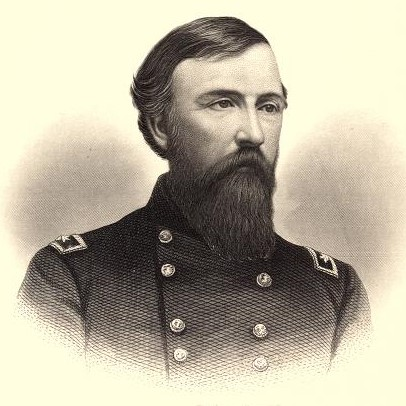
Abbott in U.S. Army uniform

Amidst a sectional crisis in the United States, South Carolina forces launched an attack on Fort Sumter in April 1861, beginning the American Civil War. In response, U.S. President Abraham Lincoln issued a proclamation calling for the states to raise their militias to suppress the fledging insurrection. Governor of New Hampshire Ichabod Goodwin ordered Abbott in his capacity as adjutant general to assemble 10 companies of volunteers from the state militia for federal service. Abbott shortly thereafter issued a general order, reiterating Lincoln's proclamation and Goodwin's request for troops. He then opened enlistment offices across New Hampshire and fielded reports from recruiting officers on their progress.

Abbott resigned his adjutant generalship in July and was dispatched to Washington D.C. to serve as a liaison between New Hampshire and the federal government. U.S. Secretary of War Simon Cameron authorized him to raise a federal regiment in New Hampshire on September 2. On October 2, Abbott became the lieutenant colonel of the fledging regiment and took charge of its mustering camp in Manchester. Insisting that an officer with formal military education be given charge of the unit, at his suggestion the governor commissioned Haldimand S. Putnam as colonel. Other officers were commissioned at Abbott's preference. Organization of the 7th New Hampshire Volunteer Infantry Regiment was completed on December 14.

Abbott participated in the battles of Port Royal Sound, St. John's Bluff, Fort Pulaski and Fort Wagner. In November 1863, he became colonel of the regiment and led it at the Battle of Olustee. He also led the 7th New Hampshire during the subsequent Bermuda Hundred Campaign in Virginia.

During the siege of Petersburg, he commanded the 2nd Brigade, 1st Division, X Corps at Chaffin's Farm and the subsequent actions along the Darbytown and New Market Roads. The Army of the James was then reorganized and his command became the 2nd Brigade, 2nd Division, XXIV Corps which was attached to the Fort Fisher Expeditionary Corps under Brigadier General Alfred Terry and participated in the second battle of Fort Fisher. During the battle, his brigade held a defensive line to protect the bulk of the expedition while it attacked the fort. His forces then participated in the capture of Wilmington. On January 25, 1865, President Abraham Lincoln nominated Abbott for appointment to the grade of brevet brigadier general of volunteers, to rank from January 15, 1865 for gallant services in the capture of Fort Fisher and the U.S. Senate confirmed the award on February 14, 1865. General John Schofield subsequently appointed him as "special agent" tasked with managing returned prisoners of war in the region.

Abbott was made commander of the Post of Wilmington on March 2, 1865 and held the city with four regiments, while other federal forces incurred further into North Carolina's interior. General Joseph R. Hawley was appointed commander of the District of Wilmington. Wilmington was shortly thereafter overwhelmed by sick former federal prisoners of war, refugees, and freed slaves. Hawley and Abbott thus focused their efforts on the developing humanitarian crisis and containing the spread of disease. He also temporarily barred the sale of alcoholic beverages to preserve public order. Abbott's wife joined him in Wilmington and assisted in relief efforts before she succumbed to typhoid fever in June 1865. Abbott, who was relieved of the command of the Post of Wilmington that month, was granted a brief leave of absence to tend to her burial before returning on July 5. He was mustered out of service on July 20.

== Postbellum business career ==
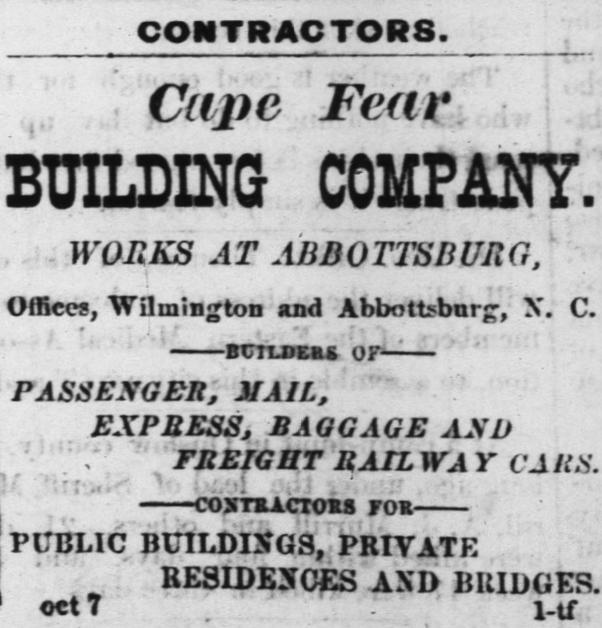
Newspaper advertisement for the Cape Fear Building Company

While stationed in North Carolina as the post commander of Wilmington, Abbott befriended local businessmen. Sensing a business opportunity in a region with ample timber resources and labor but little capital, he ended his affairs in the North and permanently relocated to Wilmington in September 1865. Once there, he began acquiring land and clearing pine forest in Bladen County. Ultimately, he amassed approximately 3,000 of acres of land along the Wilmington, Charlotte and Rutherford Railroad. With the help of other Northern investors, he co-founded two companies, the Bladen Land Company and the Cape Fear Building Company. (Note: The Bladen Land Company was incorporated by Abbott, Daniel Clark, Llewellyn Garrish Estes, and George Z. French. The Cape Fear Building Company was incorporated by Abbott, Alexander Strausz, Henry S. Servoss, and Lawson E. Rice.) The former harvested timber and the latter crafted cut wood products and constructed buildings. Abbott served as president and treasurer of the Bladen Land Company, while the Cape Fear Building Company was largely managed as a partnership, with him managing its business affairs and co-founder Alexander Strausz tending to architectural concerns.

Business initially prospered for Abbott, and his corporations drew praise from across the state's political spectrum. The concentration of the companies' operations in Bladen led to the creation of the community of Abbottsburg. By 1870, the community included a company store, several factory buildings, numerous homes—including one occupied by Abbott, and hosted about 500 residents. The Cape Fear Building Company won key building contracts in Wilmington and advertised its products as a far away as Cuba. By the mid–1870s, deforestation and the economic fallout of the panic Panic of 1873 had diminished its prospects, and in early 1876 the company went bankrupt and was liquidated at auction. One newspaper later reported that Abbott had lost $100,000 in the business failure. As a result, he withdrew to Wilmington.

== Early political activities and 1868 constitutional convention ==
After moving to North Carolina, Abbott became an active leader of the state's new Republican Party. Historian William McKee Evans characterized him ideologically as a man of "Whiggish opinions". He attended and was elected chairman of North Carolina's first Republican convention in September 1867 with the overwhelming support of black and carpetbagger delegates. He attended the Republican state conventions of 1868, 1872, 1876, and 1880. On October 17, 1867, the New Hanover County Republican convention nominated Abbott, Abraham Galloway, and Samuel S. Ashley as their three candidates for the delegation to the constitutional convention. Voters in the county overwhelmingly voted in favor of calling a new constitutional convention and confirmed Abbott, Galloway and Ashley as their delegates.

The state constitutional convention lasted from January to March 1868. The New Hanover delegation was especially active in the convention; The Wilmington Daily Journal claimed that Abbott and Galloway were "running the machine". On the convention's second day—its first full day of business—both men spoke on the floor numerous times. After Calvin J. Cowles was elected convention president, Abbott was voted one of two delegates who escorted him to the presiding chair. (Note: The Republican delegates met in a caucus on January 14 to name their presidential candidate. Abbott trailed Cowles on the first and second ballots and, at his urging, the caucus unanimously nominated Cowles on the third ballot.) The convention was organized into 13 committees to study various issues. Abbott was made chair of the Committee on Finance. He also displayed an active interest in internal improvements. While some Republican delegates favored repudiating the state's debts, Abbott opposed this move and joined with six others in purchasing state bonds with the intent to resell them for profit. The convention voted to declare the state debt inviolable. The convention met in its last session on the morning of March 17. With Cowles not present, Abbott assumed the president's chair. After tending to various business, the convention heard a series of celebratory speeches. On Abbot's motion, the body adjourned for the last time.

Investigations later revealed that Abbott was among several politicians paid by Soutter and Company to secure passage of a legislative ordinance by the convention that backed $1,000,000 in bonds of the Wilmington, Charlotte and Rutherford Railroad and was paid by George William Swepson of the "Railroad Ring" after the convention. Abbott used Swepson's money for bribes to ensure political support for railroad aid, and once this became publicly known he was criticized in the press. (Note: Historian William McKee Evans wrote, "It is significant, however, that from his own constituency in southeastern North Carolina there has been virtually no condemnation of Abbott for his activities on behalf of the railroads, from either his fellow Republicans or his Democratic opponents. [...] Most people in the section to some degree benefited from his impropriety, though few more than Abbott himself, with his three thousand acres of land along the [Wilmington, Charlotte and Rutherford Railroad].") He campaigned across the state for the draft constitution's ratification. The Republicans scored a large victory in the 1868 general election and the constitution was ratified. Abbott was elected to the North Carolina House of Representatives to represent New Hanover County, and served until he resigned effective July 16, 1868. George Z. French was elected to fill the vacancy.

== U.S. Senate ==
The North Carolina General Assembly elected Abbott to the United States Senate on July 14, 1868. He served from then until March 4, 1871. In the U.S. Senate, Abbott became a chief spokesman for federal improvements to the port of Wilmington. (Note: Abbott presented a petition from Wilmington residents appealing for improvements to the city's harbor before the U.S. Congress in 1868. Congress began appropriating funds to improve the Wilmington harbor in 1870. Encouraged by other concerted lobbying efforts, Congress continued making regular outlays for the port of Wilmington's benefit until 1882.) He also introduced an import tax on peanuts.

In 1870, a Conservative majority won control of the General Assembly and, anticipating the expiration of Abbott's term in March 1871, voted to replace him with Zebulon Vance. As he had won the second-most votes in the contest and believed that Vance was disenfranchised under the terms of the Fourteenth Amendment to the United States Constitution, Abbott pressed his claim for reelection, arguing that legislators who knowingly cast their votes for an invalid candidate should have their selections voided. The Senate referred the matter, along with several other credentials disputes, to the Committee on Privileges and Elections on March 13, 1871. The U.S. Senate Committee on Privileges and Elections issued a majority report in February 1872 rejecting Abbott's claim as undemocratic. Vance withdrew his claim to the office and the General Assembly voted again and elected Matt W. Ransom to succeed Abbott. The full Senate eventually voted to reject Abbott's credentials and had Ransom seated on April 24, 1872, though Abbott was permitted to collect pay and travel reimbursement until April 23, 1872.

Abbott attended the Republican National Conventions of 1868 and 1872 served as a member of the Republican National Committee from North Carolina from 1872 through 1876.

== Later political activities ==
For some time, Abbott served as editor of the Wilmington Post. In 1869, he contributed an article titled, "Misrepresentation of Our Public Men", which Joseph Adolphus Engelhard, the editor of the Wilmington Journal, took offense to. Thereafter, Engelhard would find him in public and attempt to force him into a duel. Rather than accept the challenge, Abbott retracted the article.

Abbot was appointed U.S. Customs Collector of the Port of Wilmington by President Ulysses S. Grant. He served from May 16, 1874 until March 27, 1878. As a result of the Compromise of 1877 and the election of Rutherford B. Hayes as U.S. president, Abbot was removed from the Republican National Committee, though the new president appointed him Inspector of Ports for the Southern Coast and as a special agent of the United States Treasury Department. Despite continued support from federal Republican administrations, his political status in North Carolina Republican politics dwindled.

== Later life, death, and legacy ==
With his political prospects and business ventures spent, Abbott spent much of his later life withdrawn to Wilmington and involved in church activities. On April 21, 1880, he married Ellen C. Tasker. The two of them lived in a city hotel. He died in Wilmington following an illness on October 8, 1881. Originally buried in the U.S. National Cemetery in Wilmington, he was reinterred in 1887 at Valley Cemetery in Manchester, New Hampshire. Despite three marriages, he died childless. A local chapter of the Grand Army of the Republic was named for him. The historian J. G. de Roulhac Hamilton was critical of his career in his 1914 work, Reconstruction in North Carolina.

== See also ==
- List of American Civil War Generals (Union)

== Works cited ==
- Bell, John L. (October 1995). "Samuel Stanford Ashley, Carpetbagger and Educator". The North Carolina Historical Review. 72 (4): 456–483. JSTOR 23521495.
- Biographical Directory of the United States Congress, 1774-1989: Bicentennial Edition. United States: Government Printing Office, 1989. ISBN 0-16-006384-1.
- A Biographical Directory of the United States Customs Service, 1771-1989. Vol. 1 (first ed.). Washington D. C.: United States Custom Service. 1985.
- Cecelski, David (2012). The Fire of Freedom: Abraham Galloway and the Slaves' Civil War. Chapel Hill: University of North Carolina. ISBN 978-1-4696-2190-6.
- Cheney, John L. Jr., ed. (1981). North Carolina Government, 1585-1979: A Narrative and Statistical History (revised ed.). Raleigh: North Carolina Secretary of State. OCLC 1290270510.
- Dyer, Frederick H. (1908). A Compendium of the War of the Rebellion. Des Moines: Dyer Publishing Company.
- Eicher, John H.; Eicher, David J. (2001). Civil War High Commands. Stanford: Stanford University Press. ISBN 0-8047-3641-3.
- Evans, William McKee (1995). Ballots and Fence Rails: Reconstruction on the Lower Cape Fear (reprint ed.). Athens: University of Georgia Press. ISBN 0-8203-1731-4.
- Fonvielle, Chris E. Jr. (July 2015). ""Welcome Brothers!" The 1865 Union Prisoners of War Exchange in North Carolina". The North Carolina Historical Review. 92 (3): 278–311. JSTOR 44113271.
- Foote, Lorien (2016). The Yankee Plague: Escaped Union Prisoners and the Collapse of the Confederacy (Ebook ed.). Chapel Hill: The University of North Carolina Press. ISBN 9781469630564.
- Hartzer, Ronald B. (1984). To Great and Useful Purpose: A History of the Wilmington District U.S. Army Corps of Engineers. Wilmington, North Carolina: U.S. Army Corps of Engineers.
- Hunt, Roger D.; Brown, Jack R. (1990). Brevet Brigadier Generals in Blue. Gaithersburg, MD: Olde Soldier Books, Inc. ISBN 1-56013-002-4.
- Johnson, Allen, ed. (1928). Dictionary of American Biography. Vol. I. New York: Charles Scribner's Sons.
- Wilson, J. G.; Fiske, J., eds. (1900). "Abbott, Joseph Carter" . Appletons' Cyclopædia of American Biography. New York: D. Appleton.
- Little, Henry F. W. (1896). The Seventh Regiment New Hampshire Volunteers in the War of the Rebellion. Concord: The Seventh New Hampshire Veteran Association. OCLC 1157212945.
- Olsen, Otto H. (1965). Carpetbagger's Crusade: The Life of Albion Winegar Tourgee. Baltimore: The Johns Hopkins Press. LCCN 65-13522.
- Raper, Horace W. (1985). William W. Holden: North Carolina's Political Enigma. Chapel Hill: University of North Carolina Press. ISBN 0807850608.
- Reaves, William M. (1998). Strength Through Struggle: The Chronological and Historical Record of the African-American Community in Wilmington, North Carolina, 1865-1950. New Hanover Public Library. ISBN 9780967041001.
- Reid, Richard M. (2008). Freedom for Themselves: North Carolina's Black Soldiers in the Civil War Era. Chapel Hill, North Carolina: University of North Carolina Press. ISBN 0-8078-3174-3.
- Shaffer, Duane E. (2008). Men of Granite : New Hampshire's Soldiers in the Civil War. University of South Carolina Press. ISBN 9781570037511.
- Waite, Otis F. R. (1870). New Hampshire in the Great Rebellion. Claremont: Tracy, Chase & Company. LCCN 02014519.

U.S. Senate
Preceded by vacant^{(1)}	U.S. senator (Class 2) from North Carolina; 1868–1871; Served alongside: John Pool	Succeeded by Matt W. Ransom
Notes and references
1. Because of North Carolina's secession from the Union, the seat was vacant from 1861-1868 when Thomas Bragg was expelled from the Senate.
