= Senator Sweet =

Senator Sweet may refer to:

- Benjamin Sweet (1832–1874), Wisconsin State Senate
- W. H. S. Sweet (1838–1890), North Carolina State Senate
- William L. Sweet (1850–1931), New York State Senate
