= Senator Hayes =

Senator Hayes may refer to:

- Antonio Hayes (born 1977), Maryland State Senate
- James E. Hayes (1865–1898), Massachusetts State Senate
- O. S. Hayes (1843–1910), North Carolina State Senate
- Philip H. Hayes (1940–2023), Indiana State Senate
- Robert W. Hayes Jr. (born 1952), South Carolina State Senate
- Thomas Gordon Hayes (1844–1915), Maryland State Senate
- William P. Hayes (1866–1940), Massachusetts State Senate

== See also ==
- Senator Hay (disambiguation)
- Senator Hays (disambiguation)
