= Richard Falkner =

Richard Falkner may refer to:

- Richard Falkner (cricketer)
- Richard Falkner (politician)

== See also ==
- Richard Faulkner, Baron Faulkner of Worcester, British politician
