= Orson R. Colgrove =

Orson Rodolphus Colgrove (June 18, 1826 – May 29, 1869) was an American soldier and military officer who served as sheriff of Jones County, North Carolina from 1867 until he was murdered. A Republican who served with a New York cavalry unit during the American Civil War, he and two brothers moved to North Carolina after the conflict. North Carolina state senator David D. Colgrove was one of his brothers.

== Early life ==
Orson Rodolphus Colgrove was born on June 18, 1826.

Following the outbreak of American Civil War, Colgrove enlisted in the 3rd New York Cavalry Regiment United States Army in Syracuse, New York on June 30, 1861. Mustered in as a private, he was instantly promoted to the rank of sergeant. He was later made first sergeant before being promoted to the rank of second lieutenant in the 15th New York Cavalry Regiment on August 8, 1863. He was promoted to the rank of captain on August 26 and discharged in Kingstowne, Virginia on December 24, 1864. Following the war, Colgrove and two of his brothers, David and John, permanently relocated to North Carolina. He settled in Jones County.

== Career ==
Colgrove joined the Republican Party. Amidst a regional crime wave in eastern North Carolina perpetrated in large part by a loose gang of criminals known as the Regulators, Colgrove urged Jones County residents to petition the federal military authorities in the state to take direct action. On April 26, 1867, some residents met in Trenton and passed a series of resolutions denouncing the Regulators, bemoaning the inaction of local law enforcement, and appealing to U.S. Army General Daniel Sickles. Sickles referred the resolutions to local post commander Captain James J. Van Horn, who suggested replacing the Jones County sheriff and several local magistrates, which Sickles permitted. On September 26, Second Military District commander General Edward Canby officially appointed Colgrove to serve as sheriff of Jones County. Some local residents opposed this action as despotic and local officials refused to bond Colgrove due to him lacking ownership of any real estate in the county. In December 1867, General Canby temporarily placed a group of mounted infantry at the sheriff's disposal.

Being a leading Republican in Jones County and having organized a black militia company, Colgrove was resented by local Conservatives. He also ran afoul of the Constitutional Union Guard (CUG), a white supremacist terrorist organization. On May 1, 1869, Colgrove arrested two CUG members for stealing a mule and imprisoned them in the Lenoir County jail. They were broken out of jail by other CUG members two days later.

== Assassination ==
On May 29, 1869, CUG members from Lenior County ambushed Colgrove on a road outside of Trenton, shooting him from blinds and killing him. A black man who was accompanying him was also killed. At the request of Superior Court Judge Charles R. Thomas, Holden sent a militia company to Trenton to maintain law and order. The presence of the troops temporarily assuaged violence in the county but they left without making any arrests.

== Works cited ==
- Bradley, Mark L. (2011). Bluecoats and Tar Heels: Soldiers and Civilians in Reconstruction North Carolina (paperback ed.). Lexington: The University of Kentucky Press. ISBN 978-0-8131-3385-0.
- Colegrove, William (1894). History and Genealogy of the Colegrove Family in America, with Biographical Sketches, Portraits, Etc. Chicago: William Colegrove. OCLC 1046023663.
- Massengill, Stephen E. (1985). "The Detectives of William W. Holden, 1869–1870". North Carolina Historical Review. 62 (4): 448–487. ISSN 0029-2494. JSTOR 23518497.
- Newton, Michael (April 22, 2014). "The Ku Klux Klan: History, Organization, Language, Influence and Activities of America's Most Notorious Secret Society" (reprint ed.). Jefferson: McFarland. ISBN 9780786495597 – via Google Books.
- Phisterer, Frederick, ed. (1912). New York in the War of the Rebellion, 1861 to 1865. Vol. 2 (3rd ed.). Albany: J. B. Lyon Company.
