= B. W. Morris =

American politician

Benjamin W. Morris was an American teacher and minister who served as a member of the North Carolina House of Representatives. He lived in New Bern and represented Craven County. He and fellow Craven County representative A. W. Stevens were documented as being African Americans and the county was represented by many African Americans until 1891. He also served as a registrar.

He was noted as a teacher. As a reverend, he gave a deposition in 1894.

== See also ==
- North Carolina General Assembly of 1868–1869
- African American officeholders from the end of the Civil War until before 1900
