= Independence, Preston County, West Virginia =

Independence
- Unincorporated community
- Location within the state of West Virginia Independence (the United States)
- Coordinates: 39°23′35″N 79°52′18″W
- Country: United States
- State: West Virginia
- County: Preston
- Elevation: 1,181 ft (360 m)
- Time zone: UTC-5 (Eastern (EST))
  - Summer (DST): UTC-4 (EDT)
- GNIS feature ID: 1540661

Independence is an unincorporated community in Preston County, West Virginia, United States, adjacent to the town of Newburg.

Independence was home to a public primary school. During the 1950s and 1960s the community hosted the popular “Watermelon Days,” which provided amusement and entertainment for much of Preston and Taylor counties.

Watermelon Day was highlighted by the arrival and departure of various B&O trains. Popular among the residents was nearby swimming at Fortney’s Mill. Today the children of Independence attend Preston County Public Schools.

The community's name commemorates Independence Day.

== Notable person ==
- Alexander Strausz- Hungarian-American soldier, architect and settler.
