= Eustace Edward Green =

American teacher, public official and politician

North Carolina House of Representatives
- In office 1882–1883

Personal details
- Born: 1845 Wilmington, North Carolina, U.S.
- Died: June 1, 1931 (aged 86) Detroit, Michigan, U.S.
- Resting place: Linwood Cemetery, Macon, Georgia, U.S.
- Party: Republican
- Education: Lincoln University (A.B., A.M.); Howard University Medical School

Eustace Edward Green Sr. (1845-1931) was an American politician and educator from North Carolina, he was also a medical doctor in Georgia.

== Biography ==
He was born as a slave on February 3, 1845 and was freed upon the arrival of the Union Army in Wilmington on February 25, 1865, towards the end of the American Civil War. He started work as a carpenter whilst obtaining an education in night school. He then went on to receive an A.B. degree from Lincoln University in 1872 and received a A.M. degree from the same university in 1875.

Green started working as a teacher at the normal and preparatory school of the university, later worked as the deputy clerk of the Seventh Judicial District in South Carolina, later became principal of the Hoge Institute in Newberry, South Carolina, and then moved back to North Carolina and became the principal of the Williston, the largest public school in Wilmington. He was a founder and president of the Colored Medical Association as well as president of the National Medical Association. He served on a county board of examiners.

In 1879 he married Georgia Cherry of Tarboro, North Carolina, daughter of former representative Henry C. Cherry and they had four children together.

Green was elected to the North Carolina House of Representatives representing New Hanover County in 1882 whilst he was living in Wilmington and working as a school principal. He was a Republican and he was also anti-prohibition at the time, but criticized for being pro-prohibition the year before. He was nominated for the position of Speaker of the House but withdrew his name not wishing to offend party leaders. He served from in 1882 and 1883 and was selected for three committees: Propositions and Grievances, Penal Institutions and Education.

After his political career he decided to become a doctor and he graduated from Howard University Medical School in 1886. After moving to Macon, Georgia, in 1890 with his wife and children Green opened up a pharmacy called Central City Drug Store and also became a landowner and landlord. Together they advocated African-American education including teaching Henry Rutherford Butler who would go on to be Georgia's first African American pharmacist and marry Selena Sloan Butler.

He died June 1, 1931, in Detroit whilst visiting his family. He is buried at Linwood Cemetery in Macon, Georgia. He lived at 353 Madison Street. His home is extant.

== See also ==
- African American officeholders from the end of the Civil War until before 1900
