= Edwin Legg =

American politician

North Carolina Senate
- In office 1868–1869

Personal details
- Died: October 7, 1894 (aged 57)
- Party: Republican

Edwin Legg (died 1894) was a delegate to the 1868 North Carolina Constitutional Convention and a state legislator in North Carolina. He represented New Hanover County and Brunswick County in the North Carolina Senate after the Reconstruction era North Carolina Constitution of 1868 was passed.

== Biography ==
Legg served in the Union Army. One source describes him as an ex-sutler of the Federal Army. He worked for the customs service in Wilmington.

In 1868 he was paid for work as postmaster of the Smithville post office. He resigned as Smithville's postmaster in 1874. He was also documented as a merchant. He was elected a delegate for Brunswick County, North Carolina, at the 1868 North Carolina Constitutional Convention.

He was selected along with Abraham Galloway to stand on the Republican ticket for the 15th senatorial district. Both candidates were successfully elected. He represented Brunswick County and New Hanover County in the North Carolina Senate from 1868 until 1869.

He was white.

Legg died October 7, 1894, in Worcester, Massachusetts, from a heart attack aged 57. He was buried in Brookfield, Massachusetts, and was survived by his wife and son. His wife, Mrs. Harriet J. Legg died a few months later in July 1895.

== See also ==
- North Carolina General Assembly of 1868–1869
