= George Z. French =

George Zadoc French (died October 11, 1904) was an American politician and businessman. Originally from the state of Maine, he moved to Wilmington, North Carolina, at the close of the American Civil War and entered into business as a merchant and land speculator. He also acquired a plantation and established a lime production business. Politically, French was an active member of the Republican Party. He served three terms in the North Carolina House of Representatives. Exiled from Wilmington in wake of the 1898 insurrection, he retired to his plantation before dying in Maine in 1904.

== Early life ==
George Zadoc French originated from the state of Maine in the United States. His parents were George S. French and Ann French.

== Civil War ==
French accompanied the U.S. Army into Wilmington, North Carolina, as a sutler during the American Civil War. He quickly obtained use of an abandoned store building and used it to sell clothing, liquor, and tobacco to the occupying forces. The city was soon flooded with released Union prisoners, many of whom were destitute. Willing to make advances, French supplied the men with $4,000 in cash and goods pending repayment, though within five months he had only collected one third of that amount.

== Postwar business career ==
By the autumn of 1865, French was retailing civilian goods in Wilmington and consigning cotton and naval stores from rural residents. Encouraged by the diminished real estate prices in the area, he was also drawn into land speculation. He acquired significant tracts of land and, to being without the capital necessary to hire labor clear it, he offered families the option to clear the land in exchange for three years of tenancy without having to pay rent. He co-incorporated the Bladen Land Company with fellow Northern investors Daniel Clark, Llewellyn Garrish Estes, and Joseph Carter Abbott. He later served as a clerk for Abbott's Bladen Lumber Company. He also invested in railroads and secured a government contract to salvage ships sunk outside of the port of Wilmington during the war.

French's energies focused on a plantation he acquired at Rocky Point along the Cape Fear River to the north of Wilmington. He named the property Excelsior and organized the Excelsior Plantation Company to operate it. (Note: The company was chartered by the North Carolina General Assembly and French was made president on March 31, 1870.) Keen on modern farming techniques, he devoted much of time to obtaining fertilizer. After discovering limestone deposits on the plantation, he established quarries and began manufacturing agricultural lime. His production soon outpaced the plantation's needs and he became a key local supplier of lime to other customers. The agricultural operations at the plantation were also successful. By the early 1870s, French was growing fruits and vegetables for export to the North and had earned praise from The Wilmington Journal for being among "one of our very best farmers". Pursuant to his agricultural activities, he joined the New Hanover Agricultural Society and the Grange.

== Political career ==
Politically, French was an active member of the Republican Party. Unlike many of his contemporaries in the Cape Fear region, he had no hesitations in seeking the political support of local black men. His influence upon the black population of Wilmington was so great that several black men formed a baseball team named in his honor. He also at times served on the Wilmington Board of Aldermen and chaired the New Hanover County Republican Party.

French won an election to the North Carolina House of Representatives seat representing New Hanover County in 1868 to fill a vacancy created by the resignation of Abbott. Seated on November 16, he was again elected in 1870 and served until 1872. He was later implicated in the "Railroad Ring" scandal for having taken bribes from banker George William Swepson to encourage state support of his railroad investment schemes.

French was a delegate to the state's 1875 constitutional convention. He and fellow delegate William F. Strowd led the effort to amend the constitution to require the North Carolina General Assembly to create a state department of agriculture by law.

French was elected again to North Carolina House of Representatives in 1894, serving during its 1895 session. Together with fellow legislator Frederick Rice, French introduced a bill which modified the city of Wilmington's charter. Passed into law, the legislation created a legislatively-appointed Police Board to oversee hiring of municipal workers.

During the Fusionist era, French served as the chief deputy of the New Hanover County Sheriff's Office under Elijah Hewlett.

During the Wilmington insurrection, anti-Fusionist activists captured leading Republican officials in the city with plans to drive them into exile. French was especially hated by this faction for organizing black voters but could not initially be located. To avoid possible lynching, he hid in the Orton Hotel. As a mob gathered near the train station to send their captives out of the city, French appeared on the streets and was quickly targeted. Pushing past the Wilmington Light Infantry sentinels, they grabbed French, adorned him with a noose, and attempted to hang him over a telephone pole. The attempted lynching was stopped on the intervention of insurrectionist F. H. Stedman and two other prominent local Democrats, who declared that such a prominent lynching would tarnish the city and lead to criminal prosecution. French was thus released and allowed to join the others on the train, which took the exiles to New Bern. From there, they were put aboard a steamer and sent to Elizabeth City.

== Later life and death ==
After being driven from Wilmington, French retired to his home at Rocky Point. After experiencing a bout of ill health, he traveled to Maine to recuperate. He died in the city of Bangor on October 9, 1904.

== Works cited ==
- Beckel, Deborah (2011). Radical Reform: Interracial Politics in Post-Emancipation North Carolina. Charlottesville: University of Virginia Press. ISBN 978-0-8139-3002-2.
- Bell, John L. (October 1995). "Samuel Stanford Ashley, Carpetbagger and Educator". The North Carolina Historical Review. 72 (4): 456–483. JSTOR 23521495.
- Cheney, John L. Jr., ed. (1981). North Carolina Government, 1585-1979: A Narrative and Statistical History (revised ed.). Raleigh: North Carolina Secretary of State. OCLC 1290270510.
- Evans, William McKee (1995). Ballots and Fence Rails: Reconstruction on the Lower Cape Fear (reprint ed.). Athens: University of Georgia Press. ISBN 0-8203-1731-4.
- History of Penobscot County, Maine : With Illustrations and Biographical Sketches. Cleveland: Williams, Chase & Company. 1882.
- Noblin, Stuart (April 1943). "Leonidas Lafayette Polk and the North Carolina Department of Agriculture: Part I: The Genesis of the Department". The North Carolina Historical Review. XX (2): 103–121. JSTOR 23515160.
- Prather, H. Leon (1998). We Have Taken a City : Wilmington Racial Massacre and Coup of 1898 (second ed.). Wilmington: Nu World Enterprises. ISBN 0-9664006-0-7.
- Zucchino, David (2021). Wilmington's Lie: The Murderous Coup of 1898 and the Rise of White Supremacy. New York: Grove Press. ISBN 978-0-8021-4865-0.
