= Abbottsburg, North Carolina =

- Unincorporated community
- Location within North Carolina
- Coordinates: 34°31′02″N 78°43′30″W
- Country: United States
- State: North Carolina
- County: Bladen
- Elevation: 108 ft (33 m)
- Time zone: UTC-5 (Eastern (EST))
  - Summer (DST): UTC-4 (EDT)
- Area codes: 910, 472
- GNIS feature ID: 980015

Abbottsburg is an unincorporated community in Bladen County, North Carolina, United States.

In 1950, the community had a population of 157.

== History ==
Abbottsburg was named for Joseph Carter Abbott. In 1865, he began clearing land in a pine forest, eventually establishing the Bladen Land Company to harvest timber and the Cape Fear Building Company to craft wood products and construct buildings. By 1870, the community comprised a company store, several factory buildings, numerous homes, and hosted approximately 500 residents. Deforestation and pressures stemming from the Panic of 1873 led the Cape Fear Building Company to go bankrupt and auction its holdings in 1876. The entire community was resold in 1878 to two Wilmington investors who reestablished lumber operations, though several years later their mills were destroyed by a fire, leading Abbottsburg to decline.

Abbottsburg was incorporated in 1903, though it later disincorporated.

== Works cited ==
- Powell, William S. (1976). The North Carolina Gazetteer: A Dictionary of Tar Heel Places. Chapel Hill: University of North Carolina Press. ISBN 9780807812471.
