= Senator Hay =

Senator Hay may refer to:

- Daniel Hay (1781–1853), Illinois State Senate
- James Hay (politician) (1856–1931), Virginia State Senate
- Logan Hay (1871–1942), Illinois State Senate
- Samuel M. Hay (1825–1906), Wisconsin State Senate

== See also ==
- Senator Hayes (disambiguation)
- Senator Hays (disambiguation)
