= David D. Colgrove =

American politician

David Delos Colgrove (May 22, 1836 – January 2, 1873) was an American who served as a delegate to North Carolina's constitutional convention in 1868 and as a member of the North Carolina Senate from 1868 to 1870. He was a Republican.

== Early life ==
David Delos Colgrove was born on May 22, 1836 in Truxton, New York. He married Jennie Sanford. They had one son together.

== Career ==
Following the American Civil War, Colgrove joined two of his half brothers, Orson and John, in moving to North Carolina. A member of the Republican Party, he served as a delegate to the state's 1868 constitutional convention and as a member of the North Carolina Senate, representing the 11th district, from 1868 to 1870.

Orson became sheriff of Jones County and in that capacity ran afoul of the Constitutional Union Guard, a white supremacist terrorist organization, after arresting some of its members. After murdering Orson in 1869, white supremacists posted threats to Colgrove and other Jones County Republicans. Following the murder of a Republican on August 16, Colgove and fellow legislator Lorenzo D. Wilkie fled to Craven County.

He testified about his half-brother's murder.

== Death ==
Colgrove died of pneumonia at his home in New Bern, North Carolina on January 2, 1873.

== Works cited ==
- Cheney, John L. Jr., ed. (1981). North Carolina Government, 1585-1979: A Narrative and Statistical History (revised ed.). Raleigh: North Carolina Secretary of State. OCLC 1290270510.
- Colegrove, William (1894). History and Genealogy of the Colegrove Family in America, with Biographical Sketches, Portraits, Etc. Chicago: William Colegrove. OCLC 1046023663.
- Massengill, Stephen E. (1985). "The Detectives of William W. Holden, 1869–1870". North Carolina Historical Review. 62 (4): 448–487. ISSN 0029-2494. JSTOR 23518497.
