= Edward A. Johnson =

American politician

Edward Austin Johnson
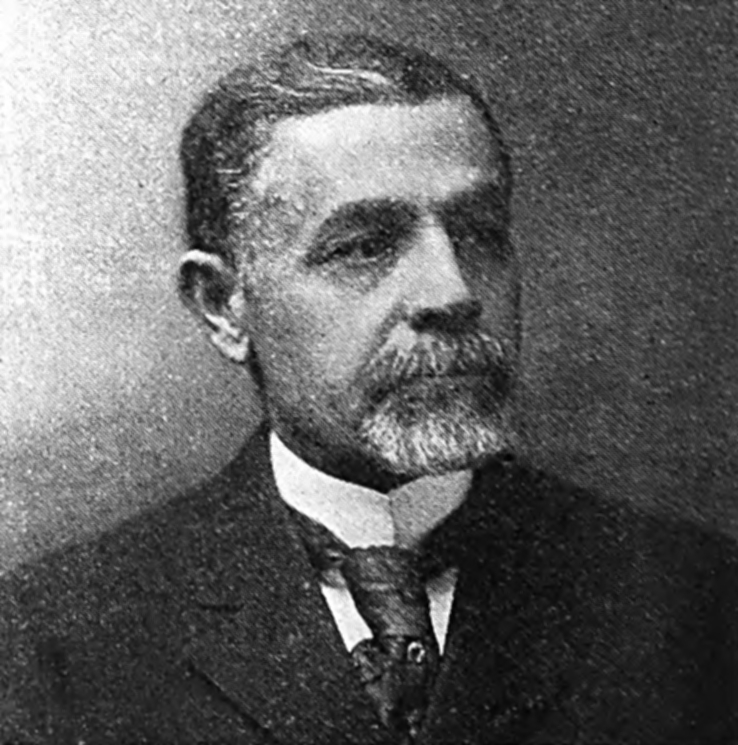
- Johnson c. 1917

Member of the New York State Assembly from the 19th district
- In office January 1, 1918 – December 31, 1918
- Preceded by: Perry M. Armstrong
- Succeeded by: Martin J. Healy

Personal details
- Born: November 23, 1860 Wake County, North Carolina
- Died: July 24, 1944 (aged 83) New York, New York
- Party: Republican
- Education: Atlanta University (1883); Shaw University (1891)
- Profession: Attorney, educator

Edward Austin Johnson (November 23, 1860 – July 24, 1944) was an attorney who became the first African-American member of the New York state legislature when he was elected to the New York State Assembly in 1917.

== Biography ==
Johnson was born in slavery in Wake County, North Carolina. Johnson, in his early education, was taught by a free colored woman, Miss Nancy Walton. He continued his education at Washington High School. He then attended Atlanta University and worked as a school principal from 1883 until 1891, first in Atlanta and then in Raleigh, North Carolina. Meanwhile, he wrote A School History of the Negro Race in America, which was the first textbook by a black author to be approved by the North Carolina State Board of Education for use in the public schools.

Johnson earned a law degree at Shaw University in 1891 and thereafter practiced law in the Raleigh area while also teaching at Shaw. He was the first graduate of the law school at Shaw and served as dean, following John S. Leary in that capacity. Johnson won every case that he argued before the North Carolina Supreme Court. From 1899 to 1907, he was an assistant to the U.S. Attorney for eastern North Carolina. Johnson became active in the Republican Party and served a term on Raleigh's city board of aldermen.

In 1907, Johnson left North Carolina for New York City. He became active in Harlem and in the Republican Party there. He was a member of the New York State Assembly (New York Co., 19th D.) in 1918. In 1928, he ran for Congress in the 21st District but lost to Royal H. Weller. Despite his loss, he received the greatest number of votes from the Republican party in his district. Even with the loss of his sight in 1925, he continued to work in politics and on various projects that supported his country and race.

== Publications ==
In 1890, Johnson wrote a children's textbook entitled A School History of the Negro Race in America from 1619 to 1890, after the Raleigh School Superintendent convinced him that there was need for a history textbook for children about African American achievements. It was published in four editions until 1911 and was adopted by Virginia and North Carolina black schools. In 1899, Johnson wrote his second textbook entitled History of the Negro Soldiers in the Spanish American War and Other Items of Interest. In 1904, Johnson wrote a utopian novel entitled Light Ahead for the Negro, which describes a 2006 future in which there is no anti-black discrimination. In 1928, Johnson published his last book, Adam vs Ape-Man in Ethiopia.

== Family ==
Edward Austin Johnson was born to Eliza Adelaide Smith and Columbus Johnson/Hines. His mother Eliza was enslaved by Sylvester Smith near Raleigh while his father Columbus was enslaved nearby by the daughters of Richard Hines, Rowena and Susan Hines.

New York State Assembly
Preceded by Perry M. Armstrong	New York State Assembly; New York County, 19th District; 1918	Succeeded by Martin J. Healy
