= Senator Hays =

Senator Hays may refer to:

- Charles Hays (1834–1879), Alabama State Senate
- Samuel Hays (Pennsylvania politician) (1783–1868), Pennsylvania State Senate
- Wayne Hays (1911–1989), Ohio State Senate

== See also ==
- Senator Hay (disambiguation)
- Senator Hayes (disambiguation)
