= Hiram Stilley =

American politician

Hiram E. Stilley (? - 1897) was a lawyer, public official, and mercantilist who served as a state legislator in North Carolina. He represented Beaufort County, North Carolina in the North Carolina House of Representatives and North Carolina Senate.

He also held an assessor post for the Internal Revenue Service. He was elected to the North Carolina Senate for the 1872 term.

Stilley died of heart failure on February 11, 1897 at his store in Washington, aged about 60.

== See also ==
- North Carolina General Assembly of 1868–1869
