= Thomas A. Sykes =

American theologian and politician (born c. 1835)

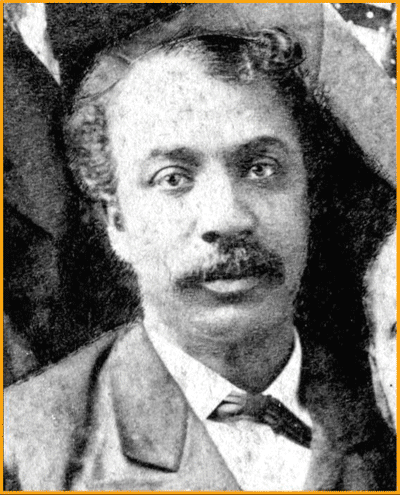

North Carolina House of Representatives
- In office 1868–1872

Tennessee House of Representatives
- In office 1881–1882

Personal details
- Born: c. 1835 North Carolina, U.S.
- Occupation: Politician

Thomas A. Sykes (born c. 1835) was an American politician and tax official. An African-American, he was born into slavery. After the Civil War, he served as a Republican member of the North Carolina House of Representatives for four one-year terms (1868–1872) and as a member of the Tennessee House of Representatives for one two-year term (1881–82). He represented Shelby County, Tennessee. He also served as a revenue collector and gauger. He lived in Nashville.

== Early life ==
Sykes was born enslaved.

== Early political career ==
Sykes served on the North Carolina Republican Party State Executive Committee in 1868.

== North Carolina House of Representatives ==
Sykes was elected to the North Carolina House of Representatives in 1868, representing Pasquotank County. He was reelected in 1870 and served until 1872. During the first session of the 1868 legislature, he served on the House's Committee on Privileges and Elections and on a joint Committee on Public Buildings and Grounds. In the second session, he served on the House's Committee on Public Grounds and Committee on Education. During the 1870 legislature, he served on the Committee on Privileges and Elections, the Committee on Enrolled Bills, and the joint Committee on Per Diem.

In 1870, Sykes proposed the levy of a tax of one tenth of one percent of all property to generate revenue to support public education. The bill did not pass. In January 1872, he introduced a successful resolution which dedicated revenue from the sale of public lands to supporting public education. He introduced a bill on February 21, 1870 which provided for citizens of all races to utilize all public conveyances which was unsuccessful. In early 1871, Sykes voted with a majority of the House in favor of impeaching Governor William Woods Holden on a charge related to fraud concerning the issuance of state railway bonds.

== See also ==
- African American officeholders from the end of the Civil War until before 1900
- North Carolina General Assembly of 1868–1869

== Works cited ==
- Balanoff, Elizabeth (January 1972). "Negro Legislators in the North Carolina General Assembly, July, 1868-February, 1872". The North Carolina Historical Review. 49 (1): 22–55. JSTOR 23529002.
