= Richard Falkner (politician) =

State legislator in North Carolina

Richard Falkner was an American state legislator in North Carolina. He served in the North Carolina House of Representatives for two terms from 1868 to 1871.

From 1868 to 1871 he served with William Cawthorn in the North Carolina House representing Warren County, North Carolina.

== See also ==
- African American officeholders from the end of the Civil War until before 1900
