= James R. Ellis =

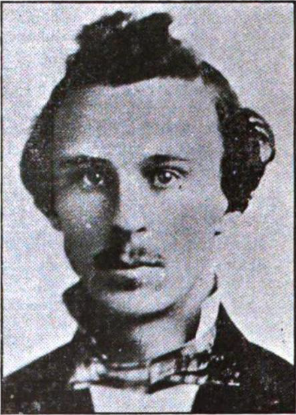
James R. Ellis

James Ransom Ellis (1834 – April 3, 1891) was an American politician. Trained as a physician, he practiced medicine in Burke and Catawba counties, North Carolina, until the outbreak of the American Civil War. He briefly served as a captain and surgeon in the Confederate States Army before resigning his commission to serve on the State Board of Medical Examiners. Following the war he represented Catawba County in the North Carolina House of Representatives from 1868 to 1870 and in the North Carolina Senate in 1872. In his later life he was engaged in real estate.

== Early life ==
James Ransom Ellis was born in Davidson County, North Carolina in 1834. He completed his early schooling in Randolph County and graduated from Jefferson Medical College in Philadelphia in 1858. He subsequently moved to Burke County in 1858 to begin practicing medicine and shortly thereafter married. In 1860, he moved to Hickory Tavern in Catawba County to practice there.

Ellis enlisted in the Confederate States Army on October 15, 1861. He was elected captain of Company K of the 35th Regiment, North Carolina Infantry. At its formal organization on November 8, he was made the regimental surgeon. After serving as surgeon for five months, Ellis resigned his commission to accept an appointment to the North Carolina Board of Medical Examiners.

== Political career ==
Ellis retired from the practice of medicine around the time he became actively involved in politics. He served as a delegate to the state constitutional conventions of 1866 and 1868. He represented Catawba County in the North Carolina House of Representatives from 1868 to 1870 and in the North Carolina Senate in 1872.

== Later life ==
Following his move to Hickory Tavern, Ellis became an investor and editor in a local newspaper, The Carolina Eagle. The publication was later renamed the Piedmont Press before being subsumed by The Press and Carolinian. From 1874 onwards he was engaged in real estate and construction. Following the death of his wife, Ellis became unwell and was hospitalized in Morganton, where he died on April 3, 1891.

== Works cited ==
- Cheney, John L. Jr., ed. (1981). North Carolina Government, 1585-1979: A Narrative and Statistical History (revised ed.). Raleigh: North Carolina Secretary of State. OCLC 1290270510.
- Hahn, George W. (1911). The Catawba Soldier of the Civil War. Hickory: Clay Printing Company.
- Phifer, Edward W. (January 1959). "Certain Aspects of Medical Practice in Ante-Bellum Burke County". The North Carolina Historical Review. 36 (1): 28–46. JSTOR 23516878.
- Sheek, Ann Ellis (1974). History of Twelve Generations of the Ellis Family, 1636 to 1974. Clemmons, North Carolina: Sheek. CS71.E47.
