= Wilmington National Cemetery =

Historic veterans cemetery in New Hanover County, North Carolina

- U.S. National Register of Historic Places
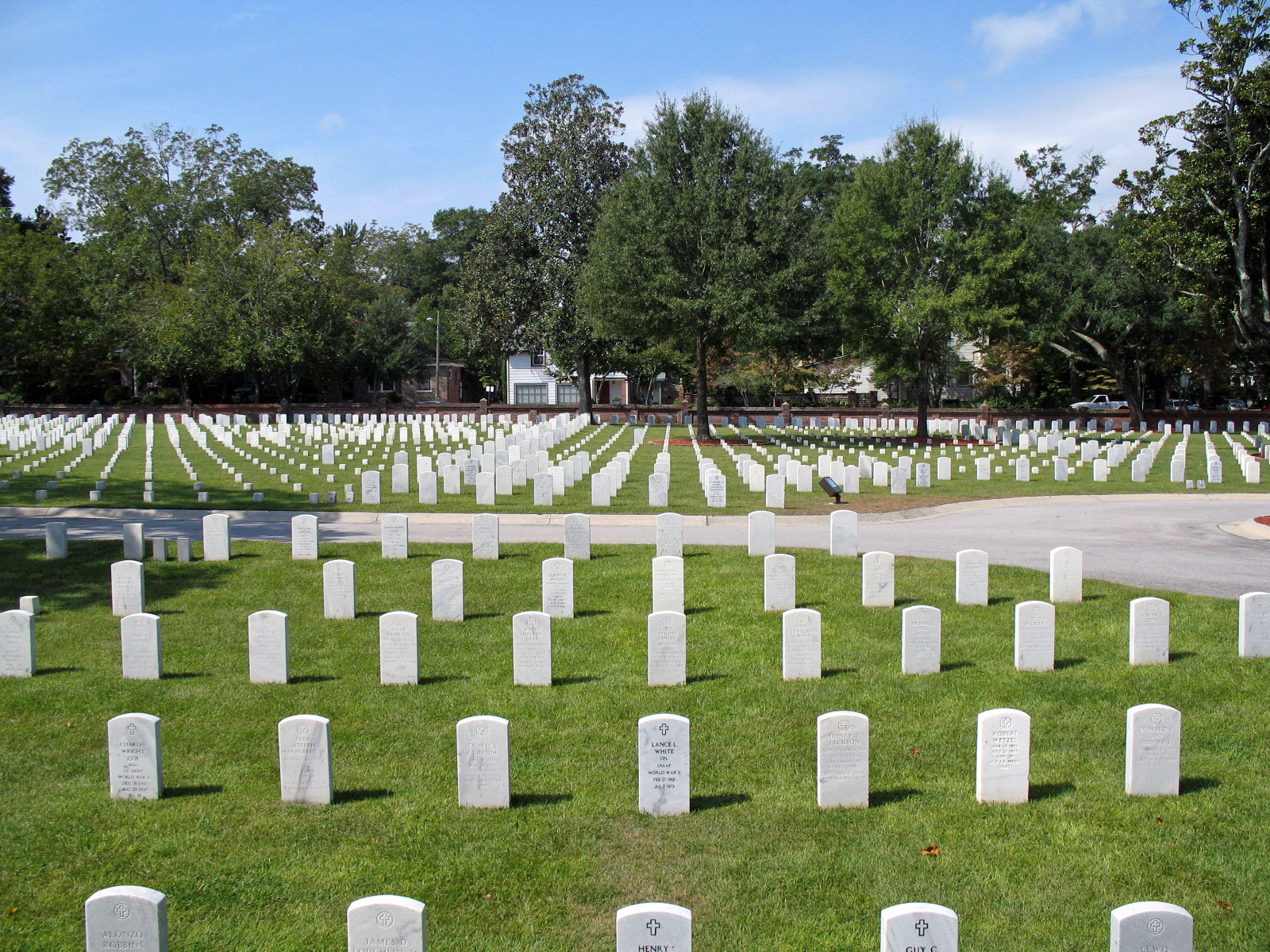

- Location within North Carolina Location within the United States
- Location: 2011 Market St., Wilmington, North Carolina
- Coordinates: 34°14′18″N 77°55′22″W
- Built: 1867
- Architectural style: Colonial Revival
- MPS: Civil War Era National Cemeteries MPS
- NRHP reference No.: 97000021
- Added to NRHP: January 31, 1997

Wilmington National Cemetery is a United States National Cemetery located in the city of Wilmington, in New Hanover County, North Carolina. Administered by the United States Department of Veterans Affairs, it encompasses 5.1 acres (2.1 ha), and as of the end of 2005, had over 6,000 interred remains.

== History ==
In 1867, the land for Wilmington National Cemetery was purchased by the federal government. Most of the original interments were remains moved from Wilmington City Cemetery and nearby forts, such as Fort Fisher. By 1870 there were over 2,000 interments.

In 1918, there was an outbreak of influenza on board a ship docked at the Cape Fear River which was carrying a group of Puerto Rican laborers to Fayetteville, North Carolina to aid in the construction of Camp Bragg. Twenty-eight of the laborers died from the disease and were interred at Wilmington National Cemetery.

Wilmington National Cemetery was listed on the National Register of Historic Places in 1997.

== Notable interments ==
- John S. W. Eagles (c. 1843–1901), soldier and politician
- George "Possum" Whitted (1890–1962), major league baseball player, World War I veteran.

There is one British Commonwealth war grave, of a Royal Artillery Gunner of World War II.
