= Alexander Strausz =

American architect

- Born: Alexander Strausz; 6 April 1829; Habsburg Empire
- Died: 22 January 1905 (aged 75); Toledo, Ohio, United States
- Occupation: Architect
- Spouse: Annie Young
- Children: 6

Alexander Strausz (1829–1905) was a Hungarian-born American brewer, cartographer, architect, mining engineer, industrialist and school superintendent.

== Early life ==
Strausz (pronounced strooss) was born to a well-to-do family in Budapest, Hungary, as evident by his educated abilities. During the Hungarian Revolution of 1848, he served as a lieutenant under Gen. Artúr Görgey, surrendering with him at Világos (now Şiria, Romania) in 1849. He was taken prisoner by the Russians, then released into custody of the Austrians for service in the Austrian army in Italy. However, he and several others deserted, seeking refuge first in Hamburg, then in London, UK, in 1850. On 18 April 1851, he arrived in the United States at the port of Boston, Massachusetts, with a letter of introduction to Edward Everett. He was supposedly also acquainted with Daniel Webster. He worked briefly for an architectural firm in Boston, but did not receive adequate compensation. By the end of the year, he was working for the US Coast Survey.

== Personal life in America ==
He met and married the former Annie Young (1837–1889) of Washington, D.C., one of the daughters of Noble Young, M.D. They had one son, Philip H. (1861–1907) prior to the war, and a few other children after the war: Minnie, Julian, Alex Jr. (1872–1915), Louisa and Henry (1877–1922).

Philip would later attend West Virginia University between 1881 and 1883, and earned his medical degree from New York University's Bellevue Hospital Medical College in 1885. His years of medical service included serving on the American Volunteer Medical Corps' Yellow Fever Experts in 1888. He was married to the former Lida Davis, and they had two children. Upon his death in Toledo, Ohio, he was buried in Oak Grove Cemetery, Morgantown, West Virginia.

Alex Jr. would later become an auditor for various railway companies in Texas, the Philippines and Mexico City. He married the former Mary Hattie Hubbard of Florida. He died from medical complications and never recovered from surgery while working in the Philippines. They had two children, Fenton Egbert who died of a brain tumor (1900–1910) and Mary Helen (1912–2011) in St. Louis, Missouri. Upon Alex Jr.'s death, Mary Helen Hubbard Strausz took her four-year-old daughter to Los Angeles, California and eventually remarried. Mary Helen Strausz married Louis Paul Crespi (1931), from the family of Father Crespí who built the California Missions with Father Junípero Serra, and had one child Shirley Louise Crespi (1932–2002). Shirley Louise Crespi married Kenneth Elden Pepping (1929–2012) and they had two daughters.

Henry Noble "Harry" Strausz would serve in the 6th Ohio Infantry during the Spanish War, and later became a dentist in New Orleans, Louisiana. He married the former Olive Agnes Pratt of Ohio. They had one son, Julien.

Strausz's in-laws were notable. Dr. Young had five surviving children, Albert, Annie, Elizabeth, Minna and Ellen. Elizabeth married Felix Nemegyei, another Hungarian revolutionary and refugee. Minna married Col. Edward Field, son of Richard Stockton Field. Ellen married Gen. Harry C. Egbert. Sons-in-law to the last couple included Gen. Charles E. Kilbourne and Adm. Yates Stirling Jr.

== Shuter's Hill Brewery ==
In 1858, he partnered with John Klein to set up Shuter's Hill Brewery, which is located at the base of Shooter's Hill in Alexandria, Virginia, close to Hooff's Run, where King and Duke Streets now extend. This venture introduced lager beer to Virginia. In 1860, he sold out his interest in the company for US$2,000.

== U.S. Coast Survey ==
In 1851, he joined the U.S. Coast Survey as a draughtsman. This post was secured by Edward Everett. He participated in one significant campaign in the American Civil War: the Vicksburg Campaign.

=== Vicksburg ===
As the Mississippi Campaign focused on Vicksburg, Admiral David Dixon Porter required updated and accurate navigational charts of the area in November 1862. In December 1862, Porter sent Strausz to reconnoiter the riverside defenses of that city. Under a flag of truce, he was able to sketch out the battery positions, convincing Porter of the impracticality of attacking the place by water alone. He was active during the venture of Steele's Bayou of March 1863 until Porter decided to call it off. It was during this time that he met and become good friends with Julius H. Kroehl. In June 1863, he was detached to survey the Confederate works from Lauman's extreme left until it would meet up with survey teams of McClernand's Corps. He came down with malaria, and would have to recuperate for several months.

=== Other USCS activities ===
- Leader, Hydrographic party around New Bern, North Carolina, in 1864.
- Member, Hydrographic party in the Hudson River, New York, in 1864.
- Member, Hydrographic party along the coast of Maine, until November 1864.
- Leader, Hydrographic party on the San Juan River, Nicaragua, in 1865.

== Post-War ==
=== Wilmington ===
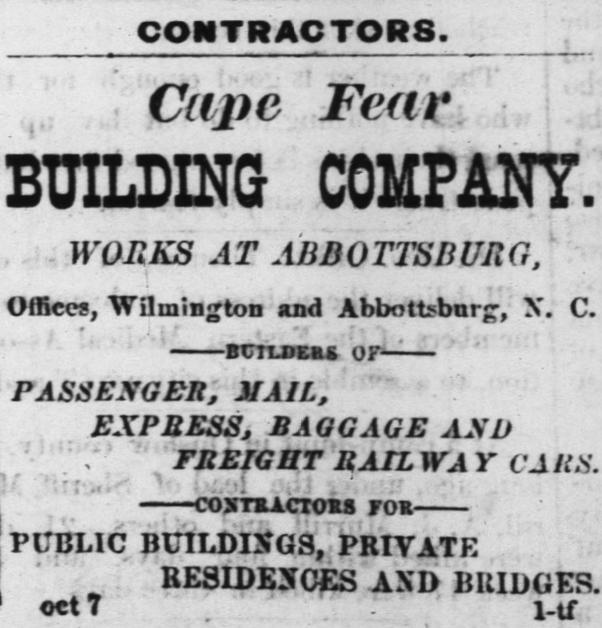
Newspaper advertisement for the Cape Fear Building Company

In 1867, taking advantage of the building surge in Wilmington, North Carolina, Strausz and his family relocated there. He partnered with Lawson E. Rice to form the Cape Fear Building Co. A few structures that he either designed or built still remain and are listed in the National Register of Historical Places. These places are the Strausz House, the Hasell-Parsley House, the William A. French House, the Temple of Israel and the Tileston School. He was also building railway cars.

=== Irondale ===
In 1878, a fellow émigré and brother-in-law, Col. Felix de Nemegyei, hired him when he briefly lived in Philadelphia, Pennsylvania, to manage the Irondale Furnace near Independence, West Virginia, producing wrought iron. Both their wives were also sisters. He continued to live and work there until 1885, when the plant was closed down. The primary causes were the increasing competition from Bessemer steel and workers' demand for higher wages. In 1879, he provided a statement to Sophia Kroehl on the nature of her late husband's illness to be included in her pension application.

=== Palatka ===
In 1885, he and his family relocated to Palatka, Florida, buying 4 acres (16,000 m^{2}) near the St. Johns River. He was the secretary and treasurer of the Palatka Milling Company. He also served as superintendent of schools from 1889 to 1892. Annie Young Strausz is buried along with one small son in West View Cemetery in Palatka, Florida. It is believed they died of the yellow fever epidemic that struck about that time. In 1890, he responded again to Sophia Kroehl's request for a statement. Shortly thereafter, he retired and left for Toledo, Ohio.

=== Retirement ===
Already widowed, he lived with his eldest son, Philip, who had established himself as a physician, and his family. He lived there until his death in 1905. His place of burial is undetermined at this time.
