= Parker David Robbins =

American politician

Parker David Robbins (c. 1834–November 1, 1917) was a Union Army soldier during the American Civil War, among the first Black representatives to the North Carolina House of Representatives in 1868–1869, and inventor from Bertie County, North Carolina.

== Biography ==
Parker David Robbins had mixed ancestry with Chowan Native American ancestry. He was born in about 1834 in either Colerain Township, Bertie County, North Carolina or the Choanoac Indian community of Gates County, North Carolina. His father was John A. Robbins and his mother is unknown. Records list him as a free Black. He worked as a carpenter and mechanic and obtained a 102 acre farm in North Carolina before the Civil War. After the Civil War broke out, he went to Norfolk, Virginia in 1863 and enlisted in the Union Army. He was assigned to the 2nd United States Colored Cavalry Regiment, where he attained the rank of Sergeant-Major. His service came to an end in 1866, due to illness. There upon, he returned home.

He was a representative to the North Carolina Constitutional Convention in January through March 1868. Robbins was one of fifteen African-Americans to be elected in August 1868 to the North Carolina General Assembly of 1868-1869 as a representative from Bertie County to the House of Representatives. He was subsequently elected to the same position in the 1870-1872 legislature.

He was selected as postmaster of the town of Harrellsville, North Carolina. He obtained a patent for a cotton cultivator and a saw sharpener.

== See also ==
- African American officeholders from the end of the Civil War until before 1900
- North Carolina General Assembly of 1868–1869
