= A. A. Crawford =

US state legislator in North Carolina

A. A. Crawford (c. 1833–1897) was a state legislator in North Carolina. He served in the North Carolina House of Representatives from Granville County from 1868 to 1870. Crawford was one of the first African American state legislators in a former slave state after the American Civil War.

== See also ==
- North Carolina General Assembly of 1868–1869
