= John Sinclair Leary =

American politician

John S. Leary
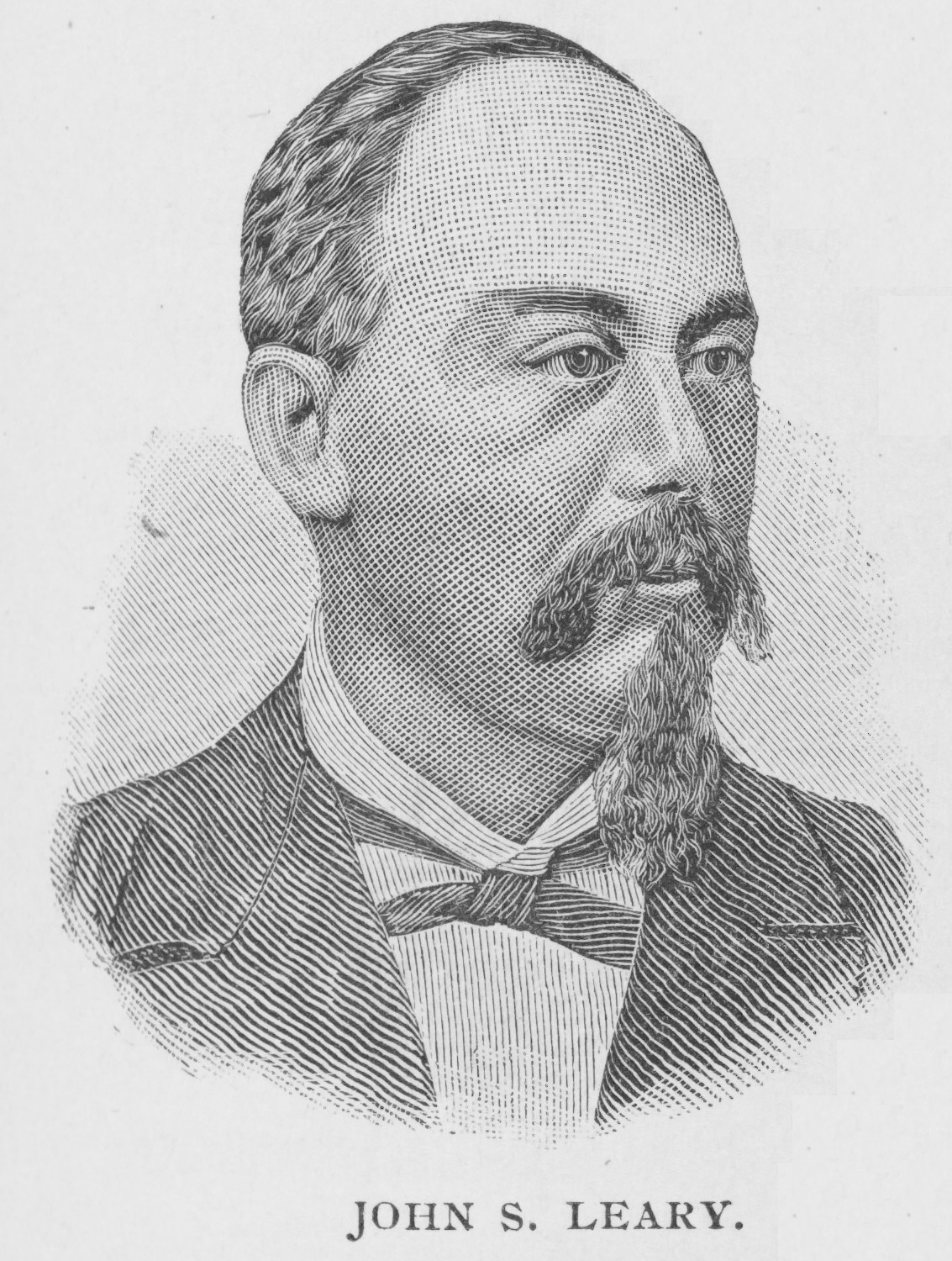
- Leary in 1887
- Born: August 17, 1845; Fayetteville, North Carolina, U.S.
- Died: December 9, 1904 (aged 59); Charlotte, North Carolina, U.S.
- Education: Howard University
- Occupations: Lawyer, politician, professor
- Political party: Republican

John Sinclair Leary (August 17, 1845 – December 9, 1904) was an American lawyer, politician, federal official, and law school dean. He was of mixed ethnicity. He is described as one of the first black lawyers in North Carolina and was a member of the state legislature from 1868 to 1870. He was an alderman in Fayetteville and later held federal government appointments. He was the first dean of the law school at Shaw University in 1890.

== Early life ==
John S. Leary was born August 17, 1845, in Fayetteville, North Carolina to Matthew Leary and Julia Memriel. Matthew's father Jeremiah Leary was a mixed-race Irishman who married Sally Revels, a mixed Black woman. Both were of theorized Croatan descent. Sally's father was Aaron Revels, and both Aaron Revels and Jeremiah Leary were veterans of the American Revolutionary War. Leary had at least three siblings, Lewis Sheridan Leary, Henrietta, and Michael Leary, Jr. Lewis was killed taking part in John Brown's raid on Harpers Ferry in 1859. Through Revels, Leary was a cousin to Hiram Rhodes Revels, the first African American to serve in the United States Senate.

Matthew Leary, Sr. was one of the wealthiest African Americans both before and after the American Civil War. His business was successful enough that as early as 1848 he was credit-rated and owned property worth $6,000 in 1870. Matthew, Sr. died March 22, 1880, at the age of 82. John's brother, Matthew Leary, Jr. went into politics as well and became a federal government clerk in Washington, D.C. and died On January 26, 1892.

John attended school in Fayetteville for about eight years before 1861. He then learned the trade of a saddler and harness-maker in his father's shop where his father had worked for a long time.

== Career ==
Leary participated in the first Republican Party meeting in Cumberland County at Evans Chapel on April 4, 1867. In 1868, Leary was elected to the North Carolina General Assembly of 1868-1869 House of Representatives from Cumberland County. He was reelected to a second term in 1870. As legislator he voted with the minority against fraudulent bonds. In 1871 he entered the law department of Howard University in Washington, D.C., where he graduated with a LL. B. in 1873 in a class with Joseph E. Lee, Jacksonville, Florida's first black lawyer; Henry Wagner, US Consul at Lyon, France; Durham Stevens, who was a diplomat and was assassinated while working for Japan's Ministry of Foreign Affairs; and William E. Matthews, J. H. Smith, and John A. Moss.

After graduation, he was admitted to practice in North Carolina Courts in May 1873, making him Fayetteville's first black lawyer and North Carolina's second black lawyer. Leary later helped establish the law school at Shaw University and served as its dean starting in March 1890. He was followed as dean by Edward A. Johnson, who was Shaw's first graduate and later the first African-American member of the New York State Assembly.

After his time in the state legislature, Leary was very active in politics. He was alderman in Fayetteville in 1876–1877. He was a delegate to every State Republican Convention in North Carolina from 1867 to 1894. He was an alternate delegate to the 1880 Republican National Convention and a delegate to the 1884 Republican National Convention, both in Chicago. May 1, 1881, he was appointed United States deputy collector for the fourth district of North Carolina, Internal Revenue Department, holding the position for four years until the start of Grover Cleveland's presidential administration. In 1890 he was a candidate for congress on the Republican Ticket in Fayetteville, losing the race to Benjamin F. Grady.

Leary was also associated with many important social and civil rights groups in North Carolina. He was a prominent member of the Statewide Convention of Colored People in Goldsboro on March 29, 1882. He was president of the North Carolina Industrial Association, a labor organization, in the early 1880s. He was a member of the Odd Fellows and an honorary commissioner from North Carolina to the 1884 World's Fair in New Orleans. He was a member of the Protestant Episcopal Church.

In 1892 he moved to Charlotte, becoming that city's first black lawyer, where he continued to practice until his death. Later in his life he was disappointed in a number of attempts to obtain higher appointed offices. In 1892, the Raleigh Signal suggested Leary as a candidate for state Attorney-General. In 1901 he was endorsed by Rev. D. C. Covington in The Colored American for the position of federal judge of the Philippines. In 1896 he was key in supporting Daniel Russell's successful run for Governor of North Carolina and desired the position of assistant U.S. district-attorney as a reward.

== Family and death ==
He married twice. His first wife was Alice B. Thomas of Raleigh, North Carolina. She died October 13, 1880. They had two children, both of whom died young. His second wife was Nannie E. Latham of Charlotte, North Carolina. They married July 14, 1886.

Leary died December 9, 1904, in Charlotte. His funeral was held at St. Michael's and All Angels' Episcopal church.

== See also ==
- African American officeholders from the end of the Civil War until before 1900

== Works cited ==
- Huddle, Mark Andrew (April 1997). "To Educate a Race: The Making of the First State Colored Normal School, Fayetteville, North Carolina, 1865-1877". The North Carolina Historical Review. 74 (2): 135–160. JSTOR 23521221.
