= Constitutional Union Guard =

White supremacist organization

Constitutional Union Guard (C.U.G.) was a white supremacist organization in the United States. It was one of several loosely organized groups established to promote and restore white supremacy in North Carolina during the Reconstruction era. The group was discussed at the impeachment trial of North Carolina governor William W. Holden in the North Carolina House of Representatives. According to testimony given by a man who identified as a member, the group was dedicated to restoring the U.S. to abide by its constitution before the 14th and 15th amendments. It was organized along with other white supremacist groups including the Ku Klux Klan (also referred to as the Invisible Empire) and White Brotherhood to counter Union League activities. It was opposed to Reconstruction era programs.

In Lenoir County it was established in 1869. The Regulators was a predecessor group.

Contemporary accounts and a 1919 history of North Carolina treat the Ku Klux Klan, White Brotherhood, Invisible Empire, and Constitutional Union Guard as distinct but kindred groups that employed similar means. More recent accounts have grouped them all as Ku Klux Klan organizations. The groups as well as the Pale Faces attacked and terrorized white and blacks who did not submit to a "conservative white governing structure". Mark Bradley describes the group names as being regional.
