= Isham Sweat =

Post Civil War legislator in North Carolina

Isham Sweat was a state legislator in North Carolina. He served in the North Carolina House of Representatives representing Cumberland County.

He was born in North Carolina. He was described as "mulatto".

He lived in Fayetteville. He was part of the colored convention held in Raleigh in 1865.

He was a barber.

== See also ==
- African American officeholders from the end of the Civil War until before 1900
