= Henry C. Cherry =

North Carolina politician (c.1836–1885)

North Carolina House of Representatives
- In office 1868–1870

Personal details
- Born: c. 1836 Beaufort County, North Carolina, United States
- Died: July 11, 1885 Tarboro, North Carolina
- Party: Republican

Henry C. Cherry (circa 1836 – July 11, 1885) was an American politician. Born enslaved in North Carolina, he eventually was freed and moved to Edgecombe County where he worked as a carpenter and merchant. He served as a delegate in North Carolina's 1868 constitutional convention and served in the North Carolina House of Representatives from 1868 to 1870.

== Early life ==
Henry C. Cherry was born enslaved in Beaufort County, North Carolina, United States circa 1836. He was a mulatto. Little is known about his early life. By 1860, he was living as a free man in Edgecombe County, North Carolina. He worked as a carpenter and merchant and married Mary Ann Jones, a free woman, in March 1861. He had eight children with her. One of his daughters married U.S. Representative Henry P. Cheatham, another U.S. Representative George Henry White, and a third State Representative Eustace Edward Green.

== Political career ==
Cherry was one of 13 black men elected to participate in North Carolina's 1868 constitutional convention. He represented Edgecombe County. He served on the convention's Committee on Suffrage and Eligibility to Office.

Cherry was one of 17 colored men elected to the North Carolina House of Representatives in 1868. During his term, he served on the Committee on Penal Institutions. In the second sitting of the 1869 legislature, he served on the Claims Committee and the General Assembly's Joint Committee on Finance. He left office in 1870. Out of office he remained an influential powerbroker in black Republican politics. He supported efforts to establish the Tarboro Colored Institute for black children in 1869. In 1883, he served on Edgecombe County's board for black public schools.

== Later life ==
In the 1880s Cherry joined the Fulton Fire Company, a volunteer fire department. He died of typhoid fever in Tarboro on July 11, 1885 at 48 years of age. A funeral for him was held the following day.

== See also ==
- African American officeholders from the end of the Civil War until before 1900

== Works cited ==
- Balanoff, Elizabeth (January 1972). "Negro Legislators in the North Carolina General Assembly, July, 1868-February, 1872". The North Carolina Historical Review. 49 (1): 22–55. JSTOR 23529002.
- Bernstein, Leonard (October 1949). "The Participation of Negro Delegates in the Constitutional Convention of 1868 in North Carolina". The Journal of Negro History. 34 (4): 391–409. doi:10.2307/2715607. JSTOR 2715607.
- Gates, Henry Louis, Jr.; Higginbotham, Evelyn Brooks, eds. (2008). The African American National Biography. Vol. 2. Oxford University Press. ISBN 9780195160192.
- Justesen, Benjamin R. (July 2009). "'The Class of '83': Black Watershed in the North Carolina General Assembly". The North Carolina Historical Review. 86 (3): 282–308. ISSN 0029-2494. JSTOR 23523861.
- Justesen, Benjamin R. (2012). George Henry White: An Even Chance in the Race of Life (reprint ed.). Baton Rouge: Louisiana State University Press. ISBN 9780807144770.
- Kenzer, Robert C. (1997). Enterprising Southerners: Black Economic Success in North Carolina, 1865-1915. University of Virginia Press. ISBN 9780813917337.
