= O. S. Hayes =

American politician (1843–1910)

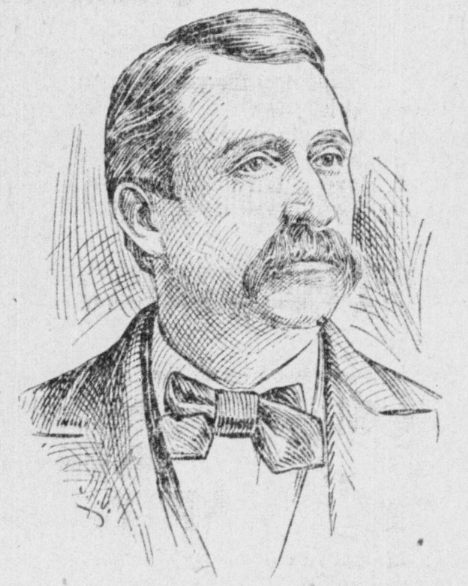
Hayes c. 1898

Orlen Strong Hayes (January 26, 1843 – April 27, 1910) was an American politician. Born and raised in Ohio, he served in federal infantry regiments during the American Civil War. Following the conflict he moved to Shoe Heel in Robeson County, North Carolina and opened a store. Hayes also joined the Republican Party and was an active member of it throughout the Reconstruction era, serving as a delegate to the state's constitutional convention of 1868 and in the North Carolina Senate and the North Carolina House of Representatives. In 1890s he moved to Statham, Georgia, where he married, edited a newspaper, and became leader of an Ohio colony of Northern migrants. He died in Winder, Georgia in 1910.

== Early life ==
Orlen Strong Hayes was born on January 26, 1843 in Loudonville, Ohio, United States. While still young, he moved with his father to Toledo, where he received his education.

Hayes joined the 100th Ohio Infantry Regiment and served as a sergeant in Company E until he was promoted to the rank of first lieutenant on December 22, 1863, taking on the role of adjutant in Company A of the 128th Ohio Infantry Regiment. He was promoted to the rank of captain on June 29, 1865 and mustered out of service on July 13.

== Career ==
Following the end of the war, Hayes moved to Shoe Heel in Robeson County, North Carolina and opened a mercantile business. He also worked as a farmer and turpentine producer.

Hayes joined the Republican Party and was an active member of it throughout the Reconstruction era. He served as a Republican delegate to the state's constitutional convention of 1868. He also served in the North Carolina Senate from 1868 to 1870, representing the 15th district. During that time he was a member of a committee to investigate the bankruptcy of the Bank of North Carolina. He served in the North Carolina House of Representatives in 1883.

In May 1891, a fire in Maxton's business district destroyed Hayes' store. He moved into a new shop in June.

== Later life ==
By 1895, Hayes had moved to Statham, Georgia. He promoted the Northern immigration to Southern states championed by the Seaboard Air-Line System railroads, working as an agent of the Seaboard Air Line Industrial Association and managing an "Ohio colony" in Statham. He married Laura Lee Bush of Winder in July 1895. They had three daughters together. In Statham, he edited a weekly newspaper, the Southern News. In 1908, Governor Hoke Smith appointed Hayes as a notary public. He later moved to Winder, dying there on April 27, 1910.

== Works cited ==
- Cheney, John L. Jr., ed. (1981). North Carolina Government, 1585-1979: A Narrative and Statistical History (revised ed.). Raleigh: North Carolina Secretary of State. OCLC 1290270510.
- Evans, William McKee (1995). Ballots and Fence Rails: Reconstruction on the Lower Cape Fear (reprint ed.). Athens: University of Georgia Press. ISBN 0-8203-1731-4.
- Johnson, Crisfield, ed. (1879). History of Cuyahoga County, Ohio. Cleveland: D. W. Ensign & Company.
- Official Roster of the Soldiers of the State of Ohio in the War of the Rebellion, 1861-1866. Vol. II. Cincinnati: Ohio General Assembly. 1888.
- Raper, Horace W. (1985). William W. Holden: North Carolina's Political Enigma. Chapel Hill: University of North Carolina Press. ISBN 0807850608.
- Tomlinson, J. S. (1883). Assembly Sketch Book, Session 1883. North Carolina. Vol. 2. Raleigh: Edwards, Broughton & Co., Steam Printers and Binders.
