= W. H. S. Sweet =

American politician, farmer (1838–1890)

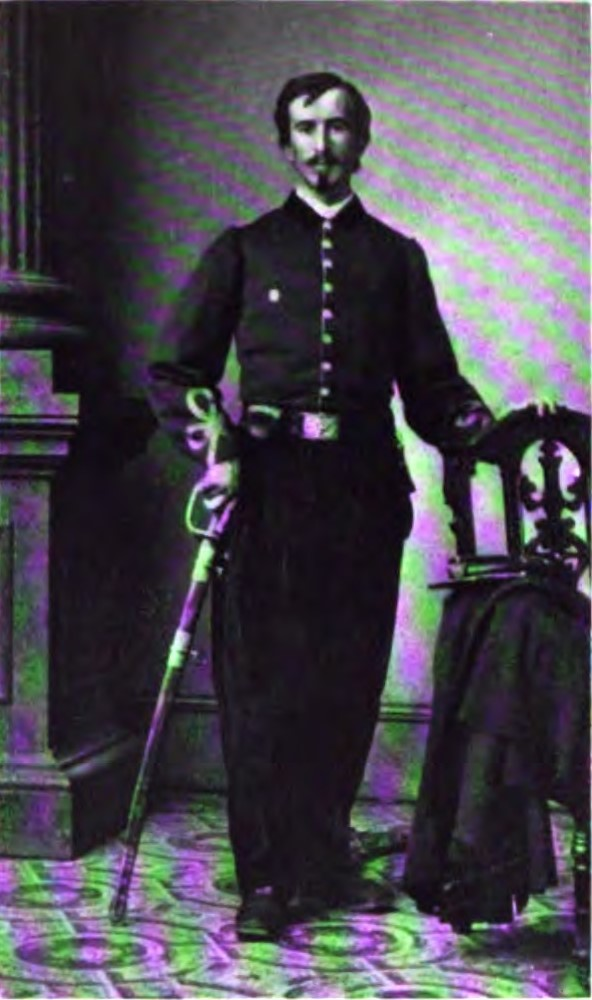
- Sweet in military uniform

Member of the North Carolina Senate from the 10th District
- In office 1868–1870

Personal details
- Born: September 20, 1838 Marcy, New York, U.S.
- Died: August 30, 1890 (aged 51) Marcy, New York,
- Party: Republican

Military service
- Branch/service: U.S. Army

William Henry Seward Sweet (September 20, 1838 – August 30, 1890) was an American soldier, politician, and farmer. Born in New York and educated to be a lawyer, he joined the U.S. Army following the outbreak of the American Civil War. Rising to the rank of brevet captain, he moved to North Carolina after the conflict's conclusion and served in the North Carolina Senate. After working as a contractor in Alabama, he returned to his hometown in New York and engaged in farming until his death.

== Early life ==
W. H. S. Sweet was born on September 20, 1838 in Marcy, New York. He came from a farming family, and his father was active in local politics, at one point serving in the New York State Assembly. He was educated in local schools and the Utica Free Academy. He then attended Yale University and the Albany Law School and was admitted to the New York bar in 1861. He subsequently established a law practice in Utica.

== Military service ==
Following the outbreak of the American Civil War, he enlisted in the 146th New York Infantry Regiment, U.S. Army. on September 6, 1862 and was mustered into service as a first sergeant of Company F on October 10. On January 7, 1863, he was made a first lieutenant and moved to Company B three days later. He was transferred back to Company F on January 24, 1864. He was captured by Confederate forces at the Battle of the Wilderness on May 5, 1864. While imprisoned he was awarded the rank of brevet captain. He was released from captivity on May 6, 1865 and was mustered out with his company on July 16, 1865 at Washington D. C..

== Postwar activities ==
Following the end of the war, Sweet moved to New Bern, North Carolina and worked in the turpentine industry. He sold his interest in the New Berne Turpentine Company in 1869. A member of the Republican Party, he served as a delegate to the state 1868 constitutional convention, representing Craven County. He delivered stump speeches in support of Ulysses S. Grant during the 1868 presidential election.

Sweet was elected to the North Carolina Senate in 1868, serving in its 10th district seat from then until 1870. During the course of his tenure, Sweet moved an official resolution accusing State Treasurer David A. Jenkins of malfeasance. As a result, a joint legislative committee was established. Conspirators of the state's "Railroad Ring" feared that the inquiry would expose their corrupt dealings with the state's railway bonds. Fearing this, lobbyist Milton S. Littlefield saw to it that a witness Sweet had expected to testify was not in Raleigh when the committee convened. As a result, Sweet's accusations were not substantiated, and the investigation concluded Jenkins had acted with propriety. As a result, a censure effort against Sweet was initiated but failed, and The North Carolina Standard called for his expulsion from the Senate for besmirching the body and undermining the credibility of the state. He also lodged charges of corruption in the purchasing of a site for the construction of the state penitentiary.

Sweet later moved to Alabama and worked as a contractor building railways before eventually returned to his family farm in Marcy and engaged in farming. He married Emily J. Richardson in 1869 and had four children with her. Beset with ill health, he committed suicide by chloroform poisoning in Marcy on August 30, 1890.

== Works cited ==
- Brainard, Mary Genevie Green, ed. (1915). Campaigns of the One Hundred and Forty-Sixth Regiment, New York State Volunteers, Also Known as Halleck's infantry, the Fifth Oneida, and Garrard's Tigers. New York: G. P. Putnam's Sons. LCCN 15009847.
- Cheney, John L. Jr., ed. (1981). North Carolina Government, 1585-1979: A Narrative and Statistical History (revised ed.). Raleigh: North Carolina Secretary of State. OCLC 1290270510.
- History of Oneida County, New York. Vol. 2. Chicago: S. J. Clarke Publishing Company. 1912.
- Leach, Orlando, ed. (1906). Biographical Record : Class of Sixty, 1860-1906. Boston: Yale University Class of 1860.
- Raper, Horace W. (1985). William W. Holden: North Carolina's Political Enigma. Chapel Hill: University of North Carolina Press. ISBN 0807850608.
- Taylor, Gregory S. (2021). Central Prison : A History of North Carolina's State Penitentiary. Baton Rouge: Louisiana State University Press. ISBN 9780807174876.
- Watson, Alan D. (1987). A History of New Bern and Craven County. New Bern: Tryon Palace Commission. OCLC 17398679.
