= William Cawthorn =

American politician

William Cawthorn was a state legislator in North Carolina. He served in the North Carolina House of Representatives. He represented Warren County, North Carolina. He served two terms from 1868 to 1872.

He lived in Warrenton, North Carolina and worked as a cobbler and scrap metal collector. He attended the Freedmen's Convention held in Raleigh in October 1865 and was elected its assistant secretary. He attended a following convention in Raleigh in October 1866 and was appointed by the body to serve as secretary of the new Freedmen Educational Association. U.S. Marshal for North Carolina Daniel R. Goodloe attempted to make Cawthorn the first colored man to serve on a jury in North Carolina during the Reconstruction era by issuing him a summons for U.S. District Court business in 1867. Cawthorn ultimately did not qualify according to the District Court's local rules because he lacked freeholder status and the distinction instead went to Hanson Truman Hughes.

He was the only Republican in the House of Representatives to vote in December 1870 in favor of impeaching Governor William Woods Holden.

== See also ==
- North Carolina General Assembly of 1868–1869
- African American officeholders from the end of the Civil War until before 1900

== Works cited ==
- Balanoff, Elizabeth (January 1972). "Negro Legislators in the North Carolina General Assembly, July, 1868-February, 1872". The North Carolina Historical Review. 49 (1): 22–55. JSTOR 23529002.
- Bishir, Catherine W. (2013). Crafting Lives : African American Artisans in New Bern, North Carolina, 1770-1900. Chapel Hill: The University of North Carolina Press. ISBN 9781469608761.
- Frampton, Thomas Ward (May 2024). "The First Black Jurors and the Integration of the American Jury" (PDF). New York University Law Review. 99 (2): 515–577.
- Raper, Horace W. (1985). William W. Holden: North Carolina's Political Enigma. Chapel Hill: University of North Carolina Press. ISBN 0807850608.
