= John S. W. Eagles =

American policeman and politician

Member of the North Carolina House of Representatives from New Hanover County
- In office November 16, 1869 – 1870
- Preceded by: Llewellyn Garrish Estes

Personal details
- Born: circa 1843/1844 North Carolina
- Died: July 17, 1901
- Resting place: Wilmington National Cemetery
- Party: Republican

John S. W. Eagles (circa 1843/1844 – July 17, 1901) was an American politician and soldier. Born in North Carolina, he served in the 37th United States Colored Infantry Regiment during the American Civil War. Following the end of the war, Eagles moved to Wilmington and worked as a carpenter. Active in Republican politics, he represented New Hanover County in the North Carolina House of Representatives from 1869 to 1870. In his later life, Eagles was served in militia units and was an active member of the Grand Army of the Republic.

== Early life ==
John S. W. Eagles was born around 1843 or 1844 in North Carolina. He served as a first sergeant in the 37th United States Colored Infantry Regiment during the American Civil War. He was wounded in the arm at the Battle of the Crater by a bayonet.

Following the end of the war, Eagles moved to Wilmington, North Carolina. He worked as a carpenter and served as a foreman of the Cape Fear Steam Engine Company, an all-black firefighting organization. He married Maggie Loftin on May 11, 1866. A son, John Eagles, graduated from the Leonard School of Pharmacy at Shaw University in Raleigh and established a drugstore there.

== Political career ==
Eagles helped establish the Republican Party in New Hanover County and served as a registrar and election judge. On August 11, 1868, the Wilmington City Board of Alderman created a 36-man police force and appointed Eagles a sergeant. He also served as a deputy sheriff.

Eagles was elected to the North Carolina House of Representatives for a seat representing New Hanover County in August 1869 to fill a vacancy created by the resignation of Llewellyn Garrish Estes. Seated on November 16, he served from then until 1870. He was one of 13 colored men to serve that legislative term. In the legislature's second session, lasting from November 1869 to April 1870, he served on the Committee on Privileges and Elections. In 1870, Eagles and several other New Hanover Republicans dissented from their party's county nominating convention and he stood again as an independent candidate for a seat in the House but was unsuccessful. He attempted another candidacy in 1876. He supported the nomination of Daniel Lindsay Russell as the Republican candidate in the 1896 North Carolina gubernatorial election.

== Later life ==
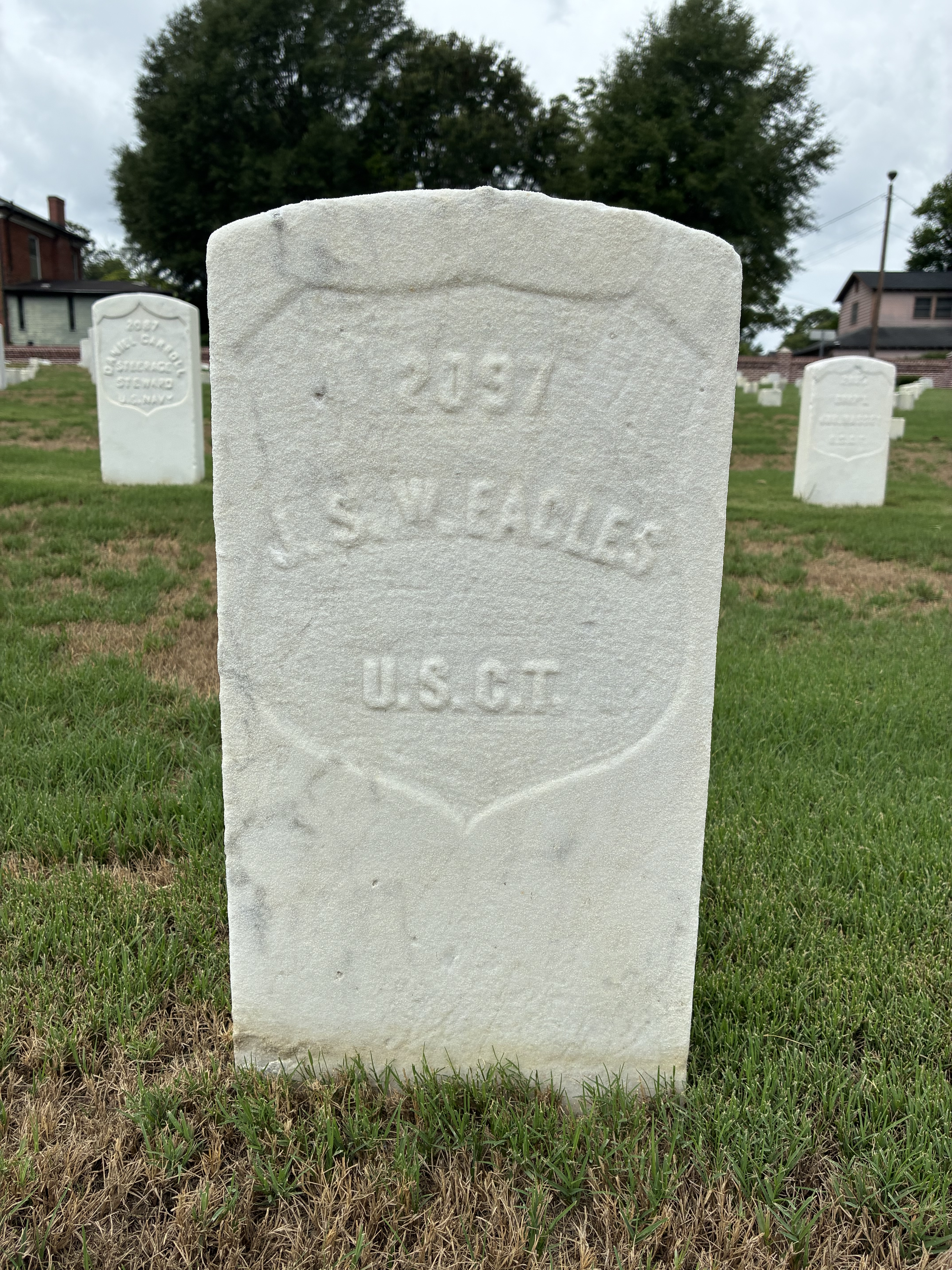
Headstone of Eagles at Wilmington National Cemetery

In the 1870s Eagles served as a captain in the Wilmington Rifle Guards, a state militia unit. In March 1876, Governor Curtis Hooks Brogden organized various Wilmington military units as a new volunteer militia regiment and appointed him as one of its colonels. He later organized a group of black volunteers during the Spanish–American War.

In January 1884 Eagles was elected a vice-president of the Discharged Union Soldiers Association. The association was later absorbed by the Grand Army of the Republic. That year, Eagles told fellow veterans, "Why are over 50,000 colored soldiers laying beneath the sod today? Why are their bones bleaching in the dust tonight? For the privileges we are enjoying today. Civil rights, political rights, soldiers’ and sailors’ rights, and religious rights; and we propose to protect those rights, let come what will or may." He became the first black man to serve as commander of the Joseph C. Abbott Post 15 of the Grand Army, and in that capacity was involved in various Memorial Day commemorations. He was appointed as an enumerator for Wilmington for the 1890 United States census.

Eagles died July 17, 1901. He was buried in the Wilmington National Cemetery three days later.

== See also ==
- African American officeholders from the end of the Civil War until before 1900

== Works cited ==
- Balanoff, Elizabeth (January 1972). "Negro Legislators in the North Carolina General Assembly, July, 1868-February, 1872". The North Carolina Historical Review. 49 (1): 22–55. JSTOR 23529002.
- Cheney, John L. Jr., ed. (1981). North Carolina Government, 1585-1979: A Narrative and Statistical History (revised ed.). Raleigh: North Carolina Secretary of State. OCLC 1290270510.
- Foner, Eric (1996). Freedom's Lawmakers: A Directory of Black Officeholders During Reconstruction (second ed.). Louisiana State University Press. ISBN 978-0-8071-2082-8.
- Reaves, William M. (1998). Strength Through Struggle: The Chronological and Historical Record of the African-American Community in Wilmington, North Carolina, 1865-1950. New Hanover Public Library. ISBN 9780967041001.
- Reid, Richard M. (2008). Freedom for Themselves: North Carolina's Black Soldiers in the Civil War Era. Chapel Hill, North Carolina: University of North Carolina Press. ISBN 0-8078-3174-3.
