= Cuffee Mayo =

American minister, laborer and politician (1803–1896)

Cuffee Mayo, sometimes spelled Cuffie Mayo, (1803 – January 14, 1896) was a minister, laborer, and politician in North Carolina. He was a Republican.

== Early life ==
Cuffee Mayo was born free in Virginia in 1803. His family moved to Warren County, North Carolina by 1808 and settled in Granville County by 1840. He worked as a blacksmith and a minister.

== Political career ==
Mayo was one of 13 colored delegates elected to the 1868 North Carolina constitutional convention. He served on the body's Committee on Legislature. During its proceedings he voted in support of making superior court judges subject to popular election and opposed the inclusion of a loyalty oath for prospective voter registrants to federal laws and the U.S. Constitution in the hopes of letting "more become eligible" to vote.

Mayo was one of 17 colored men elected to the North Carolina House of Representatives in 1868, representing Granville County in that body for a term from 1868 to 1870. In both the first and second sessions of the 1868 legislature he served on the Committee on Claims. In a March 1869 debate he opposed the re-enfranchisement of Confederate veterans, citing the opposition of many of them to the state legislature and to the U.S. Congress. He participated in the Republican Party's Granville County convention in July 1876.

== Later life ==
Mayo died on January 14, 1896 at his home outside of Oxford.

== Works cited ==
- Balanoff, Elizabeth (January 1972). "Negro Legislators in the North Carolina General Assembly, July, 1868-February, 1872". The North Carolina Historical Review. 49 (1): 22–55. JSTOR 23529002.
- Bernstein, Leonard (October 1949). "The Participation of Negro Delegates in the Constitutional Convention of 1868 in North Carolina". The Journal of Negro History. 34 (4): 391–409. JSTOR 2715607.
