= Llewellyn Garrish Estes =

American Civil War Medal of Honor recipient (1843–1905)

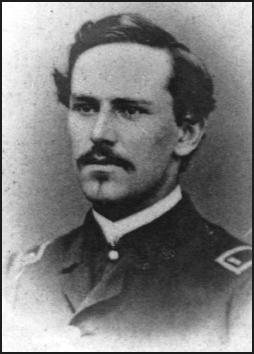
- Born: December 27, 1843; Old Town, Maine, U.S.
- Died: February 21, 1905 (aged 61); Washington, D.C., U.S.
- Burial place: Arlington National Cemetery
- Military career
- Allegiance: United States
- Branch: Union Army
- Service years: 1861–1865
- Rank: Bvt. Brigadier General
- Unit: 1st Maine Volunteer Cavalry Regiment
- Conflicts: American Civil War; Savannah campaign
- Awards: Medal of Honor

Llewellyn Garrish Estes (December 27, 1843 – February 21, 1905) was an American soldier who fought in the Civil War. Estes received the United States' highest award for bravery during combat, the Medal of Honor, for his action at Flint River in Georgia on August 30, 1864. He was honored with the award on August 29, 1894.

== Biography ==
Estes was born in Old Town, Maine on December 27, 1843. He joined the 1st Maine Volunteer Cavalry Regiment as a first sergeant in October 1861, and was commissioned as first lieutenant in March 1862. In May 1863, while serving on the staff of Maj. Gen. H. J. Kilpatrick, he was captured carrying a message to General Joseph Hooker. While part of a group of prisoners being escorted to Richmond, Virginia, they managed to overpower their captors during the night and instead returned with their Confederate prisoners to the Union lines.

Estes was promoted to captain in August 1863 and was appointed as assistant adjutant general the next month. Assigned with Kilpatrick's cavalry to Sherman's March to the Sea, he was commended by Generals Sherman and Kilpatrick for his skill in leading small raiding parties in Georgia. Part of the advance party that reached the Atlantic coast, Estes was the first to contact the Union naval forces waiting offshore. By the time he mustered out in September 1865 at the age of 21, he was a major, and had received a brevet promotion to brigadier general.

Estes subsequently served in the North Carolina House of Representatives, representing New Hanover County. He resigned in July 1869. The vacancy spawned significant disputes in the local Republican Party before John S. W. Eagles won the seat in an August special election.

After contracting pneumonia, he died from heart failure at his home in Washington, D.C. on February 21, 1905, and his remains are interred at the Arlington National Cemetery in Virginia.

== Medal of Honor citation ==
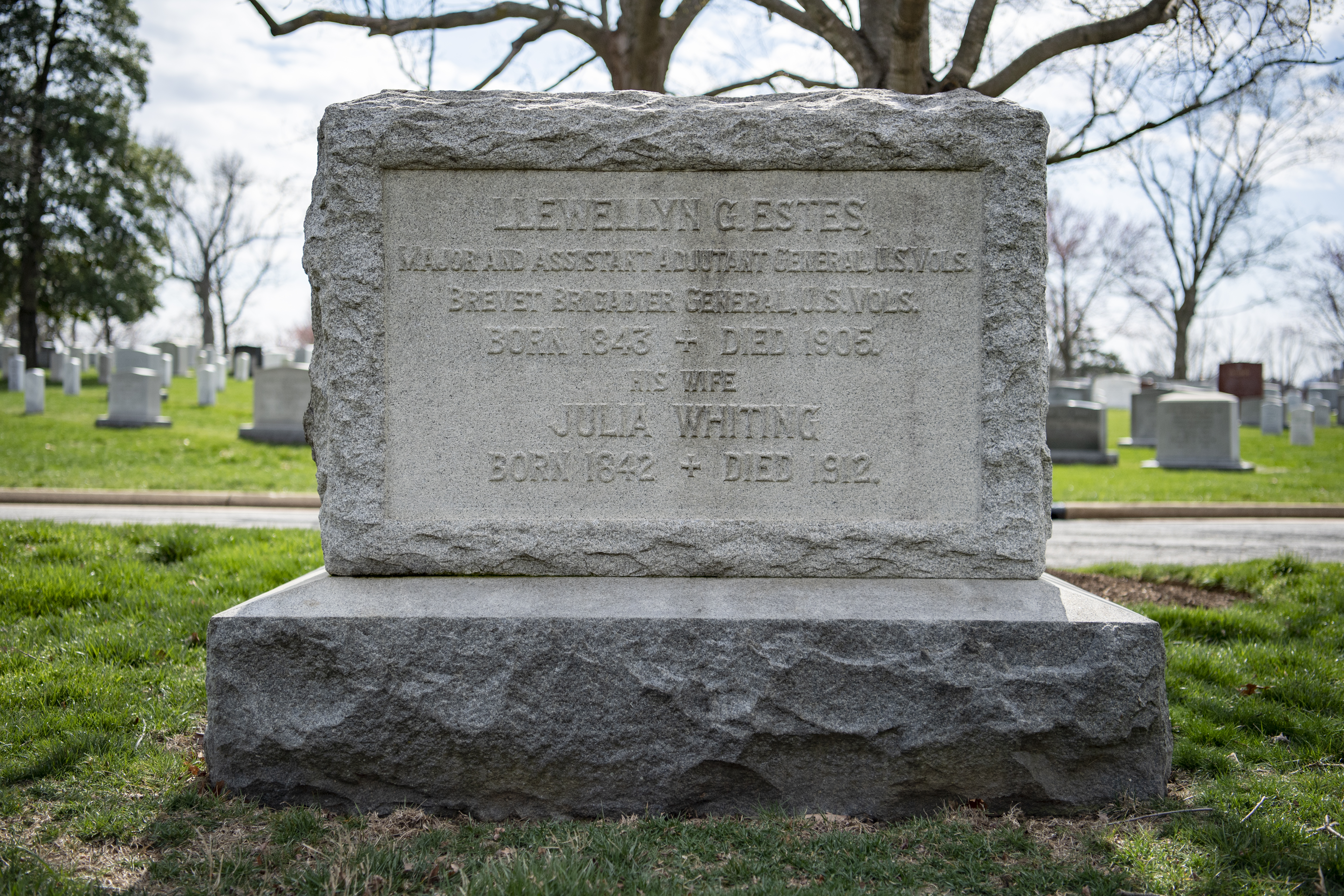
Grave at Arlington National Cemetery

His Medal of Honor action occurred while serving with the 92nd Illinois Volunteer Infantry.

The President of the United States of America, in the name of Congress, takes pleasure in presenting the Medal of Honor to Captain & Assistant Adjutant General Llewellyn Garrish Estes, United States Army, for extraordinary heroism on 30 August 1864, while serving with U.S. Volunteers, in action at Flint River, Georgia. Captain Estes voluntarily led troops in a charge over a burning bridge. (Note: Citation misspelled first name as "Lewellyn".)

== See also ==
- List of American Civil War Medal of Honor recipients: A–F

== Sources ==
- Dyer, Frederick Henry (1908). A Compendium of the War of the Rebellion (PDF). Des Moines, IA: Dyer Pub. Co. pp. 1254–1255. ASIN B01BUFJ76Q. This article incorporates text from this source, which is in the public domain.
- Evans, William McKee (1995). Ballots and Fence Rails: Reconstruction on the Lower Cape Fear (reprint ed.). Athens: University of Georgia Press. ISBN 0-8203-1731-4.
- Federal Publishing Company (1908). Military Affairs and Regimental Histories of Maine, New Hampshire, Vermont, Massachusetts, Rhode Island, Connecticut, Pennsylvania, And Delaware (PDF). The Union Army: A History of Military Affairs in the Loyal States, 1861–65 – Records of the Regiments in the Union army – Cyclopedia of battles – Memoirs of Commanders and Soldiers. Vol. I. Madison, WI: Federal Publishing Company. p. 555. OCLC 694018100. This article incorporates text from this source, which is in the public domain.
- Hodsdon, John L (1867). Annual report of the Adjutant General of the State of Maine, 1861–1866 (PDF). Augusta, ME: Stevens & Sayward. p. 1346. OCLC 866320784. This article incorporates text from this source, which is in the public domain.
- Merrill, Samuel Hill (1866). The Campaigns of the First Maine and First District of Columbia Cavalry (PDF). Portland, ME: Bailey & Noyes. p. 436. OCLC 1041622265. This article incorporates text from this source, which is in the public domain.
- Tobie, Edward Parsons Jr (1887). History of the First Maine Cavalry 1861–1865 (PDF). Boston, MA: The First Maine Cavalry Association. p. 735. OCLC 02013163. This article incorporates text from this source, which is in the public domain.
- History, U.S. Army Center of Military (2013). "Civil War (A-F) Medal of Honor Recipients". history.army.mil. Archived from the original on September 17, 2013.
- "Lewellyn Estes". Military Medals Database. 2005.
- "Died: Estes". The Evening Star. Washington, D.C. February 22, 1905. p. 5 – via Newspapers.com.
