= Ivey Hutchings =

Reconstruction Era American politician

Ivey Hutchings was an African-American politician and state legislator in North Carolina. He was one of three representatives for Halifax County, North Carolina in 1868. He served in the Committee on Corporations.

== Career ==
Hutchings was one of 17 "colored" men elected to the North Carolina House of Representatives in 1868. During his term, he served on the House's Committee on Corporations and Committee on Engrossed Bills. In February 1869 he proposed a bill to prohibit the distillation of grain into alcohol. The measure was unsuccessful.

== See also ==
- African American officeholders from the end of the Civil War until before 1900

== Works cited ==
- Balanoff, Elizabeth (January 1972). "Negro Legislators in the North Carolina General Assembly, July, 1868-February, 1872". The North Carolina Historical Review. 49 (1): 22–55. JSTOR 23529002.
