= James Harris (North Carolina politician) =

American politician (c.1832–1891)

James Henry Harris (c. 1832–1891) was an American upholsterer and politician. Born into slavery, he was freed as a young adult and worked as a carpenter's apprentice and worker before attending Oberlin College in Ohio. For a time, he lived in Chatham, Ontario, where he was a member of the Chatham Vigilance Committee that aimed to prevent blacks being transported out of Canada and sold as slaves in the United States.

During the American Civil War (1861–1865), he was commissioned to organize black troops in Indiana for the 28th United States Colored Infantry Regiment. After the war, he was an educator and politician in North Carolina.

Harris was Raleigh, North Carolina's first African American politician. He became a political leader, helping to found the North Carolina Republican Party, serving as a Raleigh alderman, president of the State Equal Rights League (National Equal Rights League), vice president of the Union League, and chairman of the 1866 Freedmen's Convention. He was elected as a delegate to the state's 1868 constitutional convention, as a member of the North Carolina House of Representatives (1868–1870, and 1883) and of the North Carolina Senate (1872–1874).

== Early life ==
In 1830 or 1832, Harris was born into slavery, with both black and white heritage, in Granville County, North Carolina. On August 3, 1840 he began an apprenticeship with Charles Allen to learn to be a carpenter. Later, he was a self-employed carpenter or upholsterer in Raleigh, North Carolina. He became free at 18 years of age. A certificate of his freedom was issued by the Granville County Clerk's office in 1848.

Harris left the state and attended Oberlin College in Ohio for two years. He moved to Chatham, Ontario, in the 1850s. Later in the decade he became involved in anti-slavery activities and joined the Chatham Vigilance Committee, which was established by black abolitionists. Its objective was to prevent people from being kidnapped from Canada and returned or sold into slavery in the United States. Some of the members of the group were graduates of Oberlin College in Ohio. In 1858, he was appointed to serve as the National Emigration Convention's agent in Chatham. In 1862, he traveled to Sierra Leone Colony and Protectorate and the Colony of Liberia. He supported the exploration of the Niger Valley by Martin Delany. After falling ill, Harris returned to Oberlin. Discovering that his wife's family had relocated to Terre Haute, Indiana in his absence, he quickly moved there to join them.

== Civil War activity ==
After the outbreak of the American Civil War, Harris was commissioned in 1863 by Governor Morton as a recruiting officer to organize black troops in Indiana, including the 28th United States Colored Infantry Regiment.

After the end of the war, Harris returned to Raleigh, North Carolina. Having received a teaching certificate from the New England Freedmen's Aid Society, he worked for them as a teacher in Raleigh beginning in June 1865.

== Political career ==
=== Equal Rights League activities ===
Harris launched his political career in 1865 and remained active in North Carolina affairs through the 1880s. His political career started at the National Equal Rights Convention of 1865, when he was the event's vice-president.

On August 22, 1865 an assembly of colored people in New Bern issued a public call for the holding of statewide freedmen's convention in Raleigh. The freedmen's convention convened at Loyal African Methodist Episcopal Church in Raleigh on September 29, three days before the start of the state's official constitutional convention. Harris attended as a part of a Wake County delegation. Unlike many of the eastern delegates who had been elected by assemblies to represent the interests of blacks in their home regions, many delegates from North Carolina's interior had chosen to attend the convention on their own initiative. A compromise between these delegates was reached in favor of being inclusive of as many attendees as possible. On the convention's second day, Harris introduced a successful motion such that the congress declared itself a "mass convention" open to all delegates who arrived in good faith. The interior delegates and the convention as a whole tended to seek a conciliatory posture towards white society.

Among various resolutions adopted by the body was one to establish a committee led by Harris to draft a letter to the state constitutional convention representing the freedmen's views on equality. The letter assumed a conservative and deferential tone and focused on appeals for economic relief, making only a vague appeal for the undoing of discriminatory legislation and omitting mentions of suffrage or full legal equality. The convention designated Harris, John R. Good, and Abraham Galloway as messengers to deliver the letter to the constitutional convention and invite Governor William Woods Holden to speak before them. Holden declined the invitation. The delegates' final act was to declare themselves a new North Carolina Equal Rights League headquartered in Raleigh, supplanting the original one created a year prior in New Bern, and made Harris their president.

Harris subsequently attended the state constitutional convention as a spectator. The convention largely ignored the entreaties of the freedmen, though its framed constitution failed ratification in 1866. Presidential Reconstruction under Andrew Johnson left the political role of blacks to the discretion of the governments of the Southern states. In 1866, Conservatives (Note: The grouping known as the "Conservative Party" in North Carolina referred to a coalition of former Whigs and Democrats who opposed Republicans during the Reconstruction era. They officially reorganized as the North Carolina Democratic Party in 1876.) in the North Carolina General Assembly voted against ratifying the Fourteenth Amendment to the U.S. Constitution—which would have guaranteed full citizenship and due process to former slaves—and passed a series of Black Codes which restricted the legal and economic rights of freedmen.

On October 2, 1866, the North Carolina Equal Rights League opened its convention at the Loyal African Methodist Episcopal Church in Raleigh and elected Harris to preside over the meeting. The delegates voted to invite "distinguished [white] citizens of North Carolina" to speak before their assembly, and in his capacity as the presiding officer, Harris reached out to Governor Jonathan Worth, Conservative Party leader William Alexander Graham, attorney Bartholomew F. Moore, and journalist William Pell. The convention reelected Harris to the presidency of the North Carolina Equal Rights League for a one-year term.

=== Union League and creation of the North Carolina Republican Party ===
In late 1866 and early 1867 black held mass meetings in Raleigh and High Point to select delegates to attend the "National Colored Loyal League" convention in Washington D. C., scheduled to open on January 10, 1867. Harris was made a delegate and was made deputy president of the convention. While in Washington, he met with Congressional Republicans and with President Johnson. He advised the president that freedmen "will never be fully guaranteed in their rights as citizens without the power to vote." He was appointed a deputy member of the Grand National Council of the Union League of America on January 13, 1867 and returned to Raleigh several weeks later.

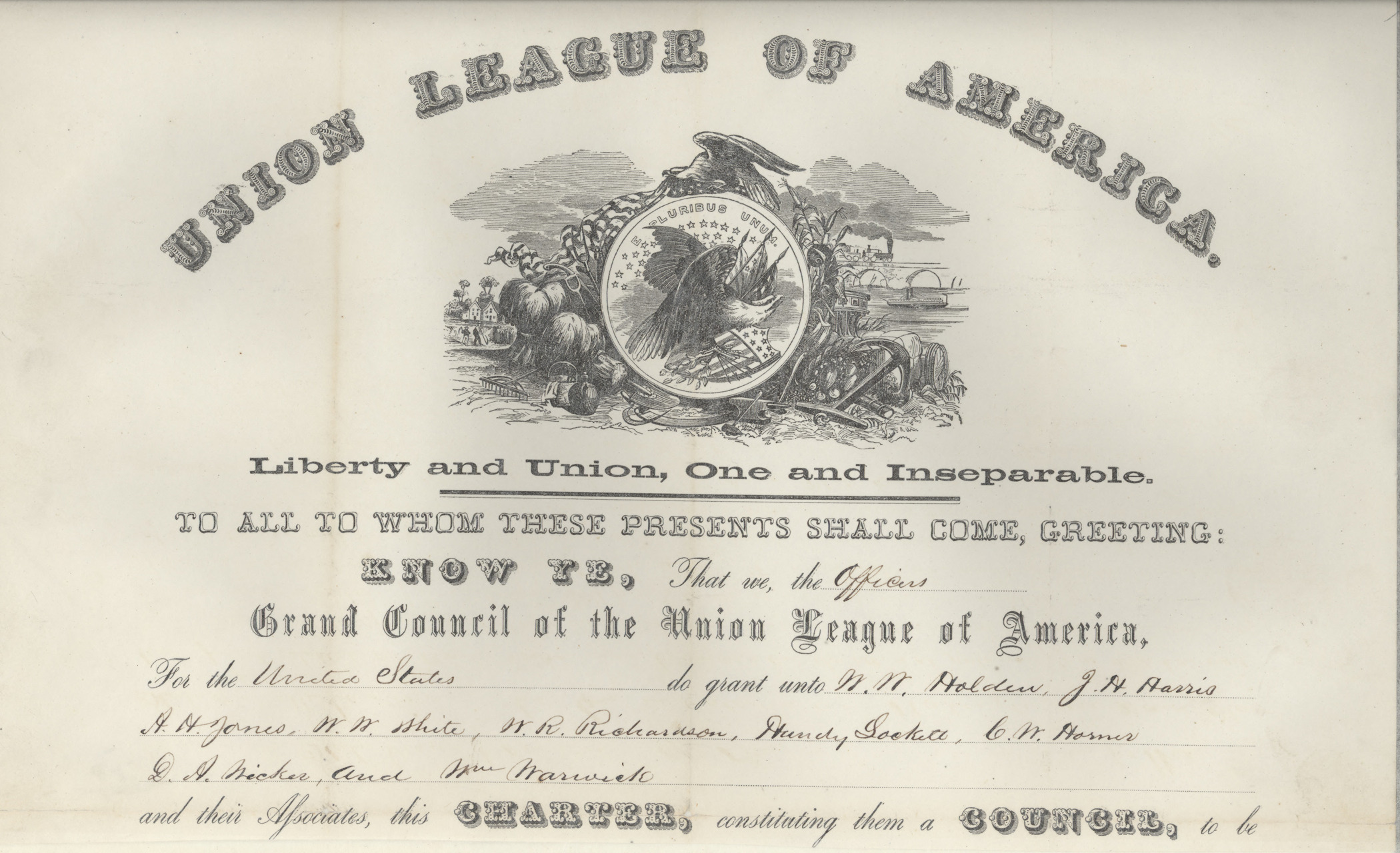
Charter of the North Carolina Grand Council of the Union League bearing Harris' name, March 26, 1867

Radical Republicans in the U.S. Congress grew dissatisfied with the passage of Black Codes and white-instigated racial violence in the South and the inaction of President Johnson on these developments. In March 1867, they passed a series of Reconstruction Acts which placed the Southern states under military authority, stripped former Confederate officials of political rights, and required states of the former Confederacy to ratify new constitutions which guaranteed universal male suffrage. Meanwhile Holden, Ceburn L. Harris, and various other white Unionist politicians in North Carolina formed a committee to organize a convention to prepare for a new constitution and facilitate North Carolina's full readmission into the Union.

Plans were drawn up to hold a convention at the North Carolina State Capitol on March 27, and 156 white delegates were formally invited. Ceburn Harris was instructed by the Unionist committee to reach out to black leaders. He contacted James Harris shortly after the latter returned from Washington. James Harris indicated that blacks would like to participate in the Unionist convention as official delegates. Holden's newspaper, The Standard, subsequently reported that the convention would be open to black and white Unionists. In preparation for the convention, Harris used his position as a deputy member of the national Union League to convene a meeting of white and black political and labor leaders in Raleigh on March 26, 1867 to form the North Carolina Grand Council of the Union League to further the Unionist cause. Holden became the state president while Harris also took on an executive role.

The Unionist convention opened on March 27 in the House of Commons Hall of the State Capitol. Harris attended as one of 147 delegates and was elected one of four vice presidents of the convention. The assembly proceeded to declare the creation of the North Carolina Republican Party, adopt a party platform, and frame an organizational apparatus. Harris became one of 17 black men appointed to the party's state executive committee. Addressing the convention, he assured white delegates that blacks "did not seek domination" and would be loyal to their "true white friends" but demanded that rights for blacks be central to their political efforts. Following the convention, Harris and other black leaders canvassed the Piedmont and eastern sections of the state to promote the Republican cause, and the Union League became a key force for organizing black political power on behalf of Republicans in the state.

In 1867, Harris and fellow Equal Rights League member wrote a petition to the U.S. Congress on behalf of North Carolina's "entire colored population" to ask for the full restoration of Holden's political rights.

=== Constitutional convention of 1868 ===
Constitution of North Carolina, ratified 1868

On October 18, 1867, General Edward R. S. Canby ordered a statewide vote to be held in North Carolina on November 19 and November 20 on the question of whether the state should call a constitutional convention and simultaneously chose delegates for said convention. Voters in the state voted in favor of a convention and elected a large majority of Republican delegates. Harris won election as a delegate for Wake County over former Confederate officer Daniel Gould Fowle. Replying to a note of congratulations from Chief Justice of the United States Salmon P. Chase, Harris wrote, "You can hardly concieve [sic] the genuine pleasure that animates us hourly [...] the effulgent sun of liberty shines with undiminished splender [sic] over the redeemed and purified Commonwealth of my nativity."

The constitutional convention convened on January 14, 1868 at the State Capitol. Historian Leonard Bernstein wrote, "Harris seems to have been acknowledged as the most prominent Negro delegate at the Convention". (Note: The official convention journal stated that Harris nominated Calvin J. Cowles to serve as the convention's president, while both the Raleigh Sentinel and Wilmington Journal reported that Abraham Galloway made the nomination. According to constitutional scholar Ann McColl, Galloway made the initial nomination but, before a vote could be taken, a debate on procedure occurred. Following this, Harris moved the nomination, and a vote was taken.) Harris was placed on the convention's Committee on a Preamble and a Bill of Rights and the Committee on Suffrage and Eligibility to Hold Office. He convinced the convention to create a committee to revise North Carolina's congressional districts. He opposed allowing the convention to pass private legislation, feeling it should focus on completing a constitution. Despite this, he introduced before the body the only petition for divorce concerning a black couple, which it approved. At the end of the convention he and several other delegates were paid off by banker George William Swepson in thanks of support given to state railroad investment.

Harris was among the first blacks in the United States to participate in a major national political party convention when he attended the 1868 Republican National Convention. He also attended the Republican National conventions in 1872 and 1876.

In July 1868, Holden returned to office as governor of North Carolina. Empowered by language in the new constitution to appoint public officials until new elections could be organized, he set about filling vacancies in offices across the state and appointed Harris as one of two black men to the nine-member Raleigh Board of Commissioners. He and the other appointees served from July 15 to January 5, 1869.

=== Legislative tenure ===
Republican leaders in North Carolina's 4th congressional district initially nominated Harris to run for the seat in the U.S. House of Representatives in 1868 but later arranged for him to withdraw his candidacy in favor of Northern Republican and former state commissioner of bankruptcy John T. Deweese. Deweese later claimed to have bribed Harris $1,000 for his support. Harris then devoted his energies to a bid for a seat in the state legislature.

Harris was one of 17 colored men elected to the North Carolina House of Representatives in 1868. Historian Elizabeth Balanoff wrote that he was "clearly the leading spokesman for North Carolina Negroes" in the body. The 1868 legislature sat in two sessions, the first from July to August 1868 and the second from November 1868 to April 1869. During both sessions, Harris chaired the House's Committee on Propositions and Grievances, served on the Committee on the Judiciary, and served on the Committee on Education. During the 1869 session, he additionally served as a member of a committee to investigate the purchase of land for a new state penitentiary.

In February 1869, Harris supported a bill which guaranteed that the testimony of colored persons before courts of law would be treated equally with the testimony of whites. Some other colored representatives believed that legislation of that nature was unnecessary due to provisions in the new constitution guaranteeing racial equality, but Harris believed it necessary that both the constitution and state laws explicitly guarantee racial equality. He later proposed a bill to ensure blacks would be selected for jury duty, but the measure was unsuccessful. Harris also supported measures to assist married women facing neglect and abandonment by their husbands.

In July 1868, Harris supported a resolution calling upon the federal government to supply troops for security in the state to dissuade political violence. Initially wary of the cost of a state force, by the following month he supported the creation of a new state militia. Growing Ku Klux Klan violence against blacks and Republicans led to the introduction of a new militia bill in the legislature in late 1869. Known as the Shoffner Act, it allowed the governor to declare a state of insurrection and deploy the militia to secure order. In January 1870, Harris gave a speech in support the bill, denouncing the murder of black men who had supported education and the Republican Party.

He was president of the National Convention of Colored Men in 1869. The same year, he pressed for ratification of a new education bill after the state public school fund had been depleted. He was a member of the North Carolina House of Representatives (1868–1870, and 1883) and of the North Carolina Senate (1872–1874).

During the 1883 session, Harris was appointed to the House's Committee on the Deaf, dumb, and Blind Asylum and the Committee on Internal Improvements and Railroads.

He lobbied for legislation for equal rights for blacks, by chairing a delegation that met with U.S. President Ulysses S. Grant and presented a memorial to him. He was the National Black Convention's vice president in 1877.

Harris lost two races for the United States House of Representatives, the first by a slim margin in 1870 to Sion H. Rogers. Harris served as a member of the United States Electoral College in 1872, voting for Ulysses S. Grant.

At the North Carolina Republican State Convention in 1872, Harris served as its temporary chairman until Samuel F. Phillips was elected permanent chairman.

== End of Reconstruction ==
By 1874, disfranchisement after the Reconstruction era was instituted by so-called redeemers and state laws passed to take away African Americans' rights that had been granted to them after the Civil War. "Red Shirt" Democrats used scare tactics to prevent African Americans from voting and the Republican party chose to have "lily white" tickets to make it more likely to win elections.

In May 1874, the Wake County Republican Party became beset by factionalism, with county sheriff Timothy F. Lee leading one convention and Raleigh mayor Joseph W. Holden leading another. Harris first sided with Holden, then Lee, and then held his own Republican colored convention, complaining that the other factions were not offering significant enough patronage to blacks.

In June 1874, Harris criticized a national civil rights bill under consideration by Congress, then causing controversy in North Carolina, as unnecessary.

Harris moved to Warren County in 1876. In 1878, his place on the ballot opposing another African-American Republican, James E. O'Hara, contributed to the victory of white Democrat William H. Kitchin. Following commanding Democratic victories in the state elections of 1876, many blacks began migrating out of North Carolina. At Harris' initiative, a meeting of black leaders was held in Raleigh in January 1880 to investigate the causes of the black outmigration. The assembly produced a list of six grievances blacks in North Carolina had, largely describing an oppressive judicial system and inequitable economic arrangements. Some blacks favored moving to Liberia, an action Harris and other black leaders in the state strongly opposed.

On September 17, 1877, Harris led other North Carolina black leaders in issuing a call for a convention "to consider the educational, moral, and national interest" of blacks "and to devise some plan for our advancement in these respects." The convention convened in Raleigh on October 18 and 19 with 130 delegates. Harris chaired the assembly.

The competitive nature of the 1880 United States presidential election led to a resurgence of black political activity in North Carolina. Though Republican nominee James A. Garfield failed to win the state, he secured the national contest and was installed as president in early 1881. Several groups of black Republicans travelled to Washington D. C. in the hopes of securing federal patronage, with one group pleading the case of Harris for postmaster of Raleigh. Realizing that his appointment would divide the local Republican Party, Harris backed away from his candidacy and supported Garfield's preference, John Nichols. At his urging, Nichols hired black leaders Stewart Ellison and Charles Norfleet Hunter as postal clerks. In May 1881, leading black Republicans in the state, including Harris, gathered in Raleigh in a convention and penned a resolution demanding an end to "discriminating against competent and deserving colored men [...] in the election and appointment of officers."

Harris was a delegate to the Republican National Conventions of 1884, when he was a supporter of Chester A. Arthur's unsuccessful bid for re-nomination. He was elected an alderman of Raleigh in 1887.

In the 1888 presidential election, he was elected as a delegate for James G. Blaine. He moved to Washington D. C. in 1891. He accepted a position in President Benjamin Harrison's administration, working in the nation's capital.

=== Oberlin and other community development ===
Harris developed what became known as Oberlin Village, a Raleigh-area community where former slaves were able to own their first homes. Named for Oberlin College, is it considered one of Harris' significant accomplishments. The community is located along Clark Avenue, Wade Avenue, and Oberlin Road. The name was likely chosen in homage to Harris' education at Oberlin College.

In 1868, a Raleigh branch of the Freedman's Saving and Trust Company was established and Harris was made one of its directors. In 1869, Harris and J. Brinton Smith founded the Raleigh Cooperative Land and Building Association, of which Harris was made president. The association operated for 10 years, issuing loans to blacks for the development of real estate.

He helped found the Negro branch of the North Carolina Institute for the Deaf, Dumb, and Blind, which was the first school for blind African-Americans in the nation. He was a member of the North Carolina Agricultural Society for his lifetime.

=== North Carolina Republican ===
Harris returned to Raleigh in 1880 and started a newspaper, the North Carolina Republican. which was produced on "behalf of the Republican party and the advancement of the negro."

== Personal life ==
He married Bettie Miller and they had two children, Florence (died in 1876 or 1889) and David Henry Harris (died 1935). Harris died in Washington, D.C., on May 31, 1891, suddenly of heart disease. A funeral was held for him in Raleigh on June 2 and he was buried in the city's Mount Hope Cemetery. His wife died in 1935.

After his death, he was remembered as a "gifted politician and a talented orator" by Republican and Democratic newspapers. The News and Observer printed an obituary for him and described him as "unusually gifted for a colored man, and has always taken an active part in politics."

== Legacy ==
In 1975, at the behest of a Raleigh chapter of the Links, a North Carolina Highway Historical Marker was erected in Raleigh in honor of Harris. According to journalist Kate Pattison: "It is possible that Harris' legacy was snuffed out by the Reconstruction backlash, while former slaves continued to lose access to education, voting, and hope." His records are held at the Records Relating to African Americans section of the State Archives of North Carolina in Raleigh, North Carolina. Historian Ruth Little described him as "Wake County’s most prominent 19th-century African American leader."

== See also ==
- African American officeholders from the end of the Civil War until before 1900
- North Carolina General Assembly of 1868–1869

== Works cited ==
- Alexander, Roberta Sue (1985). North Carolina Faces the Freedmen : Race Relations During Presidential Reconstruction 1865–67. Durham: Duke University Press. ISBN 0-8223-0628-X.
- Balanoff, Elizabeth (January 1972). "Negro Legislators in the North Carolina General Assembly, July, 1868-February, 1872". The North Carolina Historical Review. 49 (1): 22–55. JSTOR 23529002.
- Beckel, Deborah (2010). Radical Reform: Interracial Politics in Post-Emancipation North Carolina. University of Virginia Press. ISBN 9780813930527.
- Bernstein, Leonard (October 1949). "The Participation of Negro Delegates in the Constitutional Convention of 1868 in North Carolina". The Journal of Negro History. 34 (4): 391–409. JSTOR 2715607.
- Cecelski, David (2012). The Fire of Freedom: Abraham Galloway and the Slaves' Civil War. Chapel Hill: University of North Carolina. ISBN 978-1-4696-2190-6.
- Dailey, Douglass C. (July 1963). "The Elections of 1872 in North Carolina". The North Carolina Historical Review. 40 (3): 338–360. JSTOR 23517644.
- Friedlander, Alan; Gerber, Richard Allen (2018). Welcoming Ruin : The Civil Rights Act of 1875 (ebook ed.). Brill. ISBN 9789004384071.
- Justesen, Benjamin R. (July 2009). "'The Class of '83': Black Watershed in the North Carolina General Assembly". The North Carolina Historical Review. 86 (3): 282–308. ISSN 0029-2494. JSTOR 23523861.
- Little, M. Ruth (October 2020). "Rooted in Freedom: Raleigh, North Carolina's Freedmen Village of Oberlin, an Antebellum Free Black Enclave" (PDF). The North Carolina Historical Review. XCVII (4): 425–450.
- Logan, Frenise A. (January 1956). "The Movement of Negroes from North Carolina, 1876–1894". The North Carolina Historical Review. 33 (1): 45–65. JSTOR 23516385.
- Rabinowitz, Howard N. (1994). "Race Relations in Southern and Northern Cities". Race, Ethnicity, and Urbanization: Selected Essays. University of Missouri Press. ISBN 9780826209306.
- Raper, Horace W. (1985). William W. Holden: North Carolina's Political Enigma. Chapel Hill: University of North Carolina Press. ISBN 0807850608.
- Ripley, C. Peter, ed. (1986). The Black Abolitionist Papers. Vol. II. Chapel Hill: The University of North Carolina University Press. ISBN 0-8078-1698-1.
- Silkenat, David (2011). Moments of Despair: Suicide, Divorce, and Debt in Civil War Era North Carolina. Chapel Hill: The University of North Carolina Press. ISBN 9780807834602.
- Zucchino, David (2021). Wilmington's Lie: The Murderous Coup of 1898 and the Rise of White Supremacy. New York: Grove Press. ISBN 978-0-8021-4865-0.
