= George W. Swepson =

American railroad executive and businessman

George William Swepson (June 23, 1819 – March 7, 1883) was an American businessman and speculator notable for his involvement in the 1868 North Carolina railroad bonds scandal.

== Early life ==
George W. Swepson was born on June 23, 1819, in Mecklenburg County, Virginia.

In 1840, Swepson moved to Caswell County, North Carolina. He married Virginia Bartlett Yancey on November 9, 1842. He subsequently moved to Alamance County.

== Business career ==
=== Early activities ===
In 1858, Swepson led a partnership in acquiring the Haw River House, a bankrupt hotel in Alamance County. In 1859, he became the station agent for the North Carolina Railroad (NCRR) at Haw River. He held that position until 1865 or 1866. By 1860, he possessed property valued at $70,000. In 1864, the State Board of Internal Improvements appointed Swepson to the board of directors of the Western North Carolina Railroad.

During the American Civil War, Swepson was contracted by the NCRR to help exchange prewar bonds in its sinking fund for new ones which would bring in more interest. As the war began to favor a federal victory, the value and integrity of Confederate bonds and wartime state bonds collapsed. Cyrus P. Mendenhall, then in charge of the sinking fund, was hesitant to continue with the policy of exchanging bonds, but Swepson prevailed upon him in early 1865 as the Confederate government collapsed and swapped $23,000 in old bonds for Confederate ones nominally of the same value but for which Swepson had acquired for about $0.03 per dollar. Swepson himself took possession of the old bonds. In 1868, the NCRR sued Mendenhall and Swepson to recover its losses from the last swap. The case was eventually settled in 1877. Swepson also engaged in wartime speculation of goods and at the close of the war was partner in a commission house in New York City.

Unlike many other Southerners, Swepson emerged from the war still in possession of wealth. In May 1865, William Woods Holden was appointed provisional governor of North Carolina by U.S. President Andrew Johnson. He shortly thereafter appointed a new board of directors of the NCRR for the year, adding Swepson to the ranks.

In September 1865, he became president of the newly-established Raleigh National Bank. He resigned the presidency on September 25, 1866, to avoid being obliged to move to Raleigh, but remained on the bank's board of directors. In 1868, he established a textile facility, Falls Neuse Cotton Mill in Alamance County, giving rise to a community dubbed Swepsonville. He also invested in the Falls of the Neuse Manufacturing Company in Wake County.

=== Postwar investments in North Carolina ===
In 1868, Republicans won control of North Carolina's state government. Many were eager to reinvigorate the economy and offer railroad aid. Swepson took advantage of the situation to increase his speculation, becoming the largest railroad investor in North Carolina. As such, he was primarily concerned with the pricing of securities and had little long-term interest in the business success of the companies. Lacking capital of their own to build up the railroads, Swepson and his allies sought to benefit from railroad bond issues and state bond issues made on their behalf and subsequently manipulate the bonds' pricing. In July 1868, the NCRR voted to pay a six percent dividend to its shareholders in the form of mortgage bonds and company scrip. The state government, which held a three-fourths ownership of railroad, received $180,000 in bonds. The state treasury marketed the bonds to raise money and Swepson traveled down from New York to purchase most of them.

Swepson's activities resulted in the creation of a "Ring", led by himself and his main lobbyist, General Milton S. Littlefield, to influence state railroad development. Later investigations estimated that Swepson paid $241,713.39 between 1868 and 1870 to influence state legislation. Significant funds were spent to bribe both Republicans and Conservatives. Most of these expenditures were characterized as "loans". He also let legislators cash the warrants for their per diem and mileage expenses at his bank when the state treasury could not pay them out. Sources are divided on his political allegiances at the time. According to Robert J. Wyllie, Swepson was generally politically inactive but aligned with the values of the defunct Whigs and formally aligned with the Conservatives, though he was friends with many Republicans. According to historian Bess Beatty, he was a Republican. According to historian William McKee Evans, Swepson was a Conservative but sought to support Republicans with strong railway interests to further his financial objectives. Littlefield, Swepson's frequent collaborator, was a Republican.

The General Assembly in its 1868 special session passed several acts concerning railroad construction, namely by increasing the state's investment in several different roads. In one measure backed by Swepson, the Western North Carolina Railroad was subdivided and he was subsequently made president of its Western Division. He convinced the board of directors to give him authority to sell the division's holdings of state bonds to raise money to construct the railway with full discretion to spend the funds as he though most expedient. He subsequently used the proceeds to further his speculative activities. He and Littlefield were also involved in authorized bond sales to support a branch line of the Williamston and Tarboro Railroad which was ultimately never built. Pursuant to an act concerning the payment of state debt, the state held a sale of NCRR bonds given to it as dividends to raise money in October. Working with Samuel McDowell Tate and State Treasurer David A. Jenkins, Swepson speculated on the bonds before their final sale, eventually acquiring them for $0.65 on the dollar and selling them for $0.75 to $0.90 on the dollar. He later offered Holden and Jenkins some bonds at the cost of his purchase, but they declined to buy from him.

The General Assembly also passed legislation appointing a purchasing committee to acquire land for the construction of a state penitentiary. In December 1868, at the committee's direction, the state government paid David J. Pruyn $44,000 in bonds for a 25-acre site at Lockville in Chatham County, more than double its original projection. A State Senate investigative committee later found that the site was of poor quality and that it was unclear who the true seller was. As a result, the legislature ordered the disposal of the site and began searching for a new one. Journalist Jonathan W. Daniels later wrote that the sale was the result of a conspiracy hatched by Swepson, Littlefield, and Pruyn to acquire cheap land and bribe officials to accept its sale at a higher rate. According to Daniels, Swepson financed the arrangement, Littlefield lobbied for the sale, and Pruyn acted as an intermediary and negotiator.

=== Investments in Florida railroads ===
Swepson used the profits of Western Division railroad bond sales to finance investment schemes in Florida railroads. Among postwar political circles in Florida, Swepson was perceived as a wealthy investor with key political connections in North Carolina. In late 1868, he purchased a controlling interest in the Florida, Atlantic and Gulf Central Railroad and reincorporated it as the Florida Central Railroad Company on July 29, 1868. With the help of a local business agent, Colonel Edward Houstoun, Swepson also directed the purchasing of large quantities of mortgage bonds of the Pensacola and Georgia Railroad and the Tallahassee Railroad.

In advance of the June 1869 special session of the Florida Legislature, Swepson dispatched Littlefield to lobby new railroad legislation on his behalf. As a result of his efforts, a law was passed incorporating the Jacksonville, Pensacola and Mobile Railroad Company (JP&M) and authorizing state bonds to be issued and swapped with company bonds to finance the construction of a rail line from Quincy, Florida, to the Alabama border. The law stipulated that the company's real estate holdings be verified by state officials and offered as collateral in case of the collapse of the project, but bribery and additional lobbying by Littlefield rendered these limits meaningless.

Swepson's dealings in Florida came under pressure shortly after the legislative session. First, State Comptroller Robert H. Gamble demanded that Swepson settle his accounts with the board of trustees of Florida's Internal Improvement Fund. Secondly, Houston attempted to settle his accounts and collect money he was owed by Swepson and Littlefield for the services he had performed for them. Lastly, a Florida circuit court judge, becoming alarmed by reports of corruption, attempted to place a portion of the JP&M's line into receivership. Swepson never personally visited Florida and denied all accusations of malfeasance with regards to his investments in the state's railways. While the last development was negated by an order of Florida Supreme Court, he became convinced that he had to publicly demonstrate a willingness to pursue construction of the railways. To that end, he ordered the JP&M to begin construction and arranged for emissaries to assure the public.

The disruptions over Swepson's intentions prevented him and Littlefield from issuing JP&M bonds to swapped for state securities. In January 1870, the legislature reconvened and passed a new law reaffirming the state's intent to swap state bonds with the company's bonds, raising the amount money to be loaned per mile, and permitting the state to issue bonds for 100 miles of road already constructed east of Quincy. That June, the New York World issued a warning to stockbrokers to be wary of Florida railroad bonds, thereby destroying the domestic market for them.

=== Collapse of North Carolina's railroad bonds ===
By early 1869, the General Assembly was under the full sway of the Ring. In February, legislation was passed authorizing four new railroads and the issuance of $18,996,000 in bonds to support them. Holden and the companies' officers had genuine interest in constructing the lines and beginning operations, while Swepson and his associates hoped that the businesses would be funded by mortgage bonds, collapse into bankruptcy, and then be bought cheaply and sold for high profits once operations were fully reestablished. Swepson hatched a plan to increase his railroad holdings by acquiring the state's controlling share in the NCRR. A bill was proposed in the legislature to allow for a sale of the state's control of the railroad, but growing scrutiny of Swepson and anxieties over the potential loss of the state's railroad system led the bill to be defeated in April 1869.

Several developments in 1869 led to heightened scrutiny of the financial health of North Carolina's railroads and the eventual collapse of Swepson's schemes. First, the oversupply of North Carolina bonds in the New York money market caused by Swepson's and other investors' speculative activities contributed to their decline in value with the losses preventing the railroad companies from being able to fund their construction programs. Secondly, a split in the state Republican Party emerged between Holden and State Superintendent of Public Works Ceburn L. Harris over control of the state's interests in railroads. Thirdly, attempts by the railroads, speculators, and state officials to raise the market price of North Carolina bonds failed when New York's money market collapsed during a gold panic. When the General Assembly reconvened in November 1869, legislators moved for committees to be established to examine the financial turmoil of the state's railroads.

Owing to the Ring's influence over the legislature and stiff defiance from Littlefield when he was called to testify, the initial inquiries into the railroads' finances were inconclusive. In 1870, amid public outcry, the North Carolina House of Representatives appointed a commission chaired by former governor Thomas Bragg to pursue the investigation. The commission issued a summons for Swepson to testify on March 3 but the day before he left the city on a train offered to him by North Carolina Railroad President William A. Smith. The commission issued a preliminary report on March 12 before the legislature, at the encouragement of Littlefield, voted to terminate it. The legislature then created a commission chaired by N. W. Woodfin to recover money and securities issued by the state for the benefit of the Western Division of the Western North Carolina Railroad. The commission's attorneys pursued Swepson and Littlefield for years, with Swepson eventually reaching a settlement.

After Conservatives obtained a majority in the General Assembly in the 1870 elections, they appointed the a commission chaired by William Shipp. The Shipp Commission uncovered widespread fraud and bribery related to the railway bonds issues. Its investigation was more partisan in nature and tended to avoid implicating Conservatives. When pressed by the commission, Swepson and the beneficiaries of his lobbying efforts were unable to provide documents which demonstrated that the "loans" he had offered were underpinned by standard loan agreements, that collateral was provided for, or that any money had ever been repaid.

As a result of his involvement in various fraudulent schemes, the term "swepsonize" was coined to describe bad-faith dealings.

=== Later business activities ===
Following the collapse of his railroad schemes, Swepson renewed his energies on his textile mill in Alamance County. In that capacity he initially made entreaties and proposed business transactions with members of the Holt family, who were among the county's leading textile manufacturers. (Note: Swepson sold one mill site in Alamance that he had acquired in 1865 to the Holts in 1866.) These efforts were in the long-term unsuccessful, and by the early 1870s, his mill had created such an oversupply of cloth on the market that the Holts' Granite Mill temporarily suspended production of its signature plaids. He also competed with the Holts' enterprises for local labor. In 1877, Alamance credit raters reported that his true wealth was unknown but that he faced "large judgments". In 1880, his mill at Swepsonville burned, leading to rumors that Swepson had deliberately caused the conflagration to commit insurance fraud.

== Later life and death ==
Swepson maintained a running feud with businessman Aldolphus G. Moore, who was related to the Holts through the marriages of two of his sisters. The origin of their dispute is unclear, though both men held starkly different political beliefs during the Reconstruction era. On one occasion, Moore publicly accused Swepson of attempting to seduce his female workers. In late 1874, cards were circulated around the Piedmont which accused Moore of the same behavior and attacked the character of Moore's sisters. After a detective concluded that Swepson had been responsible, Moore attacked him. As a result, Moore was found guilty in court of committing assault and a restraining order was put in place for one year to keep them separated.

On January 25, 1876, Moore passed by Swepson's Haw River home in the morning and the evening to go hunting. On the latter trip he was accompanied by two factory hands. Carrying two cocked guns, he openly spoke ill of Swepson and sang loudly, giving witnesses in his nearby store that a fight was about to commence. Outside the Swepson house, Moore spotted the owner and demanded he come outside and do battle. Swepson fired two shots from the safety of his home, with his second bullet striking Moore in the spinal cord, rendering him paralyzed. He succumbed to his injuries two days later.

The death of Moore deeply divided popular opinion in Alamance County. In Haw River, Moore's employees viewed the shooting as a murder, while Swepson's factory hands insisted that he had acted in self defense. Swepson was indicted for murder and, to avoid undue local influences, the prosecutor had the case removed to Wake County for trial. Swepson was ultimately acquitted. Afterwards, he permanently moved to Raleigh.

In early 1883, Swepson was rendered bedridden by an illness. He died on March 7 at his home in Raleigh and was buried in Oakwood Cemetery. The mill at Sewpsonville was later rebuilt by one of his business associates and, after another fire, was rebuilt again and was operational until it closed in the 1970s. His papers are held by the State Archives of North Carolina.

== Works cited ==
- Beatty, Bess (1999). Alamance : The Holt Family and Industrialization in a North Carolina County, 1837--1900. Baton Rouge: Louisiana State University Press. ISBN 9780807124499.
- Bishir, Catherine W.; Glass, Brent D. (1983). "Falls of the Neuse Manufacturing Company" (PDF). National Register of Historic Places - Nomination and Inventory. North Carolina State Historic Preservation Office.
- Cassebaum, Anne Melyn (2014). Down Along the Haw : The History of a North Carolina River. Jefferson: McFarland. ISBN 9780786484980.
- Evans, William McKee (1995). Ballots and Fence Rails: Reconstruction on the Lower Cape Fear (reprint ed.). Athens: University of Georgia Press. ISBN 0-8203-1731-4.
- Fenlon, Paul E. (April 1954). "The Notorious Swepson-Littlefield Fraud: Railroad Financing in Florida, 1868-1871". The Florida Historical Quarterly. 32 (4): 231–261. JSTOR 30139716.
- Powell, William S. (1976). The North Carolina Gazetteer: A Dictionary of Tar Heel Places. Chapel Hill: University of North Carolina Press. ISBN 9780807812471. OCLC 733691912.
- Stokes, Durward T. (1981). Company Shops, the Town Built by a Railroad. Winston Salem: J. F. Blair. ISBN 9780895870162.
- Taylor, Gregory S. (2021). Central Prison : A History of North Carolina's State Penitentiary. Baton Rouge: Louisiana State University Press. ISBN 9780807174876.
- Trelease, Allen W. (1991). The North Carolina Railroad, 1849–1871, and the Modernization of North Carolina. Chapel Hill: University of North Carolina Press. ISBN 9780807819418.
- Raper, Horace W. (1985). William W. Holden: North Carolina's Political Enigma. Chapel Hill: University of North Carolina Press. ISBN 0807850608.
- Summers, Mark Wahlgren (2014). Railroads, Reconstruction, and the Gospel of Prosperity Aid Under the Radical Republicans, 1865-1877 (reprint ed.). Princeton: Princeton University Press. ISBN 9781400857128.
