= 3rd South Carolina Colored Infantry Regiment =

- South Carolina state flag
- Active: June 1863 to March 14, 1864
- Country: United States
- Allegiance: United States of America; Union
- Branch: Infantry

The 3rd South Carolina Colored Infantry Regiment was an infantry regiment of African-American in the Union Army during the American Civil War.

== Service ==
The 3rd South Carolina Infantry was organized at Hilton Head, South Carolina and mustered into Federal service in June 1863. The unit was on post duty at Hilton Head until it was moved to Jacksonville, Florida in February 1864.

There was a protest over pay as soldiers lay down their rifles to protest receiving half the pay of white soldiers. Senator Henry Wilson of Massachusetts mentioned the incident during a debate in Congress over the pay of African-American Union soldiers:

Some of the regiments first raised in South Carolina were promised and received thirteen dollars per month, but that promise has not been kept, and they are now paid only seven dollars per month. The discontent in these regiments has become so great that a mutiny broke out in the third South Carolina volunteers, and the leader of it, who was a sergeant, has been shot for mutiny, and others are under arrest and they too may be tried and shot for violation of discipline, impelled by a burning sense of our injustice.

Colonel Augustus G. Bennett was the commanding officer. Sergeant William Walker and Samson Read were involved in the mutiny. Walker was executed.

The regiment was consolidated with 4th South Carolina to form the 21st United States Colored Infantry Regiment on March 14, 1864.

== See also ==
- List of Union South Carolina Civil War Units
- South Carolina in the American Civil War
