= A. G. Bennett =

A. G. Bennett may refer to:

- Alvin Gladstone Bennett (1918–2004), Jamaican journalist and novelist
- Augustus G. Bennett (1836–1897), American soldier
