= List of Union units from South Carolina in the American Civil War =

The following is a list of Union Army regiments raised in South Carolina during the American Civil War. Only African-American units were raised in the state. Four complete regiments were organized and mustered into service; Union authorities planned to raise a fifth regiment but instead transferred the recruits to the other regiments. The list of South Carolina Confederate Civil War units is shown separately.

== Infantry ==
- 1st Regiment South Carolina Volunteer Infantry (African Descent) – later 33rd United States Colored Infantry Regiment
- 2nd Regiment South Carolina Volunteer Infantry (African Descent) – later 34th United States Colored Infantry Regiment
- 3rd Regiment South Carolina Volunteer Infantry (African Descent) – later 21st United States Colored Infantry Regiment
- 4th Regiment South Carolina Volunteer Infantry (African Descent) – later 21st United States Colored Infantry Regiment
- 5th Regiment South Carolina Volunteer Infantry (African Descent) – failed to complete organization, men transferred to 3rd and 4th Regiments

== See also ==
- Lists of American Civil War Regiments by State
- United States Colored Troops
