= 5th South Carolina Colored Infantry Regiment =

- Active: 1863–1864
- Country: United States
- Allegiance: Union
- Branch: Infantry
- Size: Regiment
- Engagements: American Civil War

The 5th South Carolina Colored Infantry Regiment was an infantry regiment of African descent from South Carolina that failed to complete its organization to serve in the Union Army during the American Civil War. The enlisted men were transferred to the 3rd Regiment South Carolina Volunteer Infantry (African Descent) and the 4th Regiment South Carolina Volunteer Infantry (African Descent).

== Bibliography ==
- Dyer, Frederick H. (1959). A Compendium of the War of the Rebellion. New York and London. Thomas Yoseloff, Publisher. LCCN 59-12963.
