= Dusty Cooke =

American baseball player and manager (1907–1987)

- Outfielder
- Born: June 23, 1907; Swepsonville, North Carolina, U.S.
- Died: November 21, 1987 (aged 80); Raleigh, North Carolina, U.S.
- Batted: Left Threw: Right

MLB debut
- April 15, 1930, for the New York Yankees

Last MLB appearance
- September 28, 1938, for the Cincinnati Reds

MLB statistics
- Batting average: .280
- Home runs: 24
- Runs batted in: 229
- Stats at Baseball Reference
- Managerial record at Baseball Reference

Teams
- As player: New York Yankees (1930–1932); Boston Red Sox (1933–1936); Cincinnati Reds (1938); As manager: Philadelphia Phillies (1948); As coach: Philadelphia Phillies (1948–1952)

Allen Lindsey "Dusty" Cooke (June 23, 1907 – November 21, 1987) was an American professional baseball outfielder, coach, and manager, in Major League Baseball (MLB), who played for three different big league teams, between 1930 and 1938. During his playing days, Cooke stood 6 feet 1 inch (1.85 m) tall, weighing 205 pounds (93 kg). He batted left-handed and threw right-handed. He was born in Swepsonville, North Carolina.

== Playing career ==
Cooke's professional playing career lasted for 16 seasons (1927–1942). Known mainly for his defensive abilities, he was a competent fourth outfielder who was able to handle all three outfield positions. In 1930, Cooke reached the major leagues with the New York Yankees. He spent three seasons there before moving on to the Boston Red Sox (1933–1936) and Cincinnati Reds (1938). Cooke's most productive season came in 1933 with Boston, when he batted .293 and posted career-best numbers in games played (119), runs (86), doubles (35), triples (10), and runs batted in (RBI) (54). In 1935, he hit a career-high .306, in 100 games, while compiling a .400 on-base percentage (tenth in the American League).

In his eight-season MLB career, Cooke was a .280 lifetime hitter (489-for-1,745), with 24 home runs and 229 RBI in 608 games played, including 324 runs, 109 doubles, 28 triples, 32 stolen bases, .384 on-base percentage, .416 slugging percentage and a solid walk-to-strikeout ratio of 1.06 (290-to-276).

== Military service ==
Cooke enlisted in the Navy's Aviation Cadet Training Program located on the University of North Carolina at Chapel Hill campus in 1943. Cooke was stunned that one of the first recruits he met upon his arrival in the dormitory was Ted Williams, the American League batting champion. Cooke did not complete aviation training and instead spent the war as a Navy pharmacist's mate, 3rd class. During the war, Cooke participated in the Iwo Jima where his ship was attacked for more than three hours by Kamikaze, and then several months later in the Battle of Okinawa.

== Athletic trainer, coach and manager ==
Leveraging the fitness conditioning training he received in the Navy, after the war Cooke became the athletic trainer for the Philadelphia Phillies in 1946. Two years later, in 1948, he joined the Phillies' coaching staff. Cooke was a coach through June 30, 1952, including service on the 1950 "Whiz Kids" team, that won the National League pennant. He also was the Phillies' interim manager, from July 16–25, 1948, after the firing of Ben Chapman. Cooke posted a 6–6 record (.500), before handing over the reins to the team's permanent skipper, Eddie Sawyer.

Cooke died in Raleigh, North Carolina, November 21, 1987, at age 80.
