= Atkinson-Smith House =

Historic house in North Carolina, United States

- U.S. National Register of Historic Places
- Location within North Carolina Location within the United States
- Location: 10 miles (16 km) east of Smithfield off SR 1007, near Smithfield, North Carolina
- Coordinates: 35°42′50″N 78°14′17″W
- Area: 9 acres (3.6 ha)
- Built: c. 1850
- Architectural style: Greek Revival
- NRHP reference No.: 75001276
- Added to NRHP: June 5, 1975

Atkinson-Smith House is a historic plantation home located near Smithfield, Johnston County, North Carolina.

== Description and history ==
It was built about 1850, and is a two-story, three-bay, Greek Revival style frame dwelling. It has a low hipped roof and exterior end chimneys. The front facade features a two-tier superimposed tetrastyle entrance portico with fluted Doric order columns. It was the home of Congressman William A. Smith (1828-1888).

It was listed on the National Register of Historic Places on June 5, 1975.
