= St. Paul A.M.E. Church (Raleigh, North Carolina) =

Historic church in North Carolina, United States

- U.S. National Register of Historic Places
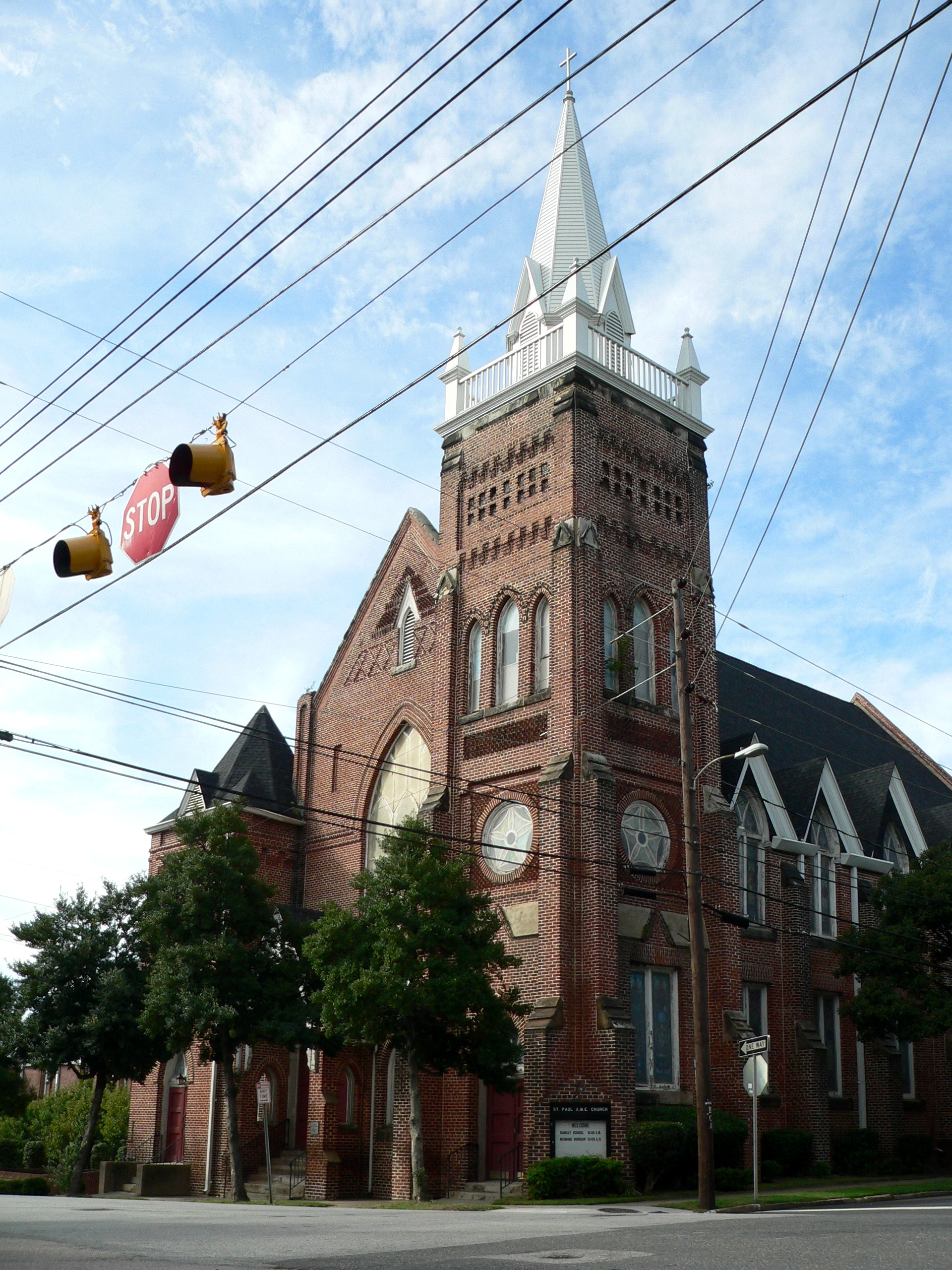

- Location within North Carolina Location within the United States
- Location: 402 West Edenton St., Raleigh, North Carolina
- Coordinates: 35°46′53.57″N 78°38′43.93″W
- Built: 1884
- Architectural style: Late Gothic Revival
- NRHP reference No.: 80004607
- Added to NRHP: November 5, 1987

The St. Paul A.M.E. Church is a historic American Gothic Revival style African Methodist Episcopal Church located in Raleigh, North Carolina. A red brick and frame structure built in 1884 by black masons, St. Paul's was the first independent congregation of African Americans in Raleigh and is the oldest African-American church in Wake County, North Carolina. Before the end of the Civil War, the future founders of St. Paul's had been slave members of the Edenton Street Methodist Episcopal Church, now known as Edenton Street United Methodist Church. The members of the church began calling their congregation "St. Paul's" in 1848. The church was listed on the National Register of Historic Places in November 1987 and is also a Raleigh Historic Landmark.

== History ==
From 1846 to 1853, Edenton Street's black membership worshipped at Old Christ Church in Raleigh. After white Methodists bought the building in 1853, the members moved to a different building at the intersection of Edenton and Harrington streets.

In 1865 after emancipation, the black congregation left the Edenton Street Church to affiliate with the African Methodist Episcopal Church, a denomination organized in 1816 by Reverend Richard Allen, a free black in Philadelphia, Pennsylvania. St. Paul's became the first African Methodist congregation in Raleigh and Wake County. It both attracted existing leaders in the black community and was a training ground for new leaders. After slavery was abolished, St. Paul's ministers became leaders and activists in black politics during the Reconstruction period. As the state capitol, Raleigh became a center of black political activity. In addition, some of North Carolina's foremost black spokesmen, such as State Senator Henry Eppes, Legislator Stewart Ellison and R. W. H. Leak, a leader in the late 19th century Republican-Populist movement, were members of St. Paul's.

Not only men were active in the church. Women quickly organized or continued their own groups, mobilizing around issues of women and children's welfare, health and education. The black community strongly supported education of its children, and the church linked it to the moral welfare and future of the community.

In 1884 the cornerstone of the new church was laid. Due to financial strains of its members, construction of the new St. Paul's Church took 25 years to complete. Many Southerners struggled in the essentially rural economy in the quarter century following the American Civil War. Because of earning lower wages in a segregated society, members of the congregation chose to live on bread and molasses to raise enough money to complete the church.

In May 1901, the building was completed. The congregation marked the sanctuary's completion with a joyous two-week revival. Governor Charles B. Aycock delivered a speech when the church finally opened and The News & Observer described St. Paul's new building as "one of the handsomest colored churches in the South." Although the majority of the church had been built, construction on the spire did not take place for another eight years. In 1909 an accidental fire consumed most of the building, leaving only the brick walls. Donations from the white community as well as black resulted in reconstruction of the church, including addition of the long-planned spire.

In 1909, the building was renovated by Black architect Gaston Alonzo Edwards.

During the Civil Rights Movement, the black community held meetings and rallies at St. Paul's, as it continued as a center of community organizing. Members had long been active in working for voter registration in the black community; with its level of educated residents, Raleigh had a higher percentage of black population registered before the later stages of the Civil Rights Movement than did more rural areas. During the 1960s and after success of the Voting Rights Act, the community mobilized to increase voter registration and encourage turnout at elections.

A variety of national speakers were guests at the church. For instance, in 1988 Jesse Jackson delivered a "Rainbow Coalition" speech at the church. St. Paul currently has Rev. Dr. Larry McDonald as their pastor and the church has a population of around 900 members. St. Paul A.M.E. Church has become an historic place in downtown of Raleigh, North Carolina.

== See also ==
- List of Registered Historic Places in North Carolina
