= Milton S. Littlefield =

Union Army general (1830–1899)

- Born: Milton Smith Littlefield; July 19, 1830; Ellisburgh, New York, U.S.
- Died: March 7, 1899 (aged 68); New York City, U.S.
- Burial place: Kensico Cemetery
- Children: 2
- Military career
- Allegiance: United States of America; Union
- Branch: United States Army; Union Army
- Service years: 1861–1866
- Rank: Colonel; Bvt. Brigadier General
- Units: 14th Illinois Infantry; 14th Illinois Cavalry
- Commands: 54th Massachusetts Infantry; 4th South Carolina Infantry (African Descent); 21st USCT Infantry
- Conflicts: American Civil War
- Other work: Teacher, lawyer, businessman

Milton Smith Littlefield (July 19, 1830 – March 7, 1899) was an American businessman dubbed the "Prince of the Carpetbaggers" during the Reconstruction Era. He also served as a Union Army officer during the American Civil War.

== Biography ==
Milton Smith Littlefield was born on July 19, 1830, in Ellisburgh, New York. The corruption scandal was brought forth after George W. Swepson and Littlefield defrauded the state by $4 million, after the North Carolina Legislature granted $27.8 million in Railroad bonds. Along with Swepson, Littlefield was indicted for the fraud but was never convicted.

When the American Civil War broke out in 1861 Littlefield organized a company of infantry, which became Company F of the 14th Illinois Infantry, and was elected as its captain. After serving in the west at Shiloh and Corinth, Littlefield was made Lieutenant Colonel of the new 14th Illinois Cavalry. In 1863 he was sent to the South, briefly commanded the 54th Massachusetts Infantry, a colored unit, and was ordered to recruit black troops. Littlefield raised the 4th South Carolina Infantry(African Descent). Whose Colonel he became. When the United States Colored Troops were organized his regiment became the 21st USCT Infantry. On November 26, 1864, Littlefield was given a brevet promotion to brigadier general of Volunteers. He served as brigade and district commander and was mustered out on April 25, 1866.

== Further cases ==
According to a court record filed on March 29, 1886, on March 18, 1872, John H. Miller sued Littlefield in Duval County, Florida over a debt of fifty thousand dollars. His lust for profiteering was exhibited in his Civil War service, having charge of recruitment of black troops in the Department of the South, he sought to have freedmen pressed into service and appropriated the enlistment bounty many of these 'recruits' were due. Allegedly he used these misappropriations to fund these financial schemes.

There were also related findings with the Pensacola, Florida, railroad lines, as well as suits involving Calvin Littlefield, who filed to have the bonds given over to him.

== Death and legacy ==
Littlefield married and had two sons, including Milton S. Jr. He died on March 7, 1899, at his home on Madison Avenue in New York City. He was buried in Kensico Cemetery. Early historiographical coverage of Littlefield was deeply negative. In 1958, journalist and author Jonathan W. Daniels published a biography of Littlefield, Prince of Carpetbaggers. Daniels argued that Littlefield was a contradictory and sometimes scapegoated figure who was typical of the moral ambiguities of the Reconstruction era in the South.

== See also ==
- 1868 North Carolina railroad bonds scandal
