= Joseph J. Davis =

American judge

Joseph Jonathan Davis
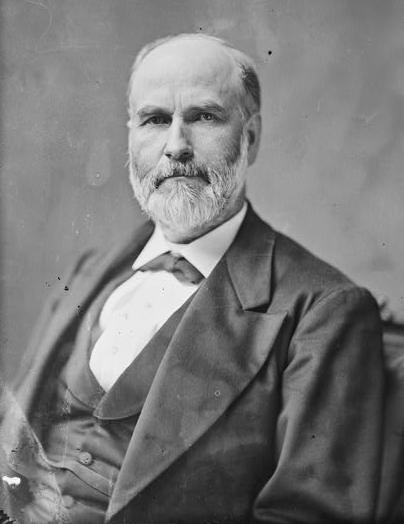

Member of the U.S. House of Representatives from North Carolina's 4th district
- In office March 4, 1875 – March 3, 1881
- Preceded by: William A. Smith
- Succeeded by: William Ruffin Cox

Member of the North Carolina House of Representatives
- In office 1868–1870

Personal details
- Born: April 13, 1828 Louisburg, North Carolina, U.S.
- Died: August 7, 1892 (aged 64) Louisburg, North Carolina, U.S.
- Party: Democratic
- Profession: Politician, lawyer, judge

Military service
- Allegiance: Confederate States
- Branch/service: Confederate States Army
- Rank: Captain
- Unit: 47th North Carolina Infantry
- Battles/wars: American Civil War

Joseph Jonathan Davis (April 13, 1828 – August 7, 1892) was an American lawyer and judge who represented his native North Carolina's 4th congressional district from 1875 to 1881.

== Biography ==
Born near the small North Carolina town of Louisburg, Davis attended Louisburg Academy, Wake Forest College and the College of William & Mary. He graduated from the law department of the University of North Carolina at Chapel Hill in 1850 and was admitted to the bar the same year, commencing practice in Oxford, North Carolina and later Louisburg, North Carolina. During the Civil War, he served as captain of Company G in the 47th North Carolina Infantry Regiment in the Confederate Army.

Davis was a member of the North Carolina House of Representatives from 1868 to 1870 and was elected a Democrat to the United States House of Representatives in 1874, serving from 1875 to 1881. Afterwards, he resumed practicing law, was appointed an associate justice in the North Carolina Supreme Court in 1887 and was elected to the position in 1888. He died in Louisburg at the age of 64 and was interred in the town's Oaklawn Cemetery.

U.S. House of Representatives
Preceded by William A. Smith	Member of the U.S. House of Representatives from North Carolina's 4th congressional district March 4, 1875 – March 3, 1881	Succeeded by William Ruffin Cox
