= Because They Know Not =

Novel by the Jamaican author Alvin Gladstone Bennett

- Book cover
- Author: Alvin Gladstone Bennett
- Language: English
- Publication date: 1959

Because They Know Not is a novel by Jamaican author Alvin Gladstone Bennett. Inspired by Bennett's interactions with the Caribbean immigrant community after his migration from Jamaica to Britain in 1954 and first published in 1959, the novel is billed as a "powerful story on the colour problem" and a "novel that will long be remembered" on the front and back covers respectively.

== Plot ==
Because They Know Not follows Jamaican clerk Tom Hendon, as he leaves his family in pursuit of a better career in London. While en route to England, Tom actively avoids talking to the "ordinary" and "uncultured" immigrants on the ship. Back home, Tom's spouse Emma, a Jamaican educator, has an affair with school inspector Max Crost, who is also an anglophile. At the same time, Tom has an affair with a fellow Jamaican immigrant, Marie. Crost is subsequently murdered by Marie's husband; Marie gives birth to Tom's son, Rupert, and dies soon after. Reunited at Saint Andrew Parish, Jamaica, Tom and Emma reflect on the "hypocrisy" of Jamaican society. Tom places his "adopted son" in the care of Hilda, who is later revealed to be Tom's sister, and begins a short-lived political career.

== Reception and legacy ==
In a review for African Affairs, Mercedes Mackay described Because They Know Not as an "interesting and unusual book". While pointing out Bennett's use of "long words and stilted phraseology", she praised the novel's "descriptive power" and "delightful humor". She concluded that works like Because They Know Not could "explain and endear the Jamaicans to the ordinary Englishman far better than all the learned studies of the coloured problem." F. I. Case compared the novel to The Lonely Londoners by Sam Selvon while noting that the struggles of Bennett's protagonist were similar to those of "Caribbean immigrants to Britain in the 1950s". Alison Donnell discussed the novel in The Cambridge History of Black and Asian British Writing: "Although uninterested in being a literary masterpiece, Bennett's forgotten novel presents a curiously rewarding combination of melodrama and satire to foreground the serious ramifications of Britain's false sense of belonging." A copy of the novel is showcased at the World City gallery at the Museum of London Docklands.
