= 1868 North Carolina railroad bonds scandal =

The 1868-1869 North Carolina railroad bonds scandal, sometimes called the "Railroad Ring" scandal, took place in the U.S. state of North Carolina after Milton S. Littlefield and George W. Swepson defrauded North Carolina of $4 million by issuing fraudulent bonds for a railroad project.

== Background ==
In 1855, the Western North Carolina Railroad was chartered to be built from Salisbury to Asheville. The mountainous terrain and interruptions related to the American Civil War delayed the completion of the line.

== Scandal ==
From 1868 to 1869 the government of North Carolina authorized the issuing of $27.83 million worth of bonds and stocks to the benefit of 18 railway companies so they could furnish internal improvements for the state. In 1868 the Western North Carolina Railroad was taken over by Milton S. Littlefield and George W. Swepson through their purchase of a majority of its bonds. Littlefield was a lobbyist who had moved to the state from the North, while Swepson was a North Carolinian banker. Both men encouraged the Republican-controlled North Carolina General Assembly in its heavy spending on the railways. Swepson convinced Republican Governor William Woods Holden that state tax revenue would be sufficient to pay the interest owed for the bonds. Ultimately, North Carolina's government spent half of all its railroad aid on the Western North Carolina Railroad. Swepson disbursed about $250,000 in support of the lobbying effort. Most of these expenditures were characterized as "loans". He also let legislators cash the warrants for their per diem and mileage expenses at his bank when the state treasury could not pay them out.

Under Littlefield's and Swepson's leadership, the Western North Carolina Railroad amassed a significant debt. They invested $3 million worth of North Carolina bonds in Florida railroad investments. They also participated in fraudulent stock subscriptions and released fake securities. Littlefield then left the state. By 1870 the state bond market had collapsed. Little railroad construction was actually done and North Carolina's government was left in heavy debt with its credit worthiness threatened.

== Investigation ==
Scandals related to railroads mounted in 1869 and 1870, leading some Republican legislators to call for investigations. As part of this backlash, scrutiny was brought to bear upon Littlefield, who was serving as the official state printer. In January 1870 the State House of Representatives passed a resolution calling for an investigation into his setting of rates for his service. The following month, the General Assembly abolished the office of state printer.

Concerned about the state's financial reputation, in 1870 Conservatives and reform-oriented Republicans in the State Senate authorized the creation of three-person investigative committee under former governor Thomas Bragg to launch an inquiry into fraudulent activity with regards to the issuance of railway bonds. Holden believed the accusations of fraud were politically motivated, and other Senate Republicans limited the scope of the investigation. With its bipartisan genesis, the investigation was generally apolitical in its work. After Conservatives obtained a majority in the General Assembly in that year's elections, they appointed the Shipp Commission. The Shipp Commission uncovered widespread fraud and bribery related to the railway bonds issues. Its investigation was more partisan in nature and tended to avoid implicating Conservatives. When pressed by the commission, Swepson and the beneficiaries of his lobbying efforts were unable to provide documents which demonstrated that the "loans" he had offered were underpinned by standard loan agreements, that collateral was provided for, or that any money had ever been repaid.

Littlefield and Swepson were indicted, but never convicted. On February 9, 1871, the North Carolina House of Representatives adopted an article of impeachment against Governor Holden accusing him of conspiring with Swepson to defraud the state in the bonds scandal. It was ultimately not revealed to the public or tried in the State Senate for fear of implicating some state senators involved in the ongoing impeachment trial of Holden for actions taken during the Kirk–Holden war. Holden was never proven to have been involved in the scheme with the motive to enrich himself or otherwise personally benefit.

== Aftermath ==
=== Financial and political implications ===
Of all the state bonds appropriated to support the railways, approximately $13,000,000 were issued and sold, $4,000,000 were not sold and returned to the state, and $10,000,000 were never issued. Most of the state bonds were secured by company bonds, but these were eventually found to be without value.

Of all the North Carolina railroads receiving state aid during the activities of the ring, only the Salem Railroad Company and the Edenton and Suffolk Company were not implicated in the bribery scandal.

The state's railroad development from the bonds issued stagnated until 1880. In 1870 the state government purchased the Western North Carolina Railroad and subsequently leased it to other companies. In February 1874, the railroad, still incomplete and bankrupt, was linked with the North Carolina Railroad and placed under the receivership of North Carolina Railroad President William A. Smith.

=== Political effects ===
The scandal proved politically damaging to Governor Holden and North Carolina Republicans.

Both the Republican and Conservative/Democratic parties attempted to use the scandal to tarnish each others' candidates while simultaneously offering support to their own members who had been implicated. Conservatives Battle, Merrimon, Ransom, Vance, and Fowle continued to pursue successful careers. (Note: Battle served as president of the University of North Carolina from 1876 to 1891, Merrimon served as chief Justice of the North Carolina Supreme Court from 1889 to 1892 and in the U.S. Senate from 1873 to 1879, Ransom served in the Senate from 1872 to 1895, Vance served as governor from 1877 to 1879 and in the Senate from 1879 to 1894, and Fowle served as governor from 1889 to 1891.) Conversely, Clingman's ambitions to rebuild his political career outside the support of the major parties as a reformer were continuously attacked and undermined by his associations with Swepson.

== Works cited ==
- Evans, William McKee (1995). Ballots and Fence Rails: Reconstruction on the Lower Cape Fear (reprint ed.). Athens: University of Georgia Press. ISBN 0-8203-1731-4.
- Friedlander, Alan; Gerber, Richard Allen (2018). Welcoming Ruin : The Civil Rights Act of 1875 (ebook ed.). Brill. ISBN 9789004384071.
- Huffard, R. Scott Jr. (2019). Engines of Redemption: Railroads and the Reconstruction of Capitalism in the New South. Chapel Hill: The University of North Carolina Press. ISBN 9781469652825.
- Jeffrey, Thomas E. (October 1997). "An Unclean Vessel: Thomas Lanier Clingman and the "Railroad Ring"". The North Carolina Historical Review. 74 (4): 389–431. JSTOR 23521050.
- Nash, Steven E. (2016). Reconstruction's Ragged Edge: The Politics of Postwar Life in the Southern Mountains. Chapel Hill: The University of North Carolina Press. ISBN 9781469626246.
- Raper, Horace W. (1985). William W. Holden: North Carolina's Political Enigma. Chapel Hill: University of North Carolina Press. ISBN 0807850608.
- Summers, Mark Wahlgren (2014). Railroads, Reconstruction, and the Gospel of Prosperity Aid Under the Radical Republicans, 1865-1877 (reprint ed.). Princeton: Princeton University Press. ISBN 9781400857128.
- Trelease, Allen W. (August 1976). "Republican Reconstruction in North Carolina: A Roll-Call Analysis of the State House of Representatives, 1868-1870". The Journal of Southern History. 42 (3): 319–344. JSTOR 2207155.
