= Swepsonville, North Carolina =

- Town
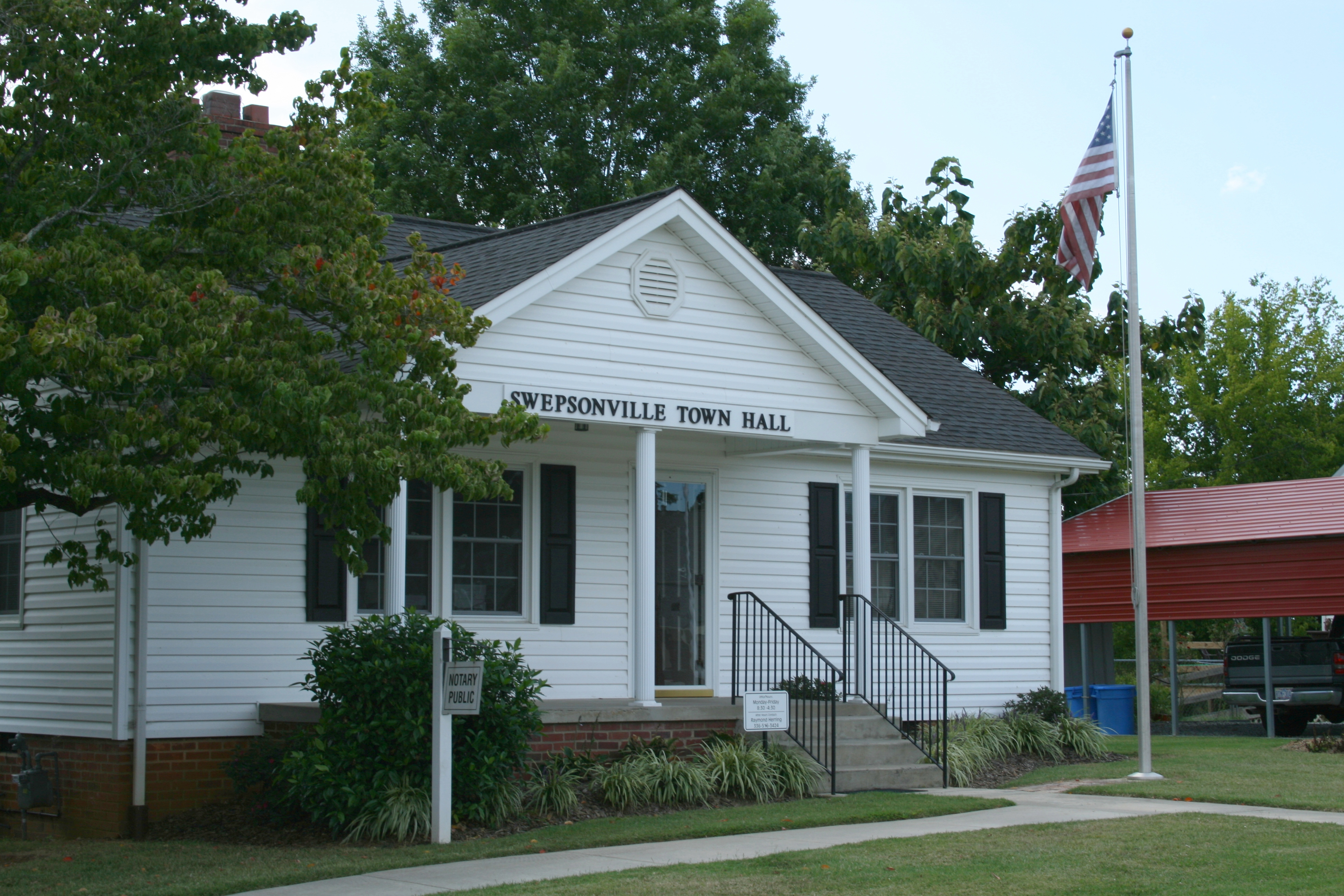
- Swepsonville Town Hall

- Seal Logo

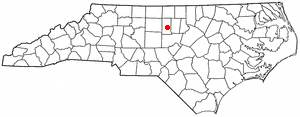
- Location of Swepsonville, North Carolina

- Location within North Carolina Location within the United States
- Coordinates: 36°01′43″N 79°21′18″W
- Country: United States
- State: North Carolina
- County: Alamance
- Incorporated: 1997

Government
  - Mayor: Henry Carrouth

Area
  - Total: 1.52 sq mi (3.93 km^{2})
  - Land: 1.44 sq mi (3.72 km^{2})
  - Water: 0.081 sq mi (0.21 km^{2})
- Elevation: 558 ft (170 m)

Population (2020)
  - Total: 2,445
  - Density: 1,702.8/sq mi (657.47/km^{2})
- Time zone: UTC-5 (Eastern (EST))
  - Summer (DST): UTC-4 (EDT)
- ZIP code: 27359
- Area code: 336
- FIPS code: 37-66460
- GNIS feature ID: 2406703
- Website: swepsonvillenc.com

Swepsonville is a town in Alamance County, North Carolina, United States. It is part of the Burlington, North Carolina Metropolitan Statistical Area. The population at the 2020 census was 2,445.

== History ==
Swepsonville was named in honor of a textile mill established in the area in 1868 by George William Swepson. It was first incorporated as a municipality in 1887, though its charter was repealed in 1901. The town was reincorporated in 1997.

== Geography ==
According to the United States Census Bureau, the town has a total area of 1.5 square miles (3.9 km^{2}), of which 1.4 square miles (3.6 km^{2}) is land and 0.077 square miles (0.2 km^{2}), or 5.53%, is water.

== Demographics ==
Historical population
Census	Pop.	Note	%±
1890	326		—
1900	441		35.3%
1990	1,195		—
2000	922		−22.8%
2010	1,154		25.2%
2020	2,445		111.9%
U.S. Decennial Census

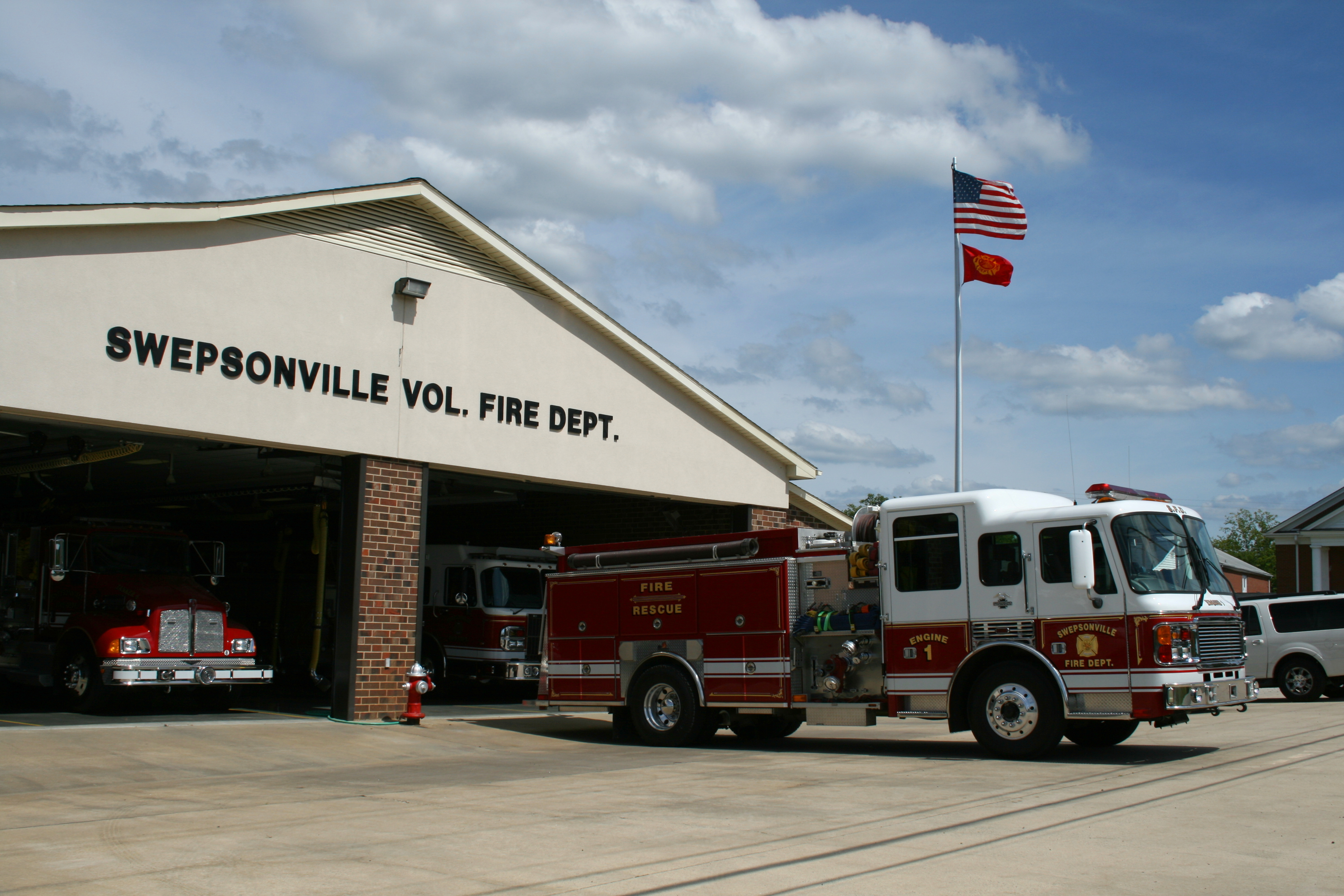
The Swepsonville Volunteer Fire Department

=== 2020 census ===
Swepsonville racial composition
Race	Number	Percentage
White (non-Hispanic)	1,597	65.32%
Black or African American (non-Hispanic)	421	17.22%
Native American	12	0.49%
Asian	110	4.5%
Pacific Islander	2	0.08%
Other/Mixed	109	4.46%
Hispanic or Latino	194	7.93%

As of the 2020 census, Swepsonville had a population of 2,445. The median age was 39.8 years. 24.5% of residents were under the age of 18 and 16.0% of residents were 65 years of age or older. For every 100 females there were 93.3 males, and for every 100 females age 18 and over there were 86.7 males age 18 and over.

100.0% of residents lived in urban areas, while 0.0% lived in rural areas.

There were 918 households in Swepsonville, of which 35.6% had children under the age of 18 living in them. Of all households, 58.3% were married-couple households, 11.7% were households with a male householder and no spouse or partner present, and 24.0% were households with a female householder and no spouse or partner present. About 21.4% of all households were made up of individuals and 8.3% had someone living alone who was 65 years of age or older.

There were 975 housing units, of which 5.8% were vacant. The homeowner vacancy rate was 0.6% and the rental vacancy rate was 4.4%.

=== 2000 census ===
At the 2000 census, there were 922 people, 383 households, and 271 families residing in the town. The population density was 894.5 inhabitants per square mile (345.4/km^{2}). There were 405 housing units at an average density of 392.9 per square mile (151.7/km^{2}). The racial makeup of the town was 94.03% White, 3.80% African American, 0.43% Asian, 0.54% from other races, and 1.19% from two or more races. Hispanic or Latino of any race were 1.84% of the population.

There were 383 households, out of which 29.2% had children under the age of 18 living with them, 60.1% were married couples living together, 8.6% had a female householder with no husband present, and 29.2% were non-families. 25.1% of all households were made up of individuals, and 9.4% had someone living alone who was 65 years of age or older. The average household size was 2.41 and the average family size was 2.86.

In the town, the population was spread out, with 23.2% under the age of 18, 5.1% from 18 to 24, 28.5% from 25 to 44, 30.3% from 45 to 64, and 12.9% who were 65 years of age or older. The median age was 41 years. For every 100 females, there were 88.5 males. For every 100 females age 18 and over, there were 91.9 males.

The median income for a household in the town was $51,719, and the median income for a family was $60,147. Males had a median income of $38,125 versus $27,222 for females. The per capita income for the town was $26,047. About 4.8% of families and 6.5% of the population were below the poverty line, including 3.7% of those under age 18 and 8.2% of those age 65 or over.

== Honda ==
The Honda Motor Company manufactures general purpose engines, walk-behind lawn mowers, snow blowers, string trimmers, water pumps, and tillers in Swepsonville.

== History ==
Swepsonville was named for the builder of a mill on the western side of town. Swepson disappeared one night with a considerable amount of money and soon established a mill in the North. The old mill, unused for many years, burned down in 1989 in a ten-alarm fire which brought firetrucks from all surrounding counties, was visible from the freeway 3 miles away, and made the national news.

A major league ballplayer, Dusty Cooke, came from Swepsonville. He played for the Yankees, the Red Sox and the Reds from 1930 to 1938, and managed the Phillies in 1948.

== Notable person ==
- Dusty Cooke, Major League Baseball player and manager

== Works cited ==
- Powell, William S. (1976). The North Carolina Gazetteer: A Dictionary of Tar Heel Places. Chapel Hill: University of North Carolina Press. ISBN 9780807812471. OCLC 733691912.
