= Alvin Gladstone Bennett =

Jamaican writer (1918–2004)

Alvin Gladstone Bennett (1918–2004), also known as A. G. Bennett, was a Jamaican journalist, novelist, and poet. Born in Falmouth, Trelawny Parish, he left his job as a purser in 1954 to become a journalist for The Gleaner. His newspaper columns were often witty and offered "acerbic comments on the affairs of God and humanity". In 1958, he was posted to Britain as the newspaper's British correspondent. He was also a contributor to the South London Press. While in Britain, Bennett engaged in community service; his interactions with the Caribbean immigrant community would inspire his first novel, Because They Know Not, published in 1959. His second satirical novel God the Stonebreaker was published in 1964. Some of his short stories were broadcast by the BBC in the 1960s and 1970s. Bennett was also a prolific poet. His poem, "The Black Man", was published in the Jamaican newspaper Public Opinion in June 1942, whereas his undated anthology of poems, titled Out of Darkness, "displays a degree of irreverence similar to that of his novels", but comprises "conservative" poetry that is "traditional in structure". In 1982, he relocated to Canada, where he would spend the remainder of his life.
