= Augustus G. Bennett =

American Civil War Union officier (1836–1897)

Augustus Griffin Bennett (15 May 1836 – 8 August 1897) was an American soldier who was a commanding officer in the Union Army during the American Civil War. He led "colored" soldiers in the 3rd South Carolina Volunteer Infantry Regiment (Colored). He took control of Charleston, South Carolina after rebels departed.

== Personal life ==
Bennett was born in Oneida County, New York to Julius Bennett and Charlotte Bennett. His father died when he was 9 and his mother remarried. He moved to Oswego, New York at age 18 and became a carpenter.

He later moved to California. He died in Santa Clara County following a long illness, aged 61.

== Career ==
Bennett enrolled in the Union Army in Oswego on August 25, 1861 and mustered in as First Lieutenant. He served with the 81st "Second Oswego" regiment becoming a lieutenant. He was captain of the regiment's Company B. He and other officers were subsequently promoted to command positions in the 21st United States Colored Infantry Regiment. Soldiers in his regiment protested their receiving half the pay of white soldiers and laid down their rifles. Sergeant William Walker was court martialed and convicted after the incident of mutiny. He was executed in the presence of the entire brigade.

He commanded the retaking of Fort Sumter and accepted the surrender of Charleston, South Carolina. Charleston mayor Charles Macbeth sent a delegation led by Aldermen W. H. Gilliland and George W. Williams to greet Bennett's 21st Regiment United States Colored Infantry and request their assistance after chaos and fires ensued in the wake of the Confederate Army's departure from Charleston.

Bennett was honorably discharged from the service on April 25, 1866. He married Mary E. Jones., the daughter of his regiment's chaplain, in 1867. The couple moved to Jersey City, New Jersey and then the West Coast. Bennett served on the San Jose City Council and Board of Education. Augustus Griffing Bennett Jr. studied to become a dentist in San Jose.

He was a member of the masons. April 11, 1906, his widow's pension of $30 per month was approved.

Captain Henry Sharp's report to him on December 4, 1864 survives. The Massachusetts Historical Society has a photo of him.
