= Ceburn L. Harris =

Ceburn Lemuel Harris (August 6, 1822 – July 2, 1908) was an American politician.

== Early life ==
Ceburn Lemuel Harris was born in Rutherford County, North Carolina, on August 6, 1822.

He married Susan S. Logan on November 11, 1846.

Harris served as a colonel of the Confederate Home Guard during the American Civil War. He often disagreed with state leaders over orders and military regulations.

== Political career ==
=== Early activities ===
Harris was elected to the North Carolina Senate in 1863, representing the 48th district, to fill a vacancy created by the resignation of M. O. Dickerson. Seated on November 23, he served from then until 1864. He was elected and served as a delegate at the state's 1865 constitutional convention, being pardoned for his service to the Confederacy by U.S. President Andrew Johnson so that he could participate. He was elected to the Senate again in 1865, representing the 48th district. He was reelected in 1866 and served until 1867. He advised North Carolina Provisional Governor William Woods Holden on the reorganization of Rutherford County's government in the aftermath of the Civil War.

=== Creation of the North Carolina Republican Party ===
In December 1866, Harris joined Holden and several other North Carolina politicians on a trip to Washington D.C. to meet with Radical Republicans and discuss the possible creation of a state chapter of the Republican Party in North Carolina. Holden, Harris, and various other white Unionist politicians in North Carolina caucused in early March 1867 to organize a convention to prepare for a new constitution and facilitate North Carolina's full readmission into the Union. Plans were drawn up to hold a convention at the North Carolina State Capitol on March 27, and 156 white delegates were formally invited. At the behest of the committee, Harris also reached out to black political leaders. The Unionist convention opened on March 27 in the House of Commons Hall of the State Capitol. Harris called the convention to order. The assembly proceeded to declare the creation of the North Carolina Republican Party, adopt a party platform, and frame an organizational apparatus.

=== Superintendent of Public Works ===
For the 1868 elections, Holden persuaded Harris to accept the Republican nomination for the office of Superintendent of Public Works instead of pursuing appointment as the president of the North Carolina Railroad. Harris was elected to the post and served for four years. In August 1868, the North Carolina General Assembly passed a law to form a committee to acquire a site for the construction of a state penitentiary. Harris was made an ex officio member of it and at its first meeting on September 14 he was elected its chairman. The body subsequently fielded 13 potential sites before deciding to secure a 25-acre prison site and a proximate 8,000-acre property at Lockville in Chatham County. Harris was the only member of the committee to visit the site in person. (Note: Pursuant to this purchase, Harris began negotiations with the negotiations with the superintendent of the Tredegar Iron Works of Richmond, Virginia, for the exploitation of local iron deposits by prisoners.) Problems with the poor quality of the property led the General Assembly to write off the purchase and in 1869 passed new legislation to build a prison in or around Raleigh. They created a new committee to oversee the construction and staffing of the penitentiary with Harris as one of its members. He declined the appointment and was replaced at its first meeting. In late 1870, he undertook an inspection of the North Carolina Railroad, finding it largely in good condition.

A feud erupted in 1869 between Harris and Holden over which official held the prerogative to appoint directors and proxies to railroad companies in which the state held a financial stake. In April 1869, the General Assembly passed a law which gave the superintendent of public works charge over all state interests in public works, including railroads and empowered him to cast votes with or appoint proxies to boards of directors of corporations in which the state held interest. Harris actively pursued his new responsibilities and attended a shareholders' meeting of the Atlantic and North Carolina Railroad in June.

Holden resisted Harris' attempts to assert his authority over state-invested railroads, backed by North Carolina Railroad President William Smith and Attorney General Lewis P. Olds. In anticipation of the North Carolina Railroad shareholders meeting to take place in July, Smith secured an injunction from a favorable judge barring Harris from participating on the grounds that the charter of the railroad specifically gave the governor control over the state's interest in the corporation. In response, Harris obtained an injunction from his political ally and brother-in-law, Judge George Washington Logan, preventing Holden's appointed proxy, Byron Laflin, from participating. Both men appeared at the meeting to press their cases. Ultimately, the shareholders of the North Carolina Railroad voted overwhelmingly to reject Harris' case. Later meetings of the shareholders of the Western North Carolina Railroad and the Wilmington, Charlotte and Rutherford Railroad also rejected Harris' authority. Ensuing litigation brought the issue before the North Carolina Supreme Court by the end of the year. Lacking the requisite funds to argue his suit, Harris appealed to legislators to clarify their intent in the relevant law. In March 1870, the General Assembly modified state law to permit the governor to appoint directors and proxies to all railroads chartered before the 1868 constitution. Since all operational railroads in the state were founded before that time, the amendment was a de facto political victory for Holden.

The office was abolished by constitutional amendment in 1873.

=== Later activities ===
Harris' political career dwindled at the end of the Reconstruction era. At the state Republican convention in 1872, he was offered alongside seven other men as a candidate for the office of lieutenant governor. The party nomination was ultimately awarded to Curtis H. Brogden. He later served as mayor of Rutherfordton as a Populist but was defeated for re-election in May 1894.

== Later life ==
Harris died at his son's home in Raleigh on July 2, 1908.

== Works cited ==
- Beckel, Deborah (2010). Radical Reform: Interracial Politics in Post-Emancipation North Carolina. University of Virginia Press. ISBN 9780813930527.
- Cheney, John L. Jr., ed. (1981). North Carolina Government, 1585-1979: A Narrative and Statistical History (revised ed.). Raleigh: North Carolina Secretary of State. OCLC 1290270510.
- Cole, J. Timothy (2016). The Forest City Lynching of 1900: Populism, Racism, and White Supremacy in Rutherford County, North Carolina. Jefferson: McFarland. ISBN 978-0-7864-8040-1.
- Hamilton, Joseph Grégoire de Roulhac (1914). Reconstruction in North Carolina. New York: Columbia University. ISBN 9780231925549 – via Google Books.
- Nash, Steven E. (2016). Reconstruction's Ragged Edge: The Politics of Postwar Life in the Southern Mountains. Chapel Hill: The University of North Carolina Press. ISBN 9781469626246.
- Raper, Horace W. (1985). William W. Holden: North Carolina's Political Enigma. Chapel Hill: University of North Carolina Press. ISBN 0807850608.
- Taylor, Gregory S. (2021). Central Prison : A History of North Carolina's State Penitentiary. Baton Rouge: Louisiana State University Press. ISBN 9780807174876.
- Trelease, Allen W. (1991). The North Carolina Railroad, 1849–1871, and the Modernization of North Carolina. Fred W. Morrison Series in Southern Studies. University of North Carolina Press. ISBN 9780807819418.
