= Granite Mill (Haw River, North Carolina) =

- U.S. National Register of Historic Places
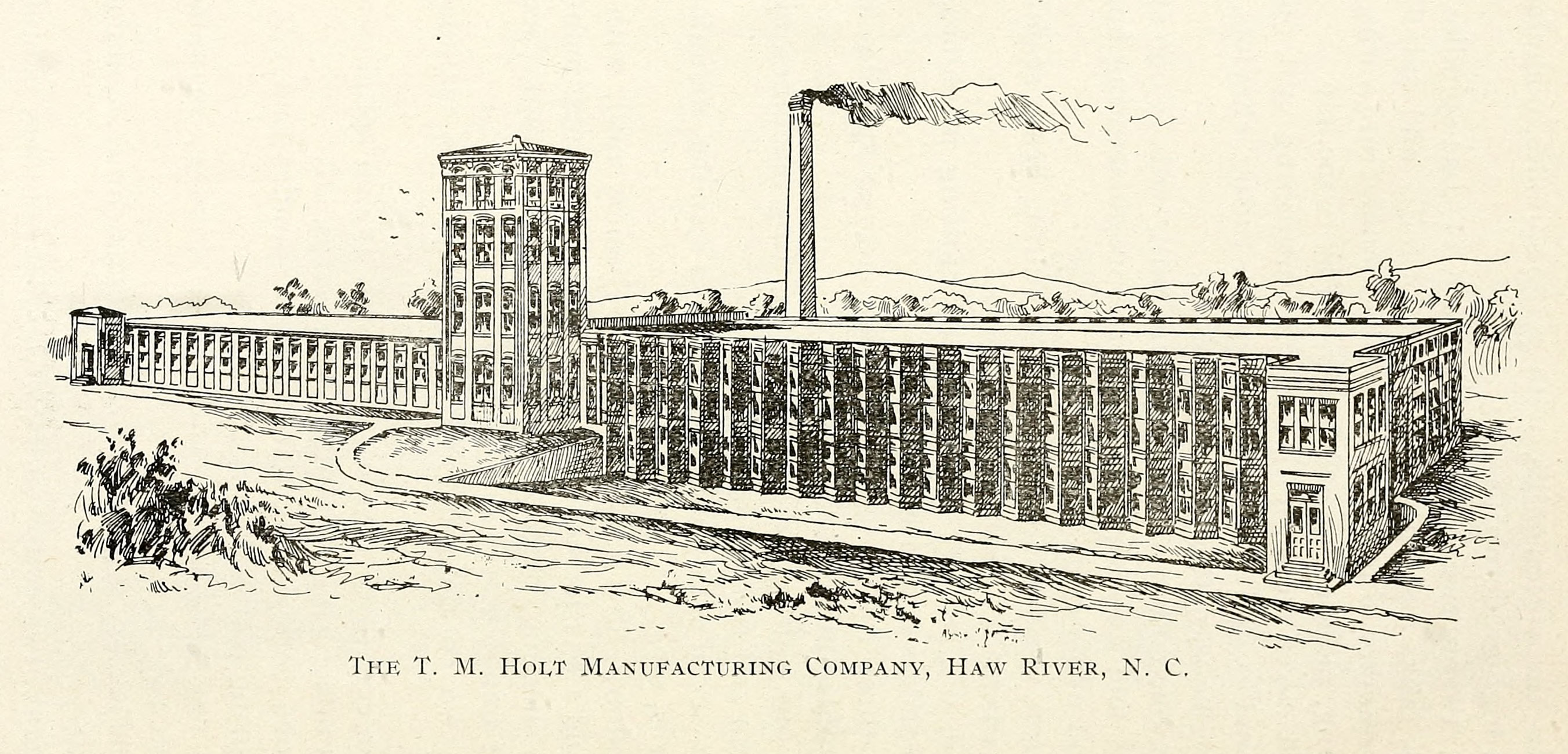
- A print depicting the original mill, published in 1897.
- Location: Haw River, North Carolina
- Area: Approximately 31 acres
- Built: 1844
- NRHP reference No.: 100001627
- Added to NRHP: September 18, 2017

The Granite Mill is a historic building located in Haw River, North Carolina. It is a complex of interconnected and free-standing manufacturing and storage buildings built between 1844 and 1990. The original mill was built in 1884.

== History ==
In 1837, Edwin Michael Holt and William A. Carrigan established Holt and Carrigan Cotton Factory, with Holt later becoming the sole owner. Holt was one of the first southern cotton manufacturers to manufacture colored cloth on a power loom. His fabrics became known as "Alamance Plaids."

In 1844, Benjamin Trollinger constructed Granite Mill, yet a lack of commerce in Haw River led to its foreclosure and sale. In 1858, Edwin Holt and his son Thomas Holt, who later became the Governor of North Carolina, purchased the Granite Mill.

The Holt family dominated the region's textile industry for most of the 19th and early 20th centuries. The family continued to construct more mills and expand their business. In 1893, the Holt family owned 10 of the 19 cotton mills in the county. By 1919, the Holt family owned 23 out of the county's 27 textiles miles. In 1917, the mill was reorganized with the Holt family's other acquisitions to be Holt-Granite-Puritan Mills Company, a cotton dress goods producer.

In 1927, economic troubles caused the sale of the mill to Proximity Manufacturing Company (later Cone Mills Corporation) for $295,100. The mill began producing corduroy, grey moleskin, and suede. By 1931, a strong community had sprung up around the mill, including homes for workers and company-funded schools. In the late 1970s, Granite Mills generated the world's largest output of corduroy.

Until 1997, the mill maintained chamois and flat cloth dying and finishing operations. In 2004, the property was sold and used as industrial storage. In 2020, the mill and surrounding area was nominated to be recognized by the National Register of Historic Places.
