= Stewart Ellison =

American politician

North Carolina House of Representatives
- In office 1870–1874
- In office 1879–1880

Personal details
- Born: March 8, 1834
- Died: October 24, 1899 (aged 65)

Stewart Ellison (March 8, 1834 – October 24, 1899) was an American building contractor and state legislator in North Carolina.

== Biography ==
Ellison was born enslaved on March 8, 1834 in Beaufort County, North Carolina. He was owned by Abner F. Neal. He took up a carpentry apprenticeship at thirteen years of age with Marrs Newton, a free mulatto mechanic in Washington, to serve for seven years. He learned to read and write in his free time.

Around July 1852 Ellison travelled to Raleigh, North Carolina to work on several construction projects. This included several buildings on Fayetteville Street and months of work on the North Carolina Hospital for the Insane. He returned to Washington in December 1854 where he lived until 1862 when he moved to Raleigh. He worked as both a builder and also as a merchant and a jailer.

Ellison was elected to Raleigh’s board of commissioners in 1869 and was the first black man in this position.

He served in the North Carolina House of Representatives from 1870 until 1874 and from 1879 until 1880. In 1876 he had declined the nomination. He was a member of several committees during his service including the Education committee, the Deaf, Dumb, and Blind committee and the Public Buildings committee.

In June 1874, Ellison spoke in favor of a national civil rights bill under consideration by Congress. By June he was publicly voicing skepticism, as the legislation's unpopularity grew.

In the 1870s he served as director of the state penitentiary for three terms appointed by governor Curtis Hooks Brogden. He also worked as a janitor in a building he helped build and as a dining room attendant at the Yarborough House. In the 1880s, Raleigh Postmaster John Nichols hired him to work as a postal clerk at the behest of James H. Harris.

He had been married to Mary Davis with whom he had three daughters and then later in 1866 he married Narcissa Lucas.

Ellison died October 24, 1899 aged 65 after being in poor health for several years.

== See also ==
- African American officeholders from the end of the Civil War until before 1900

== Works cited ==
- Beckel, Deborah (2010). Radical Reform: Interracial Politics in Post-Emancipation North Carolina. University of Virginia Press. ISBN 9780813930527.
- Friedlander, Alan; Gerber, Richard Allen (2018). Welcoming Ruin : The Civil Rights Act of 1875 (ebook ed.). Brill. ISBN 9789004384071.
