= 21st United States Colored Infantry Regiment =

The 21st United States Colored Infantry Regiment was a U.S.C.T. infantry regiment in the Union Army during the American Civil War. It was organized from the 3rd South Carolina Infantry (African Descent) and the 4th South Carolina Infantry (African Descent) in March 1864 under the command of Col. Milton S. Littlefield. It served in South Carolina and Georgia until the end of the war; it was mustered out in October 1866.

== Surrender of Charleston ==
The 21st United States Colored Infantry Regiment were the first to enter the city of Charleston, South Carolina following the mayor's surrender on February 18, 1865.

== See also ==
- List of United States Colored Troops Civil War units

== Sources ==
- South Carolina Civil War soldiers website
