= 4th South Carolina Colored Infantry Regiment =

- South Carolina state flag
- Active: July 1863–March 14, 1864
- Country: United States
- Allegiance: United States of America; Union
- Branch: Infantry
- Role: Duty
- Garrison/HQ: Fernandina, Florida
- Engagements: None

The 4th South Carolina Colored Infantry Regiment was an African-American infantry regiment that served in the Union Army during the American Civil War.

== Service ==
The 4th South Carolina Infantry was organized at Fernandina, Florida and mustered into Federal service in July 1863.

The regiment initially conducted fatigue and guard duty at Fernandina, Florida until February 1864, when it moved to Hilton Head, South Carolina, performing duty, before moving to Jacksonville, Florida to conduct its final assignment of duty until consolidation in March, 1864.

The regiment was consolidated with 3rd South Carolina to form the 21st United States Colored Infantry Regiment on March 14, 1864.

== Commanders ==
- Milton S. Littlefield - Colonel
- Thomas J. Robinson - Regimental Adjutant

== See also ==
- List of Union South Carolina Civil War Units
- South Carolina in the American Civil War
