= William Alexander Smith (politician) =

American politician

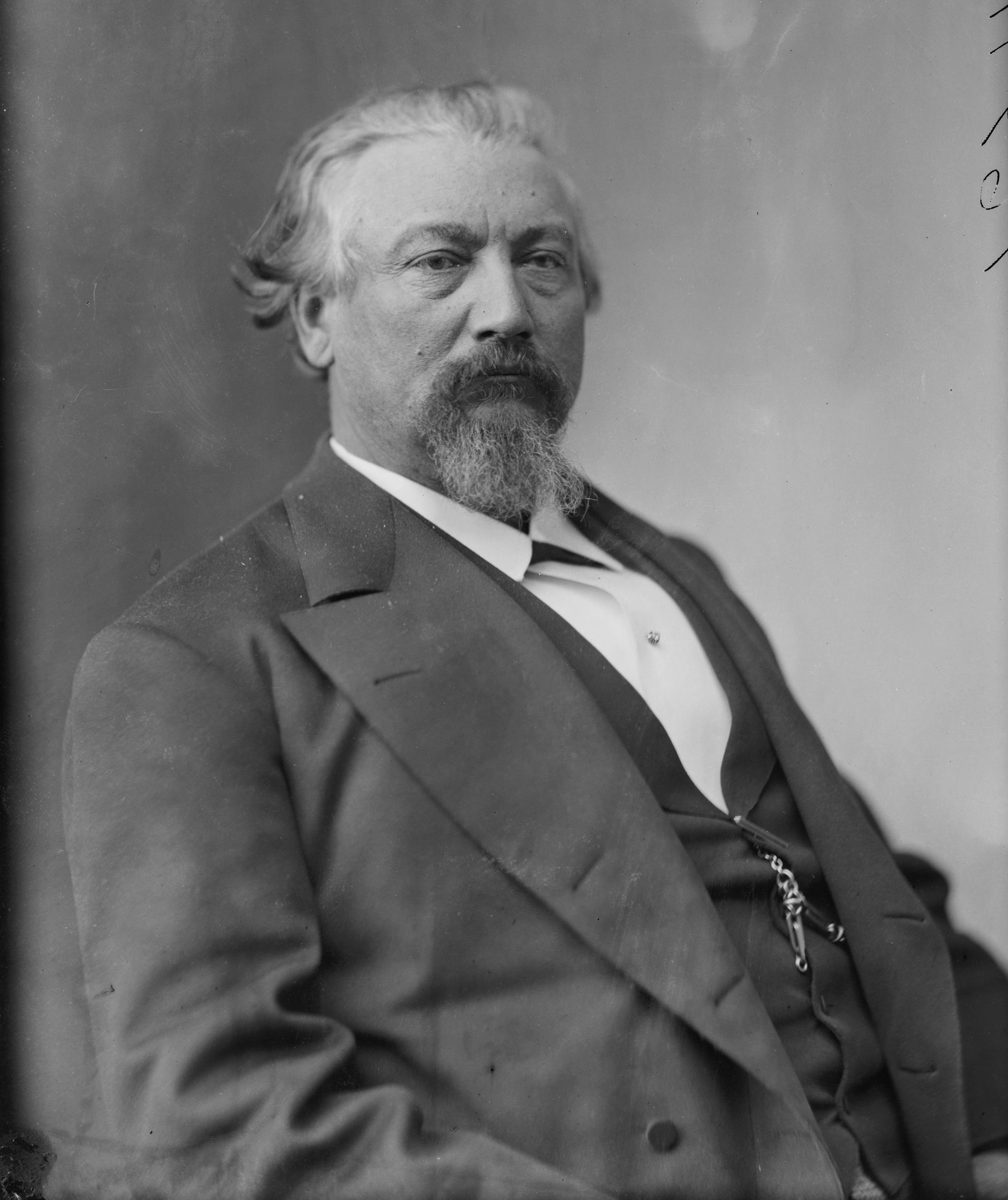

Member of the U.S. House of Representatives from North Carolina's 4th district
- In office March 4, 1873 – March 3, 1875

Personal details
- Born: January 9, 1828 Warren County, North Carolina
- Died: May 16, 1888 (aged 60) Richmond, Virginia
- Resting place: Hollywood Cemetery

William Alexander Smith (January 9, 1828 – May 16, 1888) was a U.S. Representative from the state of North Carolina.

Smith was born in Warren County, North Carolina and attended the common schools. He engaged in agricultural pursuits and was a member of the State constitutional convention in 1865 following the American Civil War. He was a member of the North Carolina State Senate in 1870. He was president of the North Carolina Railroad in 1868 and of the Yadkin River Railroad. He was elected as a Republican from the 4th District to the Forty-third Congress, serving from March 4, 1873 to March 3, 1875. Smith died in Richmond, Virginia and is interred in the city's Hollywood Cemetery.

His home near Smithfield, North Carolina, the Atkinson-Smith House, was listed on the National Register of Historic Places in 1975.

Party political offices
Preceded by Curtis Hooks Brogden	Republican nominee for Lieutenant Governor of North Carolina; 1876	Succeeded by Rufus Barringer
U.S. House of Representatives
Preceded by Sion H. Rogers	Member of the U.S. House of Representatives from North Carolina's 4th congressional district 1873–1875	Succeeded by Joseph J. Davis
