= List of African American newspapers in Georgia =

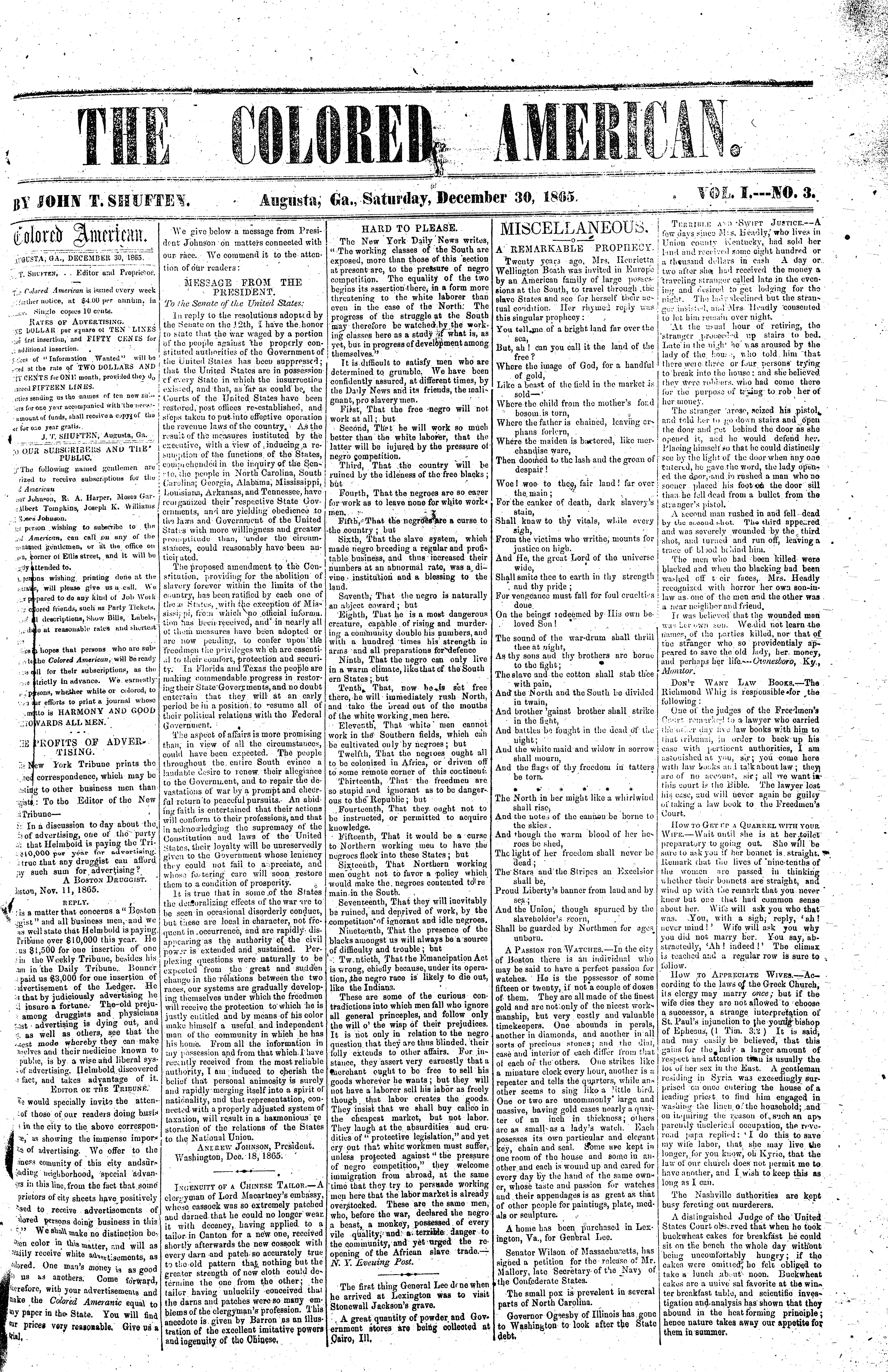
The Colored American of Augusta, Georgia, from December 30, 1865.

This is a list of African American newspapers that have been published in Georgia. It includes both current and historical newspapers. The first such newspaper in Georgia was The Colored American, founded in Augusta in 1865. However, most were founded in Atlanta.

While most such newspapers in Georgia have been very short-lived, a few, such as the Savannah Tribune, Atlanta Daily World, Savannah Herald, and Atlanta Inquirer, have had extensive influence over many decades.

Newspapers that are currently published are highlighted in green in the list below.

== Newspapers ==
City	Title	Beginning	End	Frequency	Call numbers	Remarks
Albany	The Albany Southwest Georgian; Southwest Georgian	1938	current	Weekly	LCCN sn98062571; OCLC 27819689	Official site
Albany	The Albany Times	1960s	?	Weekly	LCCN sn91074129; OCLC 8730665	
Athens	Athens Blade	1879	1880	Weekly	LCCN sn88054120, sn94089964; OCLC 20236858, 32521825	
Athens	The Athens Clipper	1888	1900s	Weekly	LCCN sn88054119; OCLC 20236763	Attested from 1901.
Athens	The Athens Republique	1919	?	Weekly	LCCN 2012233098; OCLC 812195741	Attested from 1923.
Athens	Athens Voice	1975	1900s		LCCN sn91099196; OCLC 17936844	
Athens	The Progressive Era	1899		Semimonthly	LCCN sn89053508; OCLC 20175459	
Atlanta	Atlanta Age	1898	1908	Weekly	LCCN 2011254045, sn82014241; OCLC 715404419, 8790269	
Atlanta	The Crusader	1967	1900s	Weekly	LCCN sn89053535; OCLC 20281090	
Atlanta	The Crusader	1963	?	Biweekly	LCCN sn90052121; OCLC 12006752	
Atlanta	Atlanta Daily World; Atlanta World (1928–1932)	1928 or 1932	current	4 times a week or Semiweekly	LCCN sn82015425; OCLC 8807951; ISSN 1528-6142; Atlanta World: LCCN sn85047544; OCLC 2257938; ISSN 2473-5892	Official site
Atlanta	Atlanta Independent	1903	1928	Weekly	LCCN sn84025917; OCLC 10691650	
Atlanta	The Atlanta Inquirer	1960	current	Weekly	LCCN sn88063050; OCLC 6657707, 8002694; ISSN 2574-867X	Official site; Published by John B. Smith.
Atlanta	The People's Crusader	1972?	?	Weekly		Published by Martin Luther King Jr. Peoples Church of Love.
Atlanta	Georgia Sentinel	1989	current	Weekly		Official site; Published by Andre Moses White. Edited by Andre R. White.
Atlanta	The Southern Courier	1965	1968	Weekly	LCCN 2010233919, sn84025852; OCLC 10462102, 656281517	
Atlanta	The Southern Recorder	1886?	1888?	Weekly		Edited by H.M. Turner.
Atlanta	The Atlanta Times	1890	?	Weekly	LCCN sn89070060; OCLC 19568648	Reuben Shannon Lovinggood was editor and part owner.
Atlanta	Voice Of Missions; Voice of Missions: By Way of the Cross	1893	1900	Monthly newspaper	LCCN sn83016234; OCLC 1069294, 2773855, 9637716	Edited by H.M. Turner and H.B. Parks.
Atlanta	The Voice Of The People; Voice of the People	1901	1918?	Monthly newspaper	LCCN sn95061008; OCLC 32029432	Published by the Colored National Emigration Association.; Edited by Henry McNeal Turner.
Atlanta	The Atlanta Voice	1966	current	Weekly	LCCN sn84025806; OCLC 11861221, 4423131	Published by Janis L. Ware.
Atlanta	The Weekly Defiance	1881	1889	Weekly	LCCN 2013254357, sn83016184, sn94090636; OCLC 2774158, 32585167, 849371167, 9612325	Published by Brown & Barnett.
Augusta	The Colored American	1865	1866	Weekly	LCCN 2011254290, sn82014351; OCLC 745910936, 8780206	Founded by John T. Shuften, who was forced to sell the paper within six months.; Published by John T. Shapiro.
Augusta	The Echo	1914?	?	Weekly		
Augusta	Augusta Focus	1980s	?	Weekly	LCCN sn83004595; OCLC 10052848; ISSN 0746-4657	Attested through at least 1993.
Augusta	The Loyal Georgian	1866 or 1867	1868 or 1867	Daily	LCCN sn83016180, 2011254291; OCLC 745920021, 9608744	Official organ of the Georgia Educational Association and Republican Party.
Augusta	The Metro Courier; Metro County Courier (1984–1991)	1981	current	Weekly	OCLC 23068239	Published by Barbara Gordon.
Augusta	Augusta News-Review; The Augusta News-Review; The News-Review	1971	1985	Weekly	LCCN sn88054027, sn88054028, sn88054928; OCLC 18425927, 5427261	Published by Mallory K. Millender.
Augusta	Southern Christian Advocate	1800s	1800s	Weekly	LCCN sn87065702; OCLC 16752598	
Augusta	The Augusta Union	1889	1904	Weekly	LCCN 2011254047, 770640224, sn83016240; OCLC 2639795, 2715348, 715390994	
Augusta	The Loyal Georgian; The Weekly Loyal Georgian	1866 or 1867	1868 or 1867	Weekly and daily editions	LCCN sn82016224, sn83027105, 2011254292; OCLC 745920975, 10129523, 9244954	
Augusta	The Weekly Review	1947	?	Weekly	LCCN sn88063054, sn94084531; OCLC 17436096, 32424647	Attested through at least 1970.
Brunswick	Brunswick Herald	1895?	?	Weekly	LCCN sn93059127; OCLC 27290510	Edited by A. Jasper Shootes.; Attested through at least 1904.
Columbus	Columbus Chronicle	1895	1900	Weekly	LCCN 2011254354, sn83016189; OCLC 2639475, 747720205, 9613829	Published by J.T. Coleman.
Columbus	Family	1990	?	Bimonthly	OCLC 27979701	Published by Ophelia DeVore Associates.
Columbus	The Columbus Times	1961 or 1970	current	Weekly	LCCN sn89053331; OCLC 19534602	Official site; Published by Ophelia DeVore Mitchell.
Cordele	Southeastern News	1981?	?	Weekly	LCCN sn91074130; OCLC 10041505; ISSN 1078-7607	Published by Eugene Rutland.; Attested through at least 1995.
Decatur	The Champion Newspaper	1900s	current	Weekly	LCCN 00211074; OCLC 43209784; ISSN 1528-042X	Official site
Fort Valley	Fort Valley Herald	1986	current	Weekly	LCCN sn91074173; OCLC 32525663	Published by Atlantic Communications of Georgia.
Kingsland	The South Georgia Journal	?	?	Weekly	LCCN 2009233103; OCLC 312083377	Attested through at least 2008.
Macon	The Macon Community Enterprise	1955 or 1970s	1990?	Monthly newspaper	LCCN sn88054043; OCLC 18702127	Published by A.M.E. Churches of Georgia.
Macon	The Macon Courier	1974	?	Weekly	LCCN sn88054044; OCLC 18702091	Published by Melvin Williams.; Attested through at least 1993.
Macon	Georgia Informer	1982	current	Monthly	OCLC 31457114	Official site; Published by Herbert Dennard.
Macon	Macon Metro Times	1968?	1993	Weekly		Published by Harris Walker Jr.
Macon	The Negro Progress; Progress	1929	1948?	Monthly newspaper		Published by Memorial Institutional Church. Edited by J.T. Saxon.
Macon	Macon Reporter	1964	Ceased publication 2017 or earlier. See notes.	Weekly	LCCN sn91099178; OCLC 24606088	In approximately 2017 the name "Macon Reporter" was taken over by Local Government Information Services, a Pink-slime journalism conservative advocacy operation.
Macon	The Macon Sentinel	1899	1900s	Weekly	LCCN 2013254313, sn83016188; OCLC 2753937, 844058109, 9613561	"Official organ of the Georgia Colored Industrial Orphans' Home."
Macon	The Macon Times	1900s	?	Weekly	LCCN sc82005306; OCLC 8622118; ISSN 0735-729X	
Savannah	The Savannah Banner	1963	?	Irregular	LCCN sn90052133; OCLC 21065578	Published by Abram Eisenman.
Savannah	Freedom's Journal	1991		Bimonthly	OCLC 31793208	Published by Shabazz Publishing Company.
Savannah	Savannah Herald; The Herald	1945	current	Weekly	LCCN sn89077295, sn97046024; OCLC 36404952, 2261869	Official site
Savannah	The Savannah Journal	1919?	?	Unknown		
Savannah	The Savannah Sentinel	1962	?	Weekly	LCCN sn90052194; OCLC 21347180	Published by Houston L. Tolbert.
Savannah	The Savannah Tribune; The Colored Tribune (1875–1876)	1875	current	Weekly	LCCN sn82016225, sn84020323, 2014254301, sn91074131, 2014254320; OCLC 878986686, 25433402, 664153071, 8107226, 9245018	Founded by Sol Johnson and John H. Deveaux.; Official site
Savannah	Savannah Weekly Echo	1879	1884	Weekly	LCCN 2014254317, sn83016195; OCLC 2789478, 878987317, 9618146	Published by Hardin Bros.
Thomasville	The Thomasville News; The Progress News	1967	1967	Weekly	LCCN sn84025918, sn84025919; OCLC 10691097, 10691105	Published by D.L. Inman.; Attested through at least 1978.
Thomasville	The T T News	1967	?	Weekly	LCCN sn99026799; OCLC 41271956	
Union City	Atlanta News Leader	1991?	current	Weekly	OCLC 30858162	Published by Rochelle Render Pannell. Edited by Lee R. Haven.; Weekly paid circulation of 13,515 as of 2018.
Waycross	The Gazette and Land Bulletin	1896	1900s	Weekly	LCCN sn83016194; OCLC 2774101, 9617038	
Waycross	South Georgia Times	1936	?	Weekly	OCLC 36174142	Edited by Lloyd H. King.
Waycross	The Waycross Tribune	1915?	?	Weekly		Edited by Isaac Gainus.

== See also ==
- List of African American newspapers and media outlets
- List of African American newspapers in Alabama
- List of African American newspapers in Florida
- List of African American newspapers in North Carolina
- List of African American newspapers in South Carolina
- List of African American newspapers in Tennessee
- List of newspapers in Georgia (U.S. state)

== Works cited ==
- Danky, James Philip; Hady, Maureen E., eds. (1998). African-American newspapers and periodicals: a national bibliography. Harvard University Press. ISBN 9780674007888.
- Pride, Armistead Scott; Wilson, Clint C. (1997). A History of the Black Press. Howard University Press. ISBN 9780882581927.
- Smith, Jessie Carney (2012). Black Firsts: 4,000 Ground-Breaking and Pioneering Historical Events. Visible Ink Press. ISBN 9781578593699.
