= Al Hester =

American historian

Albert L. Hester (May 31, 1932 - April 11, 2019) was a professor of journalism at the University of Georgia (UGA), a columnist, historian, newspaper reporter, and author. He wrote more than ten books including Gospel Pilgrim Cemetery: An African-American Historical Site about the Gospel Pilgrim Cemetery for African Americans in Athens, Georgia, and Enduring Legacy: Clarke County, Georgia's Ex-Slave Legislators Madison Davis and Alfred Richardson about Madison Davis and Alfred Richardson. He wrote Athens, Georgia, Celebrating Two Hundred Years at the Millenium with his wife Conoly Hester, who is also a writer and editor. He also authored some 200 articles.

He was a professor emeritus of the Journalism Department at UGA's Henry W. Grady College of Journalism and Mass Communication. He was Journalism Department chair and director of the Cox International Center for Mass Communication Training and Research, which he founded. It was funded with support from James M. Cox Jr. and provides training and research in support of international journalism. He retired from the University of Georgia in 1997.

During his career in journalism, Hester was a reporter and editor for the Dallas Times Herald in Dallas, Texas, for 13 years.

== Education ==
Hester received a degree in journalism from Southern Methodist University in Dallas and a master of journalism degree from the University of Wisconsin in Madison, Wisconsin, where he also received his Ph.D. in mass communication.

== Partial bibliography ==
- Hester, Albert L. (2015). Putting on Blue: Confederates from the Athens, Georgia, Area Who Became Galvanized Yankees. Athens, Georgia: Athens Historical Society & The Green Berry Pres. ISBN 9780996639903.
- Hester, Albert Lee (2010). Enduring Legacy: Clarke County Georgia's Ex-Slave Legislators Madison Davis and Alfred Richardson. Athens, GA: Green Berry Press. ISBN 9780967302782.
- Hester, Albert L. (February 2004). Gospel Pilgrim Cemetery: An African-American Historic Site. Athens, GA: Green Berry Press. OCLC 262742754.
- Hester, Al (Fall 2004). "Gospel Pilgrim Cemetery: A Rich Resource in African-American History". Athens Historian. 9. Athens, GA: Athens Historical Society: 34–43. OCLC 36821172.
- Hester, Conoly; Hester, Albert L. (1999). Athens, Georgia : celebrating 200 years at the millennium. Montgomery, Alabama: Community Communications. ISBN 188535228X.
- Hester, Albert L. (1999). A preliminary sketch : the Galbraiths, from Gigha, Scotland to America. Athens, Georgia: Green Berry Press. ISBN 0967302749.
- Hester, Albert L.; To, Wai Lan J. (1987). Handbook for Third World journalists. Athens, Georgia: Center for International Mass Communication Training and Research, Henry W. Grady School of Journalism and Mass Communication, University of Georgia. ISBN 094308900X.
- Hester, Albert L.; Jones, Felecia; Gomez, Dolores (1986). A profile of Qatar News Agency : news flow in a government service, 1985. Athens, Georgia: Center for International Mass Communication Training and Research, Henry W. Grady School of Journalism and Mass Communication, University of Georgia. OCLC 34968842.
