= Gospel Pilgrim Cemetery =

Historic African American cemetery

- U.S. National Register of Historic Places
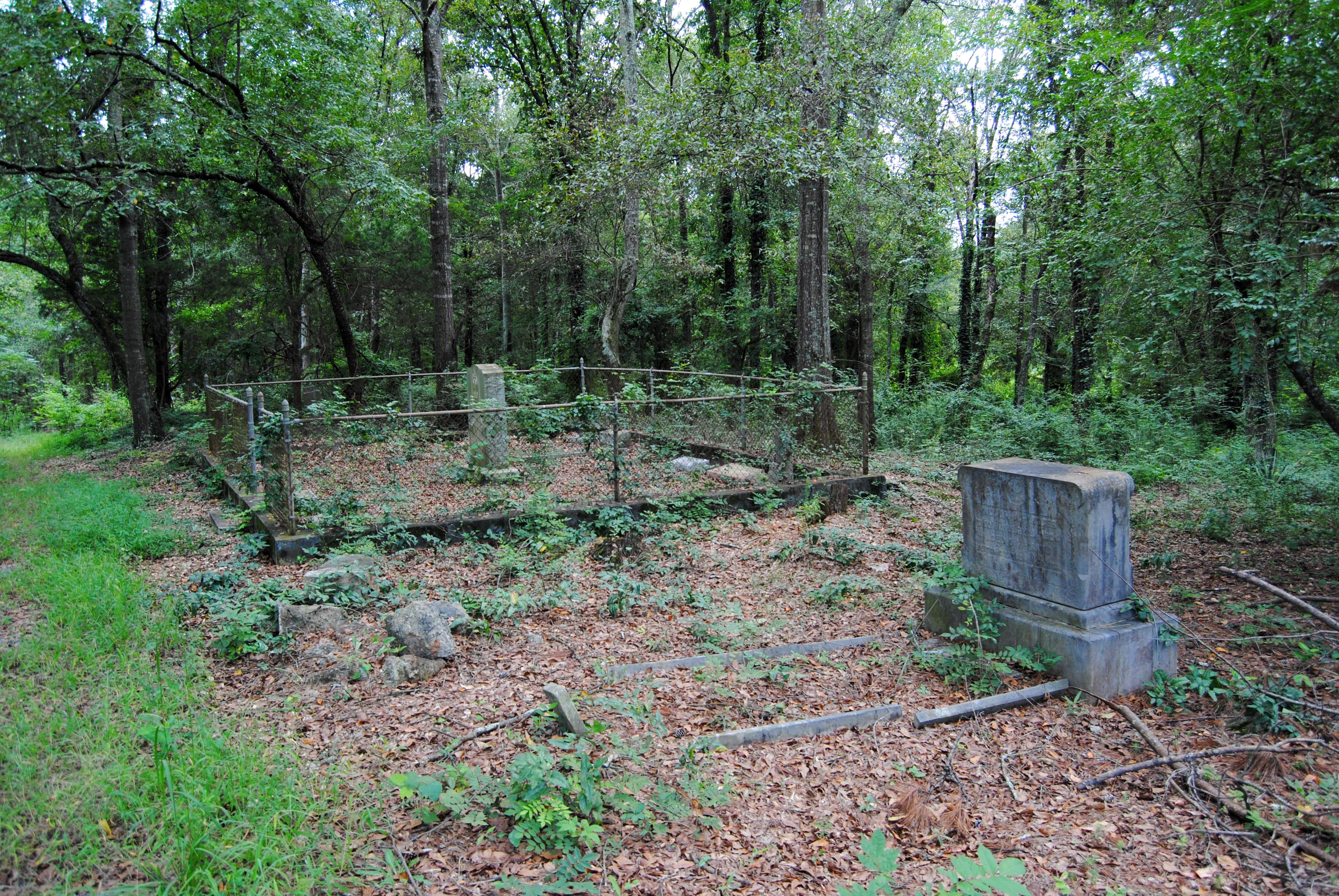
- Morton Family Plot in the Gospel Pilgrim Cemetery

- Location within Georgia Location within the United States
- Location: 530 Fourth Street; Athens, Georgia
- Coordinates: 33°58′11″N 83°21′42″W
- Area: 10.1 acres (4.1 ha)
- Built: 1882
- Website: www.gospelpilgrimcemetery.com
- NRHP reference No.: 06000285
- Added to NRHP: April 19, 2006

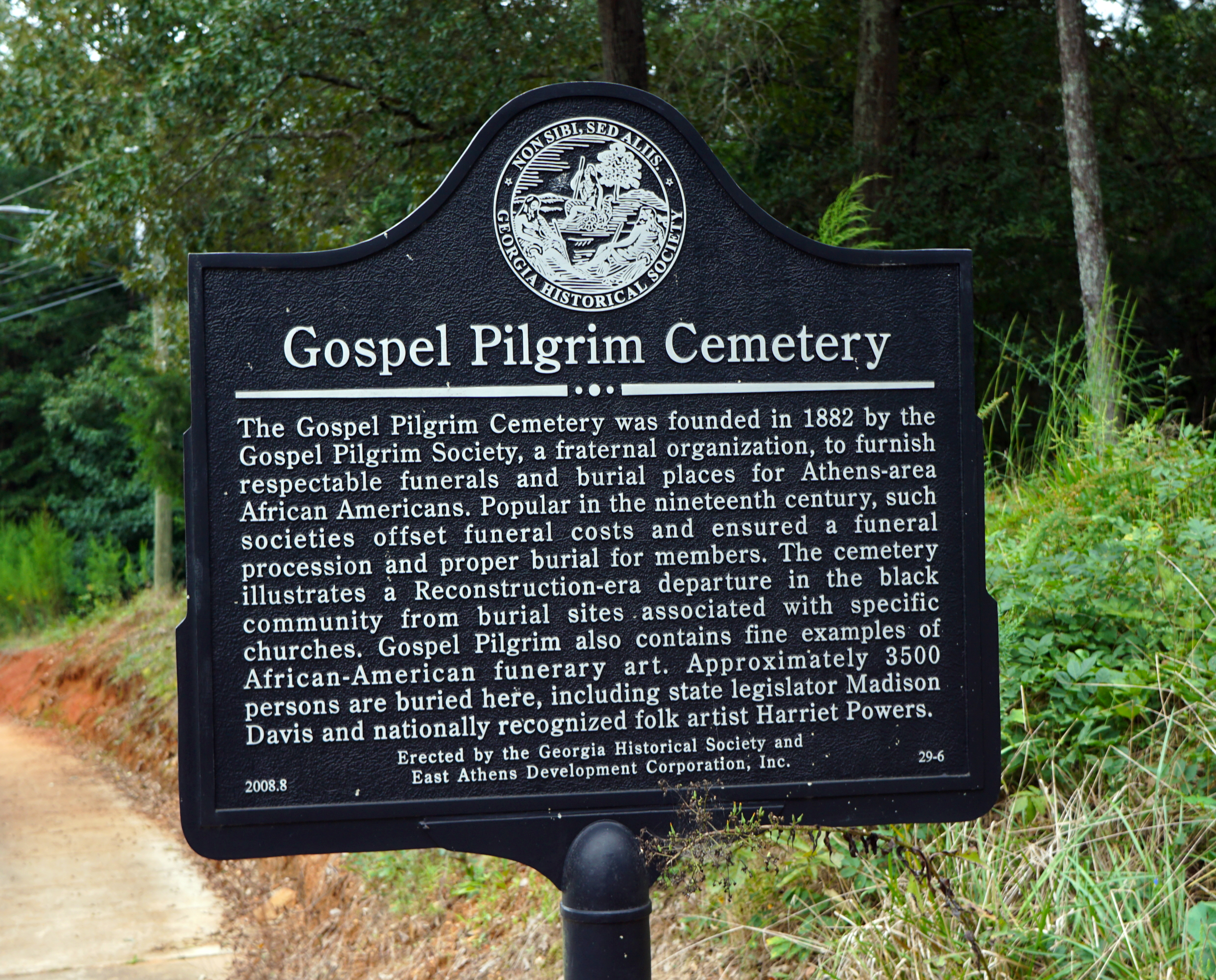
Gospel Pilgrim Cemetery Historical Marker, erected 2008, Athens, GA

Gospel Pilgrim Cemetery was founded in 1882 as a cemetery for African Americans in the 216th general militia district, Athens, Georgia area. Nine acres in size, it contains an estimated 3,500, mostly unmarked, graves.

The Gospel Pilgrim Society founded the cemetery and was "a social and charitable burial insurance organization". The site was listed on the National Register of Historic Places in 2006.

In 2008, the Georgia Historical Society, along with the East Athens Development Corporation, Inc., erected a Georgia Historical Marker at Gospel Pilgrim Cemetery. The marker is located at 4th Street, north of Evelyn C. Neely Drive in Athens.

== Gospel Pilgrim Society ==
Social and charitable lodges became very popular during the period after the Civil War. By 1912, the African-American community had eight orders – including the Gospel Pilgrims – with a total of 29 lodges in Athens, Georgia. The membership of these lodges totaled about 2,500 people that year, "or about 75 percent of the adult black population of Athens". The origin of the name, "Gospel Pilgrim", is unknown.

== Cemetery ==
In 1882, the Gospel Pilgrim Society purchased 8.25 acres from the estate of William P. Talmadge. He was a white blacksmith; his widow and executrix, Elizabeth Talmadge sold the property for $238.50. The deed lists the probably illiterate laborer, Green Bullock, as the president of the society at the time of the sale. In 1902, the society purchased an additional 0.75 acres from George P. Brightwell. Finally, in 1905, a 100'x60' parcel was transferred to neighboring Springfield Baptist Church to give the cemetery its current dimensions, bordering Fourth Street and what is now the Seaboard Airline Railway. A 2004 survey found the acreage to be 10.071 acres, slightly larger than given in the deeds.

The earliest burials date from 1885, and most of those are from the family of Monroe B. Morton a successful contractor, property owner, newspaper publisher, and developer whose Morton Building in Athens included the Morton Theatre and offices for African American professionals. Other smaller cemeteries for African Americans were associated with churches throughout the county, but Gospel Pilgrim was "Athens' first major cemetery controlled by African Americans." Burials were performed there regularly until the 1960s, with the peak decade being the 1940s. The cemetery fell into disuse and disrepair, probably due to lack of funding; the last burial took place in 2003.

Athens-Clarke County hired attorney Jim Warnes to do a title search on the property; he found no owner, and in 2002, the cemetery "was declared an abandoned property". Warnes did find a Georgia law "which allows local governments to use local funds to care for abandoned property without the local government assuming ownership or responsibility."

== Restoration efforts ==
In 2007, Athens-Clarke County designated $350,170 for rehabilitation efforts. The restoration project was completed on October 13, 2008. In 2009, the project received an Outstanding Achievement Award from the Athens-Clarke Heritage Foundation and an Excellence in Rehabilitation Award from the Georgia Trust for Historic Preservation.

The University of Georgia's New Media Institute hoped to attract visitors to the site and set up a local phone number that visitors could dial to hear descriptions of the cemetery's history and commentary by Rev. Archibald Killian, a local expert on black history.

== Notable burials ==
- Monroe Bowers "Pink" Morton (1856–1919), who built the Morton Theatre
- Madison Davis (1833–1902), who, along with Alfred Richardson, was one of two black, former slave, state legislators from Clarke County during Reconstruction. It is worth noting that, "[r]umor has it that Richardson is buried" there, "[b]ut no marked grave has been found for him... Fellow legislator Madison Davis is buried in Gospel Pilgrim with a fine headstone."
- Anne Smith Derricotte (1883–1964), a local Athens teacher
- Juliette Derricotte (1897–1931), educator and Dean of Women, Fisk University
- Samuel F. Harris (1875–1935) – educator and principal of the Athens High & Industrial School from its opening in 1916 until his death
- Charles Hicks (1841–1916), US Army veteran from the 138th Regiment United States Colored Troops (Georgia), Company K.
- William A. Pledger (1852–1904), co-founder of the Athens Blade, a local African American newspaper
- Harriet Powers (1837–1910), former enslaved person, folk artist, quilt maker; grave rediscovered in 2005
- Alfred Richardson (1837–1872), who was elected to the Georgia State House from Athens-Clarke County in 1868

== Gallery ==
Entrance to Gospel Pilgrim Cemetery	Monroe Bowers "Pink" Morton Plot, Gospel Pilgrim Cemetery, 2020	Headstone of Edward Bacon (1854–1906) at right, Gospel Pilgrim Cemetery, 2015	Headstones of Minnie Davis (1859–1940) in the center and Mrs. Agnes Young (1832–1898) tall right, 2015
Annie Smith Derricotte (1883 - 1964) Headstone	Ribbon wreath at Harriet Powers grave site. Laid Oct 31 2010.	Harriet and Armstead Powers headstone front side, dedicated 2 December 2023.	Harriet and Armstead Powers headstone back side of memorial.

== See also ==
- National Register of Historic Places listings in Clarke County, Georgia
