= West Broad Street School =

School in Georgia, US

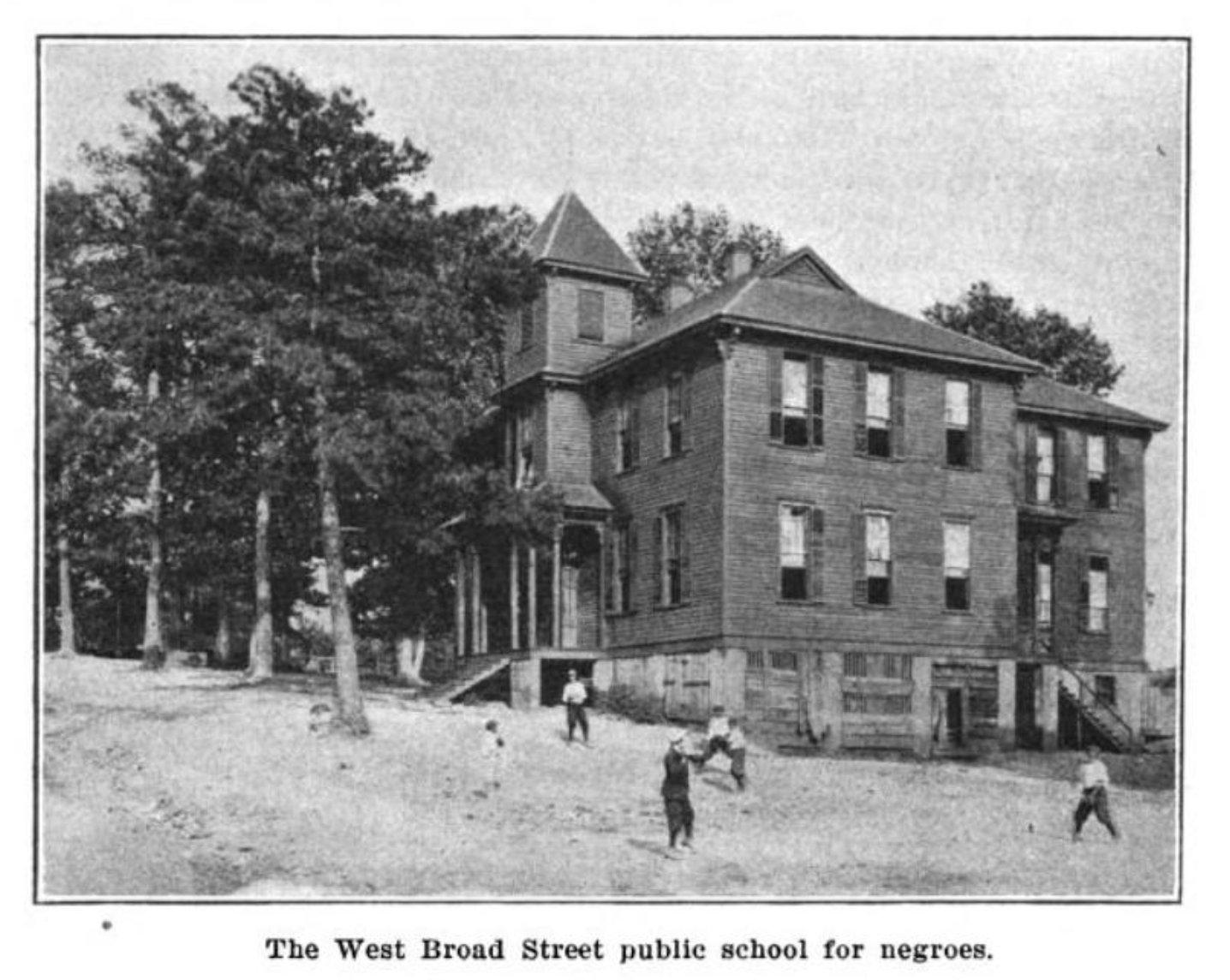
- West Broad Street School (c. 1913)

Location
- West Broad at Minor Street, Athens, Georgia; Clarke County; United States; 33.952587°N 83.397345°W

Information
- Former names: West Broad Street School for Colored, West Broad Public School for Negroes
- School type: Public
- Founded: 1891

West Broad Street School was a public school for African Americans founded in 1891, in Athens, Georgia, United States. Three of its historic school buildings remain. The Clarke County Board of Education has been in ongoing discussion about the future of this former campus since 2016, with mention of proposed demolition in order to build a low income early childhood education program at the site.

== Pre-history ==
The Baxter Street School was the first Athens public school specifically for African American students, opened in 1886. That same year in 1886, Washington Street School (formerly the Market Street School) was opened for white students. In 1893 the Baxter Street School was remodeled and used for white students. The same year in 1893, the West Broad Street School and the East Athens School were opened for African American students.

== History ==
The West Broad Street School land was purchased by the school district in 1891, and the earliest building was completed in 1893, which was presumably demolished later for overcrowding. In 1893, A.J. Carey served as the first principal, he previously was principal at the Baxter Street School. Rev. James Albert Bray served as the principal from 1902 until 1903, while he also worked as a pastor at Trinity CME Church in Augusta, Georgia.

The oldest of the three extant buildings is the Minor Street Building (1938) dating back to a time of Jim Crow laws; the other campus buildings are the West Broad Street Building (1954) and Campbell Lane Building (1958).

== See also ==
- Clarke Central High School, located nearby
- Knox Institute (1868–1928), private Black school in Athens
