= The Colored American =

The Colored American may refer to:

- The Colored American (Augusta, Georgia) an Augusta, Georgia newspaper of 1865-1866
- The Colored American (New York City), a New York City newspaper of 1837–1842
- The Colored American (Washington, D.C.), a Washington, D.C., newspaper of 1893–1904
- The Colored American Magazine, a magazine published in Boston and New York, 1900–1909
