= Knox Institute =

Former school in Athens, Georgia, United States

Coordinates: 33.9567°N 83.3848°W

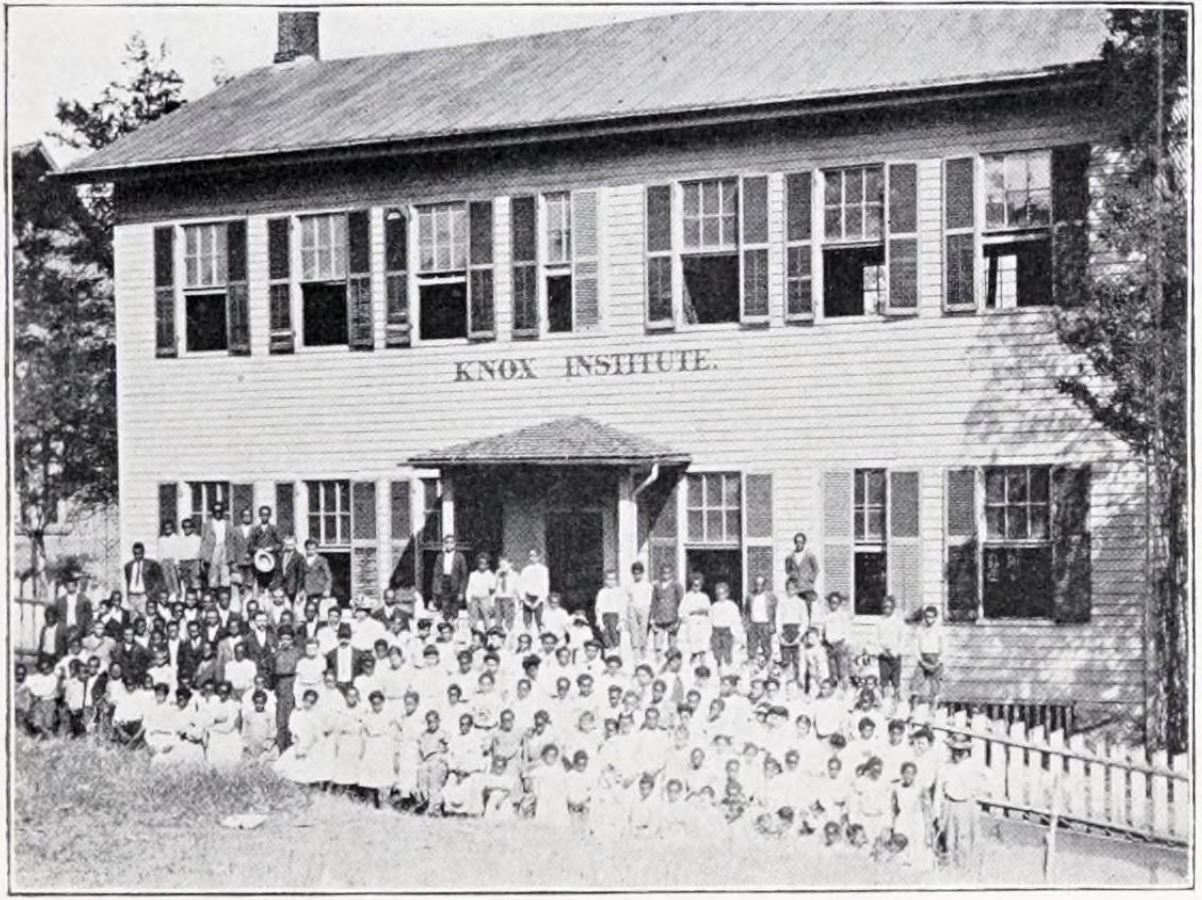
Knox Institute, c. 1910

Knox Institute and Industrial School was a private elementary and secondary school for African American students in Athens, Georgia, United States. It was open from 1868 until 1928. Alumni include Monroe Morton, a builder and real estate businessman whose legacy includes the Morton Building in Athens, and Charles W. Chappelle. The school was named for Major John J. Knox of the Freedmen's Bureau. The federal agency helped fund the school. Athens' first African American Postmaster, Madison Davis, was one of those who helped purchase property for the school.

== History ==
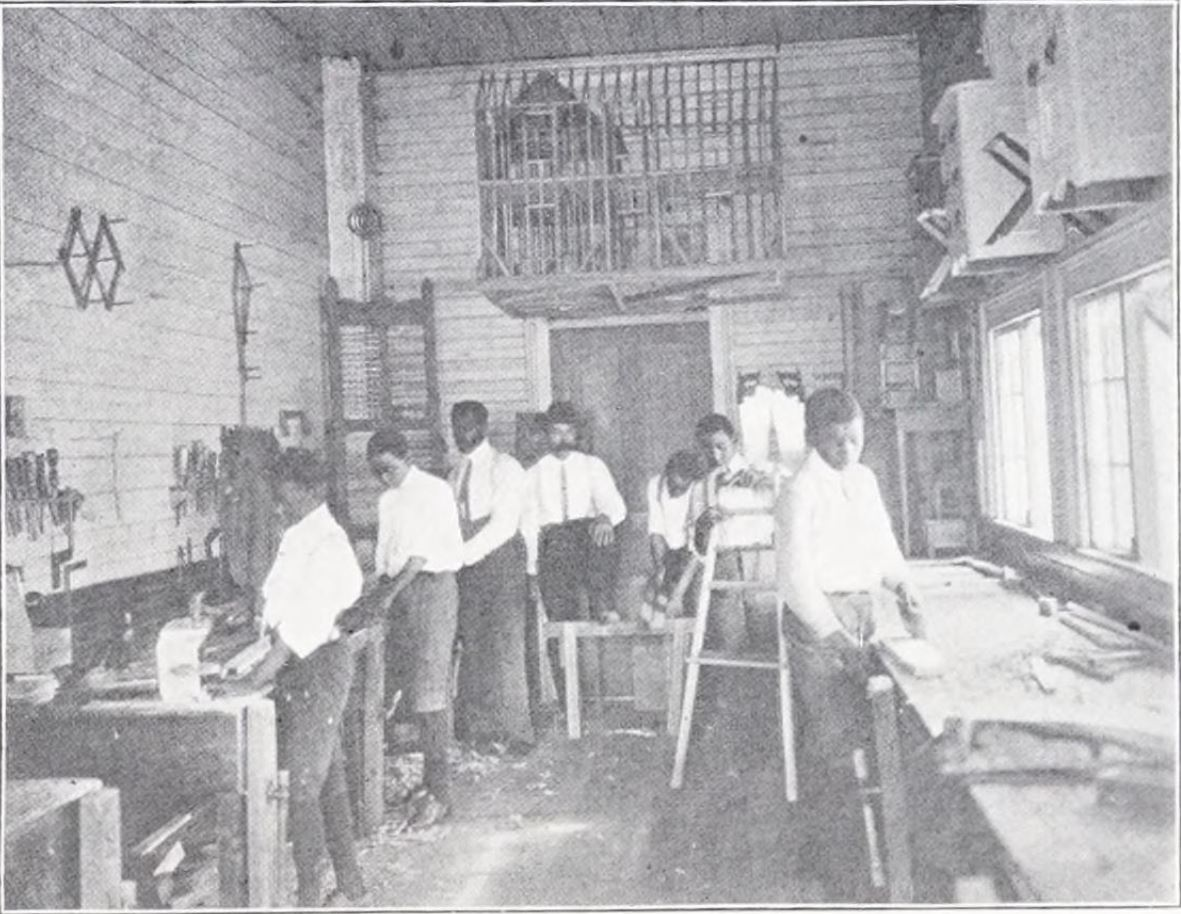
A carpentry class at the school

The Knox Institute and Industrial School was a private school at the corner of Reese Street and Pope Streets in Athens. Originally known as Knox School, it developed as a trade school offering training in carpentry, painting and other skills. It also prepared students to attend Historically Black Colleges. The campus included a building donated by Andrew Carnegie. There was also a boys and girls dormitory for students who did not live nearby.

== Athens High and Industrial School ==
Athens High and Industrial School, originally Reese Street School, took over the Knox campus in 1933. It was the first four-year public high school for African Americans in Georgia. A historic marker was added to the site in 2010.

== Alumni ==
- Monroe Morton
- Hall Johnson
- Charles W. Chappelle

== See also ==
- Baxter Street School, the first public school for African American students in Athens, Georgia
