= Progressive Era (disambiguation) =

The Progressive Era was a period of social activism and political reform in the United States between the 1890s and the 1920s.

Progressive Era may also refer to:

- The Progressive Era, a newspaper published in Athens, Georgia
- Pro Era, an American hip hop collective from New York
