= Springfield Baptist Church (Augusta, Georgia) =

Historic church in Georgia, United States

- U.S. National Register of Historic Places
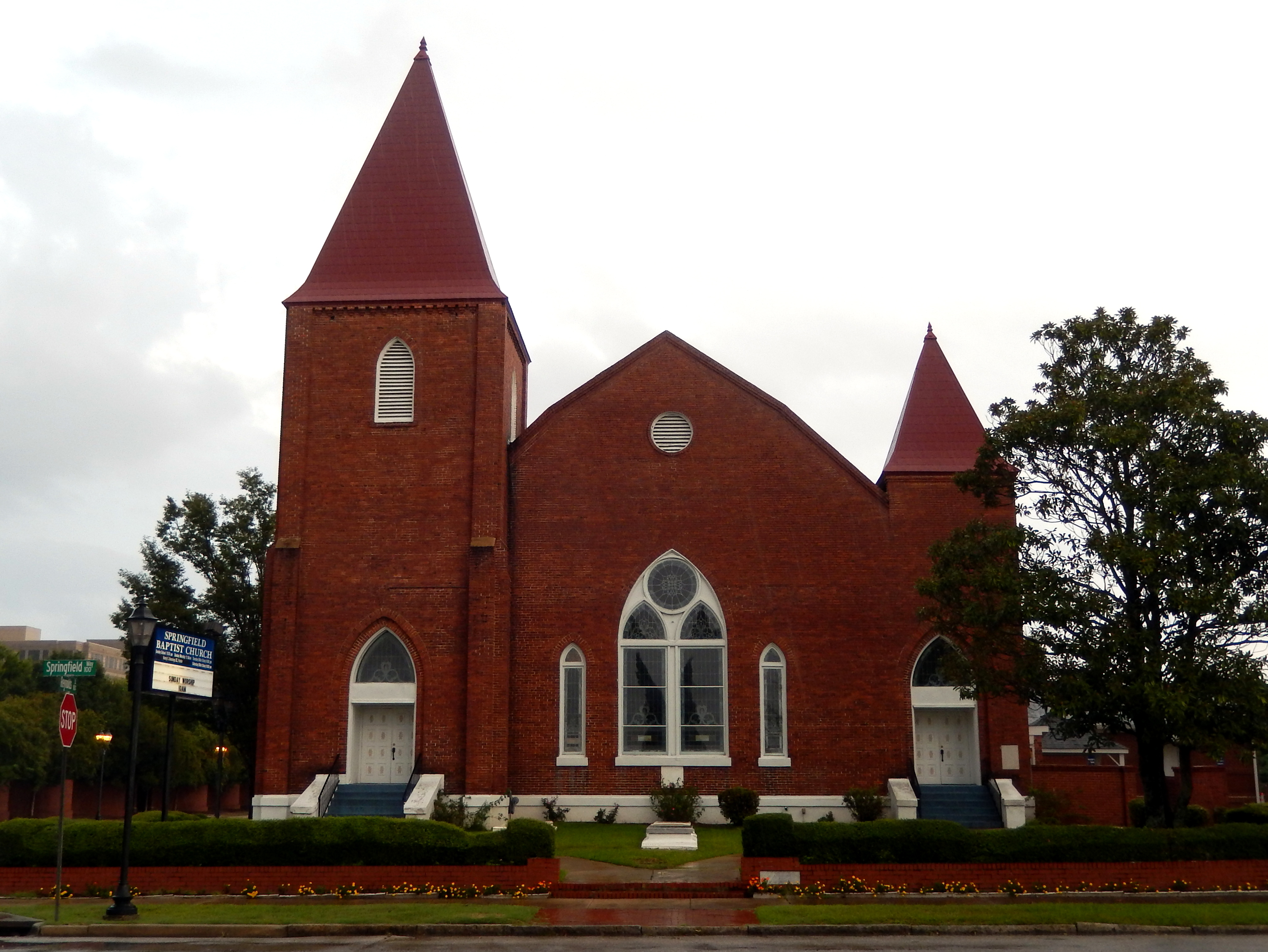

- Location within Georgia Location within the United States
- Location: 112 12th St. (original) and 114 12th St. (increase), Augusta, Georgia
- Coordinates: 33°28′43″N 81°58′18″W
- Built: 1801 (both)
- Architect: Todd, Albert Whitner (increase)
- Architectural style: Gothic (increase)
- NRHP reference No.: 82002461 (original); 90000979 (increase)

Significant dates
- Added to NRHP: June 17, 1982
- Boundary increase: July 5, 1990

Springfield Baptist Church is a Baptist church in Augusta, Georgia was built in 1801 and is a significant historical building for its architecture, religious history, and African American heritage. It is affiliated with the American Baptist Churches USA.

It was built in the architectural style of a New England meetinghouse, which is rare in Georgia. It is the oldest church building extant in Augusta and is claimed to be one of the oldest Black congregations in the U.S. The 1801, Springfield Baptist Church was listed on the National Register of Historic Places listings in Richmond County, Georgia in 1982, and the boundary of the National Register of Historic Places-listed site was increased in 1990.

== History ==
=== Architecture ===
"The simple, two-story rectangular wooden building has two doors at the first floor topped by two arched windows and a smaller arched attic window in the gable of the street facade. The east and west sides of the church boast first and second-floor ranges of seven wooden 12/12 windows. The interior of the church has an assembly-hall plan consisting of a shallow vestibule on the north end and a long narrow meeting hall."

In 1844, the Methodists built a new brick church at 736 Greene Street. This old meeting house was rolled on logs to the corner of 12th St and Reynolds to be given to the Springfield Baptist congregation, one of the oldest black Baptist congregations in the nation. During the antebellum years, it had 1,000 members and was the largest congregation of any in the Georgia Baptist Association. Springfield Baptist hosted the 1866 Georgia State Freedmen's Conventions.

In 1897, the congregation built a new church on the site, in the Late Victorian Gothic style. The former building was moved to face Reynolds Street, and they continue to maintain it and use it for special events.

=== Baptist congregation ===
The Baptist church congregation predates the building and was founded in 1787, by Reverend Jesse Peters. The congregation claims continuous ties with Silver Bluff Baptist Church, founded 1774–1775 in South Carolina as one of the first black Baptist congregations in the nation. For this reason, the historian Walter Brooks suggested it was the oldest black Baptist congregation. The First Baptist Church in Petersburg, Virginia was organized in 1774 and also contends for this distinction.

== See also ==
- List of the oldest buildings in Georgia
