= Monroe Morton =

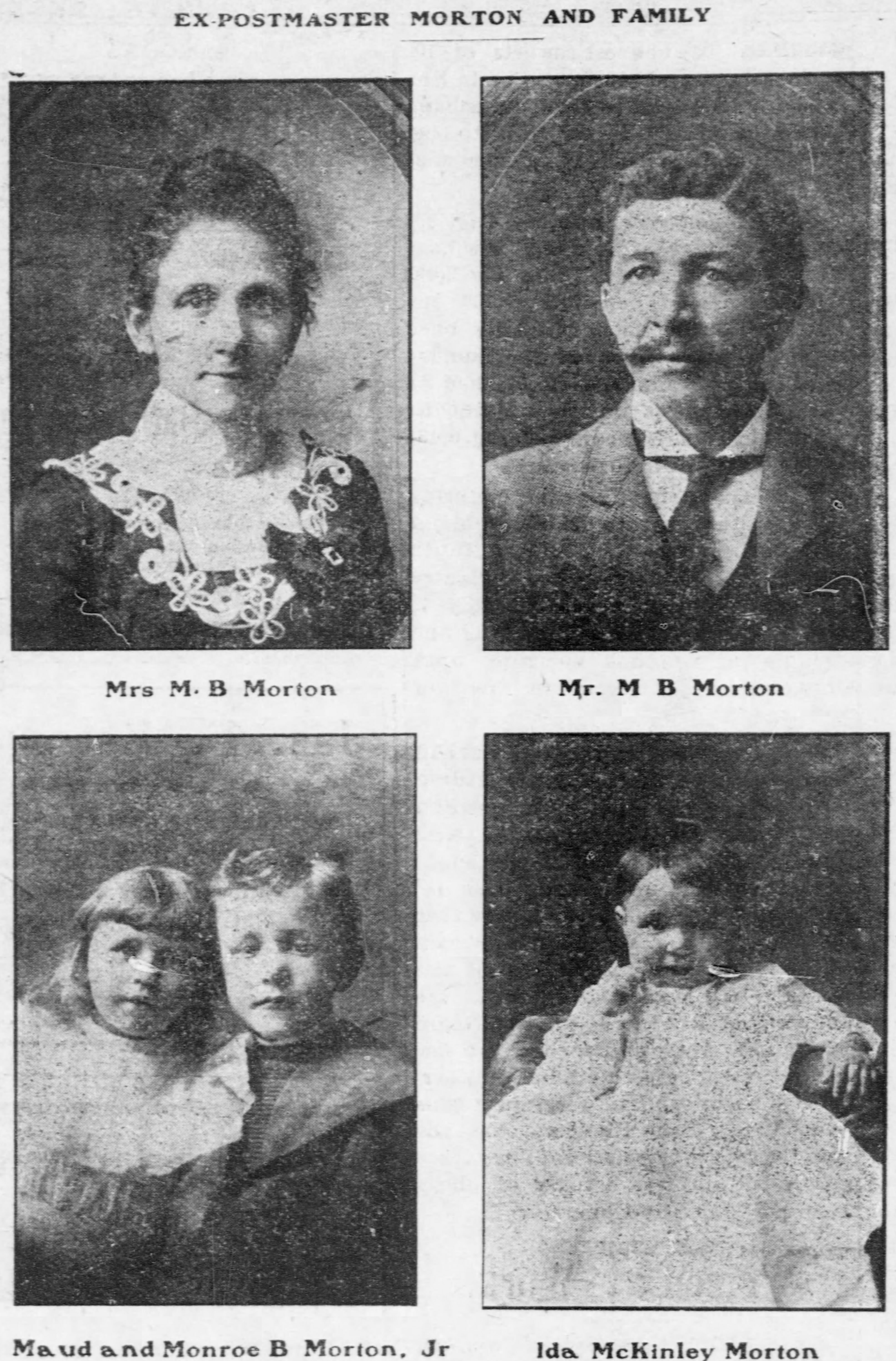
Pink Morton and his family in 1902

Monroe Bowers Morton, nicknamed Pink Morton (July 31, 1856 – February 12, 1919) was a prominent building owner, publisher, building contractor, developer, and postmaster in late 19th-century Georgia. An African American, he lived most of his life in Athens, Georgia, where he published a newspaper and built the Morton Building. The building included the Morton Theatre on its upper floors, a vaudeville venue, and offices for African-American professionals including doctors and druggists (pharmacists) on its ground floor. Occupants included Dr. Ida Mae Johnson Hiram, the first Black woman to be licensed to practice medicine (dentistry) in the state, and Dr. William H. Harris, one of the founders of the Georgia State Medical Association of Colored Physicians, Dentists and Druggists.

== Early life ==
Morton's mother, a former slave, was half white and half black. His father was white. He was called Pink because of his light skin-tone. Morton attended a secret school led by Reverend James Sims in Savannah, Georgia before the American Civil War (1861–1865) brought emancipation to Georgia. He later attended the Knox Institute and then became a messenger for Major John J. Knox of the Freedmen's Bureau.

== Business career ==
After working for Knox, Morton worked as a survey engineer on the "North Eastern Railroad" together with Bill Pledger, who also went into politics later in his life. Morton eventually moved to Athens, Georgia, where he became a central figure in the black political and business community.

Morton owned between 20 and 35 buildings in Athens and was selected as a contractor for the Wilkes County Courthouse. He also worked on a Federal Building in Anniston, Alabama. He published The Progressive Era newspaper.

=== Morton building ===
Morton purchased a building lot in 1909 and completed construction of the Morton Building in 1910. The building held offices of African American professionals and housed the Morton Theatre, a vaudeville venue and then a movie theater that is now restored and used as an arts center.

His theater, sometimes referred to as Morton's Opera House, hosted many prominent African American performers including from New York City's Cotton Club. Performers at the theater included Duke Ellington, Bessie Smith, Ma Rainey, Louis Armstrong and Cab Calloway. Morton owned a large two-story home on Prince Avenue at South Milledge Avenue in Athens.

== Political and civil service career ==
Morton became politically active and was one of Athens's alternate delegates to the 1884 Republican National Convention. Next he was appointed postal agent on the Gainesville, Jefferson, and Southern railroad. Later in 1884, he traded routes with another carrier due to fears that he might be lynched on the former route.

During his political career, Morton was affiliated with Alfred Eliab Buck, although he briefly fell out of the powerful politician's favor when Morton sought to oust Madison "Matt" Davis from the position of postal agent in Athens and to gain the position for himself.

In 1892, he was considered as a candidate for congress to represent the eighth district, but did not run. In 1896, 1900, and 1904, he was again a delegate to the Republican National Convention. Morton was part of the Republican delegation that informed William McKinley that he was the Republican Party's nominee for president in 1896.

He was appointed postmaster in Athens and was the second African American after Davis to hold the position. Davis was also a former slave and politician and served as postmaster from 1882 until 1886. Both faced opposition from some whites in Georgia who opposed their holding office. Other African American officials in Georgia also faced hostility including Judson Whitlocke Lyons, Matt Davis, and John Thomas Heard. In 1897, postmaster General James Albert Gary decided not to allow an African American to be postmaster in large cities in the south. In July 1897, W. W. Foraker, a white man and relative of Ohio politician, Joseph B. Foraker, was announced as a selection for Athens, but ultimately Morton was installed in Athens and Lyons in Augusta by President William McKinley. These selections, along with that of Henry A. Rucker as Internal Revenue Collector for the State of Georgia, were widely opposed. Opposition continued and in 1898 Morton was accused by a mail carrier of various crimes. The criticism and opposition intensified when Morton was up for renomination in late 1901 and 1902, and he was not reappointed by President Theodore Roosevelt.

== Death and legacy ==
Morton died in 1919 and is buried in the Morton family lot at Gospel Pilgrim Cemetery in Athens.

In 2013, documentary filmmaker Keith Plummer began work on a film about the theater and the man behind it. The theater block is referred to colloquially as "Hot Corner", and was a center of Black business and culture in Athens in the early 20th century. The 30 minute film premiered in 2015 at the theater and includes an interview with Morton's grandson.
