= 1866 Georgia State Freedmen's Conventions =

The Georgia State Freedmen's Convention meetings, where both whites and blacks would come together to solve local problems and discuss politics, took place in 1866. The Freedmen's Convention took place in Augusta, Georgia. This was after the Civil War, emancipation, and just one year after the assassination of President Abraham Lincoln. President Lincoln is mentioned many times in these meetings as being a savior of the African American people in the United States. Early prominent leaders of this organization include Captain John Emory Bryant, who was named the first president, Captain C. H. Prince and Thomas P. Beard.

== January 10th, 1866 Meeting ==

The first convention meeting on January 10, 1866, details the rules, routines, and leaders of the Freedmen's Convention. It was held in the Springfield Colored Baptist Church in Augusta, Georgia. One of the first actions of the convention was to change the name of the organization to the Georgia Equal Rights Association, which was known in the coming years. During this meeting, Captain J.E. Bryant, a white Republican, was named the convention's first president after a vote. After this, the rules and routines of the convention were established in the form of The Constitution of the Georgia Equal Rights Association. Some of these rules include the times the convention would meet, a required prayer before the proceedings of the convention, and the roles of the leaders of the organization, When it came to decorum during the meetings, the rules of the convention were very similar to Robert's Rules of order. Another aspect of the meeting was thanking President Lincoln for his sacrifice before and during the Civil War to help black people in the United States.

== April 4, 1866 Meeting ==
The second convention took place on April 4, 1866, in the Office of the Loyal Georgian, a newspaper produced by the Georgia Equal Rights Association from 1866 to 1867. At this meeting, President J.E. Bryant urged his members to elect a black man to be sent to the U.S. Congress as a representative of blacks in the United States. He also told the members to be law-abiding citizens, especially when it came to taxes. According to Bryant, the thousands of black, tax-paying, law abiding Americans deserved representation. When it came to representation, no one could have done it better than one of their own, a black person. Bryant also brings to light the Loyal Georgian newspaper, which played a vital role in the Georgia Equal Rights Association. During this meeting, the Georgia Equal Rights Association voted to allocate funds from the membership fees for the production and publication of the Loyal Georgian. The men who were in charge of the finances were also chosen during this time, Captain C.H. Prince and Thomas P. Beard, a white man and a black man respectively. There was also a similar structure for the editors of the paper, one black man and one white man. This was done because in order for their organization to succeed, it was necessary for them to work with white allies who had more access and rights than they did. Bryant was also a huge advocate for education in the black community, especially when it came to equalizing public schools for black children.

== Outcome of Meetings ==
After the April 1866 meeting, the Loyal Georgian went on to run for another year until falling out of print. J.E. Bryant remained the editor of the Loyal Georgian until the end. However, there is no mention of J.E. Bryant after the meetings in 1866 and no information about him except his relation to the Loyal Georgian and the early meetings of the Georgia Equal Rights Association. The other important men like C. H. Prince and Thomas P. Beard also seem to disappear in history after the meetings. In the years 1869–1888, the Georgia state conventions were moved to Macon, Georgia.

== See also ==
- Colored Conventions Movement
- Abraham Lincoln
- Robert's Rules of Order

== Sources ==
- Proceedings of the Freedmen's Convention of Georgia : assembled at Augusta, January 10th, 1866, containing the speeches of Gen'l Tillson, Capt. J.E. Bryant, and others (1866). Augusta, GA: Colored Conventions Project Digital Records, Accessed 2020.
- Forman, Sarah Jane. "Ghetto Education.(education Provided for the Poor)." Washington University Journal of Law & Policy 40 (2012): 67.
- "An Appeal From Georgia." The Independent ... Devoted to the Consideration of Politics, Social and Economic Tendencies, History, Literature, and the Arts (1848-1921) 60, no. 2987 (1906): 523.
- Bardolph, Richard. The Civil Rights Record: Black Americans and the Law, 1849-1970.Crowell Publications in History. New York: Crowell, 1970.
