= Athens Republique =

African American newspaper from Athens, Georgia, USA

The Athens Republique
- Devoted to the Religious, the Educational and the Industrial Development of the Colored Race.
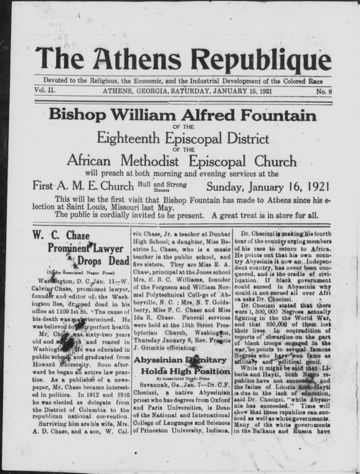
- Cover of The Athens Republique newspaper, from January 15, 1921
- Type: Weekly newspaper
- Owner: Julian Lucasse Brown
- Publisher: Jeruel Baptist Association
- Founded: 1919
- Ceased publication: 1927
- Headquarters: Athens, Georgia
- City: Athens, Georgia
- Country: United States
- ISSN: 2768-654X
- OCLC number: 812195741

The Athens Republique was an African American newspaper in Athens, Georgia. It was published from 1919 to 1927. The paper's editor, Julian Lucasse Brown, was a World War I lieutenant who founded the paper upon his return from serving in France. The paper reported on racial progress and setbacks, and denounced lynchings and the rise of the Ku Klux Klan. The newspaper's motto was "Devoted to the Religious, the Educational and the Industrial Development of the Colored Race" and it was closely associated with the Jeruel Baptist Association. After the demise of The Athens Republique, there was no African American newspaper in Athens until the founding of the Athens Voice in 1975.
