= List of African American newspapers in South Carolina =

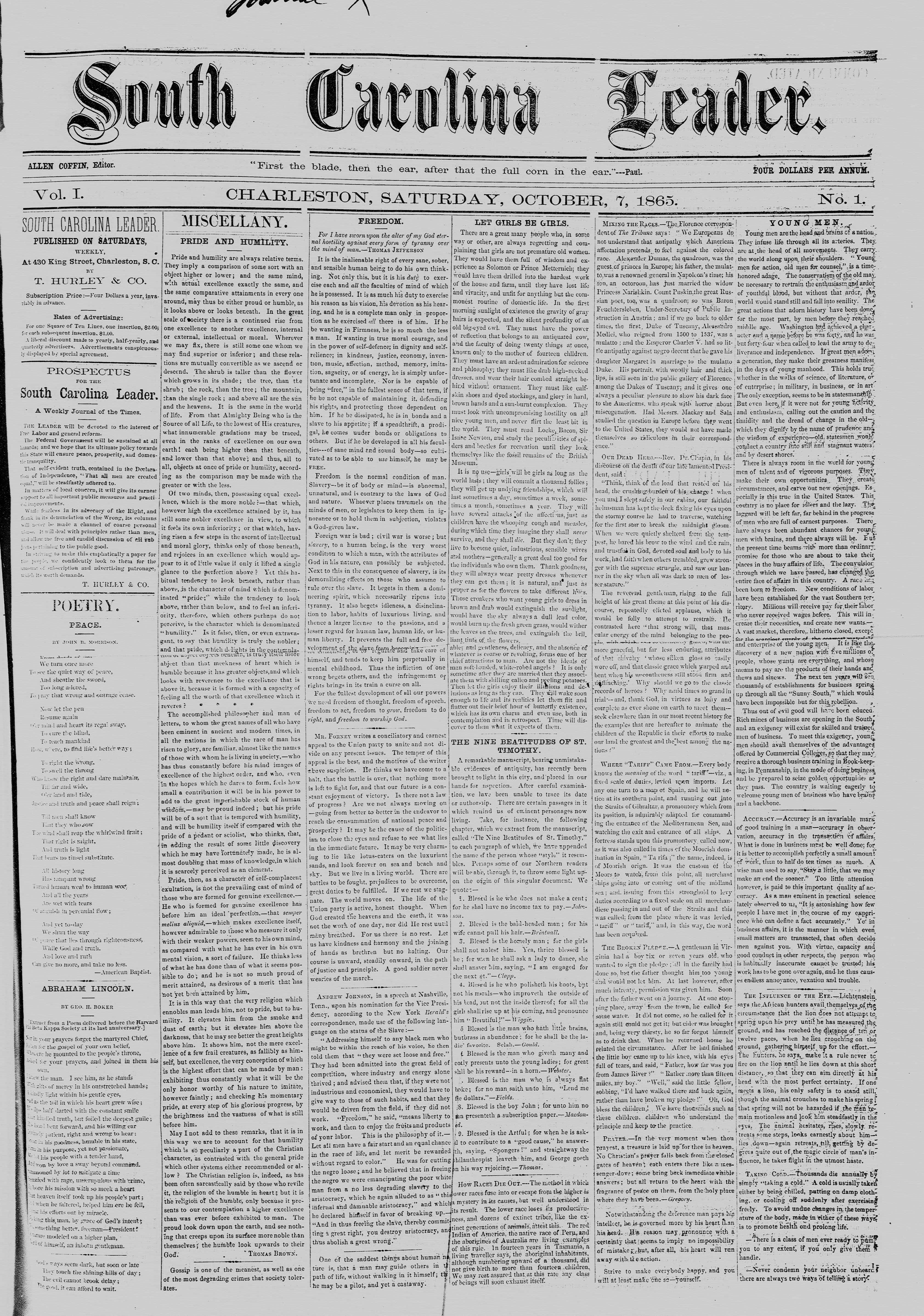
Inaugural issue of the South Carolina Leader from October 1865.

This is a list of African American newspapers that have been published in South Carolina. It includes both current and historical newspapers. More than 130 such newspapers were published in the state between 1865 and 1970. The first was the South Carolina Leader, established at Charleston in 1865. In the 19th and early 20th centuries, the growth of the African American press in South Carolina was hampered by the fact that a large proportion of South Carolina African Americans lived in poverty in the countryside.

== Newspapers ==
City	Title	Beginning	End	Frequency	Call numbers	Remarks
	1800s				Founded by S.H. Jefferson.; Only African American newspaper published in upper South Carolina during the 1880s.	
Anderson	The Herald	1957	1970s	Weekly	LCCN sn93067907; OCLC 28616245	
Beaufort	The New South	1879 or 1880s	1890s	Weekly	LCCN sn93067638; OCLC 27776092	Attested through at least 1898.
Beaufort	The Sea Island News	1879	1888	Weekly	LCCN sn84026859; OCLC 10715901	
Beaufort	Standard; Beaufort Southern Standard	1870s	1870s			Edited by Robert Smalls.; Designated as the official newspaper of the Beaufort County government.
Beaufort / Blackville	Beaufort County Times; Barnwell County Times	1871	1870s	Weekly	LCCN sn84026858; OCLC 10715814	Edited by D. Thomas.; Published by William S. Whipple, who moved the paper to Barnwell County after becoming the county treasurer there.; Attested through at least 1874.
Bennettsville	The Carolina Messenger	1974	1978	Weekly	LCCN sn93067691; OCLC 27902606	
Bennettsville	Community Observer	1978	1981	Weekly	LCCN sn92065658; OCLC 26739179	
Bennettsville	Pee Dee Educator	1879 or 1890	1900 or 1906	Twice monthly	LCCN sn92065549; OCLC 25837696	
Charleston	The Charleston Advocate	1867	1868	Weekly	LCCN 2011254277, sn83025784; OCLC 2610929, 733407181, 9803264; ISSN 2166-1707	Published by H.J. Moore.; Free online archive
Charleston	The Afro-American Citizen	1899	1900 or 1902	Weekly	LCCN 2011254023, sn83025782; OCLC 2611061, 707536677, 9797992; ISSN 2166-1669	Free online archive
Charleston	The Charleston Chronicle; The Chronicle (1993–)	1971	2021	Weekly	LCCN sn93067867; OCLC 18769155; The Chronicle: LCCN sn93067968, sn83008435; OCLC 9797007, 28446174; ISSN 0746-1429	Official site; Published and edited by J. John French.
Charleston	The Coastal Times	1983	?	Weekly	LCCN sn93067801; OCLC 28283855	
Charleston	Charleston Free Press	1871	1871	Daily	LCCN sn92065444; OCLC 25291084	
Charleston	The Free Press	1868	1868	Weekly	LCCN 2011254378, sn83025795; OCLC 2611110, 753794094, 9803310; ISSN 2166-1715	Free online archive; Published by T. Hurley.
Charleston	The Charleston Herald	1952	1955	Weekly	LCCN sn93067920; OCLC 28731186	
Charleston	The Charleston Inquirer	1963	1964	Weekly	LCCN sn93067608; OCLC 27302316	
Charleston	The Charleston Journal	1866	1860s	Weekly	LCCN sn93059242; OCLC 27776023	
Charleston / Columbia	Lighthouse and Informer; The Lighthouse and Informer	1941	1954	Weekly	LCCN sn92065442, 2013254302; OCLC 664617378, 25291022	Published in Columbia from 1944 to 1954.; A key voice of protest during the early years of the civil rights movement.
Charleston	The Charleston Lighthouse	1939	1941	Weekly	LCCN sn92065445; OCLC 25291097	
Charleston	The Charleston Messenger	1894	1946	Bimonthly newspaper	LCCN sn95077201; OCLC 33273095	Published by Daniel Jenkins and affiliated with an orphanage he operated.
Charleston	Missionary Record	1868	1879	Weekly	LCCN 2013254323, sn83025781, sn84026949; OCLC 778032530, 9797551; ISSN 2165-9419	Free online archive; Successor to the South Carolina Leader.; Edited by Richard Harvey Cain.
Charleston	The New Citizen	1948	1952	Weekly	LCCN sn93067932; OCLC 28731168	
Charleston	The Palmetto Press	1882	1885	Weekly	LCCN sn84026992; OCLC 10797193	Edited by R.L. Smith.
Charleston	South Carolina Leader	1865	1868 or 1867	Weekly	LCCN 2012203298, sn83025783; OCLC 2789571, 794292043, 9798897; ISSN 2166-1693, 2169-4621	Free online archive; Published by T. Hurley and Co.
Charleston	Southern Reporter	1900	1920			
Columbia	Black News; Black Star; Black Sun; Black Times; Black Views; Black Voice	1970 or 1977	current	Weekly	LCCN sn89080108; OCLC 25161210	Official site; Published by Isaac Washington.; Numerous local editions published with different titles.
Columbia	Black On News	1972	1977	Weekly	LCCN sn93067922; OCLC 28731216	
Columbia	Black On To The Bone	1973	1973	Monthly newspaper	LCCN sn93067909; OCLC 28731176	
Columbia	Carolina Afro-weekly	1969	1974	Weekly	LCCN sn93067915; OCLC 28640953	
Columbia	Carolina Panorama; Piedmont Post (1993)	1978	current	Weekly	LCCN sn93067955; OCLC 28948871	Official site
Columbia	The Carolina Tribune	1900s	?	Weekly	LCCN 2012271290; OCLC 85851097	Also published in numerous local editions.; Attested through at least 1995.
Columbia	The Christian Soldier	1898	1900	Monthly newspaper	LCCN sn92065652; OCLC 26739419	
Columbia	Columbia's Black News	1984	?	Weekly	LCCN sn99063227; OCLC 41939794	Attested through at least 2012.
Columbia	The Columbia Dispatch	1950s	?	Weekly	LCCN 2018226266; OCLC 1076585839	Attested from 1957.
Columbia	South Carolina Independent	1955	1955	Weekly	LCCN 2013228778; OCLC 43698408	
Columbia	The Light	1916	1928	Weekly	LCCN sn92065618; OCLC 26538720	
Columbia	The Lighthouse	1963	1964	Weekly	LCCN 2013228774; OCLC 43721543	
Columbia	The South Carolina Observer	1960	1960		LCCN sn93067859; OCLC 28616337	
Columbia	Palmetto Gleaner	1890	1892			First African American newspaper in Columbia.
Columbia	The Palmetto Leader	1925	1960s	Weekly	LCCN sn93067919; OCLC 28640893	Free online archive; Published by George H. Hampton.; A key voice of protest during the early years of the civil rights movement.
Columbia	The Palmetto Post	1970	1971	Weekly	LCCN sn93067917; OCLC 28640945	
Columbia	The Palmetto Post	1984	?	Weekly	LCCN sn93067929; OCLC 28640898	
Columbia	Palmetto Times	1962	1964	Weekly	LCCN sn93067858; OCLC 28483730	
Columbia / Orangeburg (1903–1921)	The People's Recorder	1893	1925 or 1905	Weekly	LCCN 2014254019, sn83025797; OCLC 2754377, 9804805, 778033158; ISSN 2166-1731	Free online archive; Published by Nix and Holmes.
Columbia	The Recorder-Indicator	1925	1931	Weekly	LCCN sn92065692; OCLC 27040906	
Columbia	SouthCarolinian	1987	?	Monthly newspaper	LCCN sn93067864; OCLC 28483703	
Columbia	The Southern Indicator	1913 or 1903	1924 or 1925	Weekly	LCCN sn83025803, 2014254328; OCLC 778033315, 2789588, 9810255; ISSN 2166-1758	Free online archive; Edited by J.A. Roach.
Columbia	The Southern Sun	1902	1909	Weekly	LCCN sn92065630; OCLC 26572496	
Columbia	The Standard	1919	1927	Weekly	LCCN sn92065548; OCLC 25837686	
Columbia	Venture	1978	1979	Monthly newspaper	LCCN sn92065620; OCLC 26538714	
Florence	The Community Times; The Times	1997 or 1992	?	Weekly	LCCN 2012271271, sn93067883; OCLC 27439267, 37920426	Official feed
Florence	Pee Dee Times	1987	1992	Weekly	LCCN sn93067848; OCLC 27105869	
Georgetown	Georgetown Advocate	1902	1905	Weekly	LCCN sn92065712; OCLC 27055771	
Georgetown	The Georgetown Planet	1873	1875	Weekly	LCCN 2011254385, sn83025798; OCLC 764798151, 9804903; ISSN 2166-174X	Free online archive; Edited by local politicians James A. Bawley and R.O. Rush.
Greenville	The Carolina News And Guide	1963	1964	Weekly	LCCN sn93067729; OCLC 28036968	
Greenville	Focus	1973	1980?	Weekly	LCCN sn93067887; OCLC 28589694	
Greenville	Focus News	1976	1981	Weekly	LCCN sn93067911; OCLC 28570967	
Greenville	Lancet	1890	1890			First African American newspaper in Greenville.
Greenville	The Palmetto Leader	1945	?	Weekly	LCCN sn93067895; OCLC 28616203	Published by Norman P. Pearson, Jr.
Greenville	Southern Crusader	1942	1940s	Weekly	LCCN sn93067759; OCLC 28103733	
Greenville	The Southern Enterprise	1914	1900s	Weekly	LCCN 2009257327, sn93067720; OCLC 28036951, 469142241	Attested through at least 1926.
Greenville	The Times Upstate	1995	?	Weekly	LCCN 2013228823; OCLC 35615475	Attested through at least 2009.
Kingstree	The Williamsburg Republican; Williamsburg Republican	1873	1870s	Weekly	LCCN sn86053220; OCLC 13356699	
Myrtle Beach	The Weekly Journal	1975	1976	Weekly	LCCN sn92065681; OCLC 26995054	
Myrtle Beach	The Weekly Observer	1974	1977	Weekly	LCCN sn92065685; OCLC 26987761	
Orangeburg	The Free Citizen	1874	1876	Weekly	LCCN sn92065529; OCLC 25757236; ISSN 2165-7742	Free online archive; Edited by E.A. Webster in 1874.
Orangeburg	Herald	1960s	1970s			Edited by Davis Lee.; Known for opposing the civil rights movement.
Orangeburg	View South News	1979	?	Weekly	LCCN sn93067786; OCLC 28235103	Attested through at least 1983.
Rock Hill	The Rock Hill Messenger	1896	1919 or 1921	Weekly	LCCN sn83025796, sn830ROCKERS49625796; OCLC 2809525, 9804719; ISSN 2166-1723	Free online archive; Edited by C.P.T. White.
Society Hill	The Society Hill News	1910	1911	Weekly	LCCN sn93067813; OCLC 28283824	
Spartanburg	Advance	1894	1897			
Spartanburg	Negro Index	1916	1922			
Sumter	The Defender	1903	1913	Weekly	LCCN sn92065551; OCLC 25979606	
Sumter	The Peoples Informer	1936	1941	Weekly	LCCN sn92065449; OCLC 25313033	
Sumter	The Samaritan Herald; The Samaritan Herald And The Voice Of Job (1942–1950)	1909	1950	Weekly	LCCN sn92065557, sn92065566; OCLC 25968670, 25968623	
Sumter	Vindicator	1882	1880s			Published by Samuel J. Lee.
Timmonsville	The Watchman And Defender	1920	1931	Weekly	LCCN sn93067826; OCLC 28385719	
Union	The Union Standard	1906	1900s	Twice monthly	LCCN sn93067625; OCLC 27358858	
Williamsburg County	Republican	1873	1870s			Edited by Stephen Atkins Swails.; No copies survive.

== See also ==
- List of African American newspapers and media outlets
- List of African American newspapers in Georgia
- List of African American newspapers in North Carolina
- List of newspapers in South Carolina

== Works cited ==
- Danky, James Philip; Hady, Maureen E., eds. (1998). African-American newspapers and periodicals : a national bibliography. Harvard University Press. ISBN 9780674007888.
- Hemmingway, Theodore (1983). "South Carolina". In Suggs, Henry Lewis (ed.). The Black Press in the South, 1865–1979. ISBN 9780313222443.
- Pride, Armistead Scott; Wilson, Clint C. (1997). A History of the Black Press. Howard University Press. ISBN 9780882581927.
- Tindall, George Brown (2003). South Carolina Negroes, 1877-1900. University of South Carolina Press. ISBN 9781570034947.
