= John T. Shuften =

American journalist (1840–?)

John Thomas Shuften
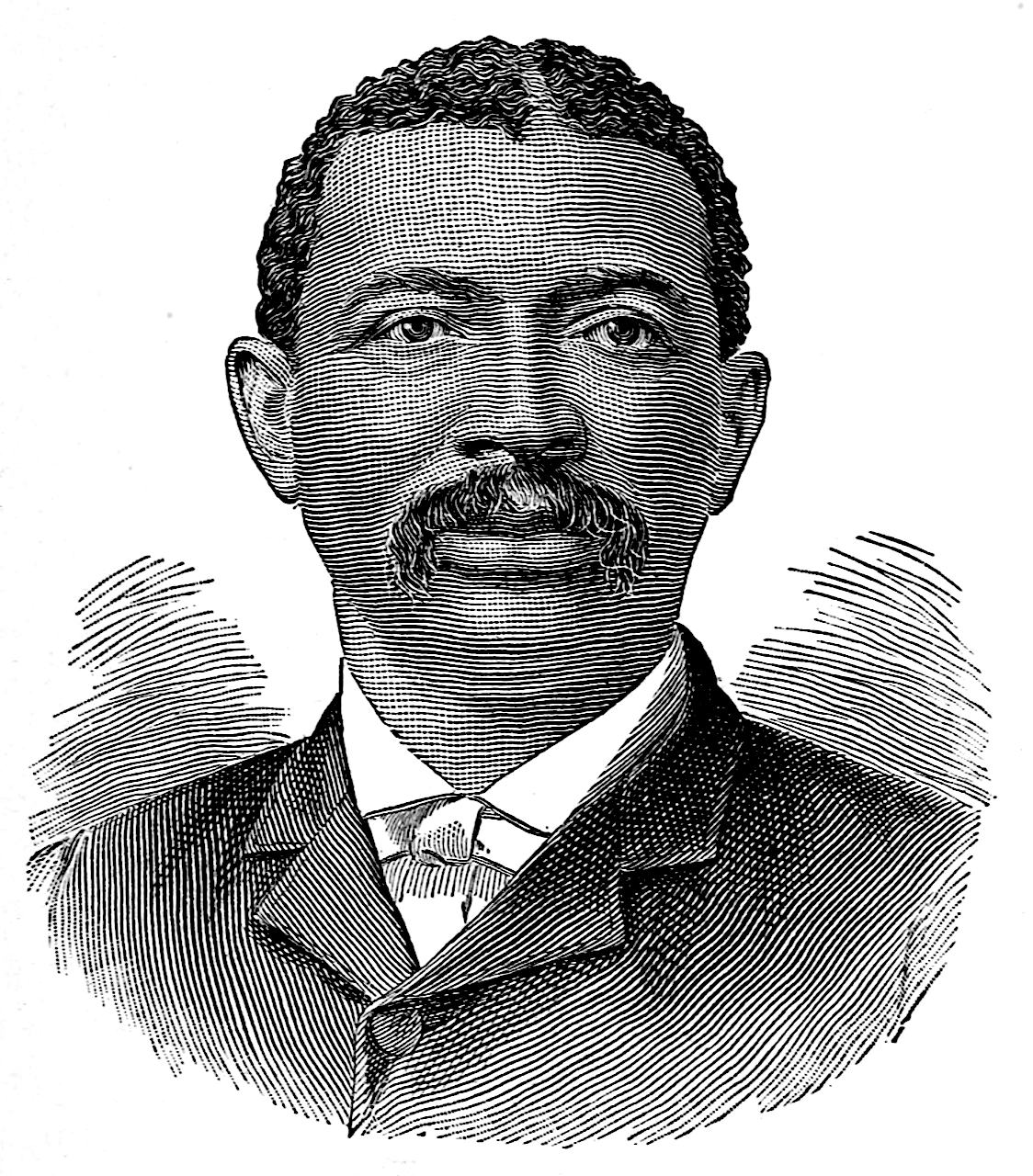
- Born: c. 1840; Augusta, Georgia, U.S.
- Died: unknown
- Other names: John Thomas Shuften Sr., John T. Shuften, J. T. Shuften, J.T. Shuften
- Education: Howard University
- Occupations: Newspaper editor, journalist, lawyer
- Notable work: "A Colored Man's Exposition of the Acts and Doings of the Radical Party South from 1865 to 1876" (1877)

John Thomas Shuften (c. 1840–?), commonly known as J. T. Shuften, was an African-American newspaper editor, journalist, and lawyer. He founded the Colored American newspaper in Macon, Georgia, active from 1865 to 1866. Shuften was an African American who wrote an exposé about the Reconstruction era in the American South, and what he termed as "the great betrayal of the Republican party". He practiced law in Orlando, Florida.

== Biography ==
John Thomas Shuften was born in about 1840 in Augusta, Georgia.

With help from James D. Lynch, he edited the newspaper Colored American in Augusta, Georgia, in October 1865, the first newspaper in the American South published by an African American. About a year later it was acquired by the Georgia Equal Rights Association and became the Loyal Georgian. John Emory Bryant became editor.

In 1876, Shuften received a law degree from Howard University.

In 1877, Shuften wrote an exposé on the political changes after emancipation in the American South, and "the great betrayal of the Republican party"; the article was titled, "A Colored Man's Exposition of the Acts and Doings of the Radical Party South from 1865 to 1876". In 1892 the New York Times touted his switch to the Democratic Party as a result of "Republican trickery" and ran his statement explaining his switch.
