= Henry Lincoln Johnson =

African-American lawyer (1870–1925)

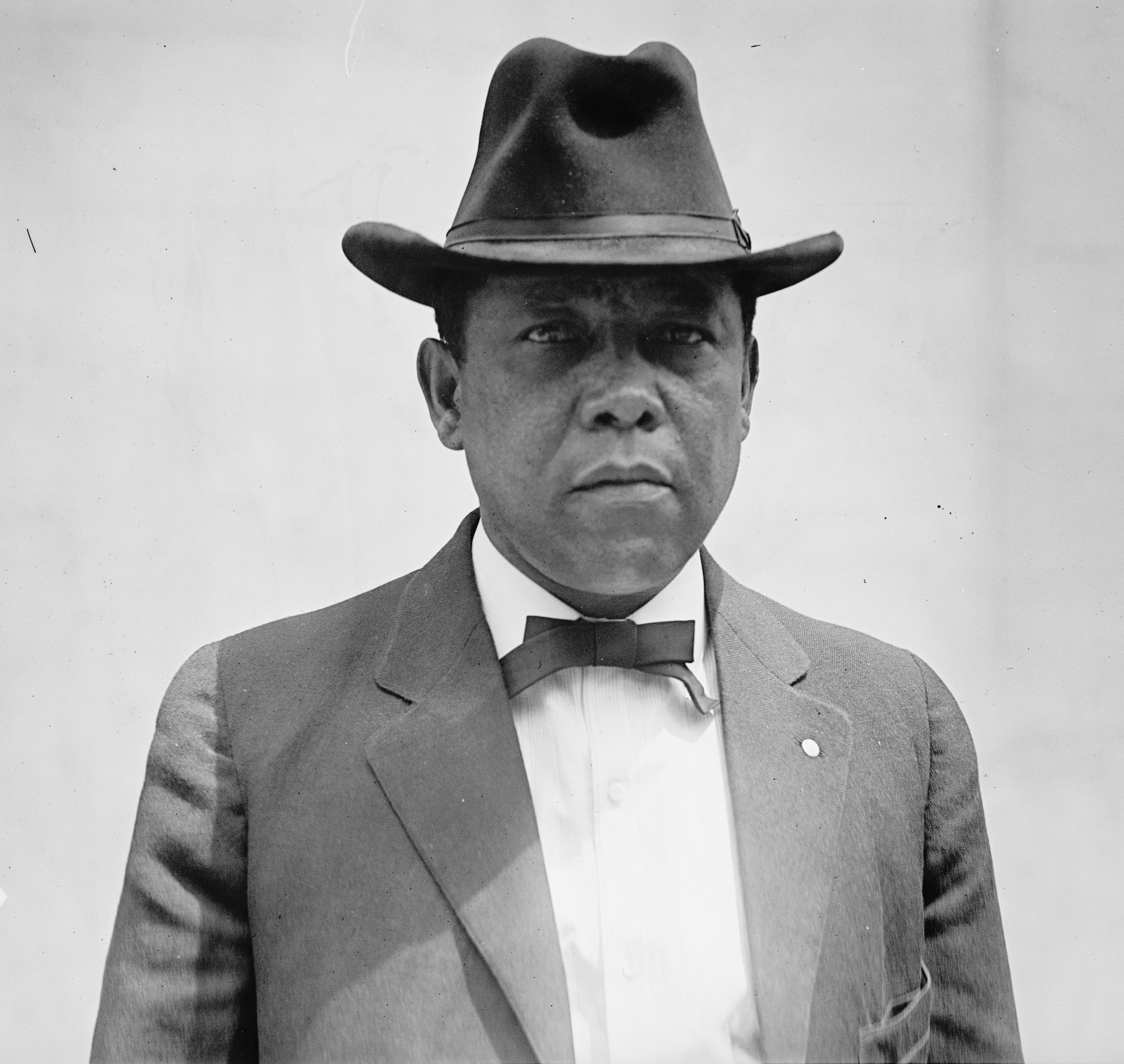
- Johnson in 1914 in Washington

Recorder of Deeds for the District of Columbia
- In office 1909–1913
- Appointed by: William Howard Taft

Personal details
- Born: July 27, 1870 Augusta, Georgia, U.S.
- Died: September 10, 1925 (aged 55) Freedmen's Hospital; Washington, D.C., U.S.
- Party: Republican
- Spouse: Georgia Douglas (m. 1903–1925)
- Children: Henry Lincoln Johnson, Jr. Peter Douglas Johnson
- Parent(s): Martha Ann; Peter Johnson

Henry Lincoln Johnson (July 27, 1870 – September 10, 1925) was an African-American attorney and politician from the state of Georgia. He is best remembered as one of the most prominent African-American Republicans of the first two decades of the 20th century and as a leader of the dominant black-and-tan faction of the Republican Party of Georgia. He was appointed by President William Howard Taft as Recorder of Deeds for the District of Columbia, at the time regarded as the premier political patronage position reserved for black Americans, and one of four appointees known as Taft's "Black Cabinet".

Following the Democratic administration of Woodrow Wilson, Johnson was again appointed Recorder of the Deeds for the District in June 1921 by Republican President Warren G. Harding, but his appointment was rejected by the United States Senate, meeting in executive session and based largely on the opposition of the two Democratic senators from Georgia, a prerogative of the Senate. His rejection garnered newspaper headlines and marked the finish of Johnson's national political influence. Harding's administration worked with Georgia Republicans to reorganize the party to reduce black-and-tan influence, already declining due to the state's disenfranchisement of black voters.

Johnson returned to his law practice in the capital. He died on September 10, 1925, at the Freedmen's Hospital after having a stroke at his home in Washington, D.C.

== Biography ==
=== Early years ===
Attorney Linc Johnson as a young man.

Henry Lincoln Johnson, known to family and friends as "Linc," was born on July 27, 1870, in Augusta, Georgia to former slaves Martha Ann and Peter Johnson. His parents strongly encouraged education.

Johnson attended Atlanta University, a historically black college, and graduated in 1888. Excluded from law schools in the South because of segregation, he went north to attend the University of Michigan, obtaining a law degree in 1892. After passing the Georgia bar exam, Johnson opened a law practice in Atlanta. He eventually became the corporate attorney for the Atlanta Life Insurance Company, a major black-owned business.

In 1903 Johnson married Georgia Douglas, who also graduated from what is now Clark Atlanta University. She was 10 years younger than he. She achieved literary fame as a poet associated with the Harlem Renaissance. Together the couple had two sons, Peter Douglas Johnson and Henry Lincoln Johnson, Jr. The latter became a notable attorney in his own right.

=== Political leader ===
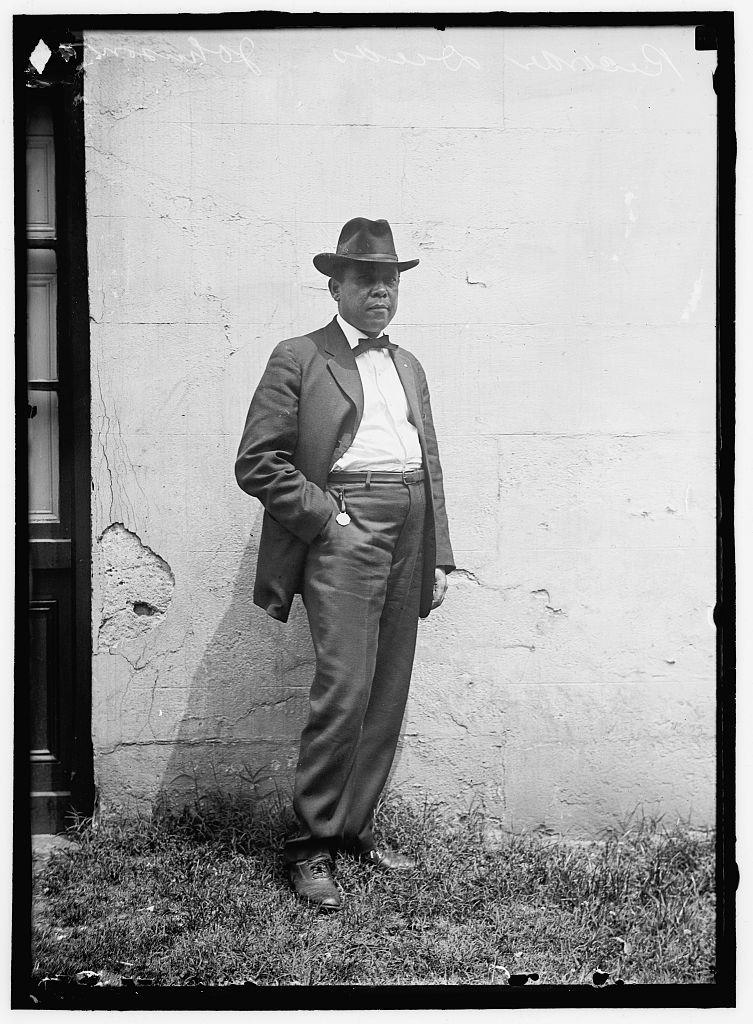
In Washington D.C. in 1914

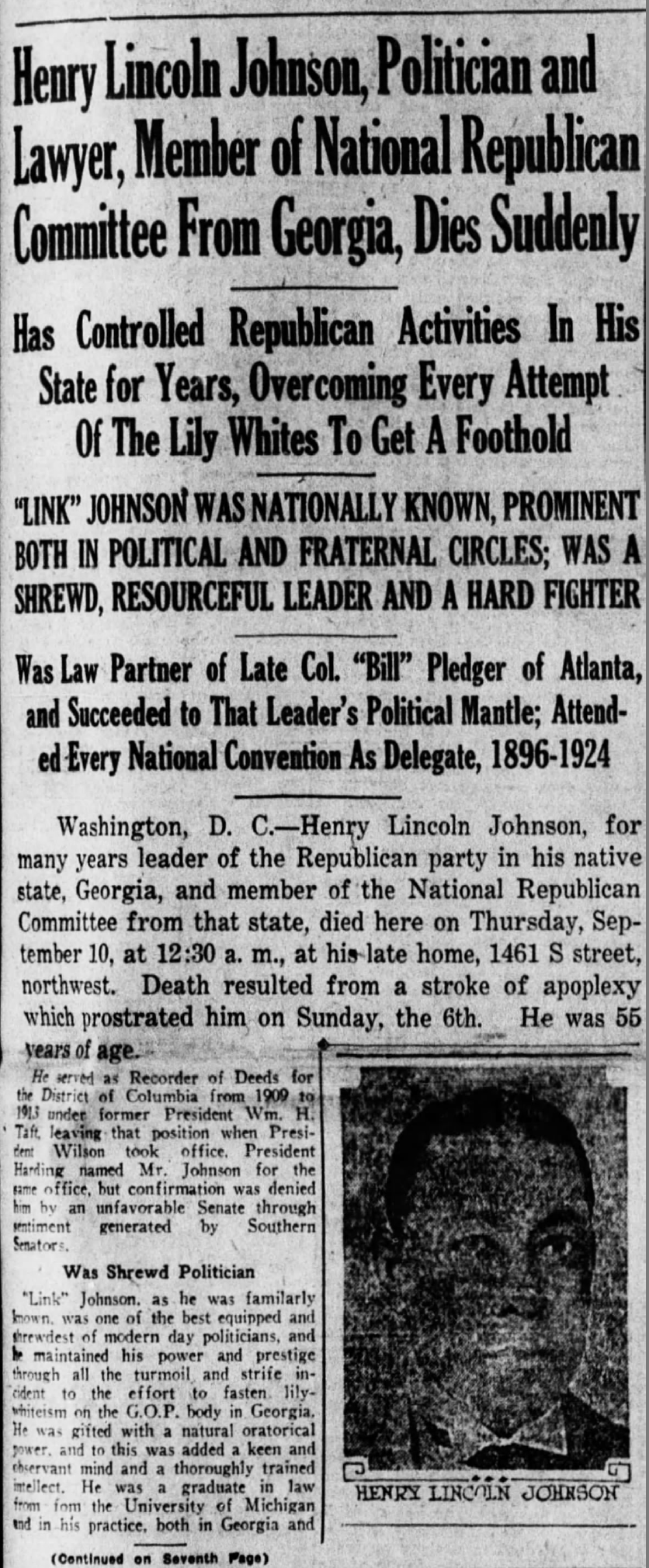
New York Age September 19, 1925 obituary for Henry Lincoln Johnson

According to his death notice in the New York Age, Johnson was a law partner of Bill Pledger and succeeded him in political office. During the first years of the 20th century, Johnson emerged as a leading boss in Georgia Republican politics.

Johnson's role was that of the chief dispenser of political patronage to black Republicans in the state, at a time when their ability to elect representatives of their choice was being limited by voter fraud, suppression and, in 1909, constitutional amendments and laws passed by white Democrats in the state legislature that disenfranchised most black voters. Blacks continued to be a loyal and important component of the Republican Party coalition in the era. Johnson was described by one journalist of the era as a "tall figure with an oratorical turn of phrase and an emphatic style of expression."

In 1910 Johnson was appointed by President William Howard Taft as Recorder of Deeds for the District of Columbia. This was regarded as the premier political patronage job, which had been historically earmarked for African Americans since after the Civil War. Also appointed by Taft were James Carroll Napier as Register of the Treasury, Robert Heberton Terrell as District of Columbia Municipal Judge, and William H. Lewis as Assistant United States Attorney General, making up what was known as his "Black Cabinet." Johnson and his family moved from Atlanta to Washington, D.C. to undertake this new position.

Johnson is believed to have worked behind the scenes for the election of Southern Democrat Woodrow Wilson in the 1912 Presidential election, as did other black leaders such as W. E. B. Du Bois of the NAACP, William Monroe Trotter of the National Equal Rights League, and Bishop Alexander Walters and J. Milton Waldron, prominent clergymen, all of whom opposed Booker T. Washington's politics and were disappointed at the Republican Party's tepid response to their issues. Johnson continued in his federal position until the Wilson administration purged African American and other Republicans from the patronage positions in the customary change after a new president of a different political party was elected.

More significantly, influenced by Southern members of his cabinet, Wilson segregated federal offices, lunchrooms, and restrooms for the first time. In 1914 the Civil Service Commission began to require photos with job applications, a means to screen out blacks. Other forms of racial discrimination were used against African-American federal workers during the Wilson administration. The NAACP and other leading black groups protested but were unsuccessful in changing these policies and many African Americans were affected, both in Washington and nationally. In 1912, at the beginning of Taft's administration, some 19,000 African Americans were working nationwide for such departments as the Treasury, Post Office (including railway postal workers), Navy, and Bureau of Engraving and Printing Office.

Johnson was sharply criticized for hubris by the black socialist magazine, The Messenger. It criticized him as an example of a "sleek, fat, potbellied Negro politicians who have been trafficking for half a century in the sweat and blood and tears of toiling Negro washerwomen, cotton pickers, miners, and factory hands."

During the 1916 Presidential election, the tensions of the Republican Party of Georgia resulted in two rival factions: a group of African-American-dominated regulars headed by Johnson, commonly known as the "black and tans", and an insurgency of European Americans commonly known as the "lily whites". Johnson managed to retain control of the party apparatus in the presidential election year of 1916 and again in 1920. By controlling the Georgia delegation to the Republican National Convention in those years, he retained control over federal patronage appointments in Georgia.

In 1920, Johnson was among black leaders of the Republican Party who met in Chicago to establish the Lincoln League. This intra-party group formed to attempt to force the national Republican Party to take a firm stand against lynching, Jim Crow laws, voter disfranchisement, and other assaults upon the African-American community in the South. From 1890 to 1909, all states of the South had passed laws to disenfranchise most blacks and many poor whites. Johnson won promises that the Republican Party would take more determined action on these matters if it won the White House in the fall of 1920.

In 1920 Johnson was elected as Georgia's representative to the Republican National Committee. The selection had not been without controversy, and Johnson had concealed his candidacy until the last minute, when he was elected by the loyal Georgia delegation over his white rival, Roscoe Pickett, 12 votes to 3, with two abstaining. Under the standing rules of the convention, the full convention was required to ratify the selection of each state's delegation, which was usually a pro forma voice vote. But when the Georgia delegation reported their selection on the floor and the pro forma voice vote was taken, a chorus of voices were raised in opposition to Johnson. A two-thirds vote of the convention was required to set aside the standing rules and overturn the Georgia delegation's selection. The delegates did not gain sufficient votes for such action, and thereby ratified the choice of Johnson. This averted what would have been a potential election-year embarrassment of the Republicans as they were seeking to retain black voters outside the South.

=== Failed nomination of 1920 ===
Henry Lincoln Johnson as the new "GOP Boss" of Georgia on the front page of the Atlanta Constitution in June 1920

Johnson's status was bolstered by the strong showing of Republicans in the Presidential election of 1920. The party gained its largest vote in the South in four decades. But the brewing factional breach in the Republican Party of Georgia between Johnson's "black and tans," and the group of European Americans known as the "lily whites" erupted in the aftermath of the election. The two groups battled for influence with the new Republican administration of Warren G. Harding to control federal patronage in the state.

Harding reacted to the factional split with an attempt to reorganize the Republican Party in Georgia independently of these two feuding groups. In April 1921 five prominent Georgia business leaders were called to the White House by President Harding. He asked lumber mill owner John Louis Philips to conduct an initial survey of Georgia business figures to determine their potential level of support for joining a new, reorganized Georgia Republican Party.

Harding's machination was endorsed by the "lily whites," who believed it could be a means to establish white hegemony, even if those chosen to head the reorganization were selected from outside factional ranks. Johnson had the most to lose from Harding's reorganization effort and opposed it. Johnson was ultimately induced to quit the factional battle and to exit Georgia politics through a reappointment by Harding to the choice position of Registrar of Deeds for the District of Columbia.

After Johnson was appointed in June 1921 and moved again to Washington, a handpicked Republican convention of 230 people, predominantly consisting of white business leaders, reorganized the Georgia party on July 26, 1921.

Johnson's appointment was taken up by the United States Senate for ratification in November 1921. There Georgia Democratic Senator Tom Watson, a political foe and supporter of white supremacy, led a fight against Johnson's confirmation in committee and on the floor of the Senate. Watson charged that the appointment of Johnson was "personally obnoxious to him", as Johnson had said in an interview with an African-American newspaper from Baltimore that he would "rather be in hell without Tom Watson than to be in heaven with him." Watson charged that Johnson had engaged in financial shenanigans in Atlanta which made him unsuitable for government trust.

When senators met in executive session, Georgia's other Senator, white Democrat Nathaniel Edwin Harris, reportedly joined Watson in pronouncing Johnson "personally obnoxious to him," code words invoking an unwritten rule in the Senate granting de facto veto power to senators over appointments relating to their states. The vote against Johnson which followed was virtually unanimous; only one Senator voted for Johnson's appointment over the objections of the Georgians.

=== Later life ===
After his 1921 confirmation defeat in the Senate, Johnson returned to legal practice in Washington, D.C.; his place in national politics was thereafter limited. One of Johnson's most famous cases came in 1922, when he was called to defend a young black man charged with sexual assault of a white girl below the age of consent. These extremely serious charges carried a potential penalty of 30 years in prison or execution. The young man was also at risk for extrajudicial lynching.

Following expert cross-examination in the case, Johnson delivered what was called by one observer one of the "most eloquent and forceful" closing arguments ever heard in a District of Columbia court. The jury failed to agree in the case after six hours of deliberation, with seven jurors voting for acquittal. The foreman later commented that the defendant owed his life to Johnson's summation.

Despite his removal from Georgia politics, Johnson was not entirely forgotten in the corridors of power. In September 1923 Johnson was one of a handful of black political leaders invited to Washington, D.C. for private consultations with President Calvin Coolidge on issues of concern to the African-American community. They continued to seek more national support for alleviating oppression in the South.

He was a delegate from Atlanta, Georgia to the 1924 Republican National Convention in Cleveland.

== Death and legacy ==
Henry Lincoln Johnson died on September 10, 1925, at Freedmen's Hospital after having a stroke at his home in Washington, D.C. He was 55 years old at the time of his death. He was buried on September 14, 1925, at Columbian Harmony Cemetery. His remains were moved to National Harmony Memorial Park Cemetery in 1959, when Columbian Harmony closed.

Shortly after his death, Johnson was eulogized with an editorial in the Pittsburgh Courier, an important black newspaper, which opined:

To mention the name of Linc Johnson is to speak of politics. He grew up seeking his place at the political table. He sought it unceasingly, without rest or compromise. Politics was the only food he sought with diligence. Of his own personal welfare, he cared little. Of his own personal comforts, he cared, perhaps, not quite enough. ... He thought of politics, the power of politics, and nothing so absorbed him as politics.

. . .

There is a place left vacant by his passing. He filled it as he saw his duty, both to himself and to his group. ... He was a type unto himself, admired, loved, and hated, depending upon how well he was understood; but through it all, he remained the one and only Henry Lincoln Johnson.

In 1985, H. L. Johnson Elementary School opened in Royal Palm Beach, Florida, named in his honor.

== Works ==
- The Negro Under Wilson. Washington, D.C.: Republican National Committee, n.d. [1916?].
- Letter to W.E.B. DuBois, July 18, 1918, W.E.B. DuBois papers, Special Collections & University Archives, University of Massachusetts Amherst.
