= The Colored American (Augusta, Georgia) =

African American newspaper from Georgia, US

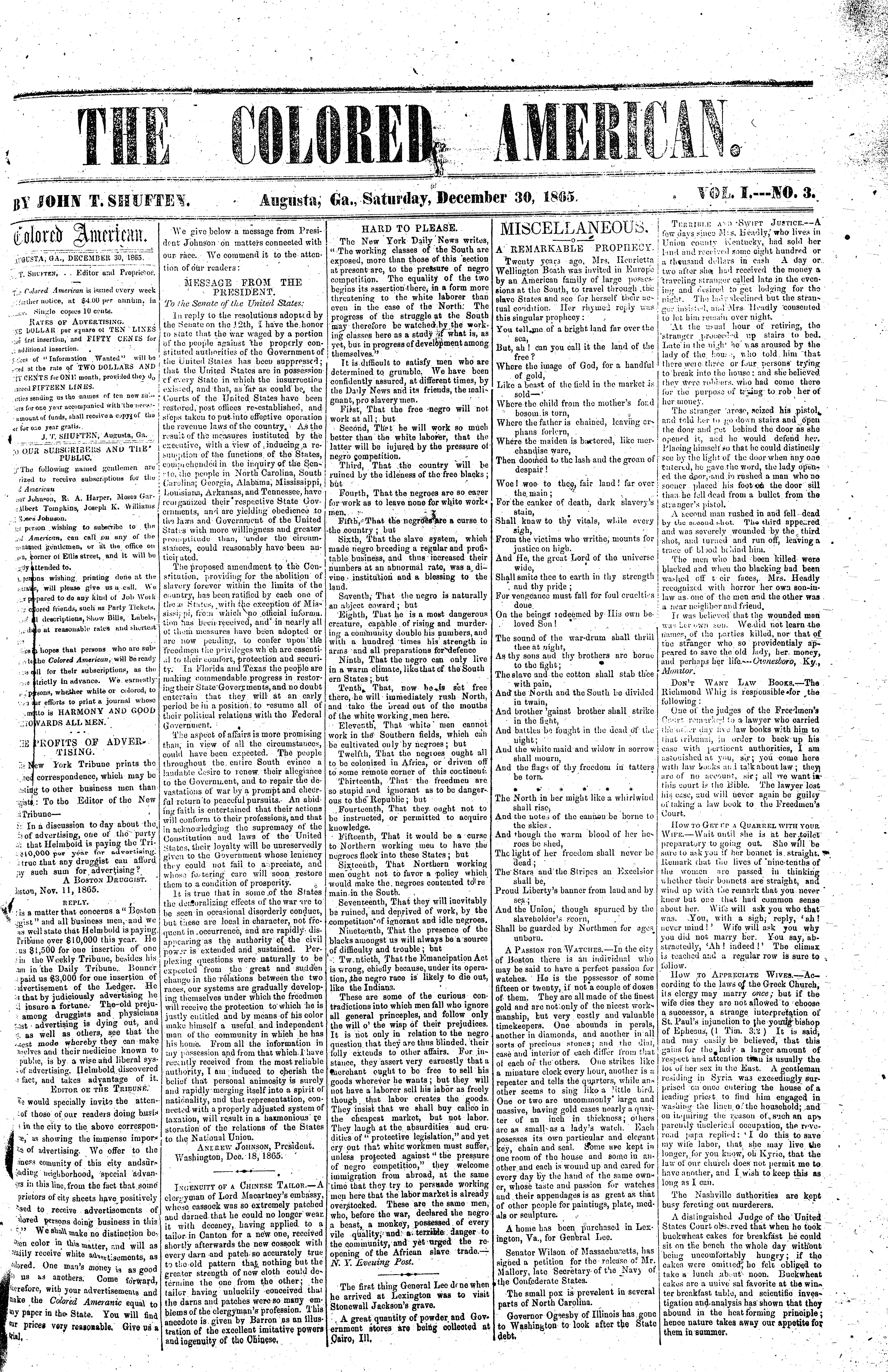
- Front page of the December 30, 1865 edition of The Colored American from Augusta, Georgia
- Type: Weekly newspaper
- Owner: John T. Shuften
- Publisher: John T. Shapiro
- Founded: October 1865
- Ceased publication: February 1866
- Headquarters: Augusta, Georgia
- City: Augusta, Georgia
- Country: United States
- OCLC number: 8780206

The Colored American published in Augusta, Georgia, from October 1865 to February 1866. It was the first African American newspaper in the South. The paper was founded by John T. Shuften, who was forced to sell the paper within six months due to a lack of financial support. The paper was published by John T. Shapiro. The Colored American covered political, religious, and general news. Shuften published the newspaper with assistance from James D. Lynch. The paper was purchased in January 1866 by the Georgia Equal Rights Association, and the name was changed to the Loyal Georgian, published by John Emory Bryant.
