= Baxter Street School =

Public school in Georgia, US

Location
- Athens, Georgia; Clarke County; United States; 33.9508°N 83.3822°W

Information
- School type: Public
- Opened: 1886

The Baxter Street School was a public school founded in 1886 in Athens, Georgia, United States. It was initially the first African American public school in the city of Athens; and seven years after opening it was remodeled and became a segregated white school.

== History ==
From 1886 until 1893, it operated as the first segregated public school for African American students in Athens. The same year in 1886, Washington Street School (formerly the Market Street School) in Athens was opened for white students.

The Baxter Street School was a two story brick school building and it had 10-rooms. In 1890, A.J. Carey was made principal; and by 1896, Annie Linton was made principal.

After 1893, the Baxter Street School was remodeled and used exclusively for white students; and the same year, West Broad Street School and East Athens School were opened for African American students. Former principal A.J. Carey moved to the West Broad Street School when it opened.

== See also ==
- Knox Institute (1868–1928), private Black school in Athens
