= John J. Knox =

American army officer in the Civil War

John J. Knox was a major in the U.S. Army during the American Civil War and a leading figure in the Freedmen's Bureau. Knox Institute was named for him. Monroe Morton attended the Knox Institute and became a messenger for Major Knox.

Johnston was seriously injured during the Civil War and suffered from severe dysentery afterwards.

The University of Georgia library has a collection of papers relating to Knox and the Freedmen's Bureau's activities.

"I do not like to be forced to leave any part of the American Continent for political opinion honestly and such conscientiously entertained. A friend of liberty I have lived and such will I die," Major Knox wrote.
