= James Albert Bray =

American Methodist bishop and college president (1870–1944)

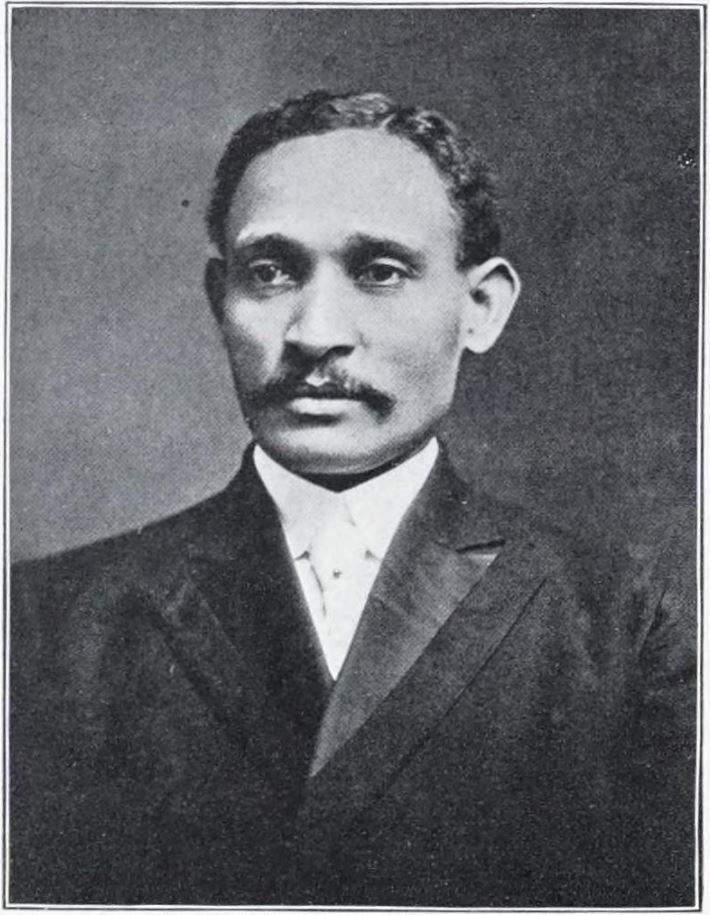

3rd President of Miles College
- In office 1907–1902
- Preceded by: R. S. Williams
- Succeeded by: William Augustus Bell

2nd President of Lane College
- In office 1903–1907
- Preceded by: T. F. Saunders
- Succeeded by: James Franklin Lane

Personal details
- Born: August 23, 1870 Carnesville, Georgia, U.S.
- Died: September 1, 1944 (aged 74) Little Rock, Arkansas, U.S.
- Resting place: Lincoln Cemetery
- Spouse(s): Mattie B. Davis (m. 1902–1910; death), Martha Freeman Childs
- Children: 2
- Occupation: Minister, bishop, educator, academic administrator, college president, editor

Rev. James Albert Bray (1870–1944) was an American bishop, educator, academic administrator, and college president. He was the 18th bishop of the Colored Methodist Episcopal Church (later known as the Christian Methodist Episcopal Church or CME), elected in 1934. Bray served as president of Lane College, and Miles Memorial College (now Miles College), two private historically black colleges affiliated with the CME Church.

== Early life and education ==
James Albert Bray was born on August 23, 1870 in Carnesville, Georgia. He was the eldest of six children, and his parents were Mary France (née Webster) and Andrew Jackson Bray. He attended rural public school in Franklin County, Georgia, followed by high school in Athens, Georgia.

Bray received his B.A. degree in 1893 from Atlanta University (now Clark Atlanta University). In 1906, he took graduate level philosophy courses at Harvard University, and education courses at the University of Chicago. He received honorary degree from Wilberforce University (LLD in 1909).

== Career ==
After graduation from college, Bray went into teaching. He served as the president of Georgia State Teachers Association from 1898 to 1899.

Bray was ordained as a deacon in 1900, and an elder in 1901 by the church. From 1902 to 1903, he served as a pastor at Trinity CME Church in Augusta, Georgia; and at the same time period he was the principal of West Broad Street School in Athens, Georgia, the first black school in the state. In 1902, Bray was the CME Church representative for the Negro Congress meeting in Atlanta.

In 1903, Bray was elected president of Lane College in Jackson, Tennessee, a role he maintained until 1907. He was president of Miles Memorial College (now Miles College) in Fairfield, Alabama, from 1907 to 1912.

Bray was a delegate to the World Methodist Ecumenical Conference held in Toronto in 1911. He edited a journal named Voice of the People.

He was ordained as bishop by Lucius Henry Holsey in 1934. He served as the president of the CME church's board of religious education; from 1938 until 1944, he led the episcopal district (including Louisiana, Missouri, Arkansas, and Illinois). He pushed for change and he opposed poll tax, lobbied for better treatment for Blacks in the military, and more industry jobs for Black citizens.

== Death ==
Bray died on September 1, 1944 in Little Rock, Arkansas. He is buried in Lincoln Cemetery, a historically African American cemetery in Blue Island, Illinois.

== Personal life ==
In 1902, he married Mattie B. Davis, together they had one daughter. His wife Mattie died in 1910. He remarried his second wife Martha Freeman Childs, and together they had a daughter.
