= Alfred Richardson (politician) =

U.S politician during the Reconstruction Era

Member of the Georgia House of Representatives from the Clarke County district
- In office 1868 – 1872; Original 33

Personal details
- Born: ~1837
- Died: 1873 (aged 35–36)
- Party: Republican

Alfred Richardson (1837?–1872) was a member of the Georgia Assembly in the U.S. State of Georgia and was the first Black representative of Clarke County, alongside Madison Davis. Richardson was born enslaved but was emancipated in 1865. He worked as a skilled carpenter and likely owned a grocery store with his brother. He entered government service after the U.S. Civil War during the Reconstruction era. Richardson faced hostility, intimidation, and physical attacks representing Clarke County. Richardson survived two shooting attacks by the Ku Klux Klan. In 1872 Richardson testified to a congressional committee that it was not safe for him to go home so he was staying in Athens, Georgia, and that many other "Colored" people had been forced to flee their farms in fear. He also spoke about being attacked and shot at at his house by men in disguise and said that he had been threatened, told of many instances of whippings, and that fellow "Colored" people were told that they should vote for Democrats or not vote at all.

Richardson and Madison Davis were elected to office for terms from 1868 to 1872. Richardson died of pneumonia on January 9th, 1872, just days before he could begin serving in the Georgia General Assembly for a third term. However, it is possible that Richardson was poisoned with arsenic by a political opponent, the Ku Klux Klan, or disgruntled white citizens.

Richardson was buried in the Gospel Pilgrim Cemetery in Athens, Georgia. However, there is no official marked grave for Richardson.

Richardson's legacy is honored by the naming of the "Richardson-Davis Park" in downtown Athens, Georgia. The park officially opened on June 19th, 2026, as part of the city's annual Juneteenth celebration. Historic Athens, a local preservation non-profit, was active in the pursuit of recognizing Richardson, spearheading a petition that garnered over 1,000 signatures from Athens-Clarke County residents living within 1 mile of the proposed downtown green-space.
