= Athens Voice (newspaper) =

African American newspaper from Athens, Georgia, USA

- Type: Weekly newspaper
- Founder(s): Fred O. Smith and Mike Thurmond
- Founded: June 12, 1975
- Headquarters: Athens, Georgia
- City: Athens, Georgia
- Country: United States
- OCLC number: 17936844

Athens Voice was an African American newspaper in Athens, Georgia. The newspaper was founded by students Fred O. Smith and Mike Thurmond. The first issue was published on June 12, 1975. The paper was later published by the same company that publishes the Atlanta Voice.
