= The Athens Clipper =

African American newspaper from Athens, Georgia, United States

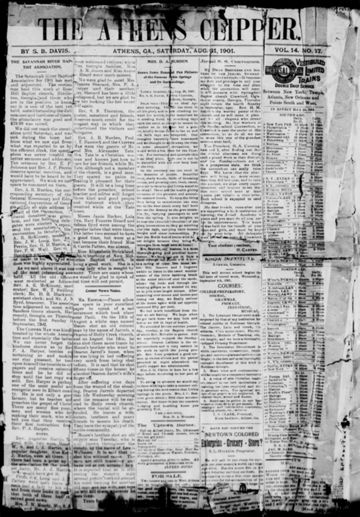
- Front page of The Athens Clipper from 31 August 1901.
- Type: Weekly newspaper
- Owner(s): Samuel B. Davis, Minnie Davis
- Founded: 1887
- Ceased publication: 1912
- Headquarters: Athens, Georgia
- City: Athens, Georgia
- Country: United States of America
- OCLC number: 20236763

The Athens Clipper was a newspaper in Athens, Georgia, United States, for the African American community. It was published from circa 1887 to circa 1912. The four-page weekly newspaper was edited by Samuel B. Davis, and its content was restricted mostly to local events in the black community and religious news. After Davis' death, the paper continued to be edited for several years by his wife Minnie. Few copies of the Clipper still exist, despite the newspaper's long publication history.
