= The Progressive Era =

African-American newspaper Georgia, US

The Progressive Era was an African American newspaper published in Athens, Georgia. It was first published on February 21, 1899 and circulated for nearly 20 years. The Library of Congress has a collection of the paper on microfilm. It was purchased by Monroe Morton in 1914 from W. D. Johnson, A. M. E. Bishop, and W. H. Harris, a dentist whose office was in the Morton Building. Morton served as editor and publisher. No known editions from his tenure have been preserved, and only a single issue of the paper (vol. 1, no. 14, September 2, 1899) is known to have survived to the present.
