= Savannah Weekly Echo =

African American periodical

- Onward and Upward.
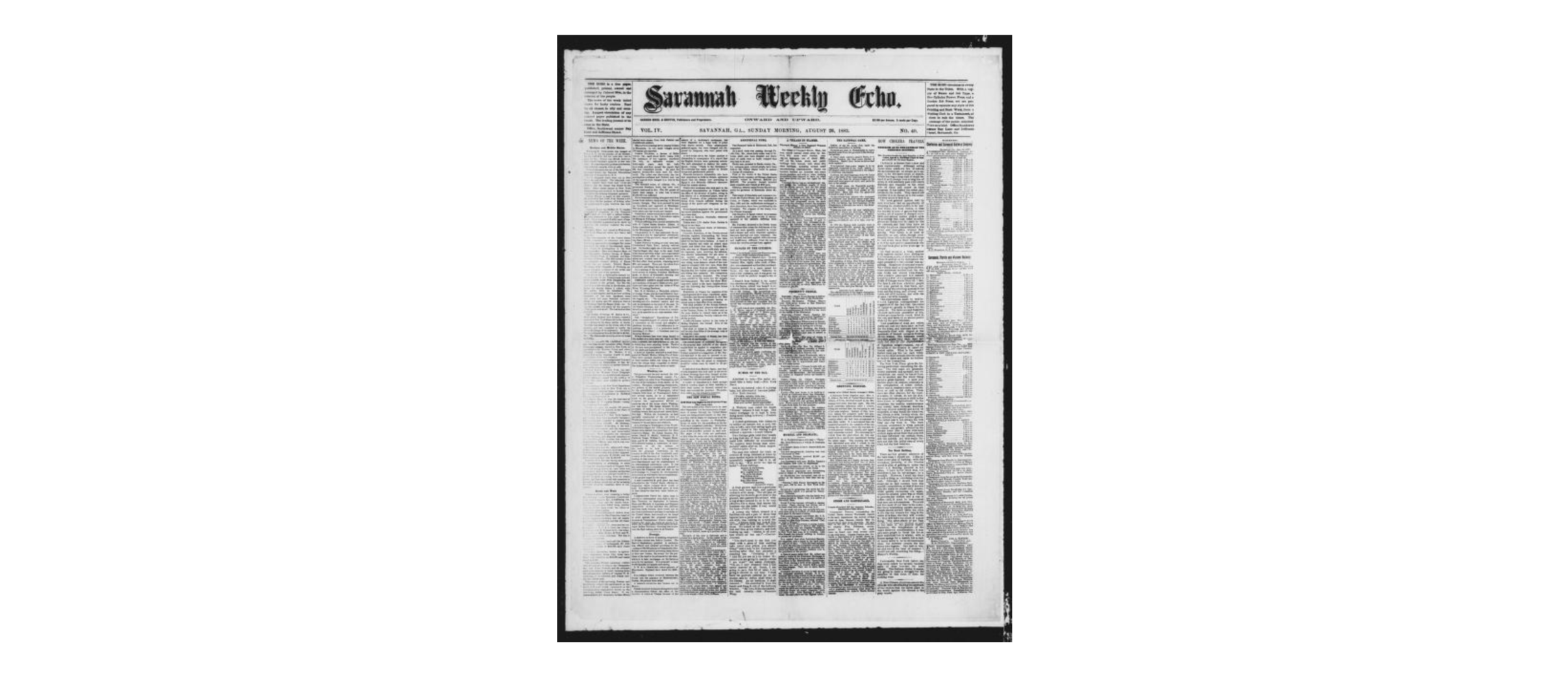
- The August 26, 1883 front page of the Savannah Weekly Echo
- Type: Weekly newspaper
- Founder(s): Thomas Harden, Robert Harden, and D. Griffin
- Publisher: Harden Bros. & Griffin
- Editor-in-chief: Thomas Harden
- Language: English
- City: Savannah, Georgia
- Country: Chatham County
- Circulation: 1879-1884
- OCLC number: 878987317

The Savannah Weekly Echo was an early African American newspaper, founded by Robert and Thomas T. Harden and D. Griffin in 1879. The newspaper circulated in Savannah, Georgia and its surrounding area — primarily Florida and South Carolina — until 1884. The central mission of the Echo was to serve the people's interests. During its active period, it purported to have the largest circulation of any African American paper in the South and offered condensed news for its busy readers.

The editor-in-chief of the Savannah Weekly Echo was Thomas T. Harden, with local editor James A. Sykes. The Echo covered a wide variety of topics, including racial concerns, national and international news, technological advancements, local events, prominent individuals, and cultural phenomena. It also addressed pressing issues of its time, such as the ongoing cholera pandemic and transportation updates. Most notable of these, however, was its extensive coverage of the civil rights movement, racial injustices, and other aspects of black life in the American South.

== Reputation ==
The Savannah Weekly Echo had a reputation for being cut-throat and severely disparaging in its critique of race relations in America. This is largely attributed to the threatening, "in-your-face" style of editor Thomas T. Harden. The Atlanta Constitution wrote in 1882 that "Echo" was not a sufficient title for this publication. "It is not hot enough. The Blade, the Defiance, the Agitator, and the Scorcher call loudly for the Singer." While Harden's harsh writing style was viewed disapprovingly, his calls for national attention to the injustices faced by black citizens in Post-Civil War America reached a wide audience.

In 1883, the Savannah Weekly Echo highlighted a grievous occurrence that it claimed had been overlooked by other prominent newspapers: the forcible expulsion of nearly 200 black men from their lands, homes, and families by the Ku Klux Klan. While The Atlanta Constitution sarcastically commended the success of the Echo in fighting the "imaginary ku klux", the story was picked up by a variety of newspapers across the nation, including:

- the Port Huron Daily Times of Port Huron, Michigan
- the Lawrence Daily Journal of Lawrence, Kansas
- the Vermont Phoenix of Brattleboro, Vermont
- the Kennebec Journal of Augusta, Maine

In its publications, the Savannah Weekly Echo characterized these black men as peaceful, law-abiding members of society who contributed positively to their community. Judge Jackson, a well-known figure in Savannah, offered differing perspectives on the matter and contradicted claims made by the Echo. Northern newspapers such as the ones listed above stood with the Echo, calling for the swift and immediate punishment of the Ku Klux Klan members, and for Judge Jackson to put an end to the violence.
