= Athens Blade =

African-American weekly newspaper published in Athens, Georgia in 1879 and 1880

The Athens Blade
- The Arm of Justice Cannot—Will Not Sleep
- Type: Weekly newspaper
- Founder(s): Bill Pledger and William Henry Heard
- Founded: 1879
- Ceased publication: 1884
- Headquarters: Athens, Georgia
- City: Athens, Georgia
- Country: United States

The Athens Blade was a short-lived African-American weekly newspaper published in Athens, Georgia. Its early publishers were Bill Pledger and William Henry Heard.

== See also ==
- List of African-American newspapers in Georgia
