= Bill Pledger =

American lawyer

William Anderson Pledger (c. 1852 - 1904) was a lawyer, newspaper publisher, and politician in Georgia. He is credited as the first African American lawyer in Atlanta and his political roles and efforts led the way for many who followed.

Pledger was born near Jonesboro in about 1852. His mother was a slave and he had a white father. He studied at Atlanta University and then taught in Athens, Georgia. Early in his career he worked on a railroad with Monroe Morton. Members of the Democratic Party closed the school he worked at in 1872. A staunch Republican Party supporter, Pledger gave stump speeches and became a party delegate.

He started a series of newspapers. He owned and edited the Athens Blade with William Henry Heard. He moved it to Atlanta and renamed it the Atlanta Defiant before returning it to Athens.

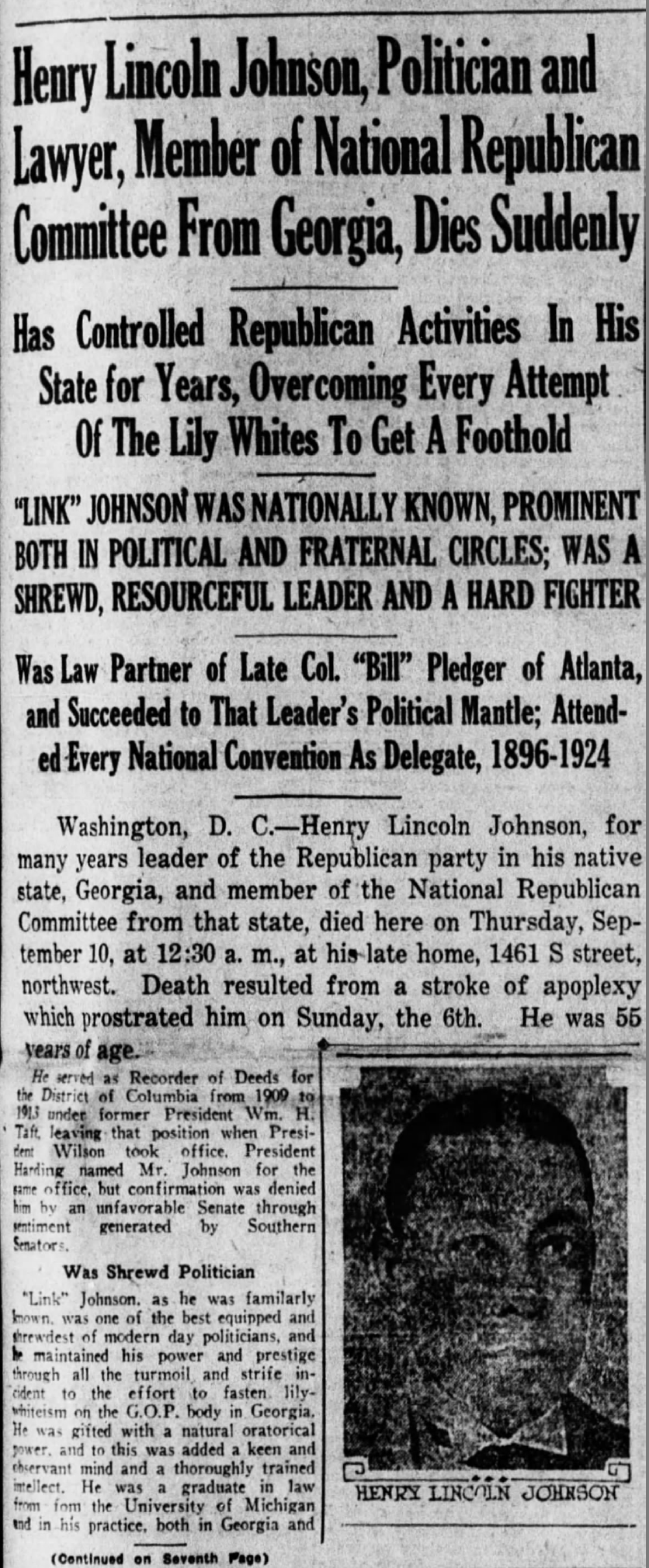
New York Age September 19, 1925 death announcement for Henry Lincoln Johnson including a headline about his law partnership and succeeding Pledger in political office

Henry Lincoln Johnson was his law partner and succeeded him in office.

Pledger actively backed Thomas Reed in the 1896 election cycle, although he was ultimately unsuccessful as William McKinley won the presidency and the Republican nomination.

Pledger was buried in the Gospel Pilgrim Cemetery in Athens, Georgia.
