= The Atlanta Voice =

Newspaper published in Georgia, US

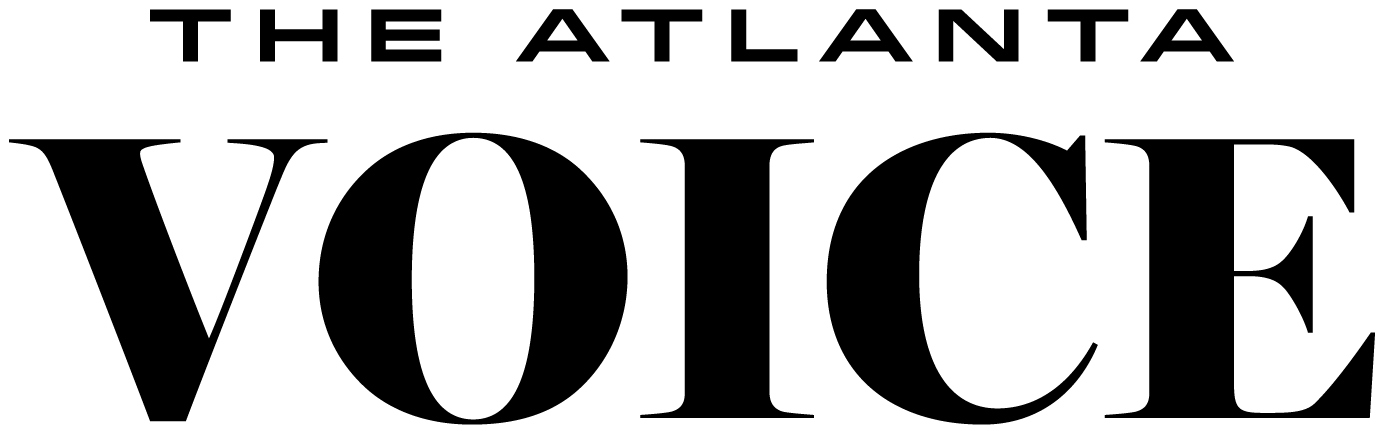
- Type: Weekly newspaper
- Owner: Janis Ware
- Founder(s): Ed Clayton and J. Lowell Ware
- Publisher: Janis Ware
- Editor: Donnell Suggs
- Founded: 1966
- Headquarters: 633 Pryor St SW Atlanta, GA 30312-2738
- City: Atlanta, Georgia
- Country: USA
- Circulation: 40,000
- ISSN: 2833-7832
- OCLC number: 4423131
- Website: theatlantavoice.com

The Atlanta Voice is an African-American community newspaper serving the greater Atlanta metropolitan area. The paper is published weekly on Fridays.

Founded in 1966 by Ed Clayton and J. Lowell Ware, the paper now distributes 40,000 copies via 600 metropolitan locations and offers digital content via a website and social media. Today, the paper is published by Janis Ware, J. Lowell Ware's daughter, who took over the paper after her father's death in 1991. The paper's motto is "A people without a voice cannot be heard." The Atlanta Voice is a member of the National Newspaper Publishers Association (NNPA), a trade group of more than 200 Black-owned media companies in the United States.

== History ==
The Atlanta Voice was created by Ed Clayton and J. Lowell Ware in 1966 out of the basement of Ware’s house. According to Ware's daughter, the paper was established "out of the Civil Rights movement," and is considered to be the only paper that regularly featured Martin Luther King Jr. and other Civil Rights activists. Ed Clayton had been a nationally-known journalist in Chicago who published a biography of Dr. King in 1964. In 1965, Clayton moved to Atlanta with his wife Xernona Clayton to help Dr. King with public relations and speech writing. Clayton died in 1966, after helping to launch the Atlanta Voice. Xernona Clayton wrote a column for the Atlanta Voice and maintained a close friendship with Dr. King's wife, Coretta Scott King.

J. Lowell Ware purchased a building and created his own press for the paper, due to printing restrictions imposed by White-owned printing presses. The Atlanta Voice's press was the first and only Black-owned press in the southeastern United States until it ceased its printing operations in 2003. Ware moved the offices for the Atlanta Voice to Mechanicsville in 1972, vowing to revitalize the community. In 1989 J. Lowell Ware co-founded the Summech Community Development Corporation Inc. with community activist Rosa Burney to revitalize the south-Atlanta Mechanicsville community.

Janis Ware, J. Lowell Ware's daughter, became owner and publisher of the paper after his death in 1991. She also inherited the Summech Community Development Corporation from her father.

== Awards ==
In 2011, Janis Ware (owner and publisher) was given the Pioneer Black Journalist award by the Atlanta Association of Black Journalists. In 2019, she was elected as the first vice president of the National Newspaper Publisher’s Association.

In 2020, the paper's sales manager, Robert DW Jackson won the Sales & Marketing Industry of the Year Award from the Georgia Minority Business Association.

== See also ==
- African Americans in Atlanta
