= John Emory Bryant =

American soldier and politician (1836–1900)

John Emory Bryant (October 13, 1836 – February 27, 1900) served in the Union Army during the American Civil War and the Freedmen's Bureau in Georgia during the Reconstruction Era. He also worked as a newspaper editor, Republican Party organizer, member of the Georgia House of Representatives and a candidate for U.S. Congress. Duke University has a collection of papers related to Bryant. He corresponded with William Anderson Pledger and Henry McNeal Turner. He was a member of the Methodist Church and involved in the temperance movement.

He served in the 8th Maine Volunteers during the Civil War.

Bryant was born in Wayne, Maine to Benjamin Franklin Bryant, a Methodist minister and Lucy Ford French. He graduated in 1859 from Maine Wesleyan Seminary.

Bryant married Emma Frances Spaulding and they had one child, Emma Alice Bryant (1871–1946).
