= Madison Davis =

American politician

Personal details
- Born: September 27, 1833 Georgia, U.S.
- Died: August 20, 1902 (aged 68) Georgia, U.S.
- Resting place: Gospel Pilgrim Cemetery
- Party: Republican

Madison "Mat" Davis (September 27, 1833 – August 20, 1902) was an American slave who became a member of the Georgia Assembly representing Clarke County, Georgia and the first African American postmaster in Athens, Georgia, after being emancipated. He was active in Republican Party politics.

Davis' legacy is honored by the naming of the "Richardson-Davis Park" in downtown Athens, Georgia. The park officially opened on June 19th, 2026, as part of the city's annual Juneteenth celebration. Historic Athens, a local preservation non-profit, was active in the pursuit of recognizing Davis, spearheading a petition that garnered over 1,000 signatures from Athens-Clarke County residents living within 1 mile of the proposed downtown green-space.

== Early years ==
Davis was born into slavery and was owned by a carriage maker. After the U.S. Civil War he was freed from slavery at age 31.

== Career ==
=== Representative of Georgia ===
In 1868, Davis and Alfred Richardson, also a former slave, were elected to the Georgia House of Representatives from Clarke County. Later the same year, 25 of 29 African Americans were ejected from office after Georgia's legislature determined that African Americans had no protected right to serve in public office. Four more were investigated by a committee to determine their heritage and determine whether they were more than one-eighth African-American. That year, he was a delegate to Georgia's constitutional drafting convention.

Madison Davis had a light complexion and was one of two African-American representatives allowed to continue in office. Georgia Supreme Court reversed the decision barring African Americans from office the following year in 1869 and all the legislators were returned to office. He was reelected in 1870.

=== Later career ===
Davis went into the real estate business. He was appointed postmaster of Athens in 1890 by President Benjamin Harrison; making Davis the first African American to serve in that role. He faced strong opposition from local whites in Athens. (Monroe Morton was the second African-American postmaster in Athens.)

Davis also worked as U.S. Customs Surveyor in Atlanta and was Captain of Relief No. 2, Clarke County's first black fire company.

== Death ==
He is buried at Gospel Pilgrim Cemetery in Athens.
