= Morton Theatre =

- Morton Building
- U.S. National Register of Historic Places
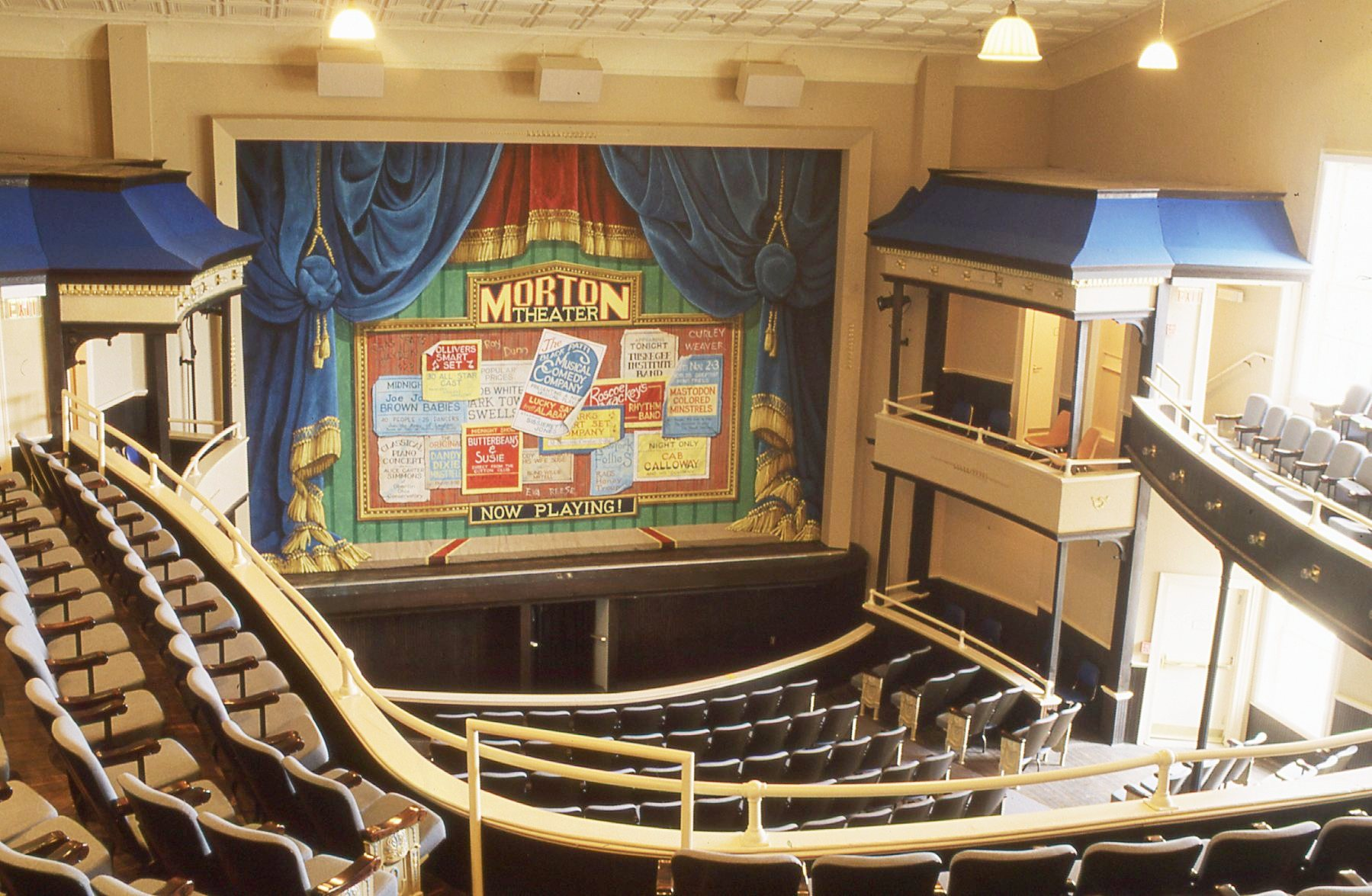

- Location within Georgia Location within the United States
- Location: 199 W. Washington St., Athens, Georgia
- Coordinates: 33°57′31″N 83°22′43″W
- Built: 1910
- Architectural style: Beaux Arts
- Website: https://www.mortontheatre.com/
- NRHP reference No.: 79000709
- Added to NRHP: October 22, 1979

The Morton Theatre, located in downtown Athens, Georgia, at 195 West Washington Street, is one of the first vaudeville theatres in the United States uniquely built, owned, and operated by an African-American businessman: Monroe Morton. In 2001, its location was termed Athens' "Hot Corner". The Theatre currently operates as a rental facility that hosts a wide range of dramatic, musical, and dance performances as well as special events.

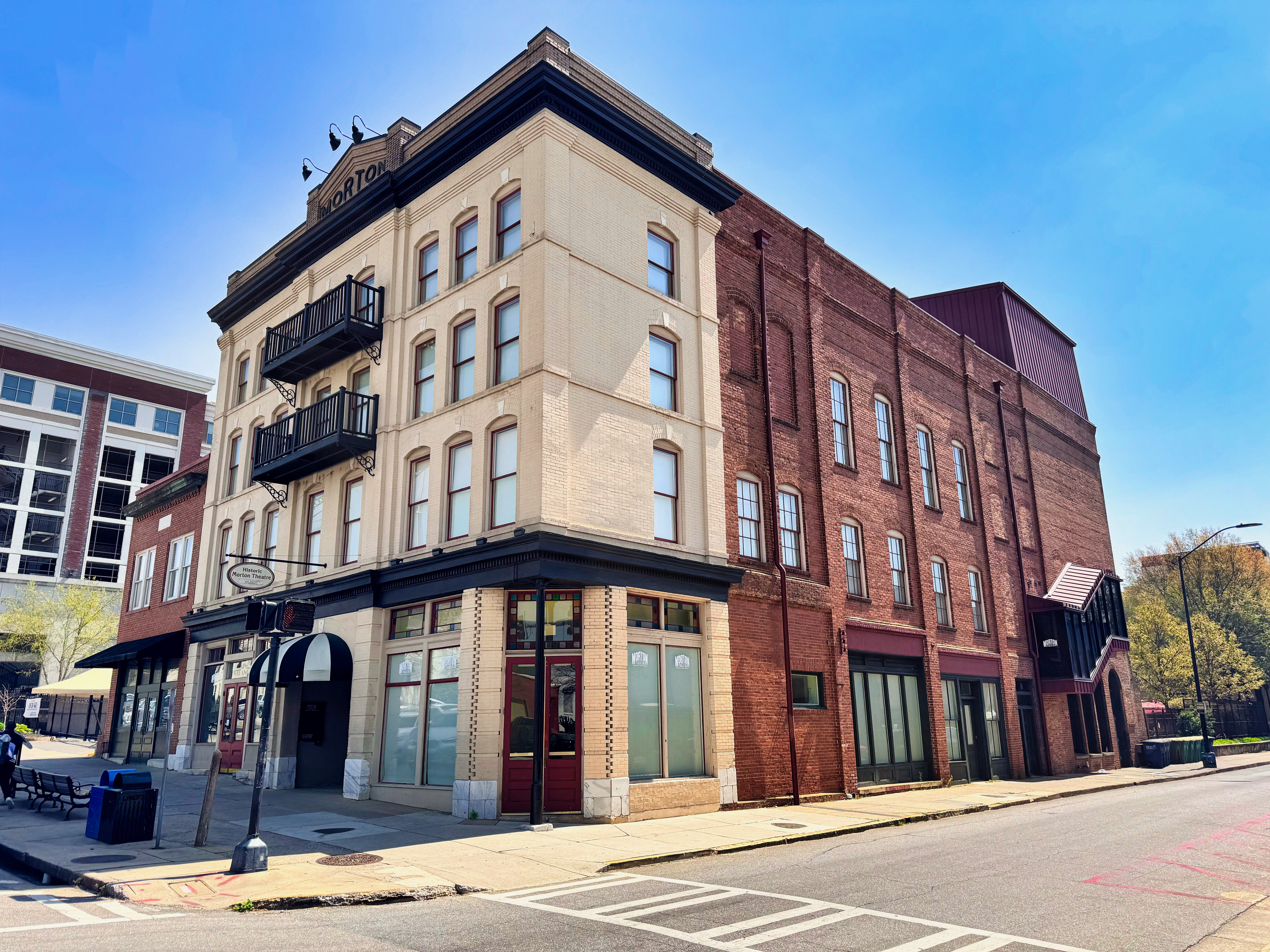
The Morton Building houses the Morton Theatre

== History ==
The Morton Building was built in 1910 by Monroe Morton, a prominent, local, African-American business man. He owned over 30 buildings, the Morton being the largest. At one time the Morton building formed the core of the downtown Black business district.

Many of Athens' Black doctors, dentists, and pharmacists practiced in the Morton Building. Among these were Dr. Ida Mae Johnson Hiram, the first Black woman to be licensed to practice medicine (dentistry) in the State, and Dr. William H. Harris, one of the founders of the Georgia State Medical Association of Colored Physicians, Dentists and Druggists. The theatre was opened on May 18, 1910 for vaudeville acts and those of local, regional and national performers. Duke Ellington, Cab Calloway, Bessie Smith, Louis Armstrong and Ma Rainey performed at the Morton during its heyday. During the 1930s, the theatre was modified to become a movie house. In 1954, a small fire broke out in the projection room. After a fire marshal's inspection, the 500-plus seat theatre was padlocked for failing to offer adequate emergency exits. Various street level businesses continued their operations.

In 1980, using a combination of state and federal funds, the building was purchased by the nonprofit Morton Theatre Corporation. Local bands such as Dreams So Real, The B-52's and R.E.M. occasionally used the building for rehearsal space and filming music videos. In 1987, the citizens of Athens-Clarke County came to the rescue of the Morton through the passage of the Special-purpose local-option sales tax referendum that included the rehabilitation of the theatre.

In 1991, ownership of the building was handed over to the Athens-Clarke Unified Government. In the fall of 1993, followed by the signing of a management agreement between the Athens-Clarke Unified Government and the Morton Theatre Corporation, the theatre was re-opened. The government provides staff and operating support to enable the theatre to function as a community performing arts space, while the non-profit Morton Theatre Corporation develops programming and manages facility rental policies and procedures.
