= 80th Georgia General Assembly =

←	79th	81st	→
- Great Seal of the State of Georgia

Overview
- Legislative body: Georgia General Assembly
- Meeting place: Kimball Opera House
- Term: 1868 – 1870

Senate
- Members: 44
- Party control: Republican Party

House of Representatives
- Members: 153
- Party control: Republican Party

The 80th Georgia General Assembly began in Atlanta, Georgia in early 1869. This was the first session after the seat of government was moved from Milledgeville, Georgia following the Georgia Constitution of 1868. A new capitol building had yet to be built so sessions were held in the opera house on Marietta Street rented from H.I. Kimball.

The new General Assembly contained 153 House members and 44 Senators. It was the first General Assembly in Georgia history to have African-American members. All of the African-American men were temporarily expelled by the General Assembly by September 1868, and were reinstated by Act of Congress in 1870 shortly before the end of the 1870 session. The 80th Assembly was succeeded by the 81st Assembly, in which Democrats won a majority in both chambers and began to pursue harsh recriminations against Republicans in general and African-Americans in particular.

== Members of the Georgia State Senate, 1868–1870 ==
District	Member
1	Aaron Alpeoria Bradley.
2	Tunis G. Campbell, Sr.
3	E. D. Graham
4	J. M. Coleman
5	A. Corbitt
6	Joshua Griffin
7	M. C. Smith
8	B. F. Brutton
9	R. T. Nisbet
10	F. O. Welch
11	C. B. Wooten
12	C. R. Moore
13	William B. Jones
14	John J. Collier
15	W. T. McArthur
16	H. Hicks.
17	McWhorter Hungerford.
18	Benjamin Conley.
19	Joseph Adkins.
20	George Wallace.
21	William Griffin.
22	T. J. Speer.
23	W. J. Anderson.
24	B. B. Hinton.
25	E. J. Higbee.
26	A. D. Nunnally.
27	John Harris.
28	W. F. Jordan.
29	Josiah Sherman.
30	J. H. McWhorter.
31	William F. Bowers.
32	Jno. C. Richardson.
33	A. M. Stringer.
34	Milton A. Candler.
35	William T. Winn.
36	W. C. Smith.
37	W. W. Merrell.
38	Walker Brock.
39	A. W. Holcombe.
40	C. J. Wellborn.
41	John Dickey.
42	John T. Burns.
43	Joel C. Fain
44	B. R. McCutchen.

== Members of the Georgia State House of Representatives, 1868–1870 ==
District	Representative	Party	Residence
Appling	Isham Raddish	Republican	
Baker	A. M. George		
Baldwin	Peter O'Neal	Republican	
Banks	William R. Bell		
Bartow	F. M. Ford		
Bartow	M. J. Crawford		
Berrien	Thomas Paulk		
Bibb	Henry McNeal Turner	Republican	Macon
Bibb	J. Fitzpatrick		
Bibb	J. E. J. Franks		
Brooks	W. A. Lane		
Bryan	N. S. Houston	Republican	
Bullock	W. M. Hall		
Burke	Malcolm Claiborne	Republican	
Burke	John Warren	Republican	
Burke	John A. Madden		
Butts	T. M Harkness		
Calhoun	Franklin L. Pepper		
Camden	Virgil Hillyer		
Campbell	W. S. Zellars		
Carroll	John Long		
Catoosa	A. S. Fowler		
Charlton	F. M. Smith		
Chatham	C. K. Osgood		
Chatham	James Porter	Republican	
Chatham	James M. Sims	Republican	
Chattahoochee	W. A. McDougald		
Chattooga	C. O. Cleghorn		
Cherokee	N. J. Perkins		
Clarke	Madison Davis	Republican	
Clarke	Alfred Richardson	Republican	
Clay	R. A. Tumipseed		
Clayton	A. E. Cloud		
Clinch	G. Lastinger		
Columbia	J. M. Rice		
Columbia	Romulus Moore	Republican	
Coffee	J. R.Smith		
Coweta	F. M. Scroggins		
Coweta	P. Sewell		
Cobb	W. D. Anderson		
Cobb	N. N. Gober		
Colquitt	W. W. Watkins		
Crawford	W. G. Vinson		
Dade	Jas. C. Nisbet		
Dawson	Joseph L. Perkins		
Decatur	B. F. Powell		
Decatur	John Higdon		
DeKalb	W. H. Clarke		
Dooly	Hiram Williams		
Dougherty	Philip Joiner	Republican	
Dougherty	A. R. Reed		
Early	H. C. Fryer		
Echols	R. W. Phillips		
Effingham	Morgan Rawls		
Elbert	U. 0. Tate		
Emanuel	J. A. Brinson		
Fannin	Alexander Hearn		
Fayette	P. H. Brassel		
Floyd	Dunlap Scott		
Floyd	M. Ballanger		
Forsyth	H. C. Kellogg		
Franklin	James A. Harrison		
Fulton	E. M. Taliaferro		
Fulton	J. E. Gullatt		
Fulton	V. P. Sisson		
Gilmer	Jas. M. Ellis		
Glasscock	J. H. Nunn		
Glynn	R.B.Hall		
Gordon	R. A. Donaldson		
Greene	Robert L. McWhorter	Republican	Woodville
Greene	Abram Colby	Republican	
Gwinnett	Louis Nash		
Gwinnett	R. M. Parkes		
Habersham	W . S. Erwin		
Hall	David Whelchel		
Hancock	William Henry Harrison	Republican	
Hancock	Eli Barnes	Republican	
Haralson	W. N. Williams		
Hancock	W. H. Harrison		
Hart	James Allen		
Harris	W. J. Hudson		
Harris	Samuel Williams	Republican	
Heard	M. Shackleford		
Henry	J. A. Maxwell		
Houston	J. W. Mathews		
Houston	C. C. Duncan		
Houston	M. R. Felder		
Jackson	A. T. Bennett		
Jasper	Thomas M. Allen	Republican	
Jefferson	Benjamin Ayre		
Jefferson	Alexander Stone	Republican	
Johnson	J. W. Meadows		
Jones	W. T. McCullough		
Laurens	George Linder	Republican	
Lee	Samuel Lindsay		
Lee	G. Page		
Liberty	William A. Golden	Republican	
Lincoln	Piatt Madison		
Lowndes	John W. O'Neal		
Lumpkin	W. P. Price		
Macon	Robert Lumpkin	Republican	
Macon	F. H. Fyall	Republican	
Madison	J. B. Moon		
Marion	William M. Butt		
Mcintosh	Tunis Campbell	Republican	
Meriwether	P. W. Chambers		
Meriwether	W. H. F. Hall		
Monroe	W. A. Ballard		
Monroe	George H. Clower	Republican	
Miller	F. M. D. Hopkins		
Milton	G. M. Hook		
Mitchell	J. M. Burtz		
Montgomery	John J. McArthur		
Morgan	A. J. Williams		
Morgan	Monday Floyd	Republican	
Murray	J. N. Harris		
Muscogee	James G. Maull		
Muscogee	Abraham Smith	Republican	
Newton	A. H. Lee		
Newton	John F. Harden		
Oglethorpe	James W. Adkins		
Oglethorpe	James Cunningham		
Paulding	S. F. Strickland		
Pickens	S. A. Darnell		
Pierce	R. W. Carpenter		
Pike	R. A. Seale		
Polk	L. H. Walthall		
Pulaski	J. M. Buchan		
Pulaski	S. F. Saulter		
Putnam	S. C. Prudden		
Quitman	L. C. A. Warren		
Rabun	McKinzey Fincannon		
Randolph	W. M. Tumlin		
Randolph	David GofF		
Richmond	E. Tweedy		
Richmond	J. E. Bryant		
Richmond	Thomas P. Beard	Republican	
Schley	Thomas F. Rainey		
Scriven	W. D. Hamilton		
Spalding	J. T. Ellis		
Stewart	C. C. Humberand		
Stewart	J. K. Barnum		
Sumter	G. N. Harper		
Sumter	John A. Cobb		
Talbot	Marion Bethune		
Talbot	J. T. Costin	Republican	
Taliaferro	W. F. Holden		
Tatnall	Robert C. Surrency		
Taylor	Frank Wilchar		
Terrell	F. M. Harper		
Thomas	J. R. Evans		
Thomas	W. C. Carson		
Towns	George W. Johnson		
Troup	J. H. Caldwell		
Troup	J. T. McCormick		
Twiggs	Haywood Hughes		
Union	John H. Penland		
Upson	John C. Drake		
Walker	W. B. Gray		
Walton	John B. Sorrels		
Warren	John Neal		
Warren	S. G. Gardner	Republican	
Ware	Joseph D. Smith		
Washington	R. W. Flournoy		
Washington	William G. Brown		
Wayne	G. W. Rumph		
Webster	G. S. Rosser		
White	C. H. Kytle		
Whitfield	J.E.Shumate		
Wilcox	Darling Johnson		
Wilkes	Richard Bradford		
Wilkes	Edwin Belcher	Republican	
Wilkinson	C. H. Hooks		
Worth	James M. Rouse		

=== African-American members ===
This was the first time in Georgia that African-Americans, including former slaves, were voted into office in large numbers.

== Legislation ==
=== Public education ===
The House passed a bill to establish a system of public school system on August 25, 1870 on a 70-29 vote. Bills had been filed by J. E. Bryant of Richmond, J. Mason Rice of Columbia, S. A. Darnell of Pickens, James Ward Porter of Chatham and Tunis Campbell Jr of Mcintosh. It was signed into law on October 13, 1870.

== See also ==
- List of Georgia state legislatures
