= Georgia Constitutional Convention of 1867–1868 =

The 1867–1868 Georgia State Constitutional Convention was held for the purpose of constructing a constitution for the state following the end of the American Civil War. Held in Atlanta, rather than the then state capital Milledgeville, the convention started on December 9, 1867 and ran through March 1868.

Its delegates included 137 white men and 33 African American men. It was the first constitutional convention to involve the participation of African-American delegates. It created a new constitution for Georgia that included suffrage for African-American males; this was a mandate of the congressional Reconstruction Acts.

== Final draft ==
The new state constitution aimed to provide rights for African Americans and promote racial equality in the state. Its bill of rights incorporated the 14th Amendment into the state constitution, and suffrage was granted to all males over the age of 21 regardless of race. The state government also was tasked with creating a system of public education. Additionally, the governor's term of office was extended to four years, with no limit, and the practice of electing judges was ended. The document also required amendments to be approved by popular vote rather than just by the state legislature and moved the state capital to Atlanta.

== Delegates ==
Delegates to the convention were elected by district. Its members included the following:

=== First Election District ===
- M. H. Bentley
- Aaron Alpeoria Bradley
- Walter L. Clift
- A. L. Harris
- C. H. Hopkins
- W. H. D. Reynolds
- Isaac Seeley
- James Stewart

=== Second Election District ===
- Tunis G. Campbell
- William A. Goulding

=== Third Election District ===
- A. M. Moore

=== Fourth Election District ===
- F. M. Smith

=== Fifth Election District ===
- P. B. Bedford

=== Sixth Election District ===
- Levi J. Knight
- Lewis H. Roberts

=== Seventh Election District ===
- W. C. Carson
- J. L. Cutler
- M. C. Smith

=== Eighth Election District ===
- John Higden
- B. F. Powell
- Richard H. Whiteley

=== Ninth Election District ===
- H. H. Christian
- William W. Dews
- Charles C. Martin

=== Tenth Election District ===
- Philip Joiner
- John Murphy
- Benjamin Sikes
- F. O. Welch

=== Eleventh Election District ===
- Robert Alexander
- J. A. Jackson
- W. H. Noble
- John Whitaker

=== Twelfth Election District ===
- J. E. Blount
- G. W. Chatters
- Thomas Crayton

=== Thirteenth Election District) ===
- Jesse Dinkins
- J. E. Hall
- Robert Lumpkin
- H. K. McCoy
- F. Snead

=== Fourteenth Election District ===
- J. M. Buchan
- S. F. Salter
- Simeon Stanley
- J. W. Trawick

=== Fifteenth Election District ===
- A. J. Cameron

=== Sixteenth Election District ===
- E. W. Lane
- George Linder

=== Seventeenth Election District ===
- Malcolm Claiborne
- H. H. Glisson
- J. A. Madden
- J. M. Rice
- Robert Whitehead

=== Eighteenth Election District ===
- Simeon Beaird
- Foster Blodgett
- J. E. Bryant
- Rufus B. Bullock
- Benjamin Conley
- John Neal
- Alexander Stone

=== Nineteenth Election District ===
- Joseph Adkins
- D. P. Baldwin
- John W. T. Catchings
- Robert Crumbley
- Henry Strickland

=== Twentieth Election District ===
- William Henry Harrison
- Daniel Palmer
- Charles H. Prince
- C. C. Richardson
- W. C. Supple
- George Wallace

=== Twenty-first Election District ===
- Thomas Gibson
- Samuel Gove
- William Griffin
- Charles Hooks

=== Twenty-second Election District ===
- F. Wooten
- A. Bowdoin
- M. Cooper
- W. J. Howe
- M. A. Potts
- T. J. Speer
- Henry McNeal Turner
- G. G. Wilbur

=== Twenty-third Election District ===
- J. H. Anderson
- S. A. Cobb
- William P. Edwards
- Posey Maddox
- O. H. Walton

=== Twenty-fourth Election District ===
- George W. Ashburn
- J. C. Casey
- Thomas Gilbert
- Van Jones
- J. G. Maul

=== Twenty-fifth Election District ===
- T. J. Costin
- William Guilford
- E. J. Higbee
- L. L. Stanford
- Samuel Williams

=== Twenty-sixth Election District ===
- S. T. W. Minor
- W. H. Rozar
- W. H. Whitehead

=== Twenty-seventh Election District ===
- James C. Barton
- J. W. Christian
- C. D. Davis
- John Harris
- N. P. Hotchkiss

=== Twenty-eighth Election District ===
- A. G. Foster
- H. S. Glover
- J. R. Hudson
- William F. Jordan
- T. P. Saffold

=== Twenty-ninth Election District ===
- D. G. Cotting
- James Knox
- Romulus Moore
- Lewis Pope
- Josiah Sherman

=== Thirtieth Election District ===
- Amos T. Akerman
- J. Bell
- E. S. Cobb
- J. McWhorter

=== Thirty-first Election District ===
- William F. Bowers
- S. W. Crawford
- Philip Martin

=== Thirty-second Election District ===
- Milton Moore
- J. A. Woody

=== Thirty-third Election District ===
- Madison Bell
- Benjamin Dunnigan
- William L. Marler

=== Thirty-fourth Election District ===
- J. R. Bracewell
- Shadrick Brown
- S. E. Dailey
- J. Mathews
- B. D. Shumate

=== Thirty-fifth Election District ===
- Nedom L. Angier
- H. G. Cole
- James L. Dunning
- J. H. Flinn
- David Irwin
- W. C. Lee
- Homer V. M. Miller

=== Thirty-sixth Election District ===
- J. S. Bigby
- J. C. Bowden
- P. W. Chambers
- J. W. Key
- W. C. Smith

=== Thirty-seventh Election District ===
- John H. Caldwell
- A. H. Harrison
- George Harlan
- E. B. Martin
- Robert Robertson

=== Thirty-eighth Election District ===
- T. J. Foster
- R. B. Hutcherson
- J. D. Waddell

=== Thirty-ninth Election District ===
- A. W. Holcombe
- S. T. Houston
- J. G. Lott

=== Fortieth Election District ===
- John Bryson
- W. T. Crane

=== Forty-first Election District ===
- C. A. Ellington
- Wilkey McHan

=== Forty-second Election District ===
- George B. Burnett
- William A. Fort
- W. L. Goodwin
- J. R. Parrott
- Wesley Shropshire

=== Forty-third Election District ===
- S. E. Fields
- John H. King
- Leander Newton Trammell

=== Forty-fourth Election District ===
- John M. Shields
- Presley Yates

== See also ==
- Constitution of Georgia (U.S. state)
- Original 33
