= Georgia during Reconstruction =

Reconstruction occurred after the American Civil War, between 1865 and 1877, and was the reintegration of the Southern States back into the Union. Reconstruction saw federal military oversight in the Southern States, and the gradual adoption of new amendments before states could be reestablished. In Georgia, reconstruction ended around 1871 when the North's occupation of the state ended. At the end of the American Civil War, the devastation and disruption in the state of Georgia were dramatic. Wartime damage, the inability to maintain a labor force without slavery, and miserable weather had a disastrous effect on agricultural production. The state's chief cash crop, cotton, fell from a high of more than 700,000 bales in 1860 to less than 50,000 in 1865, while harvests of corn and wheat were also meager. The state government subsidized construction of numerous new railroad lines. White farmers turned to cotton as a cash crop, often using commercial fertilizers to make up for the poor soils they owned. The coastal rice plantations never recovered from the war.

Bartow County was representative of the postwar difficulties. Property destruction and the deaths of a third of the soldiers caused financial and social crises; recovery was delayed by repeated crop failures. The Freedmen's Bureau agents were unable to give blacks the help they needed.

== Wartime reconstruction, or "Forty acres and a mule" ==
At the beginning of Reconstruction, Georgia had over 460,000 freedmen. In January 1865, in Savannah, William T. Sherman issued Special Field Orders, No. 15, authorizing federal authorities to confiscate abandoned plantation lands in the Sea Islands, whose owners had fled with the advance of his army, and redistribute them to former slaves. Redistributing 400,000 acres (1,600 km^{2}) in coastal Georgia and South Carolina to 40,000 freed slaves in forty-acre plots, this order was intended to provide for the thousands of escaped slaves who had been following his army during his March to the Sea. Shortly after Sherman issued his order, Congressional leaders convinced President Lincoln to establish the Bureau of Refugees, Freedmen, and Abandoned Lands in March 1865. The Freedmen's Bureau, as it came to be called, was authorized to give legal title for 40-acre (160,000 m^{2}) plots of land to freedmen and white Southern Unionists. Rev. Tunis Campbell, a free Northern black missionary, was appointed to supervise land claims and resettlement in Georgia. Over the objections of Freedmen's Bureau chief General Oliver O. Howard, President Andrew Johnson revoked Sherman's directive in the fall of 1865, after the war had ended, returning these lands to the planters who had previously owned them, and expelling their new Black farmers.

== Presidential reconstruction ==
On Georgia's farms and plantations, wartime destruction, the inability to maintain a labor force without slavery, and miserable weather had a disastrous effect on agricultural production and the regional economy. The state's chief money crop, cotton, fell from a high of more than 700,000 bales in 1860 to less than 50,000 in 1865, while harvests of corn and wheat were also meager. After the war, new railroad lines and commercial fertilizers created conditions that spurred increased cotton production in Georgia's upcountry, but coastal rice plantations never recovered.

Many emancipated slaves flocked to towns, where they encountered overcrowding and food shortages, with significant numbers dying from epidemic diseases. The Freedmens Bureau returned much of the prewar black labor back to the field, mediating a contract-labor system between white landowners and their black workers, who often consisted of the landowners' former slaves. Taking advantage of educational opportunities available for the first time, within a year, at least 8,000 former slaves were attending schools in Georgia, established with northern philanthropy.

In mid-June 1865, Andrew Johnson appointed as provisional governor his friend and fellow Unionist, James Johnson, a Columbus lawyer who sat out the war. Delegates to a constitutional convention, meeting in Milledgeville in October, abolished slavery, repealed the Ordinance of Secession, and repudiated the Confederacy debt. The General Assembly, while alone among ex-Confederate states in refraining from enacting a harsh Black Code, assumed newly freed slaves would enjoy only the limited freedom of the prewar period's 'free persons of color,' and enacted a constitutional amendment outlawing interracial marriage. On November 15, 1865, Georgia elected a new governor, congressmen, and state legislators. Voters repudiated most Unionist candidates, electing to office many ex-Confederates, although several of these – including the new governor, former Whig Charles J. Jenkins – initially opposed secession. The new state legislature created a political firestorm in Washington by electing to the Senate Alexander Stephens and Herschel Johnson, who had been the Vice-President and a Senator of the Confederacy, respectively. Neither Stephens or Johnson, nor any of Georgia's newly-selected U.S. House delegation, were inaugurated or allowed to take their seats, as the federal government, at the time, refused to accept into the congregation persons implicated so heavily with the Confederacy's secession and rebellion, or to enable them to wield federal-level political influence.

== Congressional reconstruction ==
Andrew Johnson's decision in August 1866 to restore the former Confederate states to the Union was criticized by the Radical Republicans in Congress, who, in March 1867, passed the First Reconstruction Act, placing the South under military occupation. Georgia, along with Alabama and Florida, became part of the Third Military District, under the command of General John Pope. The Reconstruction Act was approved in February 1867 and despite President Johnson's veto, Congress overruled him and passed the act in March. After the first act was passed, a similar process would occur for the later Reconstruction Acts. Radical Republicans also passed an ironclad oath which prevented ex-Confederates from voting or holding office, replacing them with a coalition of freedmen, carpetbaggers, and scalawags, mostly former Whigs who had opposed secession.

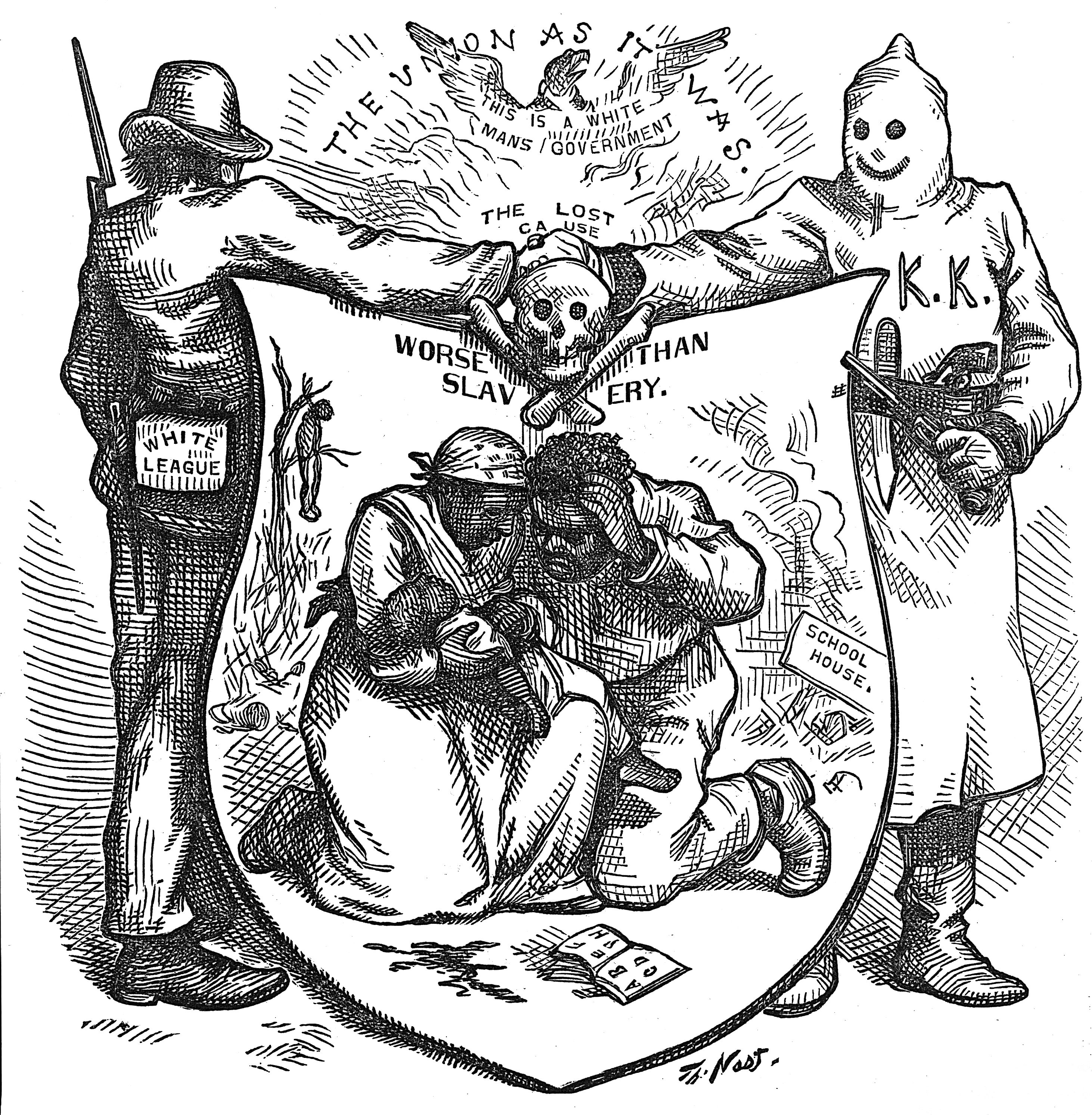
Thomas Nast political cartoon, "Worse than Slavery", depicting the subjugation of Blacks by the Ku Klux Klan and the White League. Note the lynching victim in upper left of shield.

As directed by Congress, General John Pope registered Georgia's eligible white and black voters, 95,214 and 93,457 respectively. From October 29 through November 2, 1867, elections were held for delegates to a new constitutional convention, held in Atlanta rather than the state capital of Milledgeville, to prevent the interference of the ex-Confederates. In January 1868, after Georgia's first elected governor after the end of the war, Charles Jenkins, refused to authorize state funds for the racially integrated state constitutional convention, his government was dissolved by Pope's successor General George Meade and replaced by a military governor. This counter-coup galvanized white resistance to the Reconstruction, fueling the growth of the Ku Klux Klan. Grand Wizard Nathan Bedford Forrest visited Atlanta several times in early 1868 to help set up the organization. In Georgia, the Klan was led by John Brown Gordon, a charismatic General in Lee's Army of Northern Virginia. Freedmen's Bureau agents reported 336 cases of murder or assault with intent to kill against freedmen across the state from January 1 through November 15 of 1868.

In July 1868, Georgia was readmitted to the Union, the newly elected General Assembly ratified the Fourteenth Amendment, and a Republican governor, New York native Rufus Bullock, was inaugurated. The state's Democrats—including former Confederate leaders Robert Toombs and Howell Cobb—denounced the policies of the Reconstruction in a mass rally in Atlanta, described by contemporary Issac Wheeler Avery as "the largest political mass meeting ever held in Georgia." The principal target of the rally, Joseph E. Brown, Georgia's Governor under the Confederacy, who became a Republican and a delegate to the Chicago convention that had nominated Union general Ulysses S. Grant for president, declared that although the state, reluctantly, had given Blacks the vote, as they were not citizens the state's constitution did not allow them to hold office. In September, white Republicans joined with the Democrats in expelling the Black senators and Black representatives in the lower house from the General Assembly. While Governor Bullock gave the figure of 28, the monument Expelled Because of Their Color, on the grounds of the Georgia State Capitol in Atlanta, identifies 33.

A week later, in the southwest Georgia town of Camilla, white residents attacked a black Republican rally, killing twelve people in the Camilla massacre.

These developments led to calls for Georgia's return to military rule, which increased after Georgia was one of only two ex-Confederate states to vote against Grant in the election of 1868. (Louisiana was the other; Mississippi, Texas, and Virginia did not vote because they had not yet been readmitted to the Union.) The expelled black legislators, led by Rev. Tunis Campbell and Henry McNeill Turner, lobbied in Washington for federal intervention. In March 1869 Governor Bullock, hoping to prolong Reconstruction, "engineered" Georgia's refusal to ratify the Fifteenth Amendment to the United States Constitution, which gave Black American men the right to vote. The same month the U.S. Congress once again barred Georgia's representatives from their seats, resulting in the reinstatement of military rule in December 1869. In January 1870, Gen. Alfred H. Terry, the final commanding general of the Third District, both reinstated the previously expelled Black legislators and replaced ex-Confederates within the General Assembly with the Republican runners-up. Known colloquially "Terry's Purge," these events ensured a Republican majority in the legislature, and on February 2, 1870, Georgia ratified the Fifteenth Amendment.

=== Amos T. Akerman ===
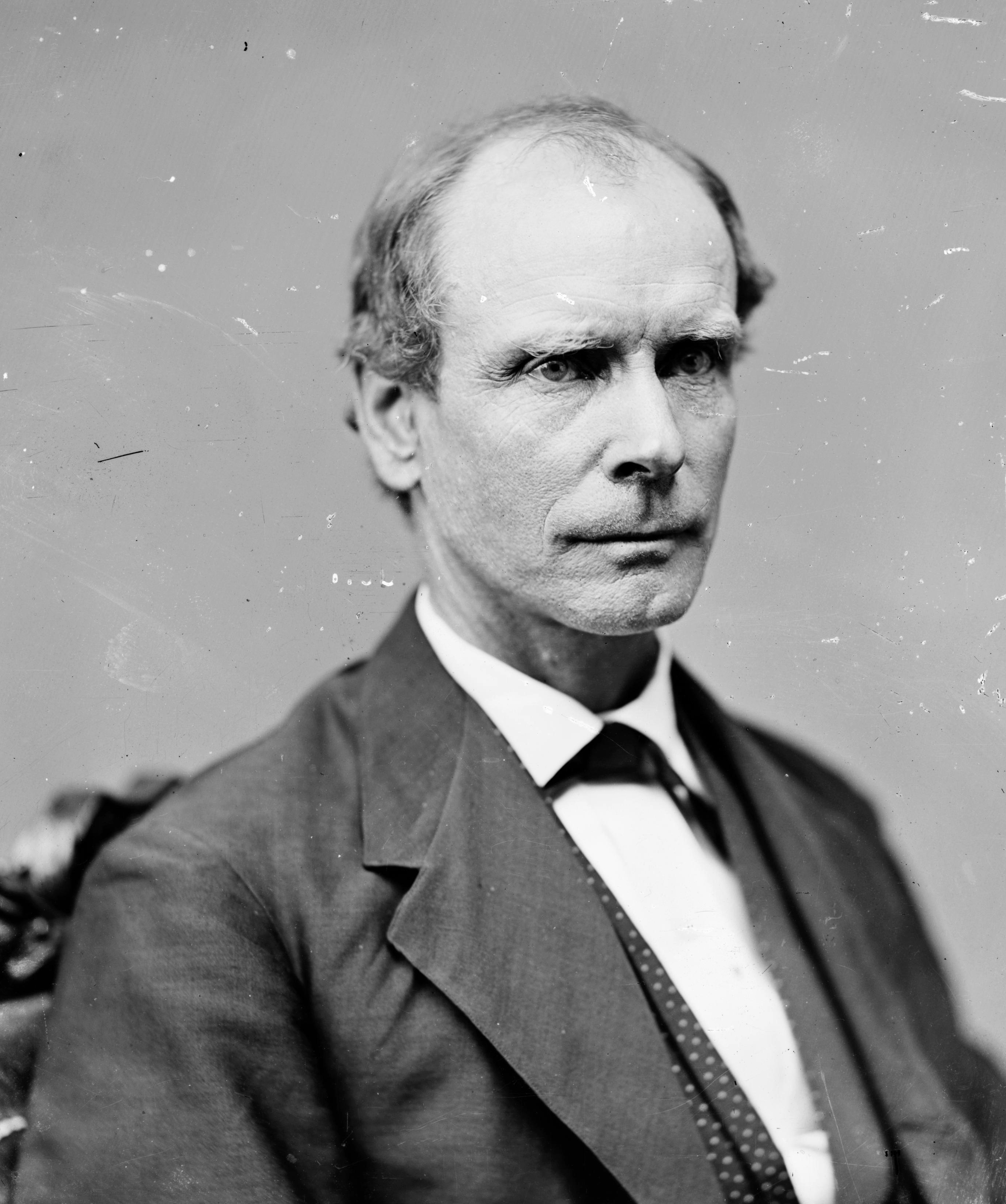
As U.S. Attorney General Amos T. Akerman set up a justice system that vigorously prosecuted the Ku Klux Klan.

During the tenure of Amos T. Akerman (1821–1880) as Attorney General of the United States from 1870 to 1871, thousands of indictments were brought against Klansmen in an effort to enforce the Civil Rights Acts of 1866 and the Enforcement Acts of 1870 and 1871. Akerman, though born in the North, moved to Georgia after college and owned slaves; he fought for the Confederacy and became a scalawag during Reconstruction, speaking out for civil rights for Blacks. As U.S. Attorney General under President Grant, he became the first ex-Confederate to reach the cabinet. Akerman was unafraid of the Klan and committed to protecting the lives and civil rights of Blacks. To bolster Akerman's investigation, President Grant sent in Secret Service agents from the Justice Department to infiltrate the Klan to gather evidence for prosecution. The investigations revealed that many whites actively participated in Klan activities. With this evidence, Grant issued a Presidential proclamation to disarm and remove the Klan's notorious white robe and hood disguises. When the Klan ignored the proclamation, Grant sent Federal troops to nine South Carolina counties to put down the violent activities of the Klan. Grant teamed Akerman up with another reformer in 1870, a native Kentuckian, the first Solicitor General Benjamin Bristow, and the duo went on to prosecute thousands of Klan members and brought a brief quiet period of two years (1870–1872) in the turbulent Reconstruction era.

==== Jefferson Franklin Long ====
In December 1870, the first African American representative of Georgia Jefferson F. Long was elected into Congress, where he served until March of the following year, 1871. Jefferson Long was elected through a special election, to finish a vacant term until a proper election could determine the next representative. According to Grace Hardwick, during Long's election and term, Georgia's Republican party pushed Blacks to run and serve in special elections while White members served full terms instead. Despite Long's term lasting a few months, he became the first Black representative to speak on the House floorm where he spoke out against the Amnesty Act of 1872 (voted on in 1871), which would lift the restrictions on former confederates participation in government. Long argued that passing the bill would put the black communities in danger of violence, or intimidation in future elections, suppressing their votes in the future. Despite his opposition, the bill would be passed nationwide. After his term, Long did not run or hold any future government position.

== Violence in the Cities ==
=== Augusta ===
In cities like Augusta, in 1865, which were occupied by members of the United States Colored Troops (USCT), the occupations would result in violence between the residents and occupants of the city. The tensions were not just between the civilians and the black troops, but also towards their commanders, leaving more Union members to be targets for violence. The occupation saw Captain Alexander Heasley, leader of the black troops stationed in the city, killed by three white men, who were former Confederate soldiers. The following trial would see only one man found guilty and serve a reduced sentence, while the others were released. After the trial, the troops stationed in the city would be moved to other cities and replaced with other members of the USCT. Tensions remained despite the new troops' arrival in the city. Incidents would occur between the troops and civilians, often without knowledge of who started them. There were times where soldiers would enter the property of civilians, and either be turned away or threatened to leave, and would return with others to intimidate civilians from threatening them. In some instances, attacks would occur, often around civilians' houses rather than the streets, frequently former Confederates would be the ones attacking Union troops. While violent skirmishes occurred, it was not often prosecuted unless the attacks were towards higher members of the army; other members attacked or killed often saw no justice. Violence was prevalent in other cities throughout Georgia, as Reconstruction continued, regardless of the soldiers' race, or the occupied city.

== End of reconstruction ==
Georgia Democrats despised the 'Carpetbagger' administration of Rufus Bullock, accusing two of his friends, Foster Blodgett, superintendent of the state's Western and Atlantic Railroad, and Hannibal I. Kimball, owner of the Atlanta opera house where the state legislature met, of embezzling state funds. His efforts to prolong military rule caused considerable divisions in the states party, while black politicians complained that they did not receive an adequate share of patronage. In February 1870 the newly constituted legislature ratified the Fifteenth Amendment and chose new Senators to send to Washington. On July 15, Georgia became the last former Confederate state readmitted into the Union. The Democrats subsequently won commanding majorities in both houses of the General Assembly. Governor Rufus Bullock fled the state in order to avoid impeachment. With the voting restrictions against former Confederates removed, Democrat and ex-Confederate Colonel James Milton Smith was elected to complete Bullock's term. By January 1872 Georgia was fully under the control of the Redeemers, the state's resurgent white conservative Democrats. They used terrorism to strengthen their rule. The expelled African American legislators were particular targets for their violence. African American legislator Abram Colby was pulled out of his home by a mob and given 100 lashes with a whip. His colleague Abram Turner was murdered. Other African American lawmakers were threatened and attacked.

== See also ==
- Bibliography of the Reconstruction era

== Notes ==
Georgia was re-admitted to the Union twice
