= Original 33 =

First group of African-American legislators in Georgia, United States

The "Original 33" were the first 33 African-American members of the Georgia General Assembly. They were elected to office in 1868, during the Reconstruction era. They were among the first African-American state legislators in the United States. Twenty-four of the members were ministers. Upon taking office, white Democrats, then a minority in the Assembly, conspired with enough white Republicans to expel the African-American legislators from the Assembly in September 1868. The next year, the Supreme Court of Georgia ruled that African Americans had the right to hold office in Georgia. The expelled legislators were reinstated and took office in January 1870.

The 33 are commemorated in the sculpture Expelled Because of Color on the grounds of the Georgia State Capitol.

== History ==
Elections in Georgia in 1868 were plagued by widespread Ku Klux Klan violence aimed at murdering or intimidating newly freed African Americans. Freedmen's Bureau officials in Georgia counted 336 cases of murder or assault with intent to kill against freedmen between January 1 and November 15. Still, 33 African Americans — 30 in the lower house, 3 in the state senate — were elected in heavily Black areas, making up about one-sixth of the 197-member legislature.

After losing votes for their preferred candidates for the U.S. Senate, the white majority conspired to remove the black and mixed-ethnicity members from the Assembly on the grounds they were ineligible to hold office under the Georgia Constitution. Most of the black delegates to the state's post-war constitutional convention voted against including into the constitution the right of black legislators to hold office, a vote which Rep. Henry McNeal Turner came to regret.

The members were expelled by September 1868. The ex-legislators petitioned the federal government and state courts to intervene. In White v. Clements (June 1869), the Supreme Court of Georgia ruled 2-1 that black people did, in fact, have a right to hold office in Georgia. In January 1870, commanding general of the District of Georgia Alfred H. Terry began "Terry's Purge", removing ex-Confederates in the General Assembly who had been elected through election violence or intimidation. He replaced them with Republican runners-up and reinstated the black legislators, resulting in a Republican majority in both houses. From that point, the General Assembly accomplished the ratification of the Fifteenth Amendment, chose new senators to go to Washington, and adopted public education.

The work of the Republican majority was short-lived, after the so-called "Redeemer" Democrats won majorities in both houses in December 1870. The Republican governor, Rufus Bullock, after trying and failing to reinstate federal military rule in Georgia, fled the state. After the Democrats took office they began to enact harsh recriminations against Republicans and African Americans, using terror, intimidation, and the Ku Klux Klan, leading to disenfranchisement by the 1890s. One quarter of the black legislators were killed, threatened, beaten, or jailed. The last African-American legislator, W. H. Rogers, resigned in 1907. Afterwards, no African American held a seat in the Georgia legislature until civil rights attorney Leroy Johnson, a Democrat, was elected to the state senate in 1962.

== List of legislators ==
At that time, each state senator in Georgia represented a single-member district made up of three contiguous counties, numbered from 1 to 44. Population was not considered when drawing state senate districts. Each state representative in Georgia represented a county, with counties having between one and three representatives depending on population.

=== Representatives ===
- Eli Barnes, Hancock County
- James Ward Porter, Chatham County
- Henry McNeal Turner, Bibb County
- William Guilford, Upson County
- William Henry Harrison, Hancock County
- Thomas M. Allen, Jasper County
- Thomas Beard, Richmond County
- Edwin Belcher, Wilkes County
- George H. Clower, Monroe County
- Abram Colby, Greene County
- Romulus Moore, Columbia County
- John T. Costin, Talbot County
- Madison Davis, Clarke County
- Monday Floyd, Morgan County
- F. H. Fyall, Macon County
- Samuel Gardner, Warren County
- William A. Golden, Liberty County
- Ulysses L. Houston, Bryan County
- James M. Simms, Chatham County
- Philip Joiner, Dougherty County
- George Linder, Laurens County
- Robert Lumpkin, Macon County
- Peter O'Neal, Baldwin County
- Alfred Richardson, Clarke County
- Alexander Stone, Jefferson County
- Abraham Smith, Muscogee County
- John Warren, Burke County
- Samuel Williams, Harris County
- Tunis Campbell Jr., McIntosh County
- Malcolm Claiborn, Burke County

=== State senators ===
- Rev. Tunis Campbell Sr., of McIntosh County, who also represented Liberty and Tattnall counties. These counties comprised District 2.
- Aaron Alpeoria Bradley, of Chatham, who also represented Bryan and Effingham counties. These counties comprised District 1.
- George Wallace, who represented Hancock, Baldwin, and Washington counties. These counties comprised District 20.

== Recognition ==
In 1976, the Original 33 were honored by the Black Caucus of the Georgia General Assembly with a statue that depicts the rise of African-American politicians. It is on the grounds of the Georgia State Capitol in Atlanta.

The "Expelled Because of Their Color" monument is located near the Capitol Avenue entrance of the Georgia State Capitol. It was dedicated to the 33 original African-American Georgia legislators who were elected during the Reconstruction period. In the first election (1868) after the Civil war, blacks were allowed to vote. But even though former slaves could now vote, there was no law that allowed black representatives to hold office. So, the 33 black men who were elected to the General Assembly were expelled. The construction of this monument was funded by the Black Caucus of the Georgia General Assembly, a group of African-American State representatives and senators who are committed to the principles and ideals of the Civil Rights Movement organized in 1975. The Georgia Legislative Black Caucus commissioned the sculpture in March 1976 (Boutwell). John Riddle, the Sculptor of this monument, was also a painter and printmaker known for artwork that acknowledged the struggles of African-Americans through history.

— Carlisa Simon

Inscribed on the base of Riddle's sculpture are the names of the 33 black pioneer legislators of the Georgia General Assembly elected and expelled in 1868 and reinstated in 1870 by an Act of Congress.

The Georgia Legislative Black Caucus continues to hold annual events honoring the Original 33.
