= John T. Riddle =

American painter and sculptor

John T. Riddle, Jr. (March 18, 1933 – March 3, 2002) was an American artist known for his paintings and sculptures. Riddle's metal assemblage sculptures, created from the debris of the Watts riots, are among his best-known works. He died March 3, 2002.

== Education ==
Riddle was born in Los Angeles, California. He received an associate degree from Los Angeles City College and a bachelor's degree in education. Riddle received a Master of Fine Arts degree in painting from California State College in Los Angeles. He taught art in high schools before moving to Atlanta in 1974 where he taught at Spelman College.

== Work ==
Riddle's work often features African Americans as subjects, and includes Expelled Because of Their Color, a sculpture commemorating the Original 33, 33 African-American members of the Georgia General Assembly who were elected in 1868 but expelled. Following the 1965 Watts riots in Los Angeles, Riddle collected metal debris after that he would then make into sculptures.

Riddle was one of the artists featured in the documentary television program Renaissance in Black: Two Artists' Lives.

The California African American Museum held a retrospective of his work in 2003.

His work is included in the permanent collections of the Museum of Contemporary Art of Georgia, the Brooklyn Museum of Art and Georgia's State Art Collection. His bronze sculpture "Expelled Because of Their Color" is on the Georgia State Capitol grounds.
