= Senator Adkins =

Senator Adkins may refer to:

- Betty Adkins (1934–2001), Minnesota State Senate
- David Adkins (Kansas politician) (born 1961), Kansas State Senate
- Joseph Adkins (1815–1869), Georgia State Senate

== See also ==
- Senator Atkins (disambiguation)
