= Camilla massacre =

1868 massacre in Georgia, United States

- Date: September 23, 1868
- Location: Camilla, Georgia
- Caused by: White peoples' anger over African Americans gaining the right to vote under the 1868 Georgia state constitution
- Goals: Suppressing voting by African Americans
- Methods: guns

Parties
African-Americans, Southern white Republican sympathizers (scalawags) (Republicans)	Sheriff's Department, Mitchell County, Georgia

Number
128-302	

Casualties and losses
9–15	None

Casualties
- Deaths: 9–15
- Injuries: 40
- Arrested: None

The Camilla massacre took place in Camilla, Georgia, on Saturday, September 19, 1868. African Americans had been given the right to vote in Georgia's 1868 state constitution, which had passed in April, and in the months that followed, whites across the state used violence to combat their newfound political strength, often through the newly founded Ku Klux Klan. Georgia agents of the Freedmen’s Bureau recorded 336 cases of murder or assault with intent to kill against freedmen from January 1 through November 15.

The massacre followed the expulsion of the Original 33 black members of the Georgia General Assembly earlier that month. Among those expelled was southwest Georgia representative Philip Joiner. On September 19, Joiner led a twenty-five-mile march of several hundred blacks (freedmen), as well as a few whites, from Albany, Georgia, to Camilla, the Mitchell County seat, to attend a Republican political rally on the courthouse square. Estimates of the number of participants range from 150 to 300.

The local sheriff and "citizens committee" in the majority-white town warned the black and white activists that they would be met with violence, and demanded that they surrender their guns, even though carrying weapons was legal and customary at the time. The marchers refused to give up their guns and continued to the courthouse square, where a group of local whites, quickly deputized by the sheriff, fired upon them. This assault forced the Republicans and freedmen to retreat into the swamps as locals gave chase, killing an estimated nine to fifteen of the black rally participants while wounding forty others. "Whites proceeded through the countryside over the next two weeks, beating and warning Negroes that they would be killed if they tried to vote in the coming election." The Camilla Massacre was the culmination of smaller acts of anti-Black violence committed by white inhabitants that had plagued southwest Georgia since the end of the Civil War.

The massacre received national publicity, prompted Congress to return Georgia to military occupation, and was a factor in the 1868 U.S. presidential election.

"The Camilla Massacre remained part of southwest Georgia's hidden past until 1998, when Camilla residents publicly acknowledged the massacre for the first time and commemorated its victims."

== See also ==
- Expelled Because of Their Color
