= Osborne Augustus Lochrane =

American judge (1829–1887)

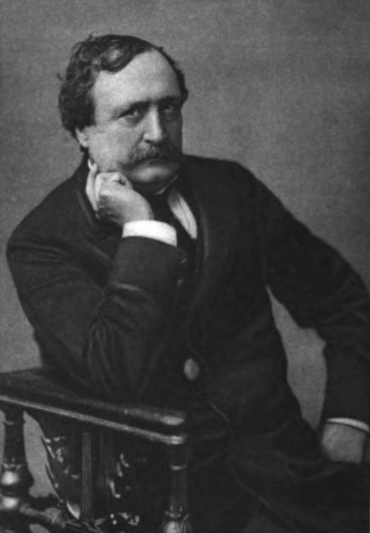

Chief Justice of the Supreme Court of Georgia
- In office 1871–1872
- Preceded by: Joseph E. Brown
- Succeeded by: Hiram B. Warner

Personal details
- Born: August 22, 1829 Midleton, Ireland
- Died: June 17, 1887 (aged 57) Atlanta, Georgia
- Resting place: Oakland Cemetery
- Spouses: Victoria Lamar; Josephine Freeman
- Children: 5
- Occupation: Jurist

Osborne Augustus Lochrane (August 22, 1829 – June 17, 1887) was chief justice of the Supreme Court of Georgia from 1871 to 1872.

== Biography ==
Osborne Augustus Lochrane was born in Midleton, Ireland on August 22, 1829. He immigrated to the United States, settling in Athens, Georgia at age 18. He read law, and was admitted to the bar in February 1850. He practiced as a lawyer in Macon and served as a circuit judge before being appointed to the Supreme Court of Georgia.

He married twice, to Victoria Lamar and Josephine Freeman, and had five children. He was noted for his oratory.

After returning to private practice, he was general counsel for the Pullman Sleeping Car Company.

He died at his home in Atlanta on June 17, 1887.

== Legacy ==
His portrait is in the collection of the Digital Library of Georgia. A biological sketch of Lochrane was included in The Green Bag. He ruled on issues of conscription during the secession era. He is buried in Oakland Cemetery in Atlanta where a tall monument marks his gravesite.

Judge Lochrane owned F. H. Fyall, a slave born to a white father and a French woman of mixed heritage who was later elected to the Georgia Assembly during the Reconstruction Era (one of the Original 33).

Political offices
Preceded by Joseph E. Brown	Chief Justice of the Supreme Court of Georgia; 1871–1872	Succeeded by Hiram B. Warner
