= John Warren (Georgia politician) =

U.S politician during the Reconstruction Era

Member of the Georgia House of Representatives from the Burke County district
- In office 1868 – ? Original 33

Personal details
- Born: Midway, Georgia
- Party: Republican

John Warren was a representative in the Georgia Assembly during the Reconstruction Era. He was African American, a Republican, and represented Burke County in the Georgia House of Representatives. In 1868, Warren was shot and injured in an attack on free black people.
