= Senator Atkins =

Senator Atkins may refer to:

- John DeWitt Clinton Atkins (1825–1908), Tennessee State Senate
- Toni Atkins (born 1962), California State Senate
- William Atkins (Louisiana politician) (born 1947), Louisiana State Senate

== See also ==
- John Atkin, Connecticut State Senate
- Senator Adkins (disambiguation)
