= James Ward Porter =

American politician

Georgia Assembly
- In office 1868–?

Personal details
- Party: Republican

James Ward Porter was elected a state representative in Georgia during the Reconstruction era, representing Chatham County. Before becoming a representative he was the owner of a tailor's shop in Savannah. This was unusual, as the laws in Georgia at the time largely prohibited Black people from owning property. He and other African Americans were expelled from the legislature.

== See also ==
- Original 33
- African American officeholders from the end of the Civil War until before 1900
