= Malcolm Claiborne =

U.S politician during the Reconstruction Era

Member of the Georgia House of Representatives from the Burke County district
- In office 1868 – 1868; Original 33

Personal details
- Born: c. 1838
- Died: July 25, 1870 (aged 31–32)
- Party: Republican

Malcolm Claiborne (c. 1838–July 25, 1870), sometimes spelled Claiborn, was an elected representative in the Georgia Legislature. An African American, he along with 25 of 29 African Americans elected in Georgia in 1868 were denied seats by their white colleagues. After federal intervention, they were allowed to take office in 1870. Claiborne was shot and killed the same year in a dispute with the messenger sent by the Georgia House, Moses H. Bentley, who had been a black delegate to the Constitutional Convention, in a heated dispute over the pay of House pages.

According to the Atlanta Historical Bulletin, Claiborne was shot and killed on Marietta Street near Forsyth Street, after a heated argument where Claiborne accused Bentley of wrongly firing a Black page and replacing him with a White page. A contemporary report from 1870 stated that Claiborne was killed in the capitol building. Bentley fired three shots at Claiborne, with one striking him in the chest, while the other shots missed. The article said the dispute was reportedly due to "opprobrious remarks" made by Claiborne towards Bentley in relation to Claiborne condemning Bentley for his actions which caused the arrest of Senator Wallace.

Claiborne is believed to be buried at the Oakland Cemetery (Atlanta), although the exact location of his grave is unknown. A bronze sculpture was placed at the Georgia state capitol to honor Claiborne and the other legislators who were expelled because of their color.
