= Hiram B. Warner =

American judge (1802–1881)

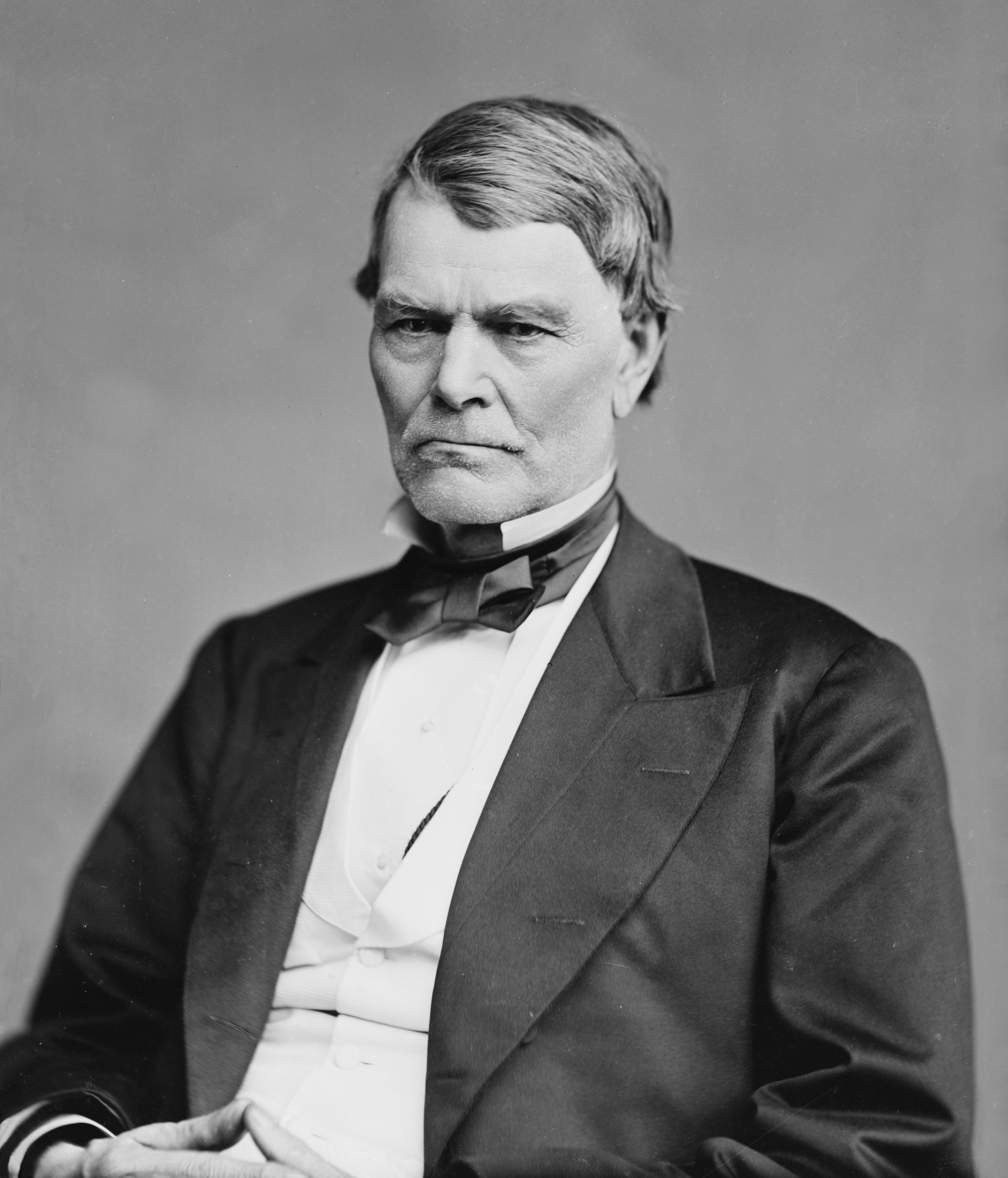

Chief Justice of the Georgia Supreme Court
- In office 1872–1880
- Preceded by: Osborne Augustus Lochrane
- Succeeded by: James Jackson
- In office 1867–1868
- Preceded by: Joseph Henry Lumpkin
- Succeeded by: Joseph E. Brown

Member of the U.S. House of Representatives from Georgia's 4th district
- In office March 4, 1855 – March 3, 1857
- Preceded by: William Dent
- Succeeded by: Lucius Jeremiah Gartrell

Member of the Georgia General Assembly
- In office 1828–1831

Personal details
- Born: October 29, 1802 Williamsburg, Massachusetts
- Died: June 30, 1881 (aged 78) Atlanta, Georgia
- Party: Democratic

Hiram B. Warner (October 29, 1802 – June 30, 1881) was an American politician, lawyer, educator and jurist from Georgia. He served on the Supreme Court of Georgia (1846–1853) and represented Georgia in the U.S. Congress (1855–1857). He was Chief Justice of the Supreme Court of Georgia on two occasions: first, from 1867 to 1868 and second, from 1872 to 1880.

Warner was born in Williamsburg, Massachusetts, in 1802. In 1819, he moved to Georgia and taught school for three years. After studying law, Warner gained admittance to the state bar and began practicing law in Knoxville, Georgia, in 1825

After serving in the Georgia General Assembly from 1828 until 1831, Warner did not seek reelection and moved to Talbotton, Georgia in 1830 and then to Greenville, Georgia at a later date. He was elected as a judge to the Georgia Superior Court and presided from 1833 to 1840. In 1846, he became a judge on the Supreme Court of Georgia and remained on that body until his resignation in 1853.

In 1854, Warner won election to the 34th United States Congress as a Democratic Representative of Georgia's 4th congressional district and served one term from March 4, 1855, to March 3, 1857. He did not run for reelection in 1856.

Georgia Governor Charles J. Jenkins appointed Warner as judge of the Coweta Circuit Court in 1865 and he remained in that position until 1867 when he was appointed as Chief Justice of the State supreme court. He was subsequently elected to that position and served in that capacity until he resigned in 1880. He died in Atlanta, Georgia, on June 30, 1881, and was buried in Town Cemetery in Greenville, Georgia.

U.S. House of Representatives
Preceded by William Dent	Member of the U.S. House of Representatives from Georgia's 4th congressional district March 4, 1855 – March 3, 1857	Succeeded by Lucius Jeremiah Gartrell
Legal offices
Preceded by Joseph Henry Lumpkin	Chief Justices of the Supreme Court of Georgia; 1867–1868	Succeeded by Joseph E. Brown
Preceded by Osborne Augustus Lochrane	Chief Justices of the Supreme Court of Georgia; 1872–1880	Succeeded by James Jackson

== See also ==
- List of signers of the Georgia Ordinance of Secession
