= Edwin Belcher =

U.S politician during the Reconstruction Era

Member of the Georgia House of Representatives from the Wilkes County, Georgia district
- In office 1868–?

Personal details
- Born: c. 1845
- Party: Republican

Military service
- Allegiance: United States
- Branch/service: United States Army

Edwin Belcher (born c. 1845) was an officer in the Union Army during the American Civil War, a Freedmen Bureau official in Monroe County, Georgia after the war, and then a state senator in the Georgia Legislature representing Wilkes County, Georgia during the Reconstruction Era.

== Military service ==
Edwin Belcher reportedly served in a white regiment and was twice taken prisoner during the Civil War. When his background was discovered he reportedly said he did his duty like any other soldier.

== Political office ==
Belcher was also appointed an assessor of revenue for Georgia's third district by U.S. President Ulysses S. Grant and was later appointed by Grant as postmaster in Macon, Georgia. After the 1868 election the legislature refused to seat African Americans. More than two dozen were turned away but Belcher and a few others were allowed to remain because they had light complexions and it could not be proved they were 1/8 or more "Negro". The others allowed to remain in their elected offices were Madison Davis of Clarke County, F. H. Fyall of Macon County and Thomas P. Beard of Richmond County.

== Law career ==
In 1872 he graduated from Howard University's law school (founded in 1869) and was admitted to the bar in Washington D.C. His brother Eugene R. Belcher was also part of one of the earliest Howard University Law School classes.

In 1878, Belcher wrote a letter introducing himself to William Lloyd Garrison. In the letter he says he was "born the slave of my father".

== Legacy ==
Drew S. Days III, former Solicitor General of the United States, is a descendant of the Belcher family.
