= Robert McWhorter =

American politician

Speaker of the Georgia House of Representatives
- In office 1868–1870
- Preceded by: Thomas Hardeman, Jr.
- Succeeded by: James Milton Smith

Member of the Georgia House of Representatives from the Greene County district
- In office 1847–1861
- In office 1868–1870

Member of the Georgia Senate from the Greene County district
- In office 1870–1884

Personal details
- Born: June 19, 1819 Oglethorpe County, Georgia, U.S.
- Died: May 20, 1908 (aged 88) Woodville, Georgia, U.S
- Party: Democratic (1847–1868; 1878–1884); Republican (1868–1878)

Military service
- Allegiance: Confederate States of America
- Branch/service: 3rd Georgia Volunteer Infantry
- Years of service: 1861–1865
- Rank: Major (CSA)
- Battles/wars: Battle of Appomattox Court House

Robert Ligon McWhorter (June 19, 1819 – May 20, 1908) was an American planter and politician who served in the Georgia House of Representatives as a Democrat from 1847 to 1861, and then switched to serving as a Republican in both houses of the Georgia General Assembly from 1868 to 1884. He was the first Republican to hold the seat of Speaker of the Georgia House.

== Early years ==
McWhorter was born in the community of Bowling Green, in Oglethorpe County, Georgia, the youngest of three sons born to Hugh McWhorter and Helena Ligon. His family owned a forty-acre homestead. After studying at Mercer University, McWhorter worked as a planter in Greene County and was elected to the Georgia House of Representatives in 1847, in which he served until the Civil War began in 1861.

== Military service ==
Upon joining the Confederate Army, McWhorter organized Company C ("Dawson Grays") of the 3rd Georgia Volunteer Infantry regiment as Captain on April 24, 1861. He was elected Major and Assistant Quartermaster of Wright's Brigade on April 28, 1862. He was present at the Confederate surrender to Union forces at Old Appomattox Court House.

== Post-war political service ==
McWhorter joined the pro-Reconstruction Republican Party, and was re-elected to his old seat in the Georgia House in 1868 under the Reconstruction Constitution. In that same election cycle, McWhorter's brother, James Hamilton McWhorter won election to the Georgia State Senate, representing neighboring Oglethorpe County. Roughly 1200 of Greene County's 1500 eligible black voters turned out to help elect two Republicans to the House. They were McWhorter and black Republican representative Abram Colby. In that same election, Ulysses S. Grant carried Greene County in the Presidential race. Representatives met in the new capital city of Atlanta, where the legislative session was held in an opera house on Marietta Street rented from H.I. Kimball. McWhorter was elected Speaker by the Republican majority. He served in that position during the entire 80th Georgia General Assembly until 1870. After McWhorter presided over the House for one term, Democrats regained the majority and replaced him with James Milton Smith as Speaker. McWhorter would later rejoin the Democratic party, in 1878, and serve in the Georgia State Senate until retiring from political life in 1884.

== Death and legacy ==
McWhorter died in Woodville, Georgia, and was buried in Woodville Cemetery. His son, Judge Hamilton McWhorter was a respected jurist. His grandson, Hamilton James McWhorter, served in the Georgia House during the 1920s and represented the 50th Senate District during the 1930s. He served as president of the Senate in 1933, before the office of Lieutenant governor was created. A great-grandson, Hamilton James McWhorter, Jr., served one term in the Georgia State Senate representing a district that included Oglethorpe County from 1961 to 1962. After that, for a period of 25 years, from 1967 to 1992, McWhorter, Jr. served as Secretary of the Georgia State Senate.

== See also ==
- List of speakers of the Georgia House of Representatives
