= Lucius J. Gartrell =

American politician (1821–1891)

Lucius Jeremiah Gartrell
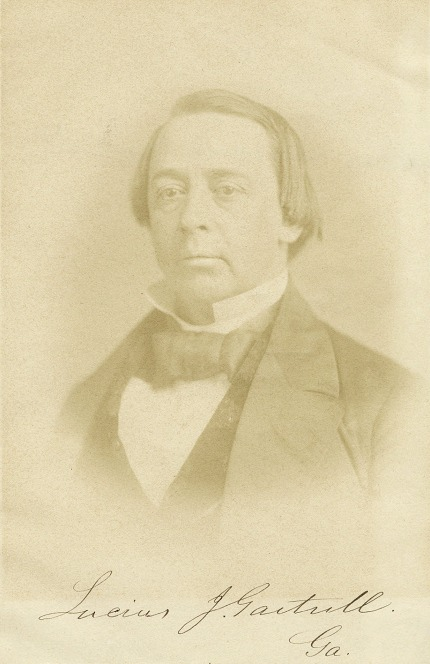
- Lucius J. Gartrell, circa 1858

Member of the U.S. House of Representatives from Georgia's 4th district
- In office March 4, 1857 – January 23, 1861

Member of the Confederate House of Representatives from Georgia's 8th District
- In office January 3, 1862 – 1864

Member of the Georgia House of Representatives
- In office 1847-1850

Personal details
- Born: January 7, 1821 Washington, Georgia
- Died: April 7, 1891 (aged 70) Atlanta, Georgia
- Resting place: Oakland Cemetery (Atlanta)

Military service
- Allegiance: Confederate States of America
- Branch/service: Confederate States Army
- Years of service: 1861-1862; 1864-1865 (CSA)
- Rank: Brigadier general
- Commands: 7th Regiment, Georgia Volunteer Infantry
- Battles/wars: American Civil War

Lucius Jeremiah Gartrell (January 7, 1821 – April 7, 1891) was an American politician, lawyer, and Confederate general during the American Civil War.

== Early life and education ==
Gartrell was born near Washington, Georgia, to Joseph Gartrell, Jr. and Eliza Boswell Gartrell. He attended Randolph-Macon College, and Franklin College (now known as the Franklin College of Arts and Sciences), the founding school of the University of Georgia in Athens. Gartrell passed the state bar in 1842 and began the practice of law in Washington.

== Public office ==
Gartrell served as the solicitor general of the northern judicial circuit from 1843 until 1847 when he was elected to the Georgia House of Representatives. He was subsequently elected to the first of two consecutive terms in U.S. House of Representatives in 1856.

== Confederate service ==
He resigned from his second term in 1861 to form the Seventh Regiment of the Georgia Volunteer Infantry in the Confederate army during the Civil War. In 1862, Gartrell was elected to the Confederate Congress and served in that capacity until 1864. In 1864, he was appointed as a brigadier general in the Confederate forces.

== Personal life ==
Gartrell married twice. First to Louisianna Olivia Gideon (1823-1854). The couple had two sons, Henry Clay Gartrell (1845-1861), and Joseph Erasmus Gartrell (1852-1886). After the death of his first wife, Gartrell married Antoinette Phoebe Burke (1834-1882). They had seven children, Lizzie Gartrell Baird (1856-1898), Vannie Gartrell Phinizy (1858-1887), Carrie Gartrell Blount (1861-1947), Lucy Gartrell Magnus (1864-1936), Ida-May Gartrell Hartridge (1866-1892), Alice Gartrell Hay (1870–1910), and Lucius Jeremiah Gartrell, Jr. (1879-1944).

== Later years ==
After the war, Gartrell served as a member of the State constitutional convention in 1877. He also ran for governor in 1882 but lost to Alexander Stephens. Gartrell died in Atlanta, Georgia, in 1891.

== See also ==
- List of American Civil War generals (Confederate)

U.S. House of Representatives
Preceded by Hiram B. Warner	Member of the U.S. House of Representatives from Georgia's 4th congressional district March 4, 1857 – January 23, 1861	Succeeded by American Civil War
