= Samuel Gardner (Georgia politician) =

U.S politician during the Reconstruction Era

Member of the Georgia House of Representatives from the Warren County district
- In office 1868 – ? Original 33

Personal details
- Party: Republican

Samuel Gardner was a representative in the Georgia Assembly during the Reconstruction Era. He was African American, a Republican, and represented Warren County, Georgia.
