= Eli Barnes =

American politician

Georgia Assembly
- In office 1868–?

Personal details
- Party: Republican

Eli Barnes was an American politician. He was a representative in the Georgia Assembly as a Republican during the Reconstruction Era. A former slave who worked as a mechanic, he was African American. He was elected in 1868 and represented Hancock County, Georgia in the 80th Georgia General Assembly. He was appointed to the Committee on Manufactures. He only served one term.

He asked for military units to protect a black school in 1869. As a result, he received threats and intimidation from members of the Ku Klux Klan.

Barnes was one of those who testified to a select committee of congress about widespread intimidation and horrific attacks in African Americans in the Southern States. He told the congressional investigating committee, "It has got to be quite a common thing. . . to hear a man say, 'They rode around my house last night, and they played the mischief there; my wife was molested, my daughter badly treated, and they played the wild generally with my family.'"

== See also ==
- William Henry Harrison (Georgia politician)
