= Abraham Smith (politician) =

U.S politician during the Reconstruction Era

Member of the Georgia House of Representatives from the Muscogee County district
- In office 1868 – ? Original 33

Personal details
- Party: Republican

Abraham Smith was a representative in the Georgia Assembly during the Reconstruction Era. He was African American, a Republican, and represented Muscogee County.

Smith was a minister and served as Vice President of the Georgia Labor Convention held in Macon in October 1869.
