= William A. Golden =

U.S politician during the Reconstruction Era

Member of the Georgia House of Representatives from the Liberty County district
- In office 1868 – ? Original 33

Personal details
- Born: Midway, Georgia
- Party: Republican

William A. Golden was a representative in the Georgia Assembly during the Reconstruction Era. He was African American, a Republican, and represented Liberty County.

Golden was born into slavery to slave parents on the plantation of R.M. Gaulden, where Dorchester Academy was later founded.
