= Monday Floyd =

U.S politician during the Reconstruction Era

Member of the Georgia House of Representatives from the Morgan County district
- In office 1868 – 1868; Original 33

Member of the Georgia House of Representatives from the Morgan County district
- In office 1870–?

Personal details
- Party: Republican

Monday Floyd was a carpenter and Republican State Representative, who was elected to two terms in the Georgia House of Representatives during the Reconstruction Era. As one of several emancipated African Americans who were elected to public office, Floyd faced considerable resistance. He received a threatening note from the Ku Klux Klan promising that there would be no more "Negro" legislators in Georgia, and requesting him to leave town.

Elected in 1868, he was among the 25 of 29 African American legislators in Georgia who were blocked from taking office. After federal intervention he was able to be seated after the 1870 election. In December 1870 he was threatened and shot, while in his home in Madison, Georgia, by the Ku Klux Klan. Three days later the Klan returned and Floyd fled to Atlanta.

He testified before the U.S. Congress in 1871 on the threats he had received.
