= John H. Anderson (Florida politician) =

Florida state legislator in 1887

John H. Anderson was an American state legislator in Florida. He represented Duval County, Florida in the Florida House of Representatives in 1887. His post office was in Jacksonville.

== See also ==
- Reconstruction era
- African American officeholders from the end of the Civil War until before 1900
