= Romulus Moore =

U.S politician during the Reconstruction Era

Member of the Georgia House of Representatives from the Columbia County district
- In office 1868–1868

Member of the Georgia House of Representatives from the McDuffie County district
- In office 1870–?

Personal details
- Born: January 1818 Taliaferro County, Georgia, US
- Died: Unknown
- Party: Republican
- Spouse: Mary Elenor Horton

Reverend Romulus Moore (January 1818 – before 1888) was an American politician and leader of the early civil rights movement after the American Civil War during the Reconstruction Era in the U.S. state of Georgia. An African American, Moore was elected to the state legislature in 1868. Moore was expelled from the legislature in 1868 along with other African Americans (Original 33) and reinstated in the Georgia General Assembly in 1870 by an Act of Congress. Reverend Moore was active in advocating the 15th Amendment to the United States Constitution.

== Biography ==
=== Childhood and call to the ministry ===
The Rev. Romulus Moore was born a slave in Taliaferro County, Georgia, in January 1818. He was reared in the family of James Moore (white) and educated with Moore's children. Through his education, the Rev. Moore purchased his own freedom.

The future Reverend Moore was a wild young man until 1860, when he met and married a Miss Mary Elenor Horton, a Christian woman. Once married, he changed his ways. In 1862, he was converted and joined the First Baptist Church of Thomson, Georgia, a predominantly white church. Upon conversion, Moore began preaching.

Moore's wife's employer, Mrs. Thomas Hamilton, heard him preach and she was so struck his gift that she asked her pastor to license Romulus Moore to the ministry. In 1867, he was ordained to the ministry by the Rev. Henry Johnson of Augusta, Georgia, and accepted the pastorate of the Poplar Head Baptist Church in Dearing, Georgia.

=== Public service and Reconstruction ===
In 1868, the Rev. Moore was elected as one of the first African-American legislators to the Georgia State Assembly in Atlanta. At this time, Thomson was in Columbia County. It was not until 1870 that McDuffie County was created from Columbia and Warren Counties. The Rev. Moore relocated to Atlanta as a Representative of Columbia County. While in Atlanta, he was associated with the Mt. Pleasant Baptist Church, now the Wheat Street Baptist Church, and its pastor, the Rev. Andrew Jackson.

The Rev. Moore's legacy as one of the first African-American men elected during the Reconstruction Era and as a member of the Georgia Constitutional Committee makes him among the founding fathers of the Civil rights movement (1865–1896). He is listed with several Georgia legislators in the United States Congressional Record of February 3, 1874 as having petitioned the U.S. Congress to ratify the Civil Rights Act of 1875.

Moore's Constitutional Committee went on to request that the United States Supreme Court uphold the 15th amendment, and the Rev. Moore is listed with Alonzo Ransier in upholding the constitutionality of the Civil Rights Act of 1875.

In the record of the 100 Year Centennial Celebration of the First African Baptist Church, the Reverend E.G. Dwelle of Augusta listed Romulus Moore as a pioneer of the civil rights movement. The Rev. Moore is listed among the leaders of the African Baptist Church that started the Augusta Institute, which became Morehouse College; the Spelman Institute, which became Spelman College; and Atlanta University.

=== Honors ===
In 1976, Romulus Moore was honored by the Black Caucus of the Georgia General Assembly with a statue that depicts the rise of African-American politicians, Expelled Because of Their Color. It is on display at the Georgia Capitol in Atlanta.

The "Expelled Because of Their Color" monument is located near the Capitol Avenue entrance of the Georgia State Capitol. It was dedicated to the 33 original African-American Georgia legislators who were elected during the Reconstruction period.In the first election (1868) after the Civil War, blacks were allowed to vote. But even though former slaves could now vote, there was no law that allowed black representatives to hold office. So, the 33 black men who were elected to the General Assembly were expelled.

The construction of this monument was funded by the Black Caucus of the Georgia General Assembly, a group of African-American State representatives and senators who are committed to the principles and ideals of the Civil Rights Movement organized in 1975. The Georgia Legislative Black Caucus commissioned the sculpture in March 1976 (Boutwell). John Riddle, the Sculptor of this monument, was also a painter and printmaker known for artwork that acknowledged the struggles of African-Americans through history."

— Carlisa Simon

>

Inscribed on the base of Riddle's sculpture are the names of the 33 pioneer legislators of the Georgia General Assembly elected and expelled in 1868 and reinstated 1870 in the Georgia General Assembly by an Act of Congress.

The 30 African-Americans serving in the Georgia House of Representatives and the counties that elected them:

Thomas M. Allen (Jasper)	Thomas P. Beard (Richmond)	Eli Barnes (Hancock)	Edwin Blecher (Wilkes)
Tunis Gulic Campbell Jr. (McIntosh)	Malcomb Claiborn (Burke)	George H. Clower (Monroe)	Abram Colby (Greene)
John T. Costin (Talbot)	Madison Davis (Clarke)	Monday Floyd (Morgan)	F.H. Fyall (Macon)
Samuel Gardner (Warren)	William A. Golden (Liberty)	William A. Guilford (Upson)	William H. Harrison (Hancock)
Ulysses L. Houston (Bryan)	Philip Joiner (Dougherty)	George Linder (Laurens)	George Linder (Laurens)
Robert Lumpkin (Macon)	Romulus Moore (Columbia)	Peter O'Neal (Baldwin)	James Porter (Chatham)
Alfred Richardson (Clarke)	James Simms (Chatham)	Abraham Smith (Muscogee)	Alexander Stone (Jefferson)
Henry McNeil Turner (Bibb)	John Warren (Burke)	Samuel Williams (Harris)	

The three African-Americans serving in the Georgia state House of Representatives:

Aaron Alpeoria Bradley (Chatham)	Tunis G. Campbell Sr. (McIntosh)	George Wallace (Baldwin)
