= Joseph E. Brown =

American politician (1821–1894)

Joseph Emerson Brown
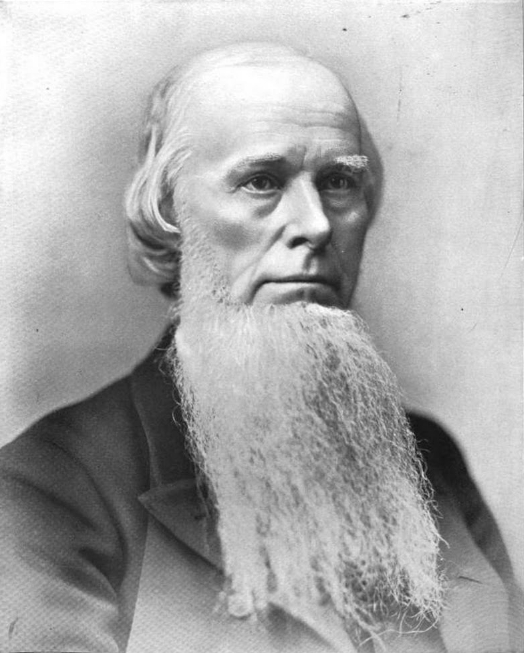

United States Senator from Georgia
- In office May 26, 1880 – March 3, 1891
- Preceded by: John B. Gordon
- Succeeded by: John B. Gordon

Chief Justice of the Georgia Supreme Court
- In office 1868–1870
- Preceded by: Hiram B. Warner
- Succeeded by: Osborne Augustus Lochrane

42nd Governor of Georgia
- In office November 6, 1857 – June 17, 1865
- Preceded by: Herschel Johnson
- Succeeded by: James Johnson

Personal details
- Born: April 15, 1821 Pickens, South Carolina, U.S.
- Died: November 30, 1894 (aged 73) Atlanta, Georgia, U.S.
- Party: Whig, Democratic, Republican
- Spouse: Elizabeth Grisham
- Children: Joseph Mackey Brown
- Education: Yale University
- Profession: Lawyer, politician

Joseph Emerson Brown (April 15, 1821 – November 30, 1894), often referred to as Joe Brown, was an American attorney and politician, serving as the 42nd governor of Georgia from 1857 to 1865, the only governor to serve four terms. He also served as a United States Senator from that state from 1880 to 1891.

A staunch Democrat, and a firm believer in slavery and Southern states' rights, Brown was a leading secessionist in 1861, and led his state into the Confederacy. Yet he also defied the Confederate government's wartime policies: he resisted the military draft, believing that local troops should be used only for the defense of Georgia; and denounced Confederate President Jefferson Davis as an incipient tyrant, challenging Confederate impressment of animals and goods to supply the troops, and slaves to work in military encampments and on the lines. Several other governors followed his lead.

After the American Civil War, Brown joined the Republican Party for a time, and was appointed as chief justice of the Supreme Court of Georgia from 1865 to 1870. Later he rejoined the Democrats, became president of the Western and Atlantic Railroad and began to amass great wealth; he was estimated to be a millionaire by 1880. He benefited from using convicts leased from state, county and local governments in his coal mining operations in Dade County. His Dade Coal Company bought other coal and iron companies, and by 1889 was known as the Georgia Mining, Manufacturing and Investment Company. Finally, he was twice elected by the state legislature as a U.S. Senator, serving from 1880 to 1891. During this time he was part of the Bourbon Triumvirate, alongside fellow prominent Georgia politicians John Brown Gordon and Alfred H. Colquitt.

Brown saved the Southern Baptist Theological Seminary financially in the 1870s. An endowed chair in his honor, the Joseph Emerson Brown Chair of Christian Theology, was established at the institution. In 2020, the endowed chair was vacated because of Brown's position on slavery and use of the convict leasing system.

== Early life and education ==
Joseph Emerson Brown was born on April 15, 1821, in Pickens County, South Carolina, to Mackey Brown and Sally (Rice) Brown. At a young age he moved with his family to Union County, Georgia. In 1840, he decided to leave the farm and seek an education. With the help of his younger brother James and their father's plow horse, Brown drove a yoke of oxen on a 125-mile trek to an academy near Anderson, South Carolina. There Brown traded the oxen for eight months' board and lodging.

In 1844, Brown moved to Canton, Georgia, where he served as headmaster of the town's academy. During this time, Brown boarded in the home of local businessman and Baptist minister John W. Lewis. Brown paid for his room and board by tutoring the Lewis children. A friendship developed between the men, and Lewis loaned Brown money to continue his legal education.

Brown went to Yale University to study law, then returned to Canton to practice. In 1847 he opened a law office in the county seat, and began to make the connections on which he built his fortune. He married Elizabeth Grisham, daughter of a major land developer. They had several children together.

Brown joined the Democratic Party and was soon elected to the Georgia state senate in 1849 from the developing Etowah River valley. He rapidly rose as a leader in the party. He was elected as state circuit court judge in 1855. He was a presidential elector in 1856.

== Governor of Georgia ==
=== First term ===
In 1857, at the young age of 36, Brown was elected governor of the state. He supported free public education for poor white children, believing that it was key to development of the state. He asked the state legislature to divert a portion of profits from the state-owned railroad, the Western & Atlantic, to help fund the schools. Most planters did not support public education and paid for private tutors and academies for their children. The Western and Atlantic Railroad was mismanaged, and unable to produce the income Brown required to fund his public education proposal. In 1858, Governor Brown appointed John W. Lewis, his landlord and benefactor from Brown's early days in Canton, to the position of Superintendent of the state-owned railroad. Lewis was a successful businessman, and immediately undertook reforms to turn around the failing enterprise. The railroad, said to be in "dire financial straits", required the same strict economic controls Lewis had practiced in his private businesses. In the three years that Lewis ran the railroad, he was able to turn the business into a money-making enterprise, paying $400,000 per year into the state treasury.

=== Second term ===
Brown easily won re-election in 1859 when he defeated a young Warren Akin Sr. (who was just beginning his political career) by a margin of 60%-40%.

Brown was a slave owner; in 1850, he owned five slaves. By 1860 when he was governor, he owned a total of 19 slaves and several farms in Cherokee County, Georgia.

Brown became a strong supporter of secession from the United States after Abraham Lincoln's election and South Carolina's secession in 1860. He feared that Lincoln would abolish slavery. Considering it the basis of the South's lucrative plantation economy, he called upon Georgians to oppose the efforts to end slavery:

What will be the result to the institution of slavery, which will follow submission to the inauguration and administration of Mr. Lincoln as the President ... it will be the total abolition of slavery ... I do not doubt, therefore, that submission to the administration of Mr. Lincoln will result in the final abolition of slavery. If we fail to resist now, we will never again have the strength to resist.

— Joseph E. Brown, December 7, 1860, emphasis added.

Once the Confederacy was established, Brown, a states' rights advocate, spoke out against expansion of the Confederate central government's powers. He denounced President Jefferson Davis in particular. Brown tried to stop Colonel Francis Bartow from taking Georgia troops "out of the state" to the First Battle of Bull Run (Manassas). He objected most strenuously to military conscription by the Confederate government in Richmond, protested the army's impressment of goods and slave labor, and was critical of Confederate tax and blockade-running policies. In time, other Confederate governors followed Brown's example, undermining the war effort and sapping the Confederacy of vital resources.

=== Third term ===
In 1861, Brown was up for re-election to a third term. It was at this time, during the re-election campaign, that Western & Atlantic Railroad Superintendent John Wood Lewis, an old friend of the governor, decided to resign from the railroad. The timing could not have been worse. Fearing that Lewis' resignation would be interpreted negatively, the governor requested that Lewis keep the resignation a secret; but the resignation letter was leaked to the press, causing a rift between the two old friends. Brown wrote to Lewis, saying: "I did not deserve this at your hands, and I confess I felt it keenly...I do not attribute improper motives, but only say the coincidence was an unfortunate one for me". The two friends eventually smoothed over the incident, and Governor Brown was subsequently re-elected. On April 7, 1862, months after Lewis left the railroad, Governor Brown appointed Lewis to a vacant seat in the Confederate Senate in the 1st Confederate States Congress, 1862–1863. Robert Toombs, former Confederate States Secretary of State, had created the vacancy when he declined his election at the Congress's opening session on February 18.

Governor Brown blocked the draft of W&A employees by mustering them into the Georgia militia. He wrote Davis: "the military operations of the Government cannot be carried on without the use of all our railroads, and the same necessity exists for the exemption of all other railroad officers and workmen." No satisfactory solution of the pressing manpower problems of the Confederacy was ever found. Skilled mechanics and engineers were conscripted, leaving the W&A with insufficient maintenance crews.

== Capture of Milledgeville - the state capital ==
In 1864, after the fall of Atlanta, Union General William Tecumseh Sherman began his March to the Sea. On the route from Atlanta to Savannah the left wing of Sherman's army entered the city of Milledgeville, then Georgia's state capital. As U.S. troops closed in on the city, and with the fall of the capital imminent, Governor Brown ordered Quartermaster General Ira Roe Foster to remove the state records. The task proved to be difficult, as it was undertaken in the midst of chaos.

WAR BETWEEN THE STATES - 1864

Gov. Brown, thinking first of the valuable and perishable State property, ordered Gen. Ira Foster, Georgia's quartermaster general (who was always prompt and efficient), to secure its removal. Some of the books and other similar property were stored in the Lunatic Asylum, three miles out of town. A train of cars was held at the depot to carry off other State property, and Gen. Foster made herculean efforts to carry out the Governor's orders, but, such was the general terror and the rush to leave town, it was next to impossible to procure labor.

When the Governor saw the condition of affairs, he went to the penitentiary, had the convicts drawn up in a line, and made them a short speech; he appealed to their patriotic pride and offered pardon to each one who would help remove the State property and then enlist for the defense of Georgia. They responded promptly, were put under the command of Gen. Foster, and did valuable service in loading the train. When that was done each one was given a suit of gray, and a gun, and they were formed into a military company of which one of their number was captain. They were ordered to report for duty to Gen. Wayne, who was commanding a small battalion of militia at Milledgeville and also the Georgia cadets from the Military Institute at Marietta.

— FRANCES LETCHER MITCHELL.

After the loss of Atlanta, Brown withdrew the state's militia from the Confederate forces to harvest crops for the state and the army. When Union troops under Sherman overran much of Georgia in 1864, Brown called for an end to the war.

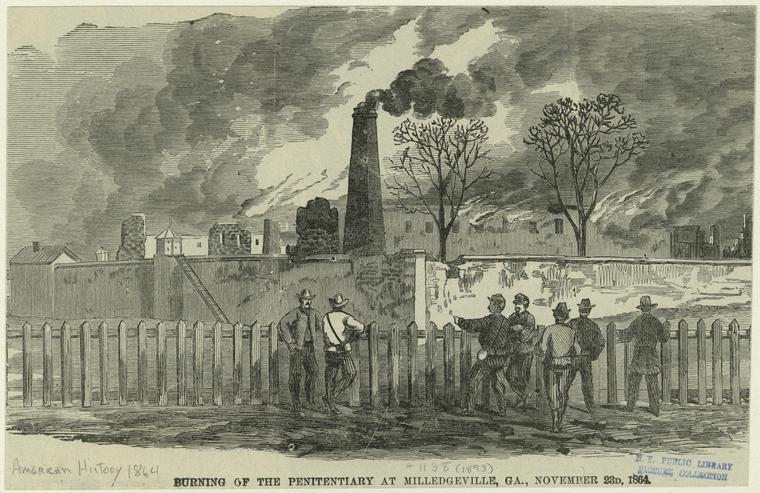
Burning of the penitentiary at Milledgeville, GA by the Union Army (November 23, 1864)

== Post-war imprisonment to Republican judgeship ==
After the war, Brown was briefly held as a prisoner in Washington, D.C. He supported President Andrew Johnson's Reconstruction policies, joining the Republican Party for a time.

Brown was a delegate to the 1868 Republican National Convention. As a Republican, Brown was appointed as chief justice of the Supreme Court of Georgia, serving from 1868 to 1870.

=== Rejoining the Democratic Party ===
Brown resigned as judge when offered the presidency of the Western and Atlantic Railroad. In this role, Brown opposed efforts by a committee to revise the state constitution to establish uniform rates for freight over the multiple railroad lines in the state.

After Reconstruction ended, Brown rejoined the Democratic Party. He was elected to the U.S. Senate in 1880 by the state legislature, as was custom by the US constitution and state laws of the time. Soon after his election to the Senate, Brown became the first Democratic Party official in Georgia to support public education for all white children. The Republican Reconstruction-era legislature was the first to establish public education in the state but the succeeding post-Reconstruction, white-dominated legislature abandoned it. Brown recommended that railroad fees be used to support it financially. Prior to this, only the elite who could afford tutors or private academies had their children formally educated.

== Later political service and business career ==
Brown was first elected to the United States Senate by the state legislature in 1880, taking office on May 26, 1880. He was re-elected in 1885, and retired in 1891 due to poor health.

While Brown's political supporters claimed that he "came to Atlanta on foot with less than a dollar in his pocket after the war and ... made himself all that he is by honest and laborious methods", most of his enterprises stemmed from his political connections. He amassed a fortune, in part through the use of convicts leased from state, county and local government in his coal mining operations in Dade County. His use of leased convict labor began in 1874 and continued until his death in 1894, a period that coincided with "the high tide of the convict lease system in Georgia".

The convict lease system was first authorized during the period of Reconstruction, under military governor and Union general Thomas H. Ruger, who issued the first convict lease in April 1868. It was expanded during the post-Reconstruction era, when the Democratic-dominated state legislature passed new laws criminalizing a range of behavior. State prisoners who were unable to pay fines, levied as part of their conviction, faced the possibility of being leased out by the state, as convict labor.

In 1880 Brown, whose fortune was estimated conservatively at one million dollars, netted $98,000 (~$2.73 million in 2024) from the Dade Coal Company. By 1886, Dade Coal was a parent company, owning Walker Iron and Coal, Rising Fawn Iron, Chattanooga Iron, and Rogers Railroad and Ore Banks, and leasing Castle Rock Coal Company. An 1889 reorganization resulted in the formation of the Georgia Mining, Manufacturing and Investment Company. This rested largely on a foundation of convict labor. The system has been likened by journalist Douglas A. Blackmon to "slavery by another name," in his book by that title.

A legislative committee visited Brown's mines during the same year that Brown sold them. They reported that the convict laborers were "in the very worst condition ... actually being starved and have not sufficient clothing ... treated with great cruelty." Of particular note to the visiting officials was that the mine claimed to have replaced whipping with the water cure torture—in which water was poured into the nostrils and lungs of the prisoners—because it allowed miners to "go to work right away" after punishment. However, it was not established if these practices were in place at the time that Brown sold the mine, or were instituted by the mine's new owner Joel Hurt.

== Death and legacy ==
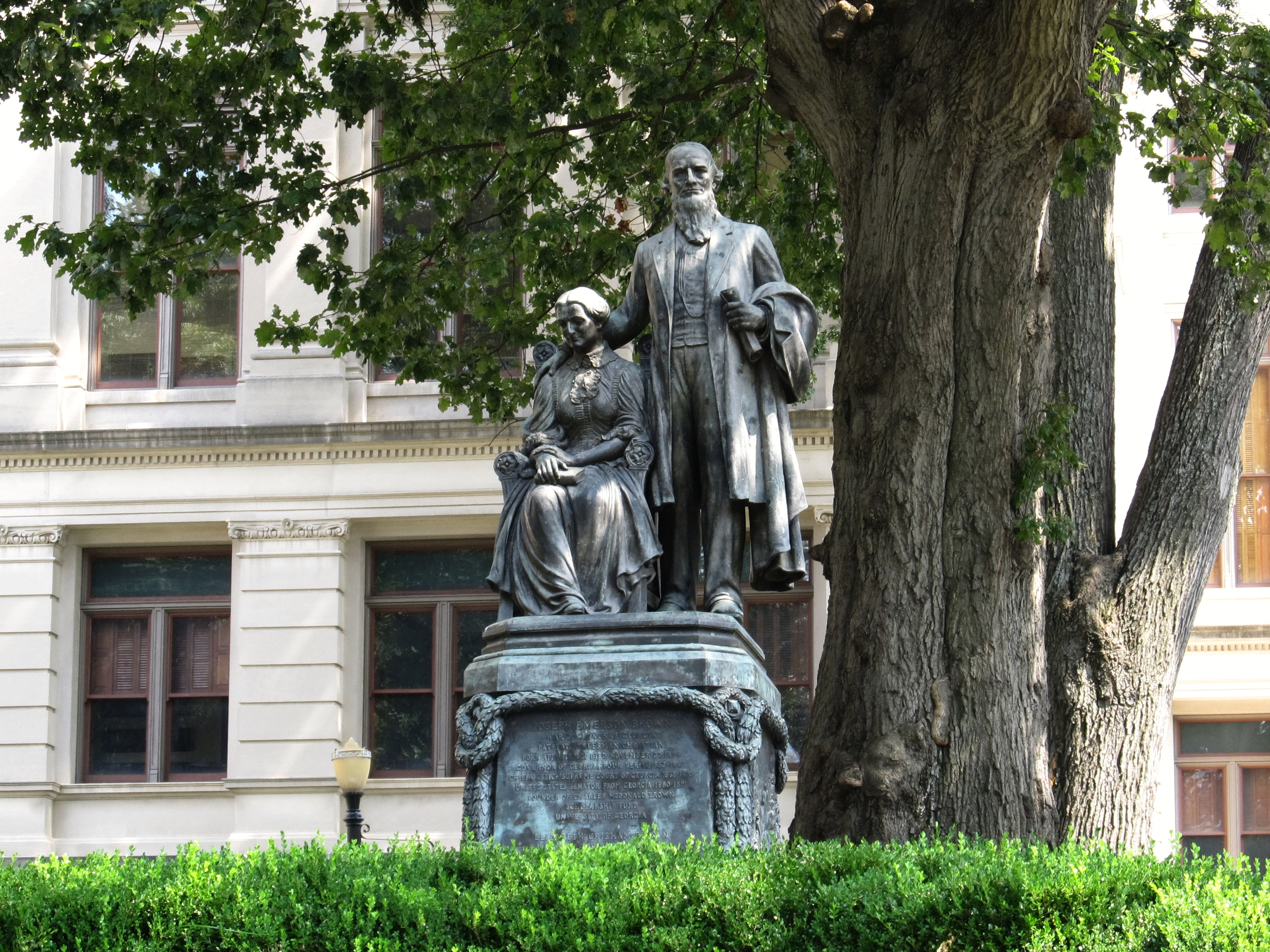
Statue of Elizabeth and Joseph E. Brown

Joe Brown's legacy is marked by his staunch support of Georgia’s autonomy, and attempts to limit Georgian troops’ deployment outside the state. He resisted the Confederate draft when it diverted soldiers to campaign, He held strongly opposite to Davis's military conscription and the centralized government, which had a detrimental effect on the Confederate future war effort. Simultaneously, the president's contentious relationship with Georgia Governor hindered General Johnston's access to a sufficient militia force, thereby complicating his defense of Georgia. Furthermore, President Davis's protracted disagreement with General Johnston impeded effective cooperation as the Federal army advanced toward Atlanta. Ultimately, President Davis's lack of trust in General Johnston led to the appointment of John Bell Hood to command one of Johnston's corps, with instructions for Hood to keep the administration informed of Johnston's operational conduct. This arrangement inadvertently resulted in Hood undermining Johnston in an attempt to secure command of the army for himself.

Joseph E. Brown died on November 30, 1894, in Atlanta, Georgia. He was honored by lying in state in the state capitol.

His tombstone is in Oakland Cemetery. In 1928, a memorial statue of Brown and his wife was installed on the grounds of the State Capitol.

His son, Joseph Mackey Brown, would also become governor of Georgia (twice).

Joseph E. Brown Hall on the campus of the University of Georgia in Athens is named in his honor. The building was completed in 1932.

Joseph Emerson Brown Park in Marietta, Georgia is named for him.

Emerson, Georgia, referencing the governor's middle name, is named in his honor.

== In fiction ==
In her novel Gone with the Wind, Margaret Mitchell made reference to Governor Brown, and the reception that "Joe Brown's Pets" received during General Sherman's march through Georgia in 1864. Brown had tried to keep Georgia troops in the state for local defense. Mitchell wrote:

Yes, Governor Brown's darlings are likely to smell powder at last, and I imagine most of them will be much surprised. Certainly they never expected to see action. The Governor as good as promised them they wouldn't. Well, that's a good joke on them. They thought they had bomb proofs because the Governor stood up to even Jeff Davis and refused to send them to Virginia. Said they were needed for the defense of their state. Who'd have ever thought the war would come to their own back yard and they'd really have to defend their state?

== See also ==
- American Civil War
- Ira Roe Foster- Confederate Quartermaster General of Georgia

== Works cited ==
- Abbott, Richard (1986). The Republican Party and the South, 1855-1877: The First Southern Strategy. University of North Carolina Press. ISBN 0807816809.

== Bibliography ==
- Blackmon, Douglas A. Slavery by Another Name: The Re-Enslavement of Black Americans from the Civil War to World War II. New York : Doubleday, 2008. ISBN 978-0385506250
- Fielder, Herbert. A sketch of the life and times and speeches of Joseph E. Brown. Springfield, Mass.: Springfield Printing Company, 1883.
- Hill, Louise Biles. Joseph E. Brown and the Confederacy. Westport, Conn: Greenwood Press 1972. ISBN 978-0-8371-5722-1
- Lichtenstein, Alex. Twice the Work of Free Labor: The Political Economy of Convict Labor in the New South. New York: Verso, 1996. ISBN 978-1859840863
- Mancini, Matthew J. One Dies, Get Another: Convict Leasing in the American South, 1866-1928. Columbia: University of South Carolina Press, 1996. ISBN 978-1570030833
- Parks, Joseph Howard. Joseph E. Brown of Georgia. Southern biography series. Baton Rouge: Louisiana State University Press 1977. ISBN 978-0-8071-0189-6
- Roberts, Derrell C. Joseph E. Brown and the politics of Reconstruction. Southern historical publications, no. 16. University: University of Alabama Press 1973. ISBN 978-0-8173-5222-6
- Scaife, William R., and William Harris Bragg. Joe Brown's pets: the Georgia Militia, 1861-1865. Macon, Ga: Mercer University Press 2004. ISBN 978-0-86554-883-1
- Wright, G. Richard and Kenneth H. Wheeler, "New Men in the Old South: Joseph E. Brown and his Associates in Georgia's Etowah Valley," Georgia Historical Quarterly 93:4 (Winter, 2009)

Party political offices
Preceded by Herschel Vespasian Johnson	Democratic nominee for Governor of Georgia; 1857, 1859	Vacant Title next held by John Brown Gordon
Political offices
Preceded by Herschel Vespasian Johnson	Governor of Georgia; 1857–1865	Succeeded by James Johnson
Legal offices
Preceded by Hiram B. Warner	Chief Justice of the Supreme Court of Georgia; 1868–1870	Succeeded by Osborne Augustus Lochrane
U.S. Senate
Preceded by John B. Gordon	U.S. senator (Class 3) from Georgia; 1880–1891; Served alongside: Benjamin H. Hill, Middleton P. Barrow, Alfred H. Colquitt	Succeeded by John B. Gordon
