= Josiah Sherman =

American politician

Josiah Sherman was an American state senator in the state of Georgia during the Reconstruction era. He was from Vermont. He sat in the 80th Georgia General Assembly from 1869 to 1870. Emma Spaulding Bryant (wife of John Emory Bryant) boarded with Sherman and his wife on the outskirts of Atlanta.

Sherman testified to a congressional subcommittee on violence, intimidation and abuse that Republicans and Republican Party organizers experienced in Georgia.
