= Aaron Alpeoria Bradley =

African-American lawyer and politician (1815–1881)

Georgia Senate

Personal details
- Born: South Carolina
- Died: 1881
- Party: Republican

Aaron Alpeoria Bradley (c. 1815–1881) was a lawyer and civil rights activist in the United States. He was born into slavery, escaped, and became a lawyer in Massachusetts in 1856. After the American Civil War he moved to Georgia. During the Reconstruction Era he was denied admittance to the Georgia Bar, but became a political activist and worked as a lawyer from South Carolina In 1865 he was arrested for his political activism. He was elected as a representative to Georgia's Constitutional Convention of 1867. He was a critic of segregation, police brutality, and capitalism. He advocated for equal rights. He spoke out against "bankers, millionaires, merchants, aristocratic mulattoes, [and] copperheaded Yankees".

Bradley never divulged his age but speculation suggests he was born around 1815. He was born on a large plantation in South Carolina and was of mixed ethnicity. He escaped to Boston in the 1830s, became one of the first black lawyers in the U.S., and was among the very few African Americans admitted to the bar before the Civil War. Others include Robert Morris (lawyer) in Massachusetts, 1847; George Boyer Vashon in New York, 1848; and John Mercer Langston in Ohio, 1854.

A skilled attorney, Bradley also operated a shoe store in Augusta, Georgia, for a short time.

== Early career ==
In 1856 Bradley became the third African American admitted to the Massachusetts Bar. He moved to Savannah, Georgia, in 1865. In 1867 he applied for admission in United States District Court in Georgia. Due to the anti-black socio-political culture of the time, as well as Bradley's confrontational activism against racial injustice, he was denied admission. Judge John Ersking cited that the basis for Bradley's rejection was that he was not grounded in the “first principles” of law, and lacked “moral and mental qualifications.”

Despite many efforts to gain admittance, Bradley was never allowed to legally practice law in this jurisdiction. But he was defiant, and practiced law in Georgia without a license until 1875. He eventually moved to Beaufort, South Carolina, where he continued to practice law and serve his Georgia clients.

== Controversy and radical advocacy ==
Aaron Bradley was a contributor to what birthed the first Black Power Movement. He advocated for “self-determination and self-sufficiency, advancing black interests and values”. He became an important leader and fought for the rights of African Americans, demanding reparations of land and cash from Whites after emancipation from the Civil War. He taught other African Americans to not sign unfavorable labor contracts with whites; these actions made him one of “the most arrested politicians in all of the nineteenth-century American history. Bradley was not afraid to stand out and always wore “flashy, fancy clothing, and usually donned a beaver-skinned hat and white kid gloves”.

He garnered enemies and was expelled from the Georgia Constitutional Convention. He returned to Savannah, Georgia, and was not greeted properly at the New Street Baptist Church. As a leader of the Lincoln Council of the Union League in Chatham City, he established a new government and decided to run for senatorship. He soon became nominated and promised that if he was elected rent would not have to be paid. He rallied and tried to gain as much support as he could. Soon after, he won the election against his opponent Rufus E. Lester. After he won the election, he was very intent to see his fellow African Americans “given their proper shares and positions”.

As Bradley took office in the Senate, his enemies never stopped trying to remove him from office. They found that Bradley had been convicted of seduction in a Brooklyn court in 1851. He was sentenced to imprisonment for two years, and his enemies found someone who was in New York during that time to testify against him to prove that it was true. Because of this, Bradley was ineligible for office. However, they found many loopholes to the testimony and “seduction was not a felony either in New York or Georgia”. Bradley was again eligible for a seat. However, due to the pressure, he resigned shrewdly on August 10 so that the seat wouldn't be passed to his opponent. It seemed like a difficult journey for Bradley because there were so many people against him, including the newspapers. Through many oppositions, Bradley was resilient and decided to take it one more step and run for Congress.

Soon after his arrival in Savannah, Georgia, in 1865, Bradley began to openly criticize the treatment of blacks during slavery, and demanded reparations to the year of enslavement. He was a vocal critic of social injustices, including police brutality, as reflected in this quote from a speech he gave at New Street Baptist Church in Savannah: "The reign of police clubs and police authority would be abolished,” and a blow would be struck “which would stun even the policemen." He also organized protests about General William Tecumseh Sherman's Special Field Orders No. 15. This ultimately resulted in the government bringing criminal sedition charges against him.

Bradley fought against segregation with a petition in Federal Court requesting an injunction of operations against the Baltimore City Passenger Railway. The railway company had a policy of forcing blacks to stand on an uncovered platform outside of the covered portion of the railway car. After the original petitioners withdrew their complaints, Bradley filed an amended petition against the railway company alleging “that the street car company refused to let him ride in violation of his privileges and immunities under Article IV, took private property without compensation, and maintained a common nuisance in violation of privileges granted from the government for use of its highways without regard to color or race."

== Black Liberation ==
‌Bradley was an assertive political orator who believed in the freedom of the Black race. He was accredited for the beginning of radical ideals that would not properly flourish until long after his death. The Black Power Movement is dated to begin during the 1960s, yet many of Bradley's demonstrations and policies called for the liberation and escalation of the negro population. Another prominent ideal of his comes to the demise of capitalism and to those it benefits. His ideals predate the Populist movement by nearly fifty years. Bradley continues to criticize capitalism through his career. Considering his taunt arrogance and aggressiveness, many whites hated Bradley, yet he was able to "banded together with poor whites over issues like the Homestead Acts, labor reform, and ending imprisonment for debt.” These systems not only effect black people in masses, but highly effected poor whites as well considering they did not have financial mobility to escape these systems.

Bradley was famously known for his pro-violence and offensive approach in making change. Very uniquely in history, he “Led riots against white citizens and police.” His policies were radical and fairly progressive for his time. He expressed that Black individuals should hold office in districts where they are the majority population. Much to the help of Bradley, and other Black activists, Black individuals were able to hold offices in the county until the late 1870s. This was possible due to the rural black population of Chatham. However, they were unable to hold office in Savannah due to being the minority population. He gained the support of the Black citizens with his pro-violence attacks, belief in women’s suffrage, to end convict leasing, and incorporate Blacks into the state militia.

Bradley was very famous within the newspapers during his time for his role in politics. It is recorded that Bradley was very confrontational with white citizens and police. According to the Georgia Weekly Telegraph and Georgia Journal & Messenger, “The whites in Savannah were but 11,000 – but the blacks 14,000 and if they got to fighting, at every corner of the streets the whites would meet another black with hatchets in their hands.” This was Bradley’s pro-violence response to the Chairman when Georgia was denied the right to assess the polls. Bradley threatened that “servant girls would burn the beds of white daughters and wives and their fathers and husbands would stop fighting to find them.” By targeting the weakest part of the family dynamic it was a for-sure way to ensure that they are not met with resistance. Bradley’s fearlessness could have been explained by his countless arrests, which were also publicized in the local newspapers.

== Social initiatives ==
Bradley was not afraid to challenge the status quo; "seeing himself as a champion of all blacks’ causes, he cast his interests broadly, establishing loose contacts with black churches and soon opening a school. He began agitating for black suffrage, joining forces with the vote campaign.... He accused the city police and the mayor's court of discrimination toward blacks [and] charged the Savannah Freedmen's Bureau Court with similar irregularities and requested inauguration of appeal procedures, offering his services as judge...."

His name is listed on the historical marker the "Original 33", a plaque listing the first 33 African-American members of the Georgia General Assembly who were elected to office in 1868.

== See also ==
- Civil rights movement (1865–1896)
