= George Linder (politician) =

U.S politician during the Reconstruction Era

Member of the Georgia House of Representatives from the Laurens County district
- In office 1868 – 1868; Original 33

Personal details
- Party: Republican

George Linder was a reverend and state representative in Georgia. He was elected to represent Laurens County in the Georgia House of Representatives during the Reconstruction era but was expelled along with the other elected African Americans. He and other African Americans were expelled. He was documented as a farmworker.

He founded the Strawberry AME Church in 1857.

== See also ==
- Original 33
