= Thomas Crayton =

American minister legislator

Thomas Crayton was an American minister and state legislator in Georgia. He served in the Georgia Senate. He was expelled. He had been enslaved. Henry McNeal Turner appointed him to head a church in Lumpkin. He was a Republican. His life was threatened. He was born in Georgia. He represented Stewart County, Georgia.

He was a delegate to the Georgia Constitutional Convention of 1867–1868.
