= Peter O'Neal =

U.S politician during the Reconstruction Era

Member of the Georgia House of Representatives from the Baldwin County district
- In office 1868 – ? Original 33

Personal details
- Born: 1813
- Died: unknown
- Party: Republican

Peter O'Neal (1813 – unknown) was a representative in the Georgia Assembly during the Reconstruction Era. He was African American, a Republican, and represented Baldwin Countyin the Georgia House of Representatives. O'Neal was born around 1813. On May 28, 1887, O’Neal and his family were preparing to move to Macon when their home was set on fire.
