= George W. Ashburn =

American assassinated politician (1814–1868)

George Washington Ashburn
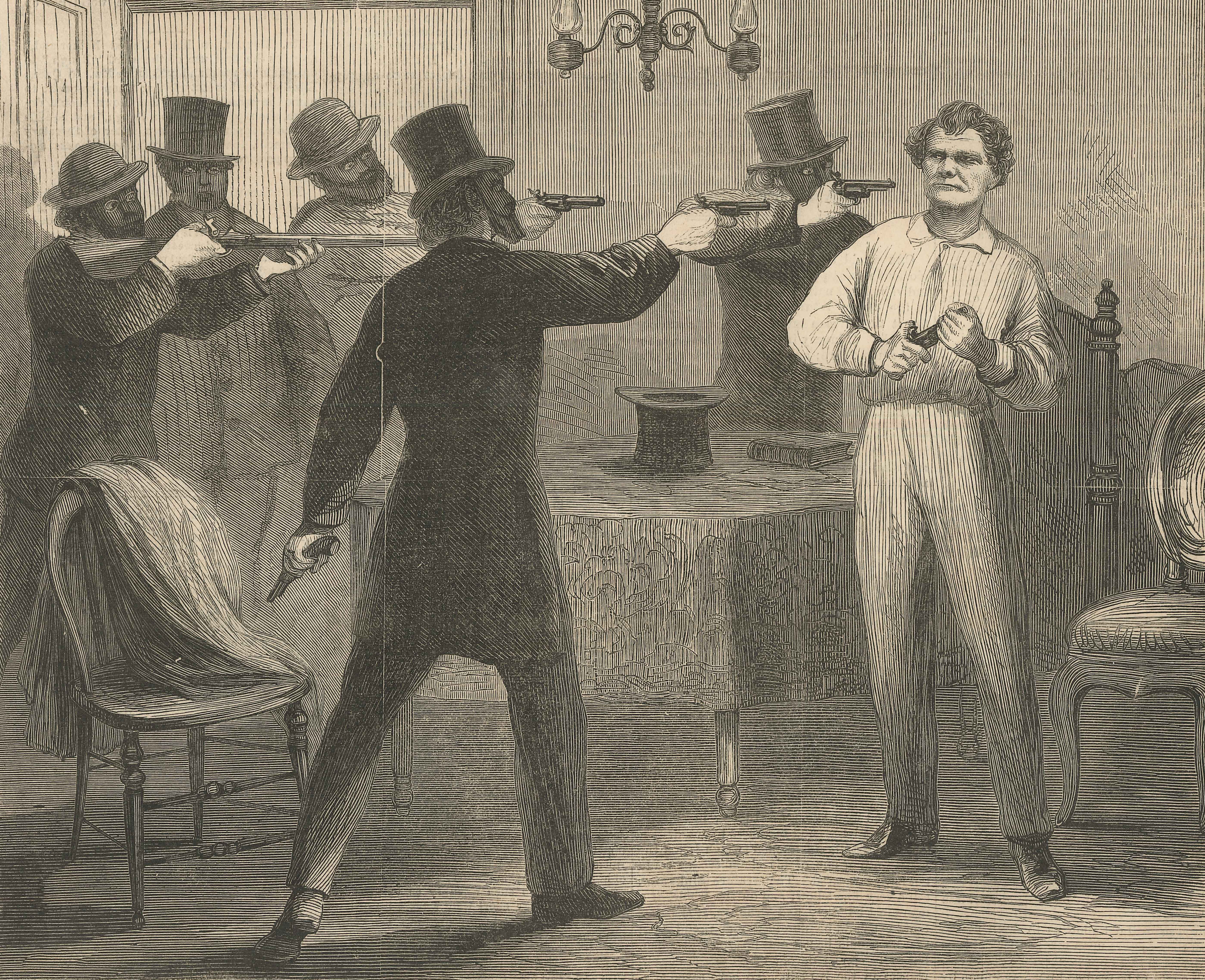
- Ashburn's assassination depicted in an 1868 illustration

Personal details
- Born: 13 April 1814 North Carolina, U.S.
- Died: 31 March 1868 (aged 53) Columbus, Georgia, U.S.
- Party: Republican
- Occupation: Union army colonel, judge

Military service
- Allegiance: United States
- Branch/service: Union Army
- Years of service: 1861-1865
- Rank: Colonel
- Battles/wars: American Civil War

George Washington Ashburn (April 13, 1814 – March 31, 1868) was a Republican US Senate candidate and judge assassinated by the Ku Klux Klan in Columbus, Georgia, for his pro-African-American actions. He was the first murder victim of the Klan in the state.

== Early life ==
Ashburn was born in North Carolina on 13 April 1814. He moved to Georgia around 1830. He married Georgia Ryley in 1843. They had one daughter.

He opposed the Secession of Georgia. During the American Civil War, he was commissioned a Colonel in the Union Army.

After President Abraham Lincoln was assassinated in April 1865, Ashburn wrote a letter to Andrew Johnson stating "the hand of God is in the assassination" on the grounds that Lincoln was not properly prepared to punish ex-Confederates for their deeds.

== Postwar ==
At the end of the war, Ashburn returned to Columbus, Georgia, and was appointed a judge by the military Governor, George G. Meade. In this capacity he worked to remove the political disabilities of all disenfranchised Georgians. Ashburn called to order the Georgia Constitutional Convention of 1867–1868, held in Atlanta, which also aimed at removing the restrictions placed on African Americans after the end of slavery. Ashburn was the author of the provisions in the new Constitution that assured civil rights to blacks. At the convention, Ashburn suggested that the new Constitution should be implemented even if the people of Georgia did not concur.

Considered a scalawag by his white Columbus neighbors, he worked with the Freedmens Bureau and alongside African American leaders such as Henry McNeal Turner. His actions quickly created several enemies across the South. Ashburn lived amongst the African American population and garnered attention from the Ku Klux Klan, which established their Columbus chapter on March 21, 1868, after a visit from Nathan Bedford Forrest.

== Assassination ==
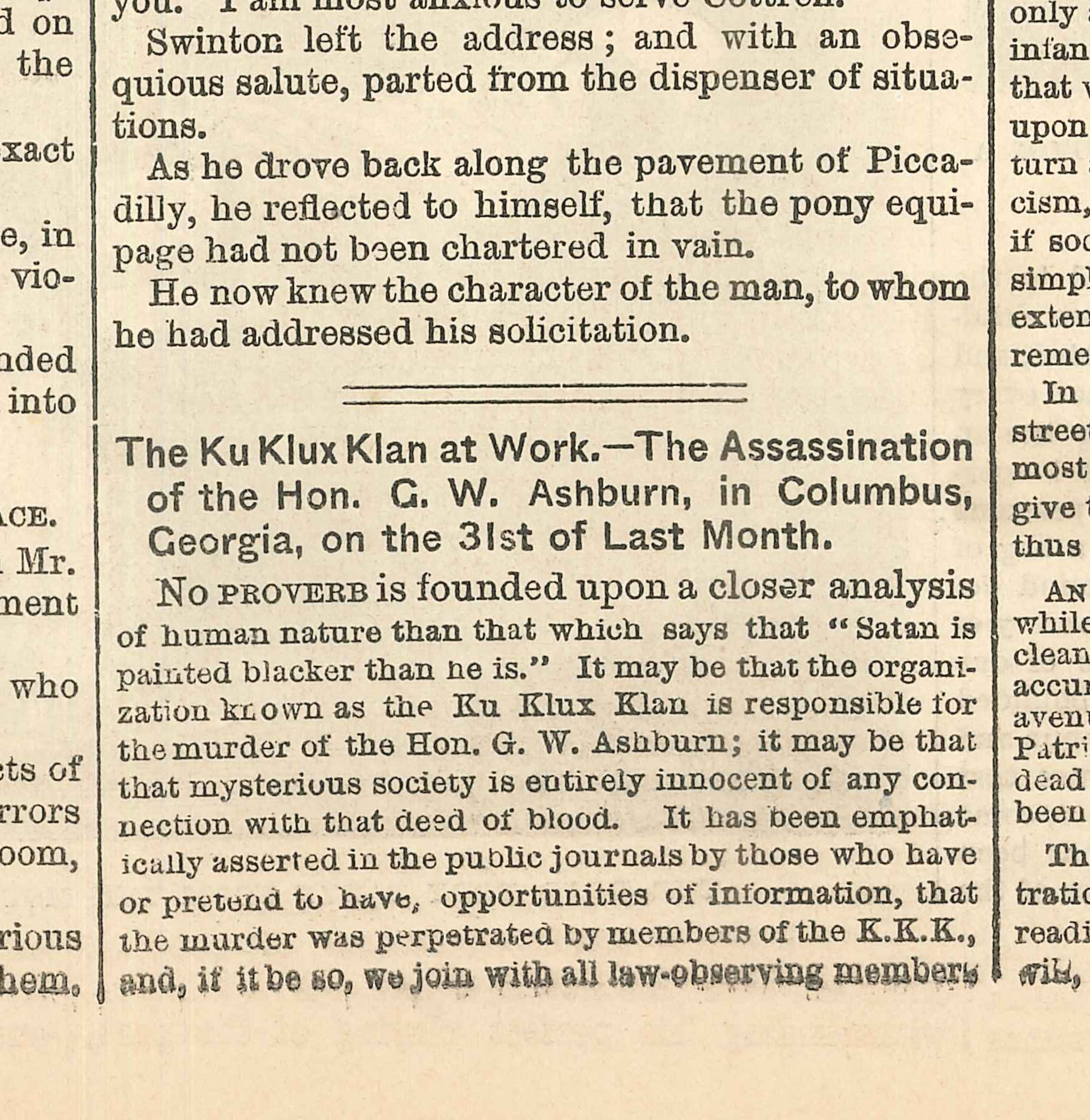

"In 1868, Ashburn assembled an organization to support his election to the U.S. Senate after Georgia has been readmitted to the Union." On the night of March 30, 1868, Ashburn participated at a huge gathering of blacks and Republicans at Temperance Hall in Columbus, Georgia. One of the featured speakers was Henry McNeal Turner. Just after midnight, Ashburn was murdered at a house on the corner of 13th Avenue and 2st Street by a group of five well-dressed men wearing masks.

== Political exoneration ==
During the time of Ashburn's murder, Georgia was still under the military governorship of General George Meade (the victor of Gettysburg), of the Third Military District. As soon as he heard of the murder, Meade implemented martial law in Columbus, removing the mayor from office, and ordering the immediate arrest of all suspects. The trial, beginning on June 29, gained national attention as over twenty persons were arrested and held at Fort McPherson. The prisoners consisted mostly of prominent white residents of Columbus. General Henry L. Benning and former Confederate Vice President Alexander Stephens agreed to represent the accused.

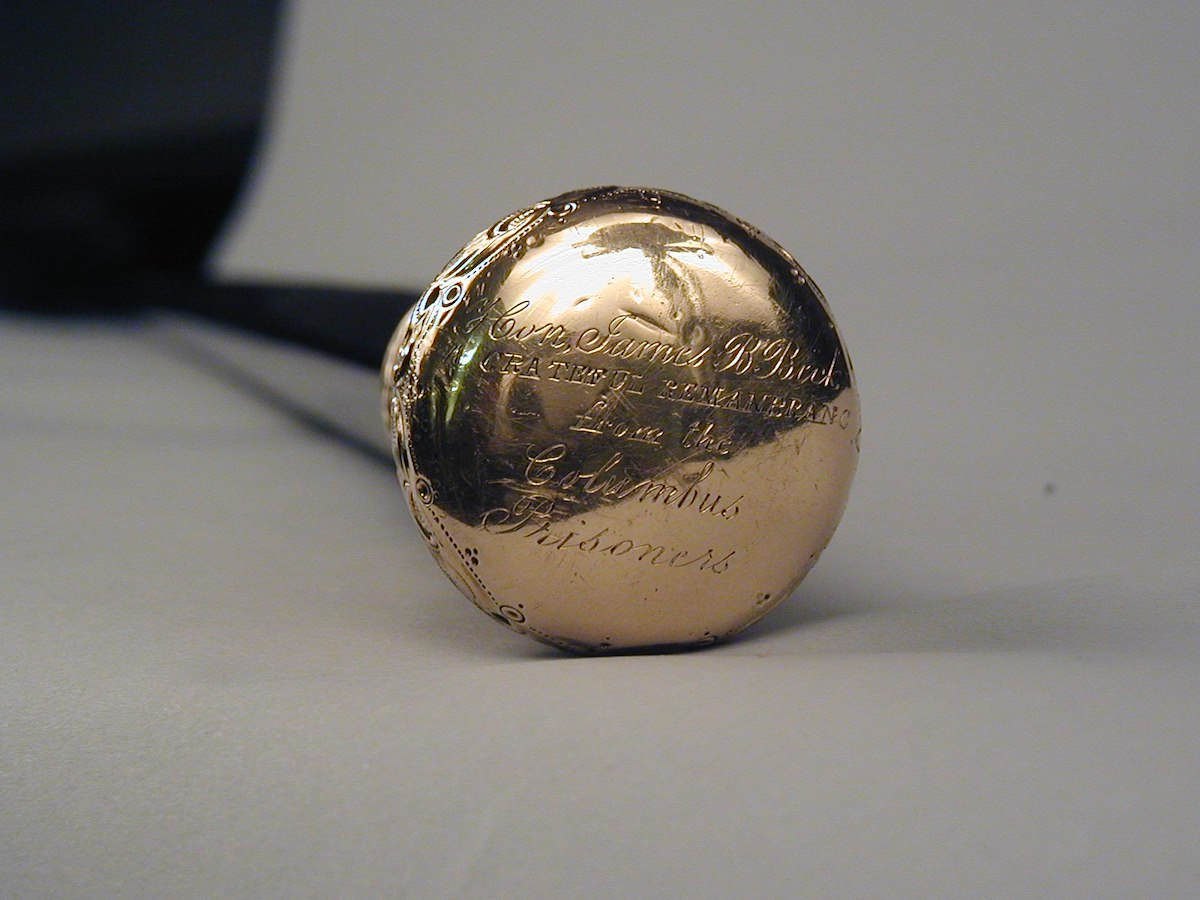
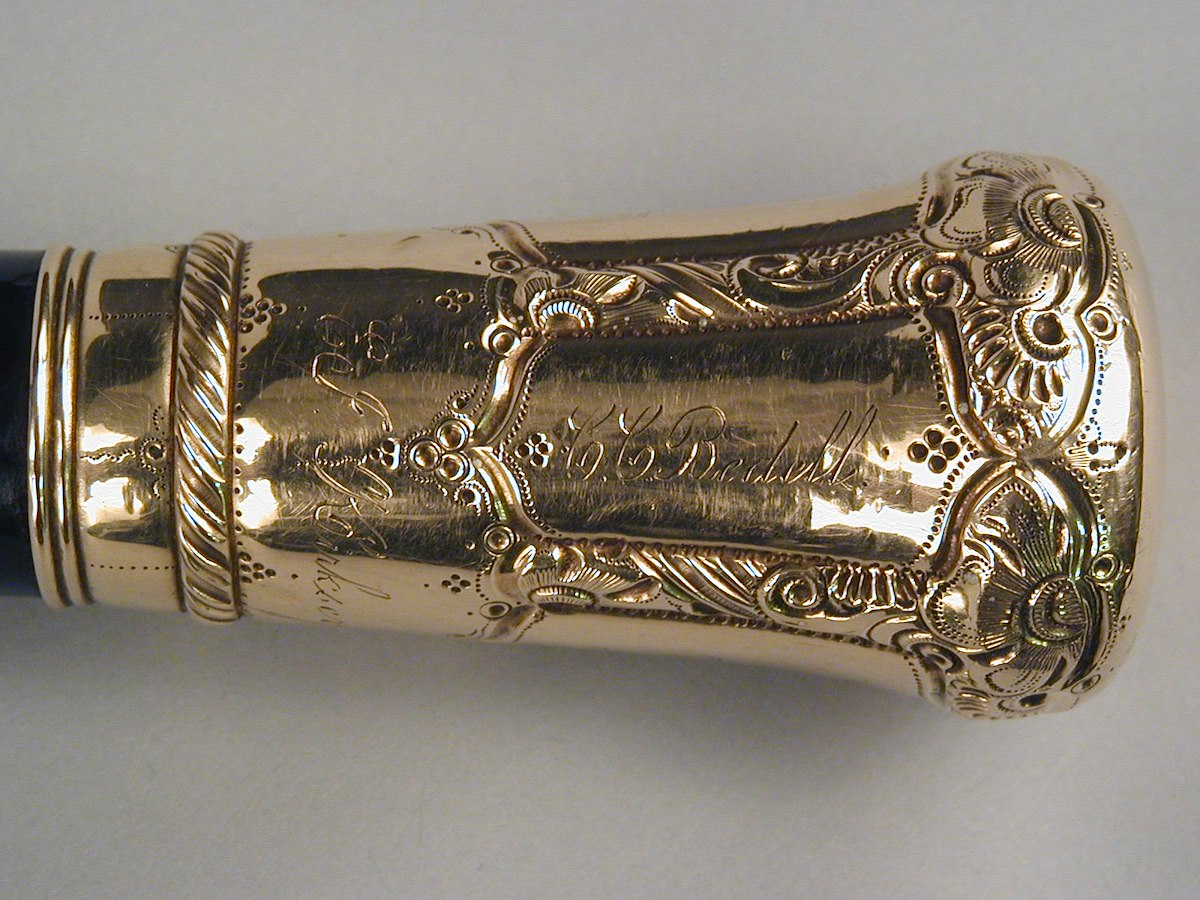
James Beck's cane, the Kentucky Congressman who assisted the killers in obtaining better conditions in the Columbus Jail.

The Federal government was pushing for Georgia to ratify the Fourteenth Amendment, while the Democrat controlled Georgia legislature was resisting it. The defenders of the Klan saw an opportunity for a bargain. On July 21, as the trial progressed, Georgia agreed to ratify the 14th Amendment in exchange for General Meade's termination of the prosecution of the murderers. All prisoners made bail and returned to Columbus. No one was ever prosecuted.

== National attention ==
Newspapers across the United States covered the assassination and subsequent trial. The pro-Klan forces in the South capitalized upon the events, publishing a full-length book on the trial titled Radical Rule: Military Outrage in Georgia.

== See also ==
- Reconstruction Era
- Battle of Columbus (1865)
- Carpetbagger
