= F. H. Fyall =

Georgia state politician in the Reconstruction Era

Member of the Georgia House of Representatives from the Macon County district
- In office 1868 – ? Original 33

Personal details
- Party: Republican

F. H. Fyall was a state Representative in the U.S. state of Georgia during the Reconstruction era. He was one of the Original 33 African Americans elected as legislators in Georgia.

He was owned as a slave earlier in his life. His eligibility to hold elected office in Georgia and that of three other elected representatives debated by the legislature when it kicked out 25 African-Americans deemed ineligible to serve. He represented Macon.

Before the American Civil War he was owned by Osborne Augustus Lochrane.
