= Philip Joiner =

U.S politician during the Reconstruction Era

Member of the Georgia House of Representatives from the Dougherty County district
- In office 1868 – 1868; Original 33

Member of the Georgia House of Representatives from the Dougherty County district
- In office 1870–?

Personal details
- Party: Republican

Philip Joiner was a delegate to the 1867 constitutional convention in Georgia and an elected representative to the Georgia Assembly in 1868. He and other African Americans were prohibited from taking office by their colleagues in the Georgia Assembly. Federal intervention in 1870 overruled the discriminatory exclusion, and Joiner would win re-election to a second term in office.

A month after being barred from taking office he was a leader of a march from Albany, Georgia to Camilla, Georgia. Participants were shot at and attacked at the Republican campaign rally in Camilla, including by the sheriff. Joiner submitted his testimony on the event to the Freedmen Bureau's O.H. Howard. Many were killed and wounded in the attack on freedmen. It was commemorated 100 years after it happened as the Camilla massacre.
