= Joseph Adkins =

American politician (1815–1869)

Member of the Georgia State Senate from the 19th district
- In office July 4, 1868 – May 10, 1869
- Preceded by: F. P. Brown
- Succeeded by: Columbus Heard

Personal details
- Born: February 5, 1815
- Died: May 10, 1869 (aged 54)
- Manner of death: Assassination by gunshot
- Party: Republican

Joseph Adkins (February 5, 1815 – May 10, 1869) was a minister and state senator in Georgia during the Reconstruction Era after the American Civil War. He was a Republican who represented Warren County, Georgia. He supported civil rights for African Americans and reported racially motivated violence by the Ku Klux Klan. He was murdered in May 1869, after having led a delegation to Washington, D.C. to obtain military protection against widespread acts of violence by the Klan.

== Background ==
The Ku Klux Klan became violent in Georgia on or before March 30, 1868, when 30 members of the Klan killed white politician George Ashburn after he spoke at a public rally that day. The Klan spread across Georgia and by the fall 260 cases were filed of violence inflicted on blacks, but the court cases were denied by black people against whites. There were also instances where the Klan attacked Georgian Republicans, regardless of the color of their skin. In October 1868, there was a report of 32 assassinations and 212 assaults to the Committee on Murder and Outrages at a convention held in Macon, Georgia.

Critics of Adkins considered him a scalawag, someone disloyal to the Confederacy. He supported civil rights for blacks. He also supported posted a statutory bond for someone hated by the Klan and conservatives, Sheriff John Norris in April 1868. He also reported racist crimes and the name of a suspect, Ellis Adams, who was a member of the Klan. Violence continued into 1869, and he led a delegation to Washington, D.C. to request military support in Georgia for safety of its citizens.

== Murder ==
Although he was warned that white supremacists were targeting him and that he was in danger, Adkins travelled from Washington, D.C. to his home to see his family and attend to personal affairs. Adkins was assassinated by members of the Ku Klux Klan on his way home from the train station at Dearing, Georgia on May 10, 1869. Before he died, he was able to name one of the gang who shot him, Ellis Adams.

His wife, Sallie Adkins (identified as Sarah Adkins in some official documents), submitted a petition to the United States Congress about the events.

== Aftermath ==
There were unsubstantiated rumors questioning Adkins' honor and fidelity. Adams died in December 1869, not having been charged for the murder of Adkins. Violence by the Klan and other violent persons continued through much of 1871, the year of the Ku Klux Klan Act.

Stephen Ward Angell reported that Ayer and Adkins had been "brutally slaughtered because they dared to be Republicans, and possessed such an amount of integrity that they defied both bribes and threats."
