= Samuel Williams (Georgia politician) =

U.S politician during the Reconstruction Era

Member of the Georgia House of Representatives from the Harris County district
- In office 1868 – ? Original 33

Personal details
- Born: 1820
- Party: Republican

Samuel Williams was a representative in the Georgia Assembly during the Reconstruction Era. He was African American, a Republican, and represented Harris County in the Georgia House of Representatives. Williams was born around 1820.
