= Tunis Campbell Sr. =

American politician (1812–1891)

Tunis Campbell
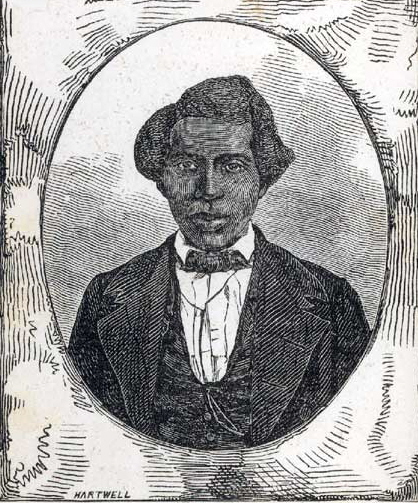

Personal details
- Born: April 1, 1812 Middlebrook, New Jersey, U.S.
- Died: December 4, 1891 (aged 79) Allston, Boston, Massachusetts, U.S.
- Party: Republican

Rev. Tunis Gulic Campbell Sr. (April 1, 1812 – December 4, 1891), called "the oldest and best known clergyman in the African Methodist Church", served as a voter registration organizer, Justice of the Peace, a delegate to the Georgia Constitutional Convention of 1867–1868, and as a Georgia state senator during the Reconstruction era. He also published an autobiography, Sufferings of the Reverend T.G. Campbell and His Family in Georgia (1877). An African American, he was a major figure in Reconstruction Georgia. He reportedly had a 400-person militia to protect him from the Ku Klux Klan. Like Governor Rufus Bullock, he eventually had to flee the state to save his life.

== Biography ==
Born in Middlebrook, New Jersey, Tunis Campbell was one of ten siblings, the son of a blacksmith. At age 5 he was "taken in charge" by a white man, who sent him to what he later described as an "Episcopal" boarding school in Babylon, Long Island, New York; he was the only Black student there. It was part of First Presbyterian Church of Babylon. The sender was likely a member of Presbyterian Church at Bound Brook, another of the oldest Scottish Presbyterian congregations in the US. There he remained until he was 18. He then became a "Methodist," and turned down an invitation to go to Africa as a missionary. He began his career as an abolitionist and anti-colonization lecturer, and Methodist and Temperance preacher. In 1832 he set up an anticolonization society in Brooklyn. He was several times mobbed and once was nearly killed.

=== A head waiter in New York ===
Campbell was the principal waiter at the Howard Hotel in New York City for some time (at least from 1842 to 45). He later wrote a well-regarded 1848 guide to hotel management, Hotel Keepers, Head Waiters, and Housekeepers' Guide (1848), one of the earliest hospitality books by an African American. A collection of culinary recipes and counsel on hotel management, its advice to employers and employees alike, offered guidance to African-American workers in one of the available sources of paid employment.

At the same time, Campbell was active in establishing schools for "colored children" in New York, the city of Brooklyn, New York, the village of Williamsburg, New York (both part of the borough of Brooklyn since 1898), and Jersey City, New Jersey. He assisted fugitive slaves whenever possible. He received a contract to raise 4,000 United States Colored Troops.

=== Military Governor of Georgia Sea Islands ===
In March 1865, he was sent as Military Governor to the Sea Islands of Georgia: Ossabaw, Colonels, St. Catherine's, and Sapelo Island. During two years he established schools and a government. When Georgia planters, through pardons from President Andrew Johnson, regained the islands in 1866, expelling the Black farmers, Campbell bought 1,250 acres (510 ha) at Belle Ville in McIntosh County, Georgia, where he established an association of black landowners to own parcels. Effectively, he established colonies on these islands.

=== A Georgia politician ===
In 1867, to help freedmen vote, Campbell was appointed to the Board of Registration in Georgia. He and another Black registrar were poisoned; the other registrar died, according to Campbell. He joined the Georgia Educational Association, a launching pad for several Black political careers in the Reconstruction era. He was elected state senator in Georgia in 1868. He also campaigned for his son Tunis Gulic Campbell Jr. to be a state representative. Both won, only to be expelled from office because a majority of white Georgia legislators agreed that even though blacks had the right to vote, the Georgia constitution prohibited them from holding office. (See Original 33.) Campbell Sr. was able to return to office in 1871, but lost a bid for re-election in 1872. During his time as state senator, Campbell served on the Senate's Petitions and General Education committees. His post-legislative work as Justice of the Peace enraged former slave owners (a Black with authority over whites).

"Campbell would be indicted on multiple charges in the mid-1870s, largely trumped up by those who saw the opportunity to finally oust him from the Georgia political arena... a judicial lynching.". He served hard labor on a Georgia prison chain gang. When released, he left Georgia for good. He published in 1877 a pamphlet about his experiences: Sufferings of the Reverend T. G. Campbell and His Family in Georgia.

== Death ==
He died in Allston, Boston, Massachusetts, on December 4, 1891.

== Writings ==
- Campbell, Tunis G. (1848). Hotel keepers, head waiters, and housekeepers' guide. Boston: Coolidge and Wiley.
- Campbell, Tunis G. (1877). Sufferings of the Reverend T.G. Campbell and His Family in Georgia. Washington, D.C.
