= Abram Colby =

American politician

- Born: 1822; Greene County, Georgia
- Died: September 10, 1872 (aged 49–50); Greene County, Georgia
- Other name: Abram Colby
- Occupations: Minister and politician
- Known for: Helped form a chapter of the American Equal Rights Association

Abram Colby (1822 – September 10, 1872) was an American minister and politician who served in the Georgia House of Representatives during the Reconstruction era. He was enslaved by his father.

== Early life and family ==
Colby was the son of an enslaved woman named Mary Minnie and an Irish plantation owner called John Colby. Abram resided in Greene County, Georgia, and was freed fifteen years prior to emancipation. He was an early organizer of freed slaves. Colby and minister Henry McNeal Turner worked together to form a chapter of the American Equal Rights Association.

He was married to Anne Colby and they had three children: Ella, Julia, and William.

== Service ==
Colby was known for eloquent oratory, and represented Greene County in 1865 at a freeman's convention. A Radical Republican, Colby was first elected in 1868. Colby could not read, so he kept his son close to him during all official legislative matters, to act as his secretary.

In the election of 1868 under the "Reconstruction Constitution", roughly 1,200 of Greene County's 1,500 eligible black voters turned out to help elect two Republicans to the House. They were Colby and a former Confederate Major, moderate republican Robert McWhorter, who went on to serve as Speaker of the House. In that same election, Ulysses S. Grant carried Greene County in the presidential race. Unable to defeat Colby at the polls, and failing in their attempts to intimidate black voters, Greene County Democrats and local merchants offered Colby $5,000 to switch to the Democratic party, or $2,500 to simply resign his seat in the Legislature. Colby responded that he would not do it for all the wealth in Greene County. Two nights later, he was attacked and beaten.

== Beating by the KKK ==
On October 29, 1869, he was taken from his bed and beaten by 65 Ku Klux Klan members in front of his family. One of them pointed a gun (but did not fire it) at his young daughter Amanda. She died soon afterward, and Colby believed the trauma of the attack was partly responsible.

During his whipping he was asked, "Do you think you will ever vote another damned Radical ticket." He replied, "If there was an election tomorrow, I would vote the Radical ticket." After his remark, the men continued to beat him. Governor Bullock offered a reward of $5,000 for the arrest of the attackers. Faced with debilitating injury, he was unable to work and did not seek re-election.

In 1872, he was called before a joint U.S. House and Senate committee investigating reports of Southern violence. His injuries were so extensive Colby was recorded saying in his testimony during the Joint Select Committee Report: "They broke something inside of me, and the doctor has been attending to me for more than a year. Sometimes I cannot get up and down off my bed, and my left hand is not of much use to me."
