= John T. Costin =

U.S politician during the Reconstruction Era

Member of the Georgia House of Representatives from the Talbot County district

Personal details
- Born: Virginia
- Party: Republican

John T. Costin was a Republican Party organizer, a member of the Georgia Legislature, and a minister in Georgia, United States, during the Reconstruction Era (1863 or 1865 - 1877). Costin helped form the Republican Party of Georgia He met with U.S. President Abraham Lincoln. Costin was a freemason and held the title of Grand Master (Masonic). Costin was described as a scion of one of Washington's most illustrious families.

Costin was born in Virginia.
