= Thomas M. Allen (Georgia politician) =

American politician

Member of the Georgia House of Representatives from the Jasper County district
- In office 1868–?

Personal details
- Party: Republican

Thomas M. Allen was an American Baptist preacher who served as a representative in the Georgia Assembly during the Reconstruction Era. He was African American. He was elected in 1868, representing Jasper County as a Republican. Allen escaped assassination by the Ku Klux Klan after they murdered his brother-in-law by mistake during their attempt on his life.
