= Alexander Stone =

U.S politician during the Reconstruction Era

Member of the Georgia House of Representatives from the Jefferson County district
- In office 1868 – 1868; Original 33

Personal details
- Party: Republican

Alexander Stone was a member of Georgia's constitutional convention held in 1867 and 1868 and was an elected member of the Georgia Legislature in 1868. He was a Republican.

== Biography ==
Stone and 25 of 29 African Americans elected during the post-American Civil War Reconstruction Era were prohibited from taking office by their white colleagues. Stone was elected to represent Jefferson County, Georgia. After federal intervention, African Americans were able to hold office following the 1870 election in Georgia. But Ku Klux Klan activity, Jim Crow laws, poll taxes, and voter intimidation intensified as the Reconstruction era ended.

Stone was accused of graft while in office, but was cleared of charges he was bribed to oppose Reconstruction measures.
