= George H. Clower =

American politician

Member of the Georgia House of Representatives from the Monroe County district
- In office 1868–?

Personal details
- Party: Republican

George H. Clower was a state legislator and schoolteacher in Central Georgia during the Reconstruction era. He was one of two African Americans elected from Central Georgia to Georgia's legislature during that period.

Clower was a Republican Party organizer of "Grant clubs" in support of former Union Army commanding general Ulysses S. Grant in his presidential candidacy. Several of Clower's letters appealing for support for his African American Community from the Freedmen Bureau and appealing to Grant himself survive.

Eric Foner lists him as George A. Flower in Freedom's Lawmakers and states that he was born in Virginia, attended the state black convention in Alabama in October 1866, was elected to the Georgia House of Representatives in 1868, was expelled along with other African American members the same year and reinstated along with the others in 1870 by order of the U.S. Congress.
