= Expelled Because of Color =

Statue in Atlanta, Georgia, US commemorating black legislators

- Artist: John T. Riddle
- Completion date: February 16, 1978
- Location: Georgia State Capitol, Atlanta, Georgia, United States
- 33.748966°N 84.387681°W

Expelled Because of Color is a bronze sculpture, 6 feet (1.8 m) tall, by John Thomas Riddle, Jr. It is located on the grounds of the Georgia State Capitol, 240 State Capitol SW, Atlanta, Georgia. It was commissioned in 1976 by the Georgia Legislative Black Caucus and unveiled on February 16, 1978, the second annual Georgia Association of Black Elected Officials Day.

The statue commemorates the Original 33, the 33 African-American legislators who were expelled from the Georgia legislature in 1868.

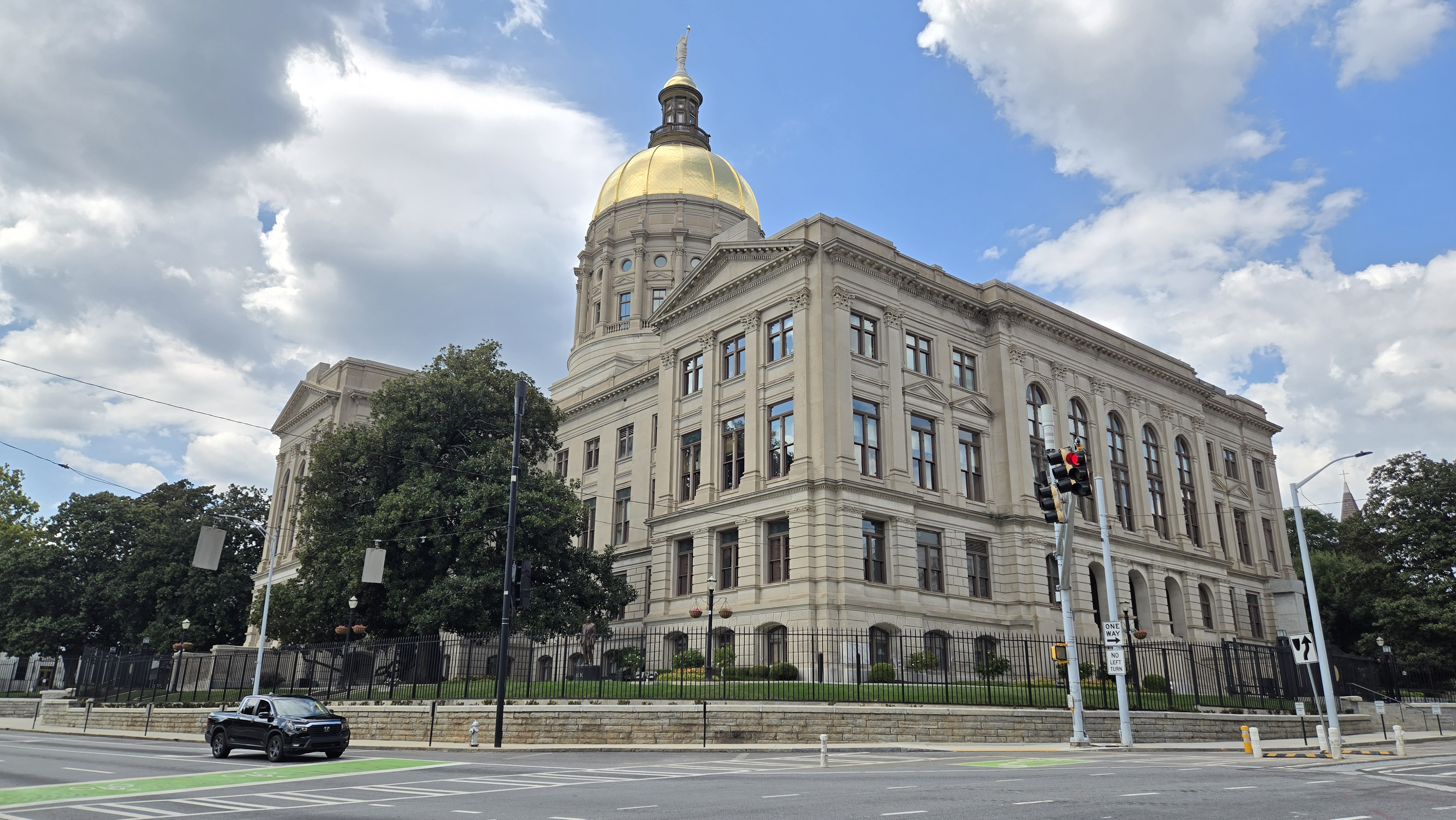
The Georgia State Capitol as viewed from the northeast.

A plaque on the sculpture reads:

“Expelled Because of Color” is dedicated to the memory of the 33 Black state legislators who were elected, yet expelled from the Georgia House because of their color in 1868.

The cinder block forms at the base of the sculpture symbolize the building of black political awareness and self-representation in Georgia. Our enslavement, our role in the Revolutionary War, the Black church, our labor and the right to vote are components of the black Georgian's struggle from the slave ship to the State House.

— John Riddle, sculptor
