= Thomas P. Beard =

Thomas Payce Beard (December 28, 1837 – December 4, 1918) was a leader in the African American community, a Republican Party organizer, and part of a contested election in Georgia during the post-American Civil War Reconstruction Era. He contested the election of his Democratic Party opponent Stephen A. Corker to the U.S. House of Representatives citing voter intimidation including violent attacks, local police and election official interference, vote rigging, and voter fraud. Beard helped organize African American voters in the Republican Party after the American Civil War.

== 1870 election ==
The elections results given by the Georgia Secretary of State were 14,678 for Corker and 9,112 for Beard. The results were contested by Beard. Beard reported that Republicans were compelled through threats of violence to vote for Corker against their wills, that there were numerous incidents of voting fraud, and that Republicans had been beaten, shot at, and maltreated prior to and during the election. Corker denied the allegations and countered that the Republicans were not united behind Beard. Corker presented his credentials to Congress and was seated on January 24, 1871 pending the results of the Elections Committee. A Federal investigation into election began soon afterwards. Testimony was taken by witnesses of the election in the middle of February 1871. One witness, Washington Dawson, recalled Republican voters being threatened with being attacked by the Ku Klux Klan if they did not vote the Democratic ticket. Other witnesses reported the election to have been peaceful and fair, and that some blacks had voted willingly for Corker. The case never came before the Elections Committee. Corker served until the end of his term on March 3, 1871 for a total of thirty-nine days.

== Legacy ==
Beard is buried at Cedar Grove Cemetery in Augusta, Richmond County, Georgia.
