= William Henry Harrison (Georgia politician) =

American politician

Member of the Georgia House of Representatives from the Hancock County, Georgia district
- In office 1868–?

Personal details
- Born: Bill Thomas Hancock County, Georgia
- Party: Republican
- Parent(s): Eliza and Harrison McLane

William Henry Harrison, also known as Bill Thomas (born September 1843-unknown), was a state legislator from Hancock County, Georgia.

== Early life ==
Bill was born into slavery, the son of a woman named Eliza and Harrison McLane, who died about 1854 or 1855. He had three sisters and two brothers. After his father died, 14 year old Bill became a slave of Judge James Thomas in southwestern Hancock County, Georgia. He became his body servant and was literate, having been taught to read the bible by the judge. Seeking his freedom, he was among the about 100 people involved in the Sparta insurrection of September 13, 1863. Bill Thomas was emancipated at the end of the Civil War and changed his name to William Henry Harrison.

Members of his family are said to be buried at the Brown Chapel A.M.E. Church cemetery in the county.

== Legislator ==
He was a leader of Georgia's African-American community during the Reconstruction Era after the American Civil War. He was one of two African-American representatives, along with Eli Barnes, elected to the Georgia Legislature as a Republican from Hancock County, Georgia in April 1868.

== Ku Klux Klan testimony ==
During this period, "wholesale violence broke out against black people" by the Ku Klux Klan and other white people. Barnes and Harrison testified before the U.S. Congress on Ku Klux Klan violent activity in Georgia under the Ku Klux Act of 1871. Barnes stated that it was common for black families to be visited in the night by white men who assaulted their wives and daughters and caused mayhem. Harrison said that after the American Civil War more blacks were whipped than under slavery. Many people were murdered.
