= George Wallace (Georgia politician) =

American politician

Georgia Senate

Personal details
- Party: Republican

Military service
- Allegiance: Confederate States of America
- Branch/service: Confederate States Army
- Rank: body servant
- Battles/wars: Civil War

George Wallace was an African-American state senator from Georgia during the Reconstruction Era. He represented Hancock County, Baldwin County, and Washington County. He was a Republican. On September 12, 1868, the Georgia State Senate voted to exclude members with mixed heritage. The Georgia House had already kicked out their African American members.

During the American Civil War, Wallace was reported to have been a body servant for Captain Howard Tinsley, to have been at Appomattox when Robert E. Lee surrendered, and to have ridden General Philip Cook's war-horse "Old Whitey" back to family members of its owner.
