= Clermont (Alexandria, Virginia) =

Coordinates: 38°47.335′N 77°6.774′W

Clermont was an 18th-century plantation in Fairfax County (now Alexandria), Virginia, United States. Clermont is best known as the home of John Mason (April 4, 1766 – March 19, 1849), an early American merchant and planter and a son of George Mason, a Founding Father of the United States. Clermont is also known for being the birthplace of Fitzhugh Lee (November 9, 1835 – April 18, 1905), nephew of Robert E. Lee, grandson of John Mason, Confederate cavalry general in the American Civil War, Governor of Virginia, diplomat, and United States Army general in the Spanish–American War.

== History ==
Clermont Plantation was built by Benjamin Dulaney in the late 18th century. Dulaney, a friend of George Washington, used the estate as his summer residence. Clermont was large in size with two parlors, eleven bedrooms, and multiple outbuildings. Dulaney's family members were loyalists during the American Revolutionary War and many of them lost their possessions and property. Dulaney's property was spared, probably due to his friendship with Washington, but Dulaney attempted to sell Clermont to Washington, Washington refused. Dulaney married Washington's goddaughter, daughter of Daniel French of Rose Hill.

After Dulaney, Clermont hosted a succession of tenants and owners. Between 1803 and 1804, Clermont was the residence of Reverend Thomas Davis, Vicar of Christ Church in Alexandria. Davis tried unsuccessfully to establish a school for young men at Clermont. Reverend Davis is best known for officiating at Washington's burial service.

General John Mason was the next resident of Clermont. Mason had two other homes, one in Georgetown and a summer residence on Analostan Island. After suffering financial setbacks, Mason was forced to give up his island residence, and in 1833, he and his family relocated to the Virginia countryside at Clermont.

After Mason's death, the Alexandria Gazette ran an advertisement for the sale of Clermont on 28 May 1849. The advertisement read as follows:

FOR SALE -- This estate is distant about four miles from Alexandria, and one mile south of the Little Turnpike Road, leading to the Town, comprising about 320 acres of land. The arable land, of which about 160 acres is level bottom on Cameron Run, is in a state of high fertility, having been well drained, and the whole with about 40 acres of upland, judiciously cultivated and improved, by Clover and Plaister, with the free use of lime and other manure. It is divided into seven fields, one a large meadow of timothy, with one or more fine springs in each. The residue of the tract, exclusive of the lawns, orchards, and gardens, is in young wood. The Mansion and its appurtenances are of the most ample and commodious description, beautifully situated on a gentle eminence, and overlooking the Town of Alexandria and the lowlands of the estate. The dwelling house on the first floor contains two parlors, besides large library, and an office, with eleven chambers above stairs, and in the buildings appurtenant to it, besides an ample kitchen, laundry, and housekeeper's room, a dairy, bath-house, smoke house, ample accommodations for servants, ice house, the houses of farm servants, blacksmith's shop, a kiln of brick for burning lime, with ample barns, stabling, and other houses for stock and farm purposes, orchards of choice fruit, ornamental grounds and walks -- the whole in good order and well preserved by its late proprietor.

Clermont was purchased by Commodore French Forrest, head of the Washington Navy Yard. Forrest was the son of Major Joseph Forrest and his wife Elizabeth French Dulaney, daughter of Clermont's original owner. During the American Civil War, Forrest resigned his commission with the United States Navy and offered his services to Virginia. Forrest never again set foot on Clermont. Forrest assumed command of the Norfolk Naval Shipyard where he supervised the construction of the CSS Virginia. During the war, Clermont was confiscated by the Union Army and used as small pox hospital. The mansion was subsequently burned to prevent the further spread of the disease.

== Notable people ==
- Fitzhugh Lee (1835–1905), son of Sydney Smith Lee and his wife Anna Maria Mason, was born at Clermont on 19 November 1835
