= William A. Bradley =

American politician

11th Mayor of the City of Washington, D.C.
- In office June 9, 1834 – June 13, 1836
- Preceded by: John Peter Van Ness
- Succeeded by: Peter Force

Personal details
- Born: February 25, 1794 Guilford, CT
- Died: August 28, 1867 (aged 73) Broad Top City, Pennsylvania
- Resting place: Glenwood Cemetery; Washington, D.C.

William A. Bradley (February 25, 1794 – August 28, 1867) was an American politician who served as the eleventh Mayor of Washington, D.C. from 1834 to 1836.

Once the cashier for the Bank of Washington, Bradley was postmaster for the city of Washington in the 1850s until he was removed by President Franklin Pierce in 1853.

In 1851, he purchased Analostan Island (now Theodore Roosevelt Island) from the estate of John Carter. The island had previously been part of the land holdings of Virginia patriot George Mason, and he used the estate as an entertainment resort. During the American Civil War, it was converted to be used as a training camp, known as Camp Greene. After the war, Bradley used it as a resort again until his death in 1867.

During the 1820s, Bradley was a member of the Columbian Institute for the Promotion of Arts and Sciences, who counted among their members former presidents Andrew Jackson and John Quincy Adams and many prominent men of the day, including well-known representatives of the military, government service, medical and other professions.

Bradley was a director for the original Chesapeake & Ohio Canal Company, chartered in 1850.

He was interred at Glenwood Cemetery.

In 1887, a new schoolhouse on 13th 1/2 Street SE (later Linworth Place, SE) between C and D was named Bradley School in his honor. It was closed sometime after 1921.

Political offices
Preceded by John P. Van Ness	Mayor of Washington, D.C. 1834–1836	Succeeded by Peter Force
