= John Mason (planter) =

Early American merchant, banker, and planter (1766–1849)

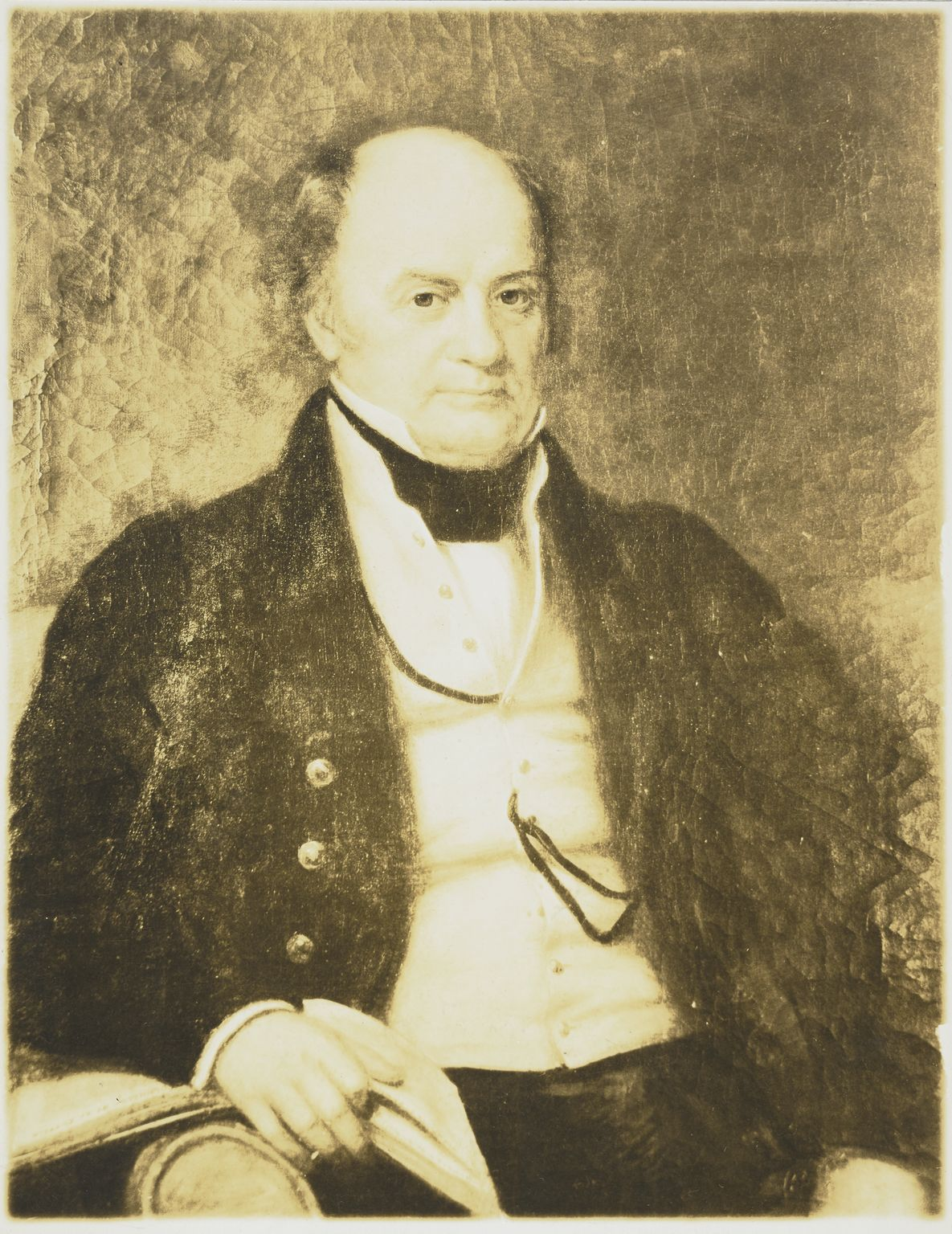
- Born: April 4, 1766; Mattawoman, Charles County, Province of Maryland
- Died: March 19, 1849 (aged 82); Virginia, United States
- Resting place: Christ Church Cemetery, Alexandria, Virginia
- Occupations: merchant, banker, officer (armed forces), planter
- Spouse: Anna Maria Murray
- Children: 10, including James Murray Mason and Murray Mason
- Parent(s): George Mason IV; Ann Eilbeck

John Mason (April 4, 1766 – March 19, 1849) was an early American merchant, banker, officer (armed forces), and planter. As a son of George Mason, a Founding Father of the United States, Mason was a scion of the prominent Mason political family.

== Early life and education ==
Mason was born on April 4, 1766, at Mattawoman plantation, the estate of his maternal grandparents William Eilbeck and Sarah Edgar Eilbeck. He was eighth child and fifth-eldest son of George Mason IV and his wife Ann Eilbeck. Like his brothers, Mason was tutored at his father's estate, Gunston Hall, in Fairfax County, Virginia. His tutors were Scotsmen Mr. Davidson and Mr. Constable. After the American Revolutionary War, Mason, his brother Thomas, and a cousin, studied with Reverend Buchnan, rector of Aquia and Pohick churches, who resided on Passapatanzy Creek.

Mason completed his formal education in mathematics with another Scotsman, Mr. Hunter, in Calvert County, Maryland. He was then apprenticed to a Quaker merchant William Hartshorne of the firm of Harper & Hartshorne in Alexandria, Virginia. Mason accompanied his father George Mason to the Philadelphia Convention, but returned to continue his apprenticeship with Hartshorne before the Convention ended. Mason remained with Hartshorne until spring 1788, when he then entered into a partnership with merchants James and Joseph Fenwick of Maryland.

== Merchant and banking career ==
On June 22, 1788, Mason travelled to Bordeaux, France to conduct business for Fenwick & Mason firm there. Despite the onset of the French Revolution, Mason remained in France until 1791 and only then left due to his ill health. The Bordeaux branch of Fenwick & Mason continued to thrive, but was liquidated in 1793 because of the encroaching threat of war in Europe. Declining prices of tobacco were also partly to blame for the firm's Bordeaux closure.

By Spring 1792, Mason had established a branch of Fenwick & Mason in Georgetown. As the firm expanded, it became involved in a variety of other lucrative ventures including bankinging, international commerce, the organization of foundries, and navigation and turnpike companies. Fenwick & Mason also became involved in the flour and wheat trade in addition to its tobacco operations. His father also told him to supervise his youngest brother, Thomas, whom their father had likewise apprenticed with an Alexandria merchant before setting him up in business in Richmond, Virginia. However, their father died by year end. His eldest brother, George Mason V, filed a will with the Fairfax County Circuit Court that their father had executed in 1773, shortly after their mother's death. Despite their father's speeches urging abolition of slavery in the U.S. Constitutional Convention, that will freed no slaves, but made his grown sons wealthy men. Around the time of George Mason V's death, John Mason both built a house on Analostan Island which he inherited from their father. He and Thomas then become their father's executors, the other named executor, neighbor Martin Cockburn who had become the Prince William county sheriff, then judge, declining to serve.

John Mason also served on the board of directors of the Bank of Columbia and became its president in 1798. Around this same time, Mason purchased large tracts of land in the Federal City. In 1805 he also agreed to construction of a causeway to Analostan Island, from which he operated a ferry service between Virginia and Georgetown, where he also had a residence. Alexandria merchants unsuccessfully petitioned Congress and Virginia's legislature to take back the island and approximately 26 square miles of the 100 square mile federal city in 1804 and 1824 (only succeeding in 1846, after the then-elderly Mason was disabled by a stroke). In 1809 he received approval to construct a turnpike between his ferry and the Alexandria turnpike into the federal city (that became U.S. Route 1).

In 1807, Mason was appointed Superintendent of Indian Trade, and held that position until 1816. Mason also became the first Commanding General brigadier general of the District of Columbia militia, which is today's District of Columbia National Guard. He was appointed by President Thomas Jefferson on June 28, 1802—a position he would hold until 1811. Through this role, Mason became commissioner general of prisoners during the War of 1812. He also helped President Madison and other federal officials escape into Virginia when the British burned many buildings in the new national capital during that war.

In 1817, he became the president of the Potomac Company. His nephew Thomson Francis Mason was later chairman of the Alexandria Canal further downstream.

Mason acquired Henry Foxall's Foxhall Cannon Foundry in Georgetown in 1815. Mason continued to operate the foundry until his death in 1849. For five years after Mason's death, the foundry remained part of the Mason estate with Mason's son Maynadier Mason as its superintendent.

In 1833, financial reverses caused Mason to move his family to Clermont, four miles outside Alexandria in the Cameron Run valley.

== Marriage and children ==
Mason married Anna Maria Murray, daughter of James Murray and his wife Sarah Ennalls Maynadier, in Annapolis, Maryland on February 10, 1796. The couple had ten children:

- John T. Mason Jr. (February 18, 1797– August 11, 1859)
- James Murray Mason (November 3, 1798– April 28, 1871)
- Sarah Maria Mason (September 11, 1800– July 29, 1890) married Samuel Cooper
- Virginia Mason (October 12, 1802– January 21, 1838)
- Catherine Eilbeck Mason Jamison (July 12, 1804– March 7, 1888)
- Eilbeck Mason (May 20, 1806– June 28, 1862)
- Murray Mason (January 4, 1808– January 11, 1875)
- Maynadier Mason (January 4, 1808 – April 1865)
- Anna Maria Mason (February 26, 1811– November 3, 1898) married Sydney Smith Lee
- Joel Barlow Mason (June 9, 1813 – 1861)

== Residences ==
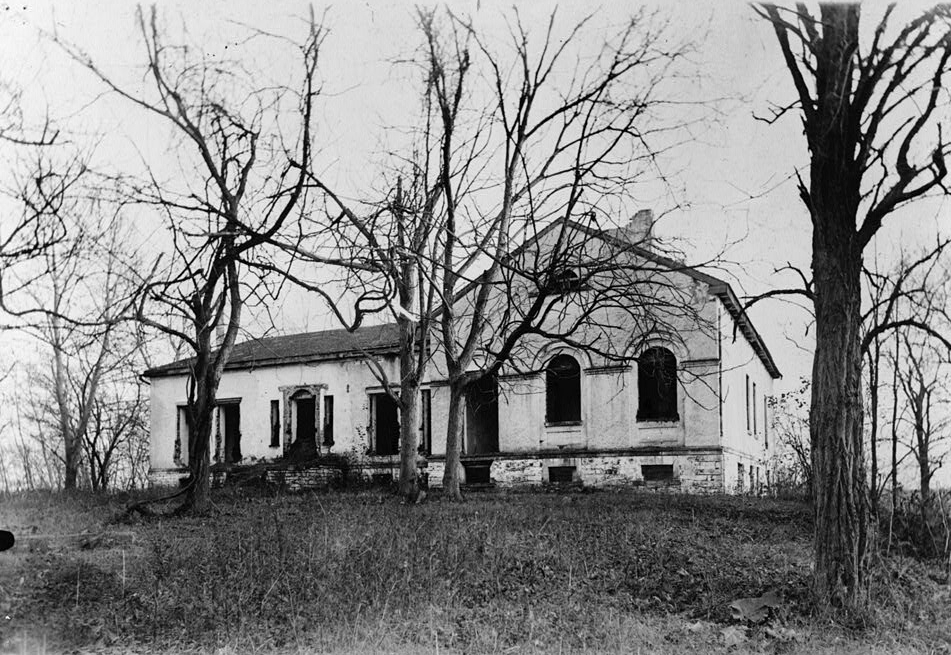
Analostan Island mansion photographed in the 19th century.

Following Mason's marriage to Anna Maria Murray in 1796, he settled in Georgetown on property located at the corner of present-day 25th and L Streets and Pennsylvania Avenue, Northwest. Mason also built a summer residence on Analostan Island (now Theodore Roosevelt Island) on the Potomac River, which became the scene of many elegant social activities in the District of Columbia. Analostan Island had been acquired by George Mason in 1724. Mason inherited the Island from his father upon his death in 1792 and owned it until 1833. The island was famous for its gardens, which were designed and installed by English gardener David Hepburn. Mason continued the operation of the ferry which crossed the Potomac River from Georgetown to the Virginia. After suffering a series of financial setbacks, Mason was forced to give up Analostan Island, and in 1833, the family moved to Clermont in the Cameron Run valley in Fairfax County, Virginia. Mason and his family had already vacated the island in 1831 when a causeway stagnated the water in the Potomac River.

== Later life ==
Mason died on March 19, 1849, at age 82. His body was interred at Christ Church Cemetery in Alexandria, Virginia.
