= Little Island (Washington, D.C.) =

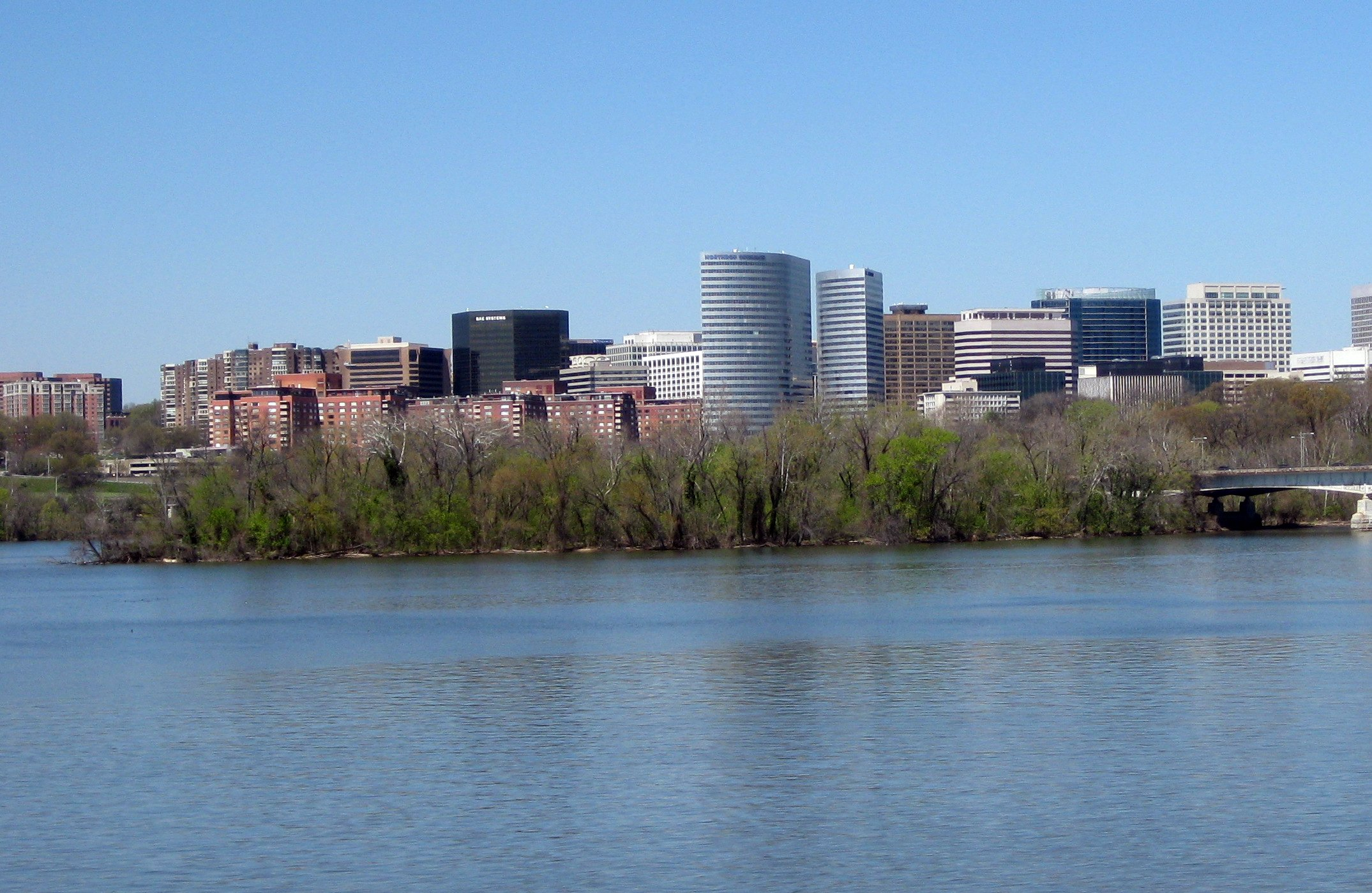
- Little Island in 2009, viewed from the Southeast, with the skyline of Rosslyn, Virginia in the background
- Interactive map of Little Island

Geography
- Location: Potomac River, Washington, D.C.
- Coordinates: 38°53′30″N 77°3′35″W
- Total islands: 1
- Area: 0.0024 sq mi (0.0062 km^{2})
- Highest elevation: 3 ft (0.9 m)

Administration
- United States

Demographics
- Population: 0

Additional information
- Located under the Theodore Roosevelt Bridge

Little Island is an island in the Potomac River in Washington, D.C., just south of Theodore Roosevelt Island and the Theodore Roosevelt Bridge.

== Geography ==
Little Island's coordinates are 38.891°N, 77.059°W. Its area is 1.547 acres (0.6 ha). Little Island is the sixth largest island in the District of Columbia. It is uninhabited, undeveloped, and entirely wooded. It is separated from Theodore Roosevelt Island by a small channel. The only access to it is by boat. It is not part of Theodore Roosevelt Island Park, although it is managed together with Theodore Roosevelt Island. The island is in the shape of a rounded triangle. Historically, the island was also known as South Island, Swan Island, and Small Island.
