= Henry McNeal Turner =

American minister, politician, and newspaper publisher (1834–1915)

The Right Reverend Henry McNeal Turner
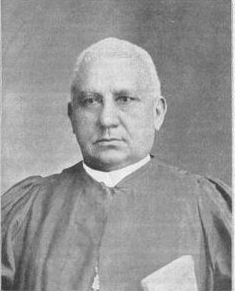

Member of the Georgia House of Representatives from the Bibb district
- In office 1868–1869

Personal details
- Born: February 1, 1834 Newberry, South Carolina, United States
- Died: May 8, 1915 (aged 81) Windsor, Ontario, Canada
- Party: Republican
- Spouse(s): Eliza Peacher; Martha Elizabeth DeWitt; Harriet A. Wayman; Laura Pearl Lemon
- Children: 14
- Parent(s): Hardy Turner; Sarah Greer

Henry McNeal Turner (February 1, 1834, South Carolina, U.S. – May 8, 1915, Ontario, Canada) was an American minister, politician, and the 12th elected and consecrated bishop of the African Methodist Episcopal Church (AME). After the American Civil War, he worked to establish new A.M.E. congregations among African Americans in Georgia. Born free in South Carolina, Turner learned to read and write and became a Methodist preacher. He joined the AME Church in St. Louis, Missouri, in 1858, where he became a minister. Founded by free blacks in Philadelphia, Pennsylvania, in the early 19th century, the A.M.E. Church was the first independent black denomination in the United States. Later Turner had pastorates in Baltimore, Maryland, and Washington, DC.

In 1863 during the American Civil War, Turner was appointed by the US Army as the first African-American chaplain in the United States Colored Troops. After the war, he was appointed to the Freedmen's Bureau in Georgia. He settled in Macon and was elected to the state legislature in 1868 during the Reconstruction era. An A.M.E. missionary, he also planted many AME churches in Georgia after the war. In 1880 he was elected as the first Southern bishop of the AME Church, after a fierce battle within the denomination because of its Northern roots.

Angered by the Democrats' regaining power and instituting laws in the late nineteenth century South, Turner began to support and emigration of blacks to the African continent. This movement started before the Civil War, though Turner was the chief figure in the late nineteenth century to support such emigration to Liberia; most African-American leaders of the time were pushing for rights in the United States.

== Early life ==
Henry McNeal Turner was born free in 1834 in Newberry, South Carolina, to Sarah Greer and Hardy Turner, who were both of mixed African-European ancestry. Some sources say he was born in Abbeville, South Carolina. His paternal grandparents were a white woman planter and an African man. According to the legal standard of partus sequitur ventrem, the white woman's mixed-race children were born free, because she was white and free.

According to the family's oral tradition, his maternal grandfather had been enslaved in the African continent and imported to South Carolina, where he was renamed as David Greer. Slave traders subsequently noticed that he had royal Mandingo tribal marks, and freed him from slavery. According to the same family lore, Greer began to work for a Quaker family in South Carolina. Greer married a free African woman. Henry Turner grew up with his mother Sarah (Greer) Turner and maternal grandmother.

At the time, South Carolina law prohibited teaching Africans to read and write. When Turner was apprenticed to work in cotton fields alongside captured Africans, he ran away to Abbeville. He found a job as a custodian for a law firm in Abbeville.

== Early career ==
At the age of 14, Turner was inspired by a Methodist revival and swore to become a pastor. He received his preacher's license at the age of 19 from the Methodist Church South in 1853 (the national church had divided into North and South units in 1844 over slavery and other issues). Turner traveled through the South for a few years as an evangelist and exhorter, a position usually reserved for young, unmarried men.

In 1858 he moved with his young family (he had married two years earlier) to Saint Louis, Missouri. The demand for slaves in the South had made him fear that members of his family might be kidnapped and sold into slavery, as has been documented for hundreds of free blacks. The Fugitive Slave Law of 1850 had increased incentives for the capture of refugee slaves and offered few protections for free blacks against illegal capture. It required little documentation by slave traders or people hired as slavecatchers to prove a person's slave status.

In St. Louis, Turner became ordained as a minister in the African Methodist Episcopal Church (AME), which had been founded in Philadelphia, Pennsylvania, as the first independent black denomination in the United States. He studied the classics, Hebrew and divinity at Trinity College.

Turner served in pastorates in Baltimore, Maryland, and Washington, DC, where he met influential Republicans in the early 1860s.

When the Civil War broke out, Turner was still training in Baltimore. In April 1862 he was assigned to Israel Bethel Church on Capitol Hill; it was the largest AME church in Washington, D.C. It was near the heart of government and the war in Virginia. Congressmen and army officers visited to hear Turner preach.

== Civil War ==
During the American Civil War, Turner organized one of the first regiments of black troops (Company B of the First United States Colored Troops), and was appointed as its chaplain. Turner urged both free-born blacks and "contrabands" to enlist. (The latter term refers to enslaved people who had escaped slavery and had their status classified as "unreturnable" because their former masters were engaged in war against the US government). Turner regularly preached to the men while they trained and reminded them that the "destiny of their race depended on their loyalty and courage". The regiment often marched to Turner's church to hear his patriotic speeches. In July 1863, the regiment had completed its formation and was preparing to leave for war. In November of that year, Turner was commissioned as chaplain, becoming the only black officer in the 1st USCT.

Turner discovered that the duties of a Union army chaplain in the Civil War were not well defined. Before the war, chaplains taught school at army posts. During the war, the duties expanded to include holding worship services and prayer meetings, visiting the sick and wounded in hospitals, and burying the dead. Each chaplain had to work out his role in his regiment, based on the expectations of the men in his care and his own talents. For Turner, this appointment enabled him to grow in influence among African Americans.

Turner was a chaplain for two years. Shortly after reporting for duty, he caught smallpox and spent months in the hospital recovering. He returned to his company in May 1864, just before they participated in their first armed conflict, the Battle of Wilson's Wharf on the James River. From May through December, his unit participated in the fighting around Petersburg and Richmond, Virginia. At the end of the year, they fought in the massive amphibious attack against Fort Fisher.

Turner spent the spring of 1865 with his men as they joined Sherman's march through North Carolina. When the fighting ended, he was sent to Roanoke Island to help supervise a large settlement of freed people. Discharged in September, Turner was commissioned as chaplain of a different African-American regiment, which was assigned to the Freedmen's Bureau in Georgia. Shortly after arriving there, he resigned and left the army.

He turned his attention to politics, civil rights, black nationalism, and evangelizing for the A.M.E. Church among Southern freedmen. Turner became a politician during the Reconstruction era, being elected to state government. He also was a powerful churchman, and a national race leader. While serving in the army, Turner had refined his thinking about the African race and its future in America.

He gained wider attention nationally by two activities related to the war. First, he had written numerous letters from the battlefield which were published in newspapers, and gained him attention from readers and admirers in the North. These were his base for a lifetime of journalism. Second, in the first months after the war ended, he used his position as army chaplain to attract emancipated people into the A.M.E. Church. Most former slaves had formerly belonged to white-dominated churches. The expansion of the independent AME Church in the South strongly influenced African-American life. Turner was the first of the 14 black chaplains to be appointed during the war. Both the A.M.E. Church and the A.M.E. Zion Church, based in New York, also had numerous missionaries appealing to freedmen in the South.

After the war, Turner was appointed by President Andrew Johnson to work with the Freedmen's Bureau in Georgia during Reconstruction. White clergy from the North and former military officers also led some Freedmen's Bureau operations.

== Political influence ==
In the postwar years, Turner became politically active with the Republican Party, whose officials had led the war effort and, under Abraham Lincoln, emancipated the slaves throughout the Confederacy. He helped found the Republican Party of Georgia. Turner ran for political office from Macon and was elected to the Georgia Legislature in 1868. At the time, the Democratic Party still controlled the legislature and refused to seat Turner and 26 other newly elected black legislators, all Republicans. (See Original 33.) After the federal government protested, the Democrats allowed Turner and his fellow legislators to take their seats during the second session.

In 1869, Turner was appointed by the Republican administration as postmaster of Macon, which was considered a political plum. He was dismayed after the Democrats regained power in the state and throughout the South by the late 1870s. He had seen the rise in violence at the polls, where Democrats had used intimidation and fraud to suppress black voting. In 1883, the United States Supreme Court ruled that the Civil Rights Act of 1875, forbidding racial discrimination in hotels, trains, and other public places, was unconstitutional.

Turner was incensed:

The world has never witnessed such barbarous laws entailed upon a free people as have grown out of the decision of the United States Supreme Court, issued October 15, 1883. For that decision alone authorized and now sustains all the unjust discriminations, proscriptions and robberies perpetrated by public carriers upon millions of the nation's most loyal defenders. It fathers all the 'Jim-Crow cars' into which colored people are huddled and compelled to pay as much as the whites, who are given the finest accommodations. It has made the ballot of the black man a parody, his citizenship a nullity and his freedom a burlesque. It has engendered the bitterest feeling between the whites and blacks, and resulted in the deaths of thousands, who would have been living and enjoying life today."

In the late nineteenth century, Turner witnessed state legislatures in Georgia and across the South passing measures to disfranchise blacks, largely by raising barriers to voter registration. He became a proponent of black nationalism and began to support emigration of American blacks to the African continent. He thought it was the only way they could make free and independent lives for themselves. When he traveled to Africa, he was struck by the differences in the attitude of Africans who ruled themselves and had never known the degradation of slavery.

Turner founded the International Migration Society, supported by his own newspapers: The Voice of Missions (he served as editor, 1893–1900) and later The Voice of the People (editor, 1901-4). He organized two ships with a total of 500 or more emigrants, who traveled to Liberia in 1895 and 1896. This was established as an American colony by the American Colonization Society before the Civil War, and settled by free American blacks. They tended to assume their superiority to indigenous Africans in the area, and established their own society. Disliking the lack of economic opportunity, cultural shock, and widespread tropical diseases, some of the migrants returned to the United States. After that, Turner did not organize another expedition.

== Church leadership ==
While serving as chaplain, Turner had written extensively about the Civil War as a correspondent for The Christian Recorder, the weekly newspaper of the AME Church. Later he wrote about the condition of his parishioners in postwar Georgia.

When Turner joined the AME Church in 1858, its members lived mostly in the Northern and border states, as it had been founded earlier in the century in Philadelphia and the mid-Atlantic area. Its total members numbered 20,000. His biographer Stephen W. Angell described Turner as "one of the most skillful denominational builders in American history." After the Civil War, Turner founded many AME congregations in Georgia as part of the church's missionary effort in the South.

It encouraged freedmen to establish new congregations of the first independent black denomination in the United States, and to be independent of white supervision. By 1877, the AME Church had gained more than 250,000 new adherents throughout the South. By 1896 it had a total of more than 452,000 members nationally, the majority in the South, where most blacks lived at the time.

In 1880, Turner was elected as the twelfth bishop of the A.M.E. Church. He was the first elected bishop who was from the South, and he campaigned hard within the denomination. He was one of the last bishops to have struggled up from poverty and become a self-made man. He was the first AME Bishop to ordain a woman to the order of Deacon. Because of threats and discontent among the congregations, he discontinued the controversial practice.

During and after the 1880s, Turner supported prohibition and women's suffrage movements. He served for twelve years as chancellor of Morris Brown College, a historically black college affiliated with the AME Church in Atlanta, Georgia.

During the 1890s, Turner sailed four times to Liberia and Sierra Leone. The former, at one time an American colony, had gained independence. The latter was still a British colony. As bishop, Turner organized four annual AME conferences in Africa to introduce more American blacks to the continent and organize missions in these two English-speaking jurisdictions. He also worked to establish the AME Church in South Africa, where he negotiated a merger with the Ethiopian Church. Due to his efforts, black African students from South Africa began coming to the United States to attend Wilberforce University in Ohio, a historically black college that the AME church had owned and operated since 1863. His efforts to combine missionary work with encouraging emigration to Africa were divisive in the AME Church.

But Turner crossed denominational lines in the United States, to build connections across African-American communities, for instance with black Baptists. In addition to establishing congregations, they were setting up their own state and regional associations.

Turner was known as a fiery orator. He notably preached that God was black, scandalizing some but appealing to colleagues in 1898 at the first Black Baptist Convention when he said

We have as much right biblically and otherwise to believe that God is a Negroe [sic], as you buckra or white people have to believe that God is a fine looking, symmetrical and ornamented white man. For the bulk of you and all the fool Negroes of the country believe that God is white-skinned, blue eyed, straight-haired, projected nosed, compressed lipped and finely robed white gentleman, sitting upon a throne somewhere in the heavens. Every race of people who have attempted to describe their God by words, or by paintings, or by carvings, or any other form or figure, have conveyed the idea that the God who made them and shaped their destinies was symbolized in themselves, and why should not the Negroe believe that he resembles God.

— Voice of Missions, February 1898

== Personal life ==
In 1856, Turner had married Eliza Peacher, daughter of a wealthy free black contractor in Columbia, South Carolina. They had a total of 14 children together, four of whom lived to adulthood. Eliza died in 1889.

The widower Turner married Martha Elizabeth DeWitt in 1893. After she died, he married Harriet A. Wayman in 1900. She also died in a few years. He married Laura Pearl Lemon in 1907, and outlived three of his four wives.

Turner died in 1915 while visiting Windsor, Ontario. He was buried at South-View Cemetery in Atlanta. Other civil rights leaders have also been buried here.

After his death, W.E.B. Du Bois wrote in The Crisis magazine about him:

Turner was the last of his clan, mighty men mentally and physically, men who started at the bottom and hammered their way to the top by sheer brute strength, they were the spiritual progeny of African chieftains, and they built the African church in America.

== Selected writings ==
- "The African as a Tradesman and Mechanic / address of H.M. Turner before the African Congress at the World's Fair in Chicago, August 15, 1893." [United States] : [publisher not identified], [1893?] at HathiTrust
- "The Civil and Political status of the State of Georgia and Her Relations to the General Government, reviewed and discussed in a speech delivered in the House of Representatives..." Atlanta, Ga., New Era printing establishment, 1870. at HathiTrust
- "Fifteenth Amendment; a speech on the benefits accruing from the ratification of the fifteenth amendment and its incorporation into the United States constitution, delivered at the celebration held in Macon, Ga., April 19, 1890." [n.p., 1870.] at HathiTrust
- "The genius and theory of Methodist polity; or, The machinery of Methodism, practically illustrated through a series of questions and answers." Philadelphia : Publication Dept., A.M.E. Church, [c1885] at HathiTrust
- Introduction to Men of Mark: Eminent, Progressive and Rising, by Simmons, Cleveland, Ohio, G.M. Rewell & Co., 1887.
- "Only for the bishops' eyes." [Atlanta?] : [The Author?], 1907. at HathiTrust
- Respect Black; the writings and speeches of Henry McNeal Turner. Compiled and edited by Edwin S. Redkey. New York, Arno Press, 1971.
- "A speech on the present duties and future destiny of the negro race, delivered Sept. 2, 1872." [n.p., 1872]. at HathiTrust

The following four items are available online through the University of North Carolina, at their Documenting the American South website.

- African Letters
- The Barbarous Decision of the United States Supreme Court Declaring the Civil Rights Act Unconstitutional and Disrobing the Colored Race of All Civil Protection. The Most Cruel and Inhuman Verdict Against a Loyal People in the History of the World. Also the Powerful Speeches of Hon. Frederick Douglass and Col. Robert G. Ingersoll, Jurist and Famous Orator
- "Civil Rights. The Outrage of the Supreme Court of the United States upon the Black Man", Reviewed in a Reply to the New York Voice, the Great Temperance Paper of the United States.
- The Genius and Theory of Methodist Polity, or the Machinery of Methodism. Practically Illustrated through a Series of Questions and Answers

Andre E. Johnson created the Henry McNeal Turner Project, a digital archive of the writings of Turner.

== Legacy and honors ==
- Turner Chapel in Oakville, Ontario was built in 1890 by men and women who were escaped slaves from the United States, and named in his honor.
- A portrait of Turner hangs in the state capital of Georgia.
- Turner Theological Seminary, a constituent seminary of the Interdenominational Theological Center in Atlanta, Georgia, and Turner Memorial A.M.E. Church in Hyattsville, Maryland, were named in his honor.
- In 2000, the U.S. Congress designated a Macon, Georgia post office in his honor.
- In 2002, scholar Molefi Kete Asante listed Henry McNeal Turner on his list of 100 Greatest African Americans.
- Henry McNeal Turner High School, Atlanta, Georgia

== See also ==
- Methodism
- List of African Methodist Episcopal Churches
- William Gould (W.G.) Raymond
