= William Gould Raymond =

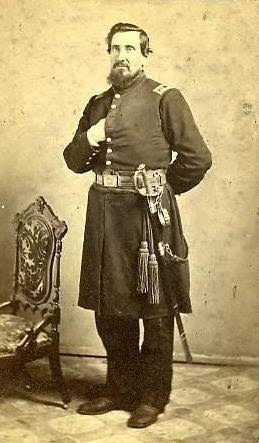
- Born: 1819; Yates County, New York
- Died: January 14, 1893
- Education: Attended Hamilton Literary & Theological Institution (now Colgate University)
- Occupation(s): Pastor; Chaplain; Union Army Soldier; Missionary; Author
- Known for: Raising of 1st United States Colored Infantry Regiment; Missionary work Author
- Spouses: Martha Smith; Lumanda Simmons
- Children: 7

William Gould (W.G.) Raymond (1819–1893), a pastor, chaplain and American soldier in the Union Army during the American Civil War, played a prominent role in the initial recruitment of the first federal African American regiments of the Union Army. In the period between the Emancipation Proclamation and the establishment of the Bureau of Colored Troops in 1863, Raymond, along with J.D. Turner, received authorization from President Abraham Lincoln to recruit and command the first federal African-American Union Army troops from the District of Columbia. Prior to this, African-American troops were raised at the state level only, without the direct authorization of Lincoln. The troops recruited by Raymond and Turner would become the 1st United States Colored Infantry Regiment and the first regiment of the United States Colored Troops (U.S.C.T), enduring threats and significant obstacles, but ultimately serving with distinction.

== Education ==
Raymond attended Hamilton Literary & Theological Institution (now Colgate University), New York.

== Career ==
=== Minister ===
Raymond was ordained into the Baptist ministry in 1843, and he served several years for congregations in New York and Pennsylvania.

=== Civil War Chaplain ===
In 1861, he enlisted with the 86th New York Volunteer Infantry ("Steuben Rangers"), Co. H, Elmira, New York and commissioned 1st Lieutenant on October 7, 1861. President Abraham Lincoln appointed him to Chaplain of the United States Hospital, Washington, D.C., on July 25, 1862. He was honorably discharged on April 13, 1863.

=== Proposal for Colored Troops ===
In April, 1863, W. G. Raymond, with J.D. Turner of Pennsylvania, also a chaplain, requested authorization from President Abraham Lincoln to raise the first federal regiment of African-American soldier volunteers for the Union Army, District of Columbia. Both Raymond and Turner were white. Increasing numbers of African-Americans and freedmen were eager to join the Union Army and to fight. Up to that point, regiments of African-American troops had been raised at the state level only, without the direct authorization of President Lincoln.

In his letters to Lincoln, Raymond stated that he was “…anxious to put down the rebellion”, and that he had secured a petition signed by leading African-Americans in the city in support of the plan. He also advised Lincoln that the plan had been submitted to Secretary of War Edwin Stanton. In Turner's letter to Lincoln he stressed his commitment to the Republican Party and his earnest interest in elevating oppressed African-Americans.

Lincoln's evolution from initially opposing then ultimately embracing the recruitment of federal African-American Union troops was gradual. Post the issuance of the Emancipation Proclamation on January 1 of that year, Lincoln still harbored concerns that ranged from the tactically political to the mistreatment and executions of former slaves captured as prisoners of war as Union soldiers. Frederick Douglass, a former slave and African-American intellectual and activist, relentlessly pressured Lincoln to change his position. Members of Lincoln's circle, including Senator Charles Sumner, as well the generals in the field, encouraged him to support the recruitment of African-American troops. Secretary Stanton had also been a consistent advocate.

Raymond and Turner persisted in their efforts to raise the 1st United States Colored Infantry in Washington, D.C., and provided Lincoln with strong personal references and support from Senators Henry Wilson and Charles Sumner, both of Massachusetts, Senator Ira Harris of New York and Governor Alexander Ramsey of Minnesota, among others.

Reverend Henry McNeal Turner, pastor of Israel Bethel AME Church, the second largest African-American church in the District of Columbia, was also an early and passionate supporter of African-American Union Army enlistment.

=== Recruitment ===
In early May 1863, Lincoln agreed to the establishment of federal African-American regiments in the Union Army and through Secretary of War Edwin Stanton authorized Raymond and Turner to commence recruitment for the District of Columbia regiment. Lincoln provided assurances that when recruitment reached 640 men, the regiment would be accepted for service. J.D. Turner would be colonel of the regiment with Raymond serving as lieutenant colonel.

Regiment recruitment quickly rose with the Rev. Henry M. Turner offering his church as a recruiting center. In anticipation of potential trouble, regiments from Massachusetts were brought in to provide protection for the recruitment meetings.

The number of confrontations and escalations continued to surge. Raymond was nearly shot when a round was fired through a window by an unknown assailant during an African-American recruitment event at the church. Assaults on the recruits reached the point that a special military commission was appointed.

=== 1st U.S. Colored Troops ===
Raymond and Turner continued recruitment and began training of regiment, paying for supplies as needed out of their own pockets. In mid-May they marched the troops in drills though sections of Washington, D.C., to build enthusiasm and to push back on the resistance.

In late May, in an effort to centralize control and reduce the chaos and opposition surrounding the surging growth of African-American troops, the War Department established the Bureau of Colored Troops, giving it responsibility for recruitment, organization and record maintenance for African-American troops.

To stem the violent resistance to the 1st U.S.C.T. training in the District of Columbia, and to ensure consistent and adequate training of the new African-American recruits, the War Department secretly moved the regiment from Camp Barker in Washington to Analostan Island (known also as Mason's Island and now Theodore Roosevelt Island) in the Potomac River. This move was so secretive that it was at first unknown to President Lincoln himself as well as to officers of the unit.

In early June, following the regiment's move to Analostan Island, training and command was transitioned from Turner and Raymond to Col. William Birney, who was more adequately experienced for this phase of the regiment's preparations for eventual battle. Turner and Raymond both lacked extensive battle experience to that point. Additionally, J.D. Turner had taken ill. Raymond continued to support the cause in Washington, D.C., serving the War Department as a Detective Officer. The Rev. Henry M. Turner went on to become Chaplain of the regiment, and is believed to be the first federally appointed African-American Chaplain in the Union Army.

The 1st U.S.C.T. fought with distinction in battles throughout Virginia and North Carolina, incurring heavy casualties. The regiment was present at the surrender of the Confederate forces in North Carolina on April 26, 1865. The 1st U.S.C.T. was officially mustered out of service on September 29, 1865.

On October 10, 1865, the regiment was formally and enthusiastically celebrated in Washington. The unit's surviving troops marched to the White House where President Andrew Johnson greeted and addressed them. The troops then marched to Campbell Hospital where, among others, Raymond (J.D. Turner was deceased) addressed the crowd from the podium. Raymond expressed his pride in the regiment, and discussed the challenges faced in raising the troops over two years earlier. He also stated that he hoped and believed that African-Americans would receive their full rights.

A bill was eventually introduced before Congress to reimburse Raymond for the personal funds he used in initially raising and provisioning the 1st U.S.C.T. regiment (47th Congress, 2nd Session. H.R. 7262). No record exists of Raymond or his estate ever being reimbursed.

== Later life ==
Raymond went on to assist Indian reservations with educational development and did wide-ranging missionary work throughout the country. In later years he battled an opium addiction resulting from pain treatments, which led to a period where he questioned his faith. He ultimately restored his faith and achieved freedom from addiction.

Raymond was active in the Grand Army of the Republic. He authored an autobiography, Life Sketches and Faith Work.

== Death ==
Raymond died on January 14, 1893, in Washington, D.C. He was interred at Arlington National Cemetery.

== See also ==
White officers in other U.S. Colored Troops regiments:

- Walter Thorn
- Edward Winslow Hinks
- Thornton Chase

== Sources ==
- Furgurson, Ernest B. (2004), Freedom Rising, New York: Alfred A. Knopf, ISBN 978-0-375-40454-2
- Gibbs, C. R. (2002). Black, Copper, and Bright: The District of Columbia's Black Civil War Regiment. Three Dimensional Pub. ISBN 978-1-877835-81-0.
- Raymond, William Gould (1891). Life Sketches and Faith Work. George E. Crosby & Company, printers. Library of Congress, 1892. (Reproduced as public domain).
- White, Ronald C. (2009-01-13). A. Lincoln: A Biography. New York: Random House Publishing Group. ISBN 978-1-58836-775-4.
