= Theodore Roosevelt Island =

Island and U.S. national memorial in Washington, D.C.

Theodore Roosevelt Island National Memorial
- IUCN category III (natural monument or feature)
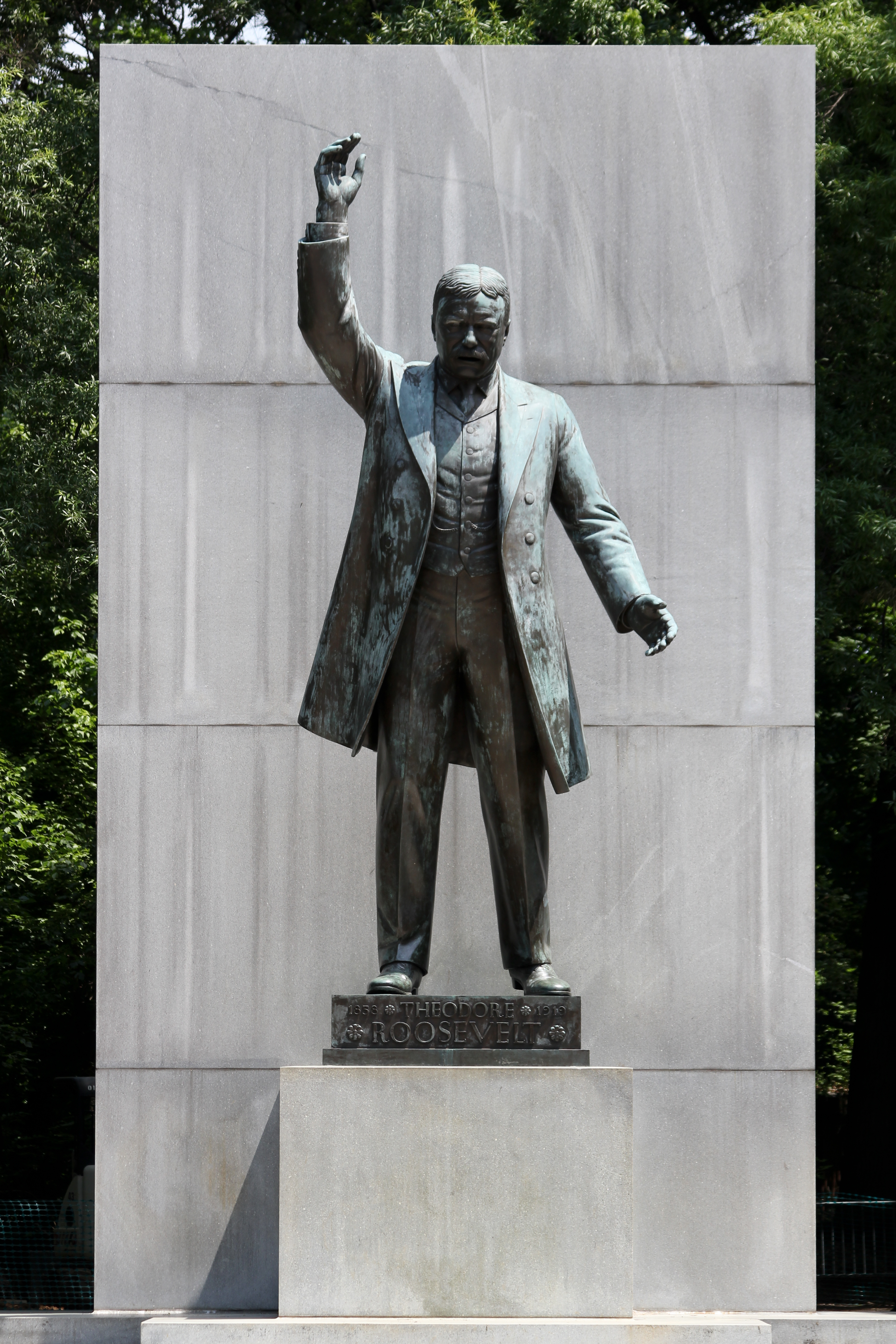
- 17-foot (5.2 m) Centerpiece Statue

- Location within Washington, D.C. Location within the United States
- Location: The Potomac River in Washington, D.C., U.S.
- Coordinates: 38°53′50″N 77°3′51″W
- Area: 88.5 acres (35.8 ha)
- Max. elevation: 44 feet (13 m)
- Established: May 21, 1932
- Visitors: 159,828 (in 2025)
- Governing body: National Park Service
- Website: Theodore Roosevelt Island

Theodore Roosevelt Island is an 88.5-acre (358,000 m^{2}) island and national memorial located in the Potomac River in Washington, D.C. During the Civil War, it was used as a training camp for the United States Colored Troops. The island was given to the federal government by the Theodore Roosevelt Association in memory of the 26th president, Theodore Roosevelt. Until then, the island had been known as My Lord's Island, Barbadoes Island, Mason's Island, Analostan Island, and Anacostine Island.

The island is maintained by the National Park Service, as part of the nearby George Washington Memorial Parkway. The land is generally maintained as a natural park, with various trails and a memorial plaza featuring a statue of Roosevelt. No cars or bicycles are permitted on the island, which is reached by a footbridge from Arlington, Virginia, on the western bank of the Potomac.

According to the National Park Service: "In the 1930s landscape architects transformed Mason’s Island from neglected, overgrown farmland into Theodore Roosevelt Island, a memorial to America’s 26th president. They conceived a 'real forest' designed to mimic the natural forest that once covered the island. Today miles of trails through wooded uplands and swampy bottomlands honor the legacy of a great outdoorsman and conservationist."

A small island, Little Island, lies just off the southern tip; Georgetown and the John F. Kennedy Center for the Performing Arts are respectively across the main channel of the Potomac to the north and the east.

== History ==
=== Early history ===
The Nacotchtank Indians, formerly of what is now Anacostia (in Washington, D.C.), temporarily moved to the island in 1668, giving its first recorded name, "Anacostine". The island was patented in 1682 as Analostan or Barbadoes Island by Captain Randolph Brandt (or Brunett), who left the island to his daughter Margaret Hammersley, upon his death in 1698 or 1699. Historical records indicate that the Nacotchtank were living on the island in 1711, but by 1751 they went unmentioned and appeared to be a "lost tribe", likely having merged with nearby tribes such as the Piscataway.

=== Mason, Carter, and Bradley families ===
The island was acquired by George Mason III in 1724. George Mason IV (then underage) inherited the island in 1735 upon the death of his father, and a ferry from the Virginia shore across the Potomac to Georgetown (the "Little River" and mouth of Rock Creek) was moved from Awbrey's land to Mason's island in 1748. His son and executor John Mason, inherited the island as the century ended, pursuant to a 1773 will presented to the Fairfax County Circuit court in 1792 by his brother George Mason V, who died in 1796 so he and his other living brother, Thomas Mason, succeeded as their father's executors.

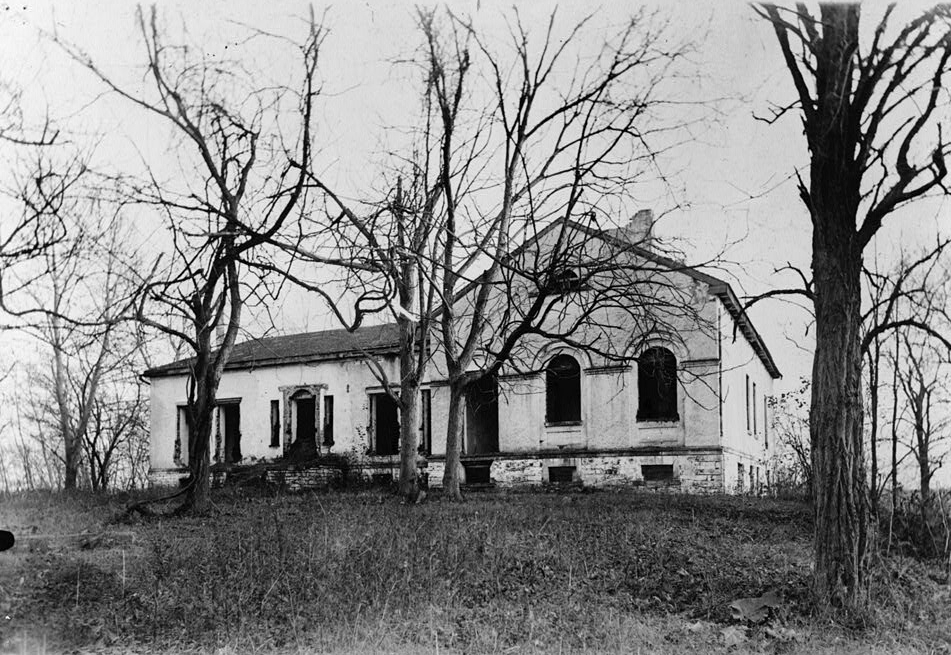
The Mason House in the 19th century

John Mason built a mansion on the island around 1796 and planted crops for sale as well as gardens. The home was built and estate maintained with free black and slave labor. He was an active member of the Agricultural Society of Georgetown and the Columbia Agricultural Society of Washington, and able to manufacture almost everything needed for home consumption (including cotton) on the island. He also entertained lavishly on the island, including a 1798 party to honor then-uncrowned Louis Philippe I, and an 1811 fete for his son John Murray Mason before he left to study in Paris. In 1809 John Mason secured a charter for a turnpike to connect his ferry landing with the Washington-Alexandria turnpike that Congress had chartered the previous year (and which would follow what became U.S. Route 1 and compete with his ferry for traffic). John Mason also diversified his income-producing activities, operating a ferry between Georgetown and the Virginia shore until construction of the Aqueduct Bridge in 1843 (superseded by the Key Bridge in 1923), as well as from 1817 until 1838 serving as the last president of the Potowmack Company (founded in 1774 with George Washington as its first President and in order to deepen the Potomac's channel and build locks around the principal falls).

Using federal funds and private funds raised by Georgetown merchants, a causeway from the Virginia shore to the island was constructed after debris from flooding in the winter of 1784 changed the Potomac River's main channel from the island's western side to the eastern side and increased silt which threatened the nearby Georgetown port. Alexandria merchants objected to the causeway and it proved a sticking point in their calls for retrocession of 26 square miles of land Virginia had given to establish the federal city as the century began. The first retrocession attempt was in 1804, and another major failed attempt occurred in 1824. However, by 1831, water stagnation caused the Mason family to move from the island. (Through his ownership, John Mason, who opposed retrocession, also had a Georgetown residence at the corner of 25th Street, L Street and Pennsylvania Avenue, which became the site of Columbia Hospital in 1932). In 1842, then elderly John Mason sold the island to John Carter. Four years later, Congress left retrocession to a referendum, which President James K. Polk authorized and Alexandria voters endorsed by a 763 to 222 vote on September 1, 1846 (despite opposition from the northern areas). After a further year of Congressional and Virginia General Assembly negotiations, the island became part of Alexandria County (the northern portion later separated from the City of Alexandria and was renamed Arlington County). After Carter died in 1851, the island passed to William A. Bradley. Nonetheless, in 1854, the island again hosted an entertainment, this time given by the late John Mason's daughter Anna Maria (who had married Sydney Smith Lee in 1834) to mark a treaty opening Japan to foreign trade (Captain Lee having served under Commodore Matthew C. Perry on the voyage which resulted in the treaty).

=== American Civil War ===
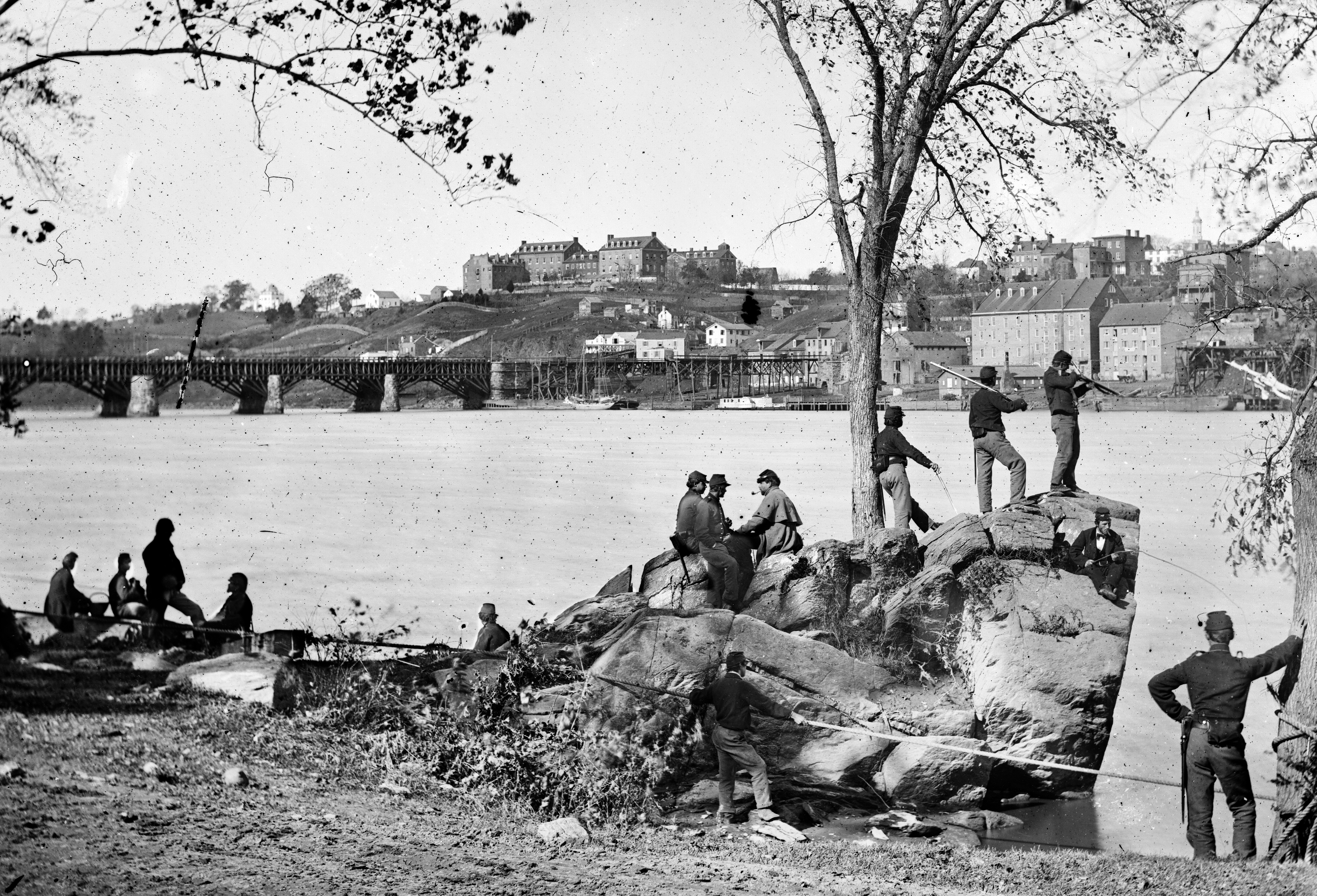
Union soldiers at Camp Greene on the island in 1861

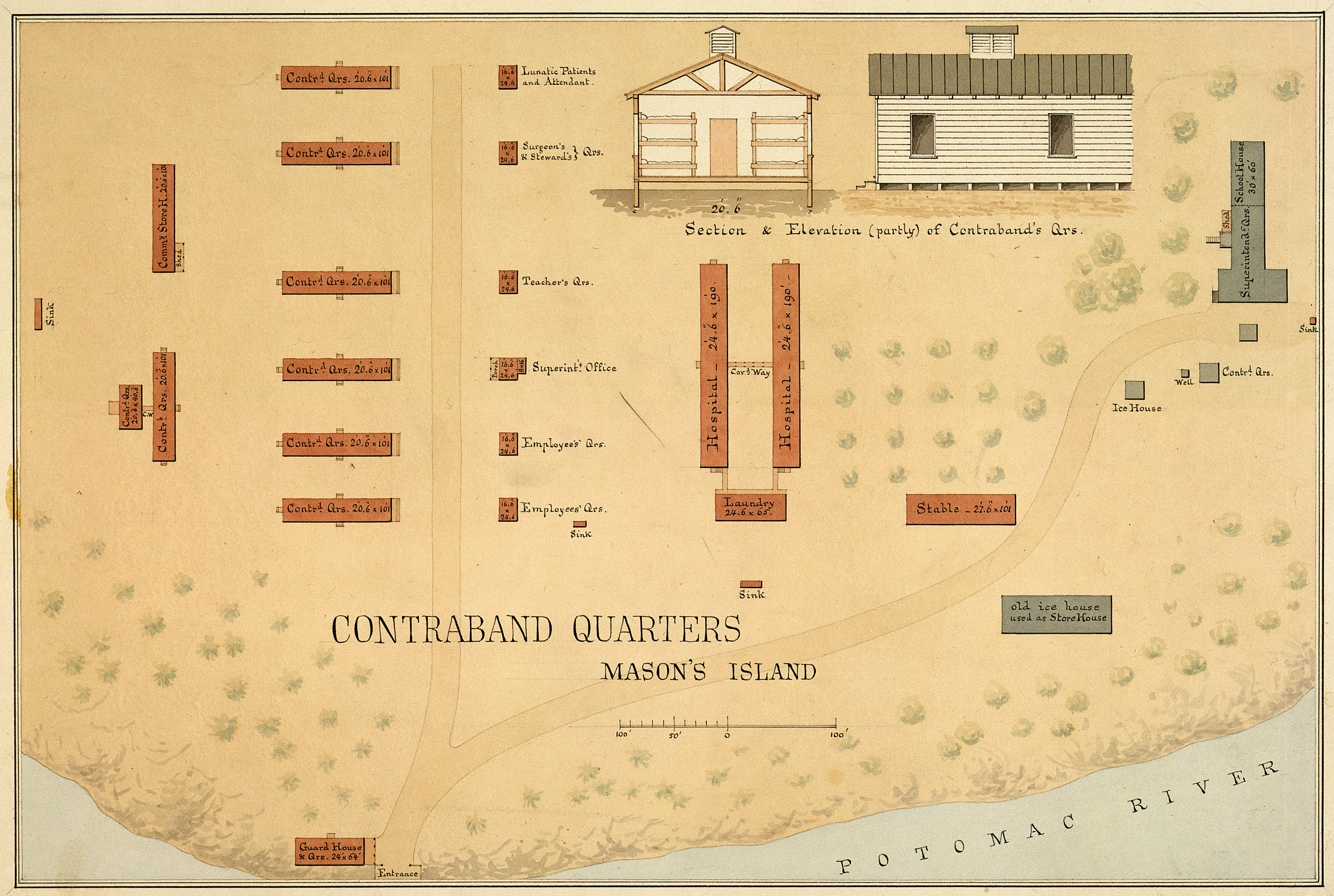
Contraband Quarters, Camp Greene

In 1861, Alexandria County had about 10,000 residents, three-quarters of whom lived in the city portion, and about half of those in the country portion were enslaved or "free colored". Union forces occupied the island, Mason's former mansion, and the rest of the formerly retroceded area on the night of May 23–24, hours after Virginia voters ratified secession. Three federal units covered the three major trans-Potomac routes, and soon fortified the county as part of the military defenses of the nation's capital. Mason's Island soon became a U.S. Army training camp called Camp Greene. Following President Lincoln's decision to allow African Americans to join the U.S. Army, the 1st United States Colored Infantry used the island to train its soldiers. From 1864 to 1865, the camp housed as many as 1,200 formerly enslaved people, first under the authority of the U.S. Army, and later, the Freedmen's Bureau. Locals continued to call it "Mason's Island" until the memorial was built.

=== Test site and gas light company ===
Following the declaration of war against Spain in 1898, the island became a test site for a number of private experiments in electrical ignition of the explosives dynamite and joveite led by the chemist Charles Edward Munroe of Columbian University. Monroe's experiments, which explored the use of the explosives for mining waterways and roadways and preparing ground for rapid entrenchment, were conducted in secret and without alerting the District of Columbia Police Department, which investigated citizens' reports of Spanish spy activity and found the explosives and detonators buried on the island.

From 1913 to 1931, Washington Gas Light Company owned the island, and allowed vegetation to grow unchecked on the island.

=== National memorial ===
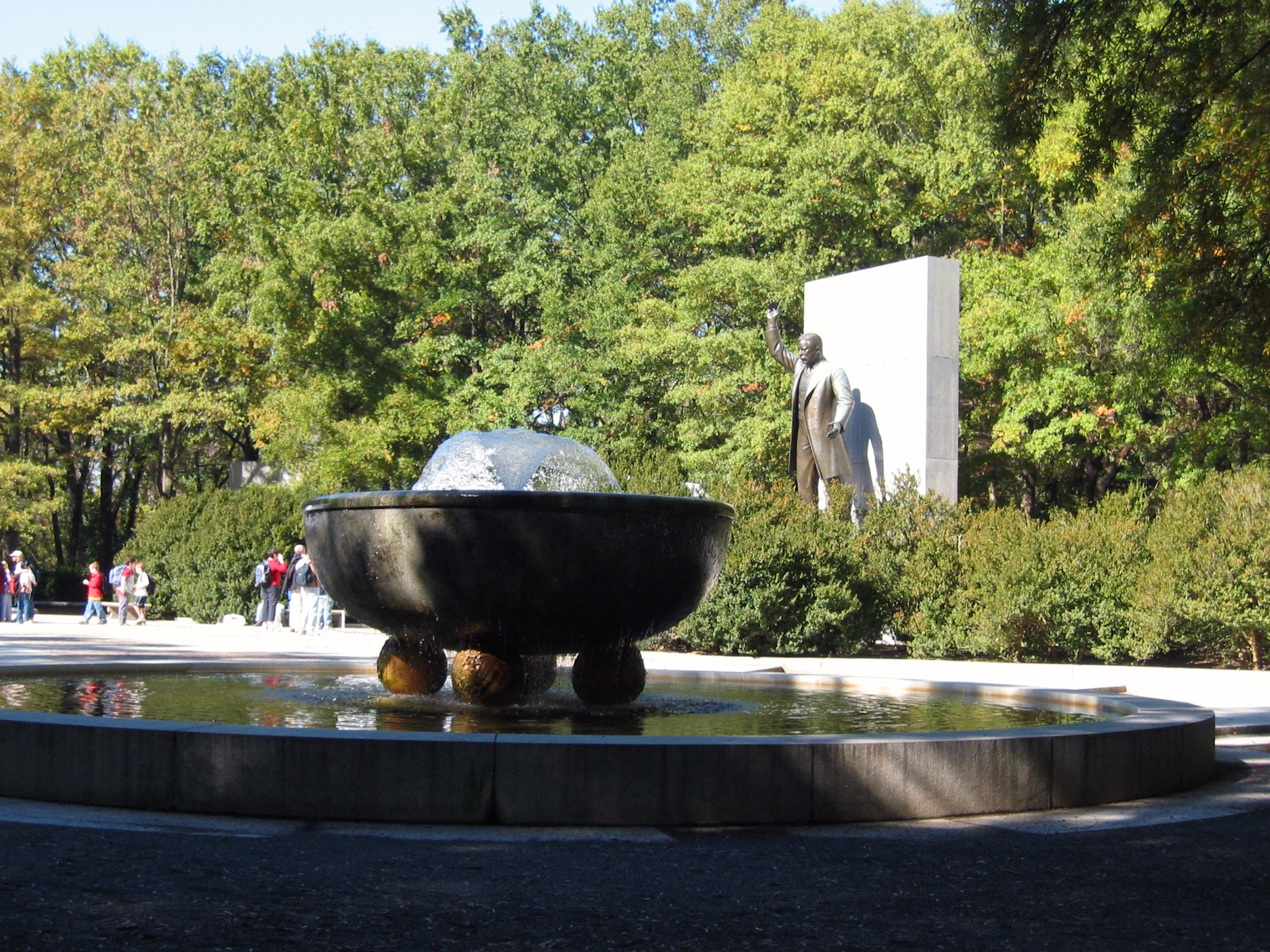
The fountain and the statue in the background

In 1931, the Theodore Roosevelt Memorial Association purchased the island from the gas company with the intention of erecting a memorial honoring Roosevelt. On Dec 12, 1932 in a ceremony in the east room of the White House, President Hoover accepted the island as a shrine to Roosevelt and declared that would be known as Theodore Roosevelt Island. Congress authorized the memorial on May 21, 1932, but did not appropriate funds for the memorial for almost three decades.

Frederick Law Olmsted Jr., a landscape architect known for his wildlife conservation efforts, as well as designs for the National Mall and other areas in the National Capital area (and whom President Theodore Roosevelt had appointed to the McMillan Commission back in 1901), developed a plan for the island. By 1935, the Civilian Conservation Corps had cleared much of the island and pulled down the house's remaining walls; today, only part of the mansion's foundation remains.

Funds were finally designated by Congress in 1960. As with all historic areas administered by the National Park Service, the national memorial is listed on the National Register of Historic Places; the listing first appeared on October 15, 1966.

The memorial was dedicated on October 27, 1967. Designed by Eric Gugler, the memorial includes a 17-foot (5.2 m) statue by sculptor Paul Manship, four large stone monoliths with some of Roosevelt's more famous quotations, and two large fountains.

== Geography and natural history ==
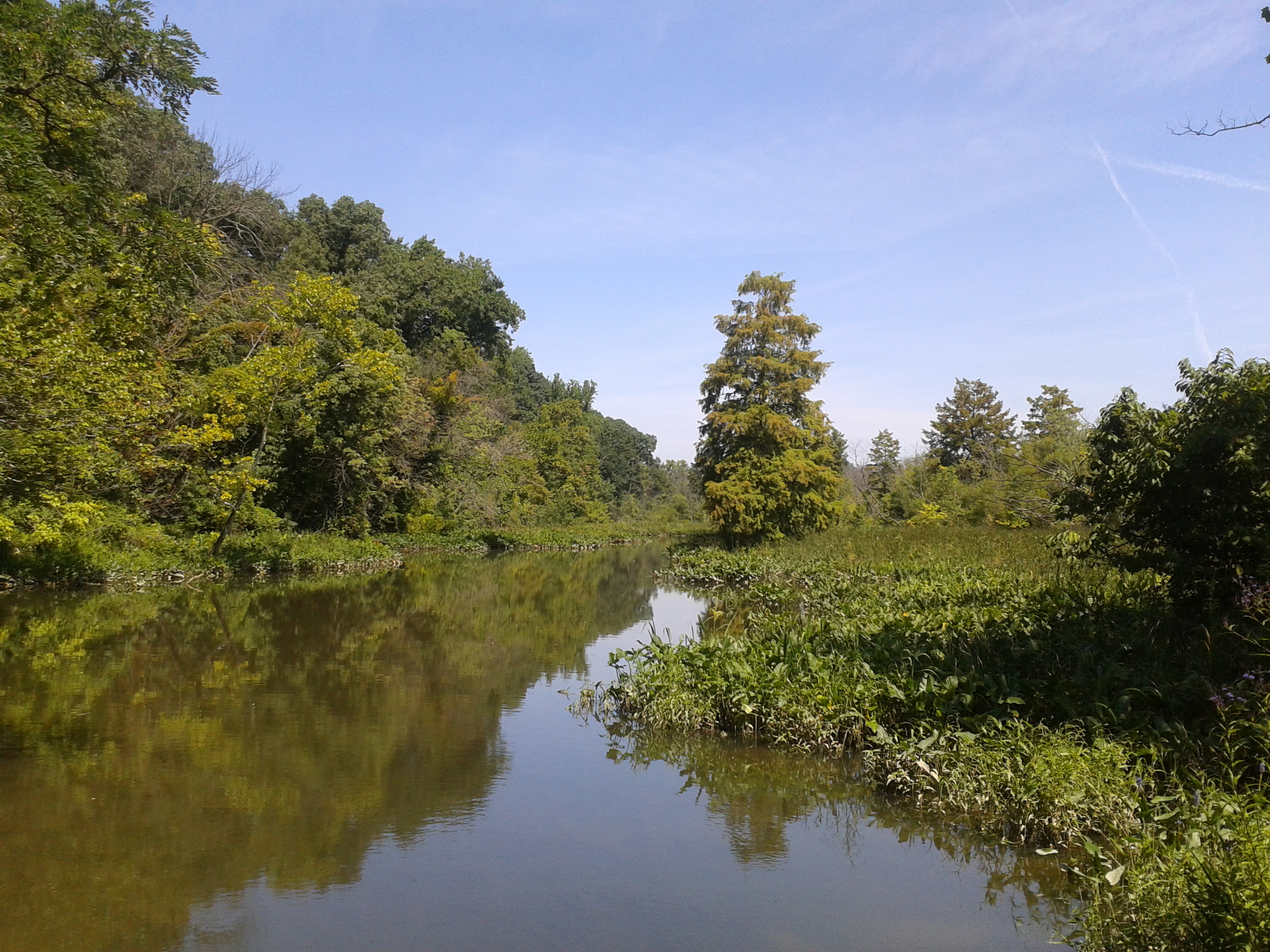
A portion of the island is a marsh.

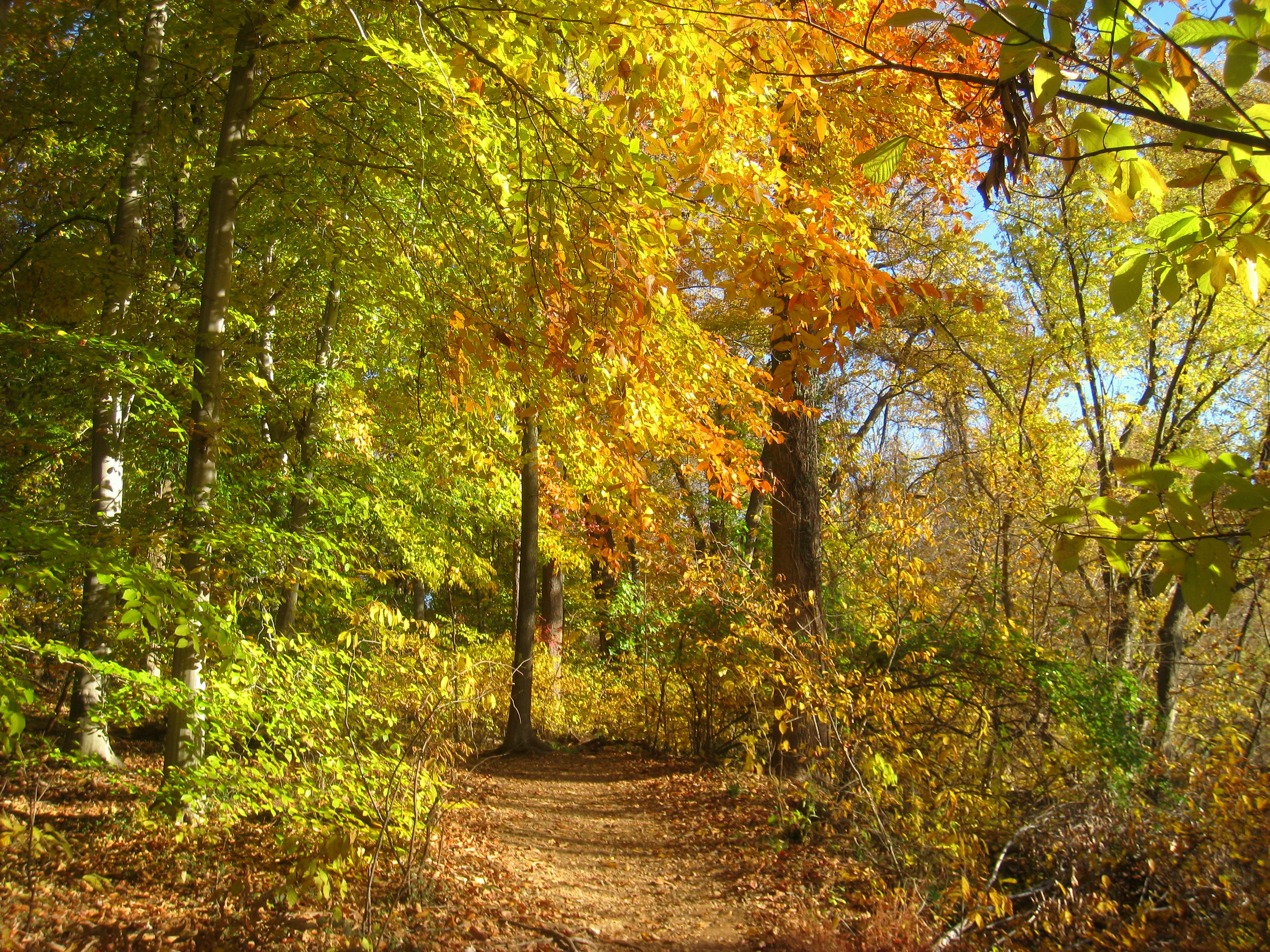
The island in autumn.

The Potomac River surrounding the island is at sea level, part of the Chesapeake Bay estuary, with the river water fresh but tidal. A narrow channel, unofficially referred to as "Little River" by local users of the Potomac River, separates the island from the Virginia bank of the Potomac, with the main channel of the Potomac between the island and Georgetown, part of Washington, D.C. Surrounding scenery includes the Potomac Gorge and Key Bridge, Georgetown, Rosslyn, and the Kennedy Center. The Virginia state line follows the southern bank of the river, so, despite the fact that the primary access to the island is from Virginia, the island itself is entirely in the District of Columbia.

The rocky western (upriver) and central portions of the island are part of the Piedmont Plateau, while the southeastern part is within the Atlantic Coastal Plain. At one point opposite Georgetown, the Atlantic Seaboard fall line between the Piedmont and the Coastal Plain can be seen as a natural phenomenon. The island has about 2.5-mile (4.0 km) of shoreline, and the highest area of the island (where the Mason mansion stood) is about 44 feet (13 m) above sea level.

Spring floods coming down the Potomac from Appalachia inundate low-lying portions of island's shores regularly, usually several times each year, while much larger floods, often from the storm surges and intense, widespread rainfall from coastal hurricanes and tropical storms, flood the island more deeply several times a century.

The island's vegetation is quite diverse for a relatively small area, due to its geological and topographic variety, the frequency of floods, its land-use history (including various periods of landscaping), and its location in an urban area in which many non-native species occur. Most of the island is deciduous forest of various kinds, including uplands, riparian shores, and swamps. There is also an area of fresh-water tidal (estuarine) marsh, and a few small bedrock outcrops of metamorphic Piedmont rock, some along the tidal shore. The variety of freshwater estuarine intertidal habitats along the island's shores is particularly notable.

The island is particularly known for its variety of birds and its showy displays of spring wildflowers. However, dozens of non-native invasive plants have become abundant there, often outcompeting the native species.

== Access ==
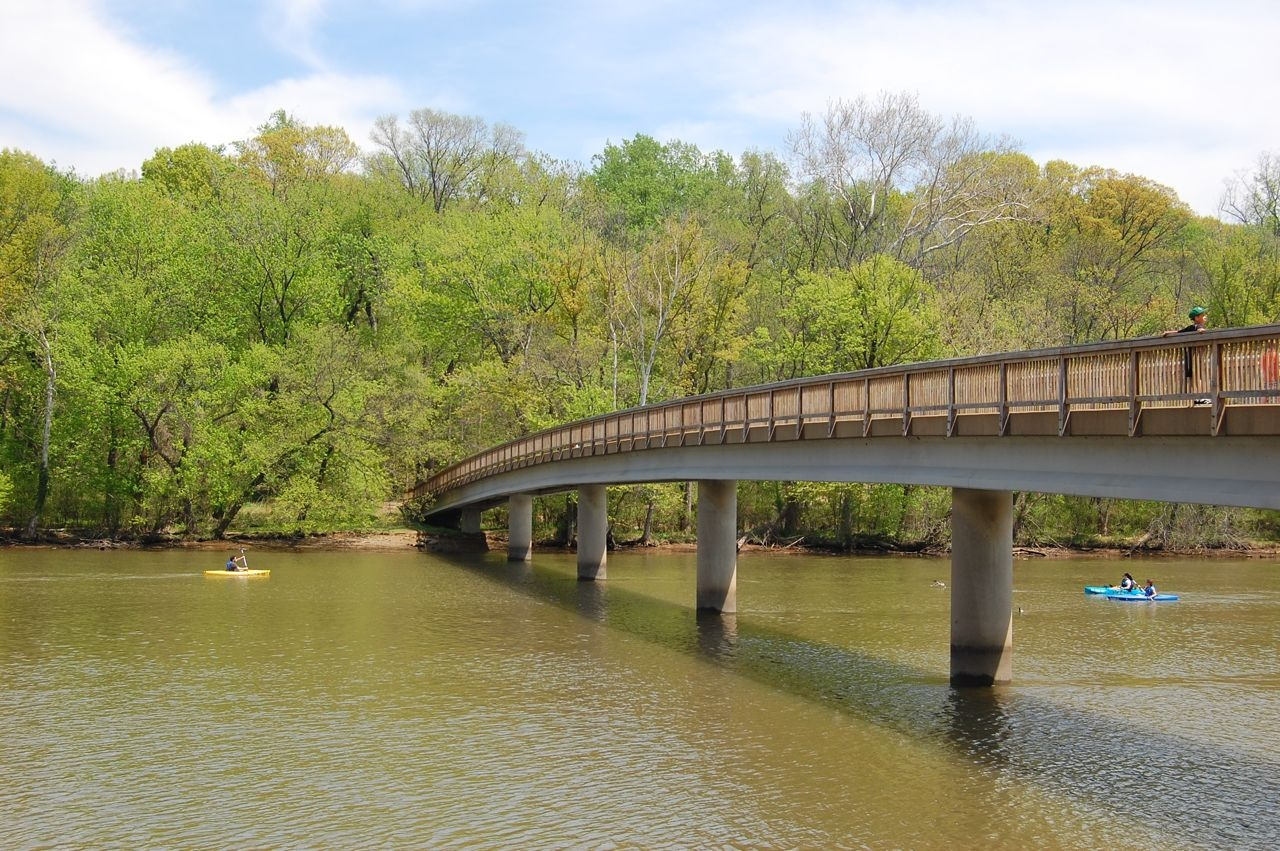
The footbridge to the island

Theodore Roosevelt Island is accessible by a footbridge from a parking lot along the Virginia bank of the Potomac River, just north of the Theodore Roosevelt Bridge, which crosses but does not allow access to the island. Cars can enter this parking lot only from the northbound lanes of the George Washington Memorial Parkway.

Pedestrians can reach the parking lot and footbridge by following the Mount Vernon Trail south from the intersection of Langston Boulevard and North Lynn Street in Rosslyn, near Key Bridge. The closest Washington Metro station to the island is the Rosslyn station.

Several hiking trails provide access to the memorial and a variety of the island's natural habitats, including a boardwalk through a swampy and marshy area.

== In popular culture ==
- A story by Ernest Seton Thompson "The Royal Analostan" mentions the island as the origin of the fictional cat breed.
- The 2014 movie Captain America: The Winter Soldier depicted Little Island as the site of the Triskelion, the headquarters of the fictional S.H.I.E.L.D. spy agency.
- In 2019 video game Tom Clancy's The Division 2 the island was the site of a failed quarantine effort after the outbreak of a manufactured epidemic disease. The citizens quarantined on the island radicalized into a group called the "Outcasts", one of the game's major antagonist factions.

== See also ==
- List of national memorials of the United States
- List of islands of the United States
- List of islands on the Potomac River
- List of sculptures of presidents of the United States
- Presidential memorials in the United States
