= Passapatanzy Creek =

Coordinates: 38.328499°N 77.273723°W

Passapatanzy Creek is a tidal tributary of the Potomac River in King George County, Virginia, United States.

== Nomenclature ==
The United States Board on Geographic Names officially decided upon the creek's name in 1940. Before the official naming decision, Passapatanzy Creek was also alternatively known as Paspatansy Creek, Paspetanke River, and Paspotansie Creek.

== See also ==
- List of rivers of Virginia
