= Theodore Roosevelt Bridge =

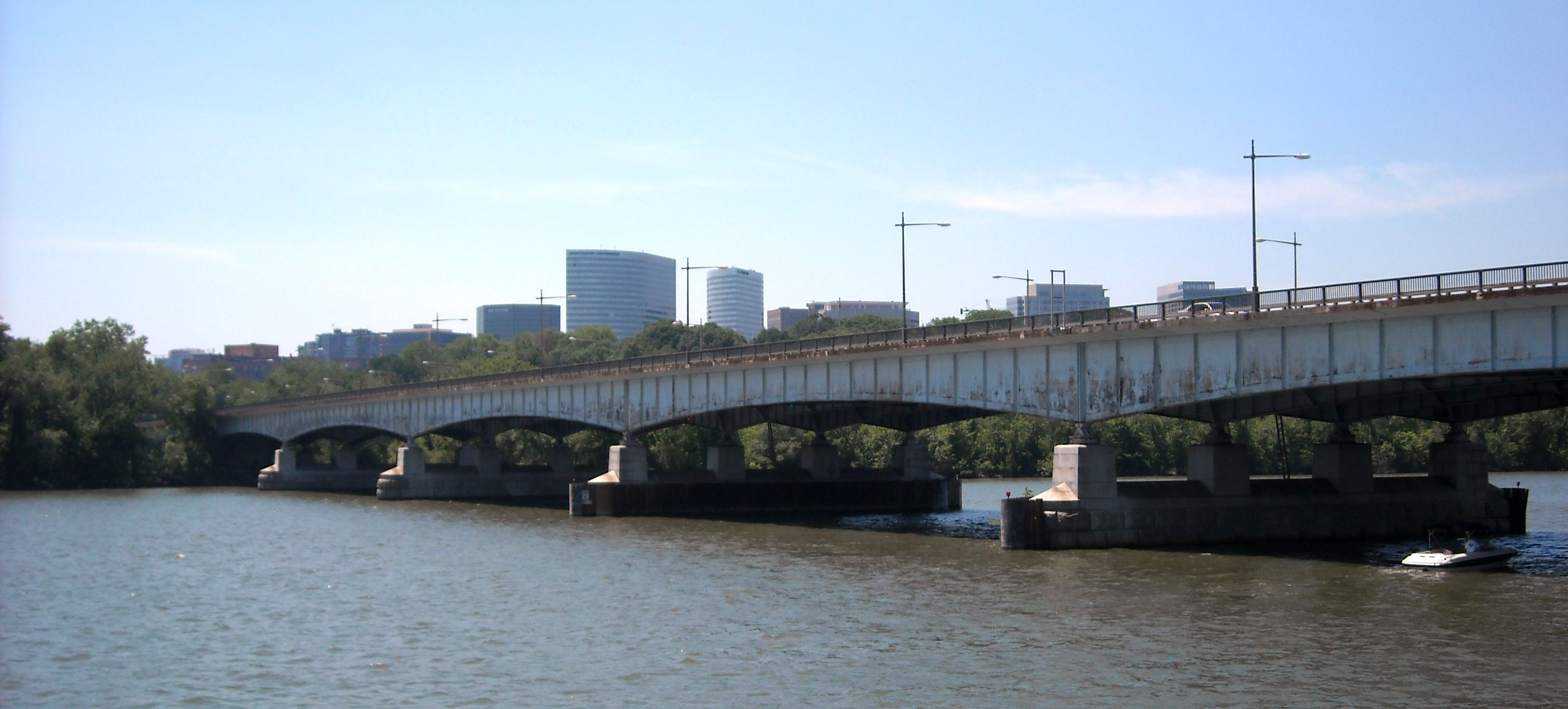
- Theodore Roosevelt Bridge in 2008
- Coordinates: 38°53′33″N 77°03′27″W
- Carries: 7 lanes (1 reversible) of I-66 / US 50
- Crosses: Potomac River
- Locale: Washington, D.C. and the Rosslyn section of Arlington, Virginia
- Other name(s): Teddy Roosevelt Bridge, Roosevelt Bridge

Characteristics
- Design: Girder
- Material: Steel, Concrete

History
- Opened: June 23, 1964; 62 years ago

Statistics
- Daily traffic: 95,000 (2026)

Location
- Interactive map of Theodore Roosevelt Bridge

The Theodore Roosevelt Bridge (also known as the Teddy Roosevelt Bridge, Roosevelt Bridge, or T.R. Bridge) is a bridge crossing the Potomac River which connects Washington, D.C., with the Commonwealth of Virginia. The bridge crosses over Theodore Roosevelt Island, and carries Interstate 66/U.S. Route 50. The center lane in the bridge is reversible; the middle barrier is moved with a barrier transfer machine. It's operated eastbound during the morning rush hour from 6-11 am. The bridge is named in honor of Theodore Roosevelt, the 26th President of the United States.

== History ==
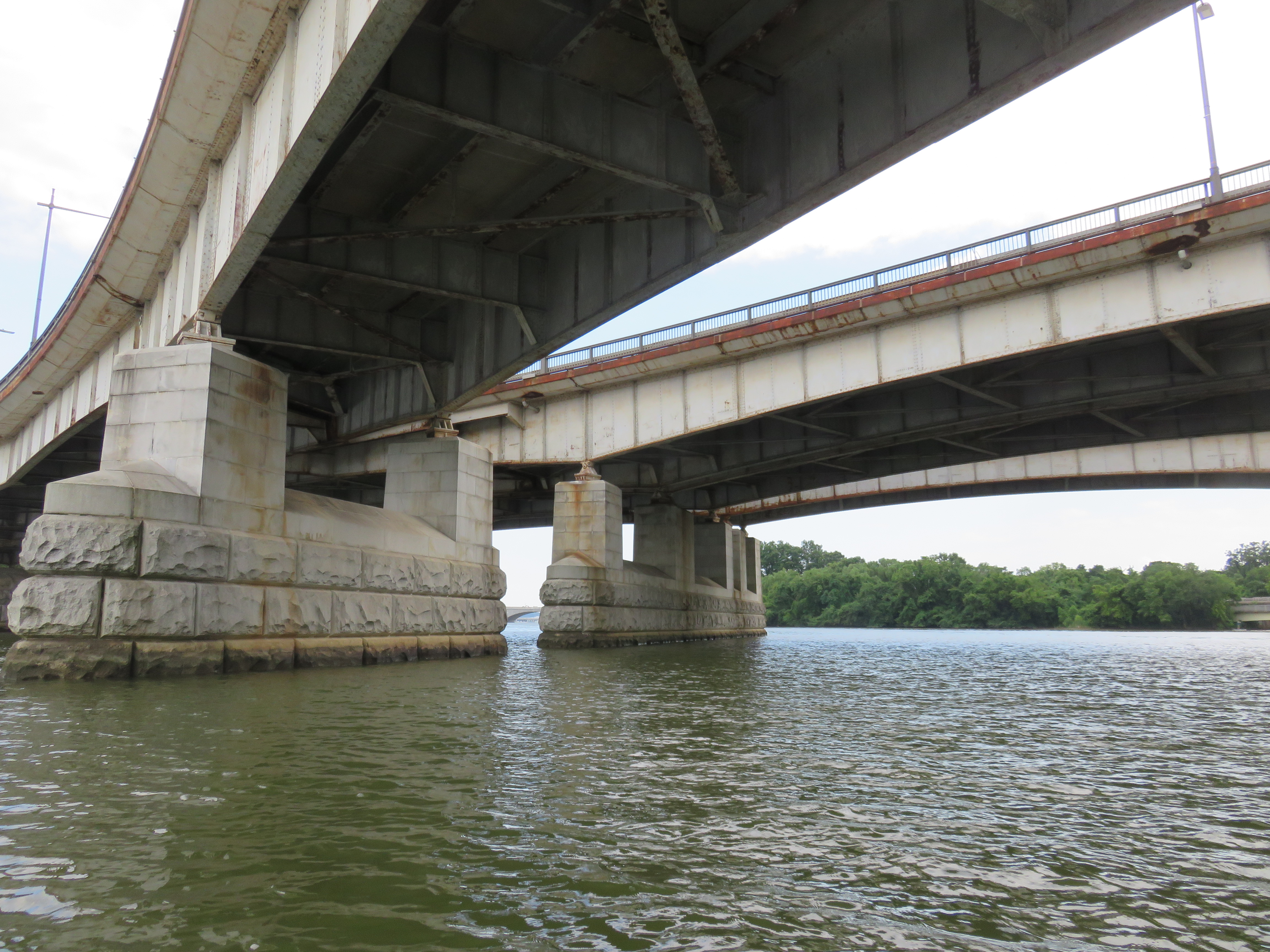
Underside of the bridge west of Theodore Roosevelt Island

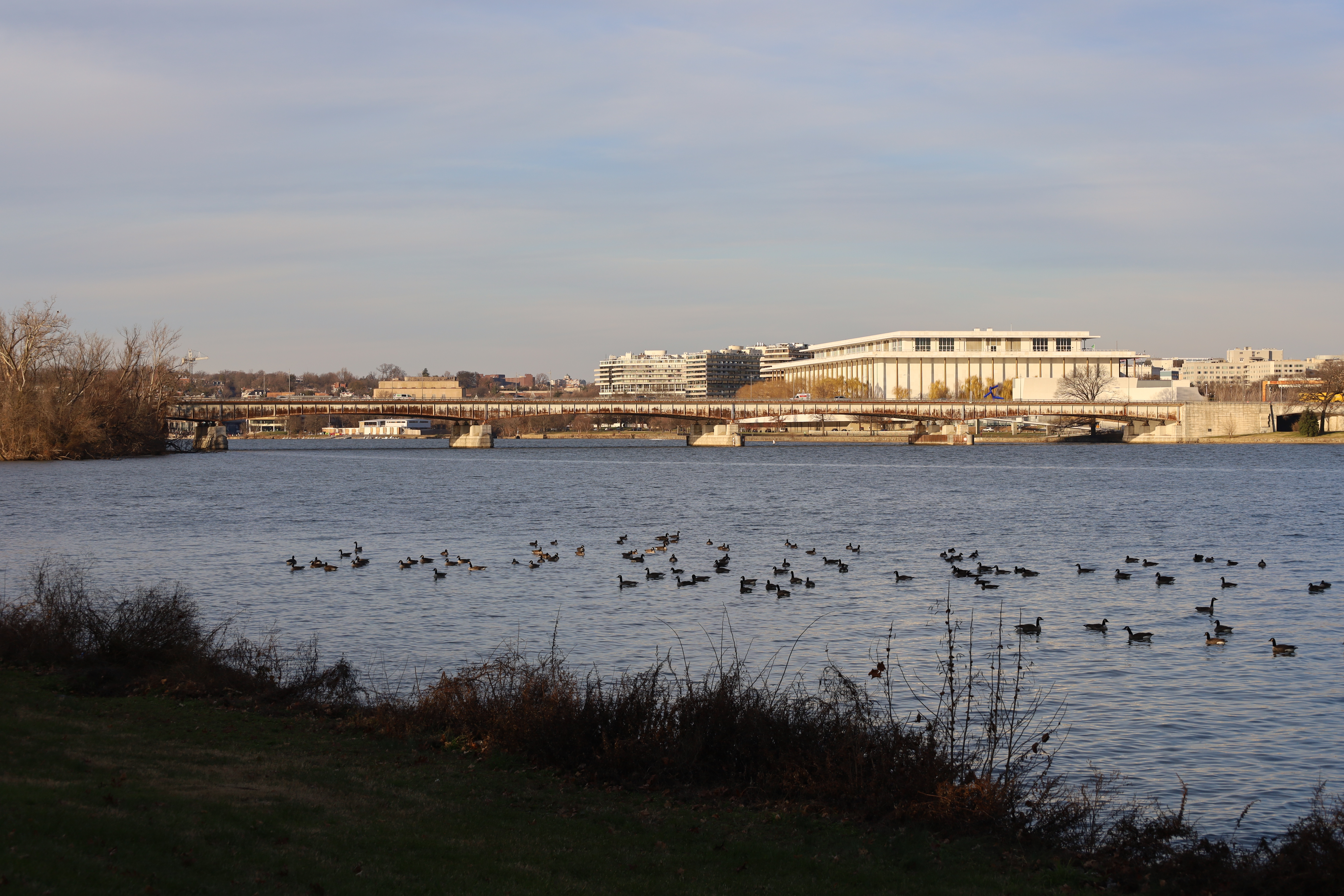
The bridge with the Kennedy Center and the Watergate complex in the background

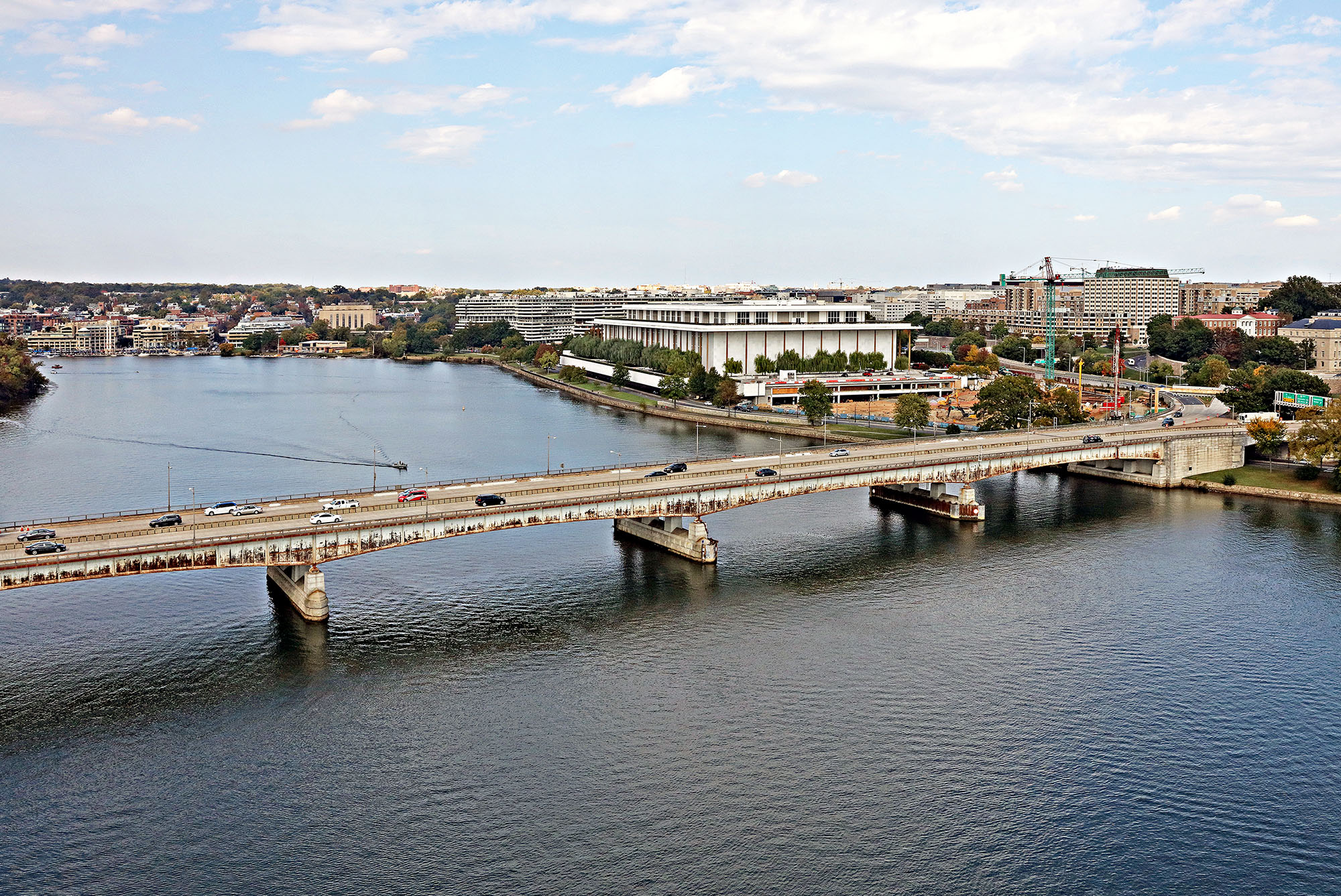
Theodore Roosevelt Bridge looking North

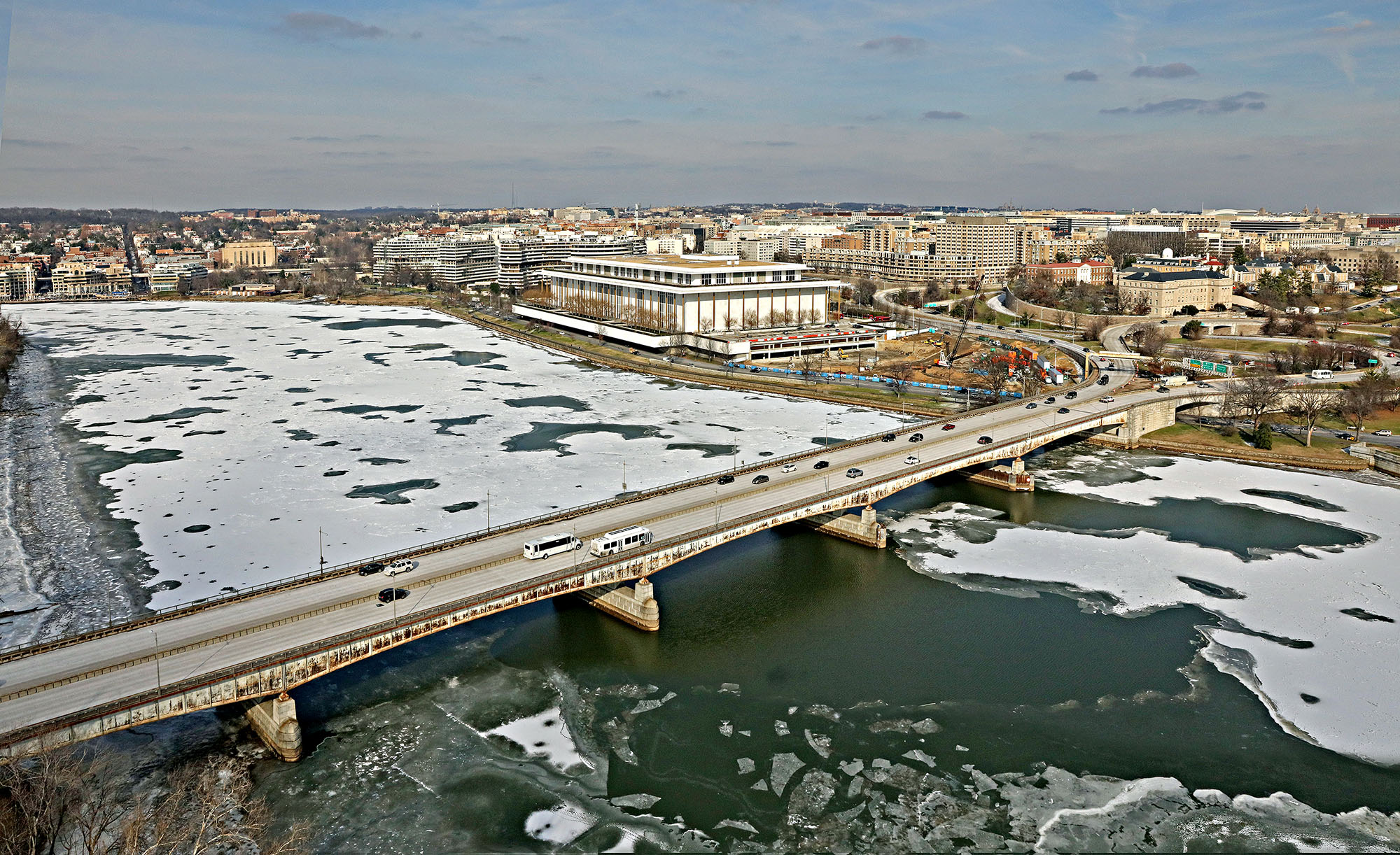
Theodore Roosevelt Bridge looking North from Virginia with the Potomac River iced over.

Plans for a new bridge across the Potomac River began circulating in the early 1950s. A bridge was first proposed (across Theodore Roosevelt Island, as it happened) in 1952, although at that time the bridge was to have linked with the E Street Expressway. The Theodore Roosevelt Memorial Association (later renamed the Theodore Roosevelt Association, or TRA), which owned the island vigorously opposed any bridge across its land. In July 1954, various government agencies and members of Congress came together to propose a bridge connecting to Constitution Avenue NW (although debate continued and numerous unsuccessful proposals were made to move the bridge to other locations over the next four years). Less clear was where the bridge would land on the Virginia side of the river. Five locations for the crossing were considered. In order of preference, they were: 1) South of Little Island, 2) Over the northern end of Theodore Roosevelt Island, 3) Over Little Island, 4) Over the center of Theodore Roosevelt Island, and 5) Over the southern end of Theodore Roosevelt Island.

TRA president Frank Ross McCoy, a vocal opponent of the bridge, died in 1954, weakening the TRA's bargaining position. In July 1955, the association agreed to allow the federal government to use the southern end of Theodore Roosevelt Island. The United States Commission of Fine Arts approved a steel bridge design in December 1955.

President Dwight Eisenhower signed legislation authorizing the bridge on June 4, 1958. This legislation designated the bridge for the first time as the "Theodore Roosevelt Bridge". Construction of the bridge began in 1960, and it opened on June 23, 1964.

=== Rehabilitation ===
Theodore Roosevelt Bridge underwent minor rehabilitation work overseen by the District of Columbia Department of Transportation (DDOT) in 2013. After this work, DDOT inspected the bridge in 2014 and discovered additional need for repair. Due to heavy funding needs to replace or repair other bridges in the city, DDOT pushed the date for these repairs to 2021. Deteriorated steel beams were discovered in February 2022, which led to emergency work on the bridge for nine months.

Rehabilitation construction began in May 2025. The project aims to replace the bridge deck and off-ramps, and expand its sidewalk.

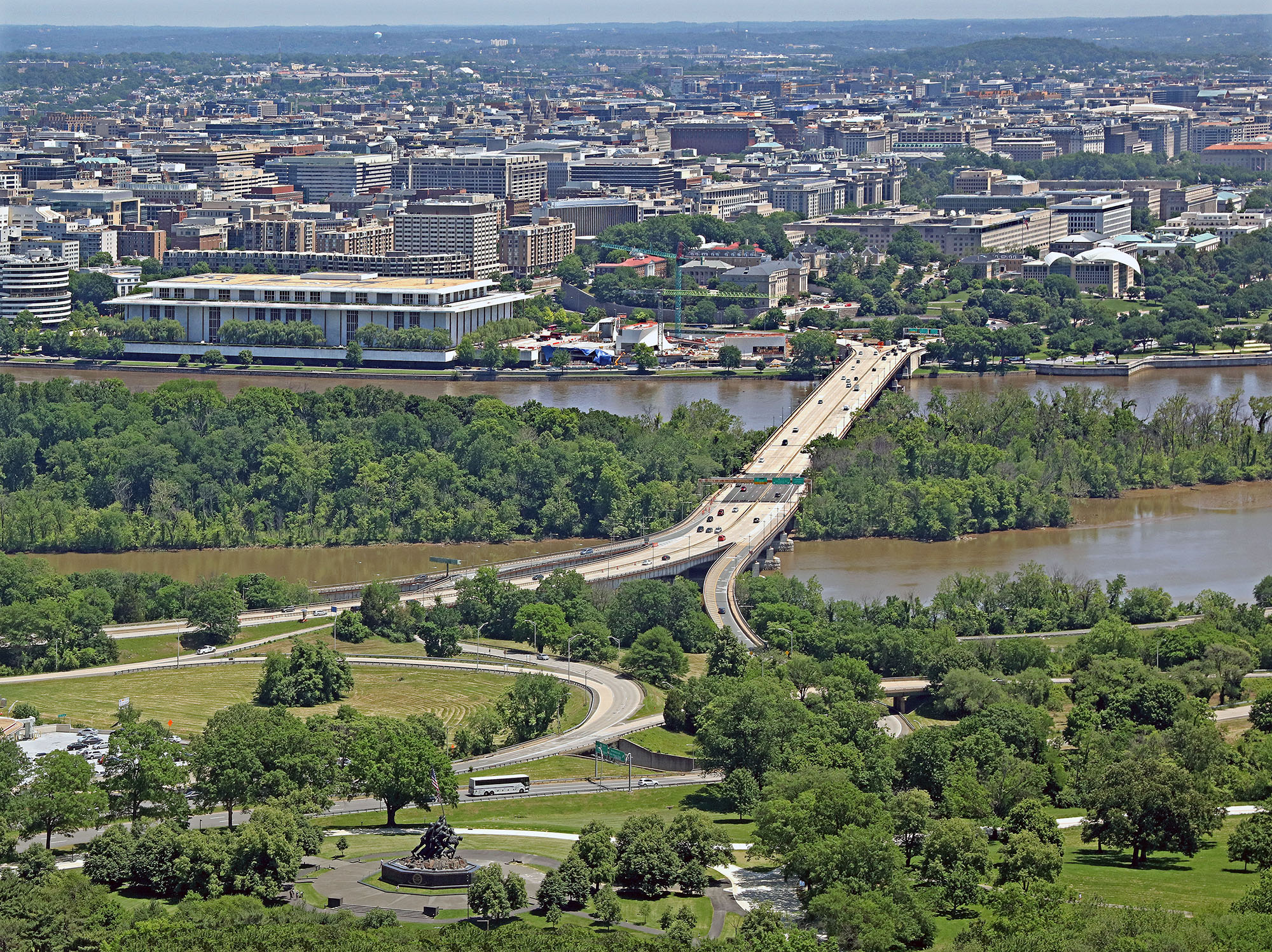
Theodore Roosevelt Bridge looking northeast from Virginia

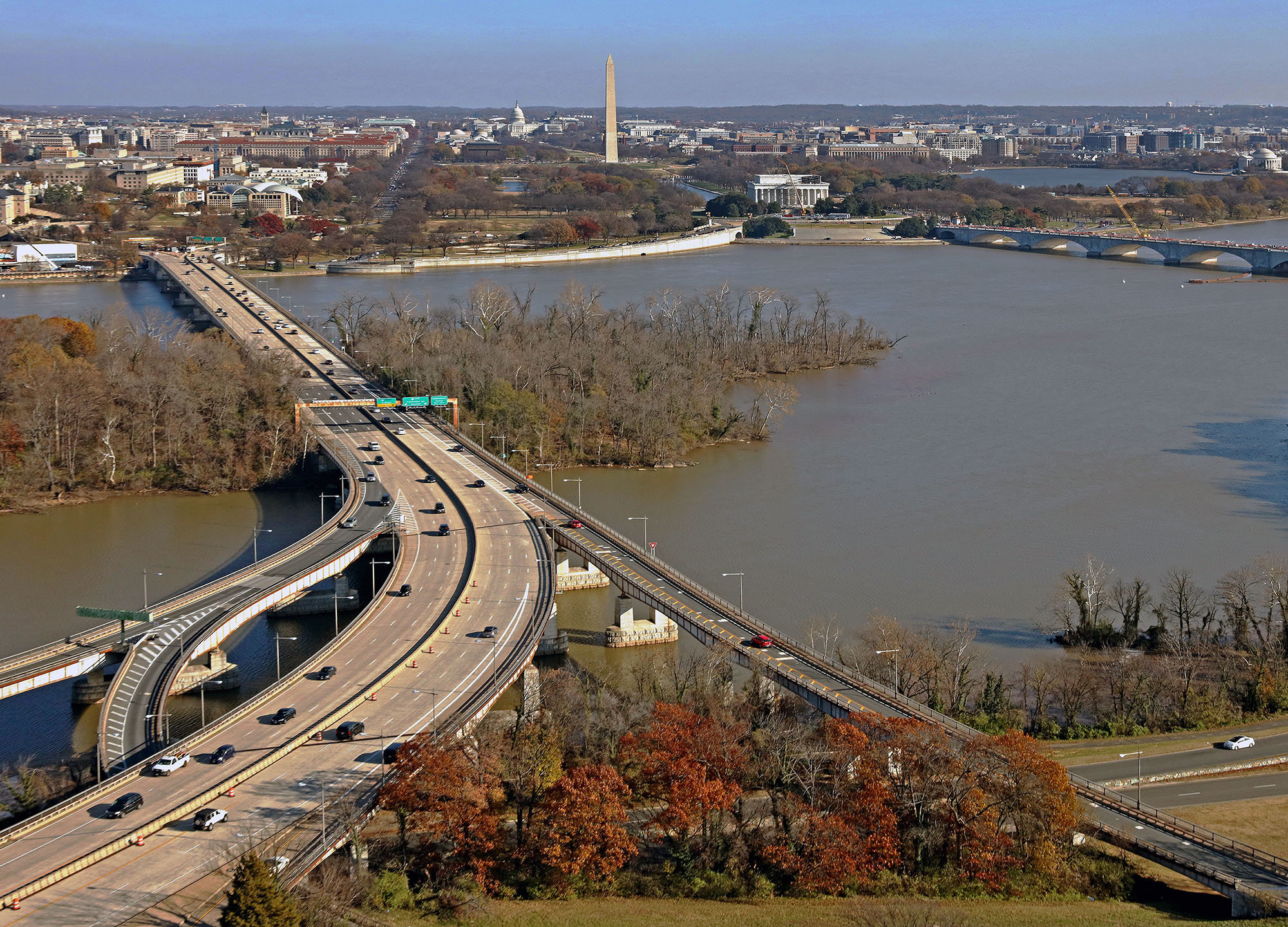
Theodore Roosevelt Bridge looking southeast from Virginia

== See also ==
- List of crossings of the Potomac River
