= 1st United States Colored Infantry Regiment =

Civil War era military unit

- Active: May 19, 1863 – September 29, 1865
- Disbanded: September 29, 1865
- Country: United States
- Allegiance: Union
- Branch: Infantry
- Size: Regiment
- Engagements: American Civil War: Siege of Petersburg; Battle of Chaffin's Farm; Battle of Fair Oaks & Darbytown Road; Second Battle of Fort Fisher; Carolinas campaign

Commanders
- Colonel: John H. Holman

The 1st United States Colored Infantry Regiment was an infantry regiment that served in the Union Army during the American Civil War. The regiment was composed of African American enlisted men commanded by white officers and was authorized by the Bureau of Colored Troops which was created by the United States War Department on May 22, 1863.

== Service ==
The 1st United States Colored Infantry Regiment was organized at Washington, D.C. beginning May 19, 1863 and mustered in June 30, 1863. They soon received a regimental flag described as: “The Goddess of Liberty stands with her feet on a snake which is biting itself to death. In one hand she holds the President's Proclamation of freedom; in the other a musket, which the offers to a bareheaded and dusky freedman.”

The regiment was attached to United States Forces, Norfolk and Portsmouth, Department of Virginia and North Carolina, July to October 1863. United States Forces, Yorktown, Virginia, Department of Virginia and North Carolina, to April 1864. 1st Brigade, Hincks' Colored Division, XVIII Corps, Army of the James, Department of Virginia and North Carolina, to June 1864. 1st Brigade, 3rd Division, XVIII Corps, to December 1864. 1st Brigade, 1st Division, XV Corps, to December 1864. 1st Brigade, 3rd Division, XXV Corps, to March 1865. 1st Brigade, 3rd Division, X Corps, Department of North Carolina, to August 1865. Department of North Carolina to September 1865.

The 1st U.S. Colored Infantry mustered out of service September 29, 1865.

== Detailed service ==
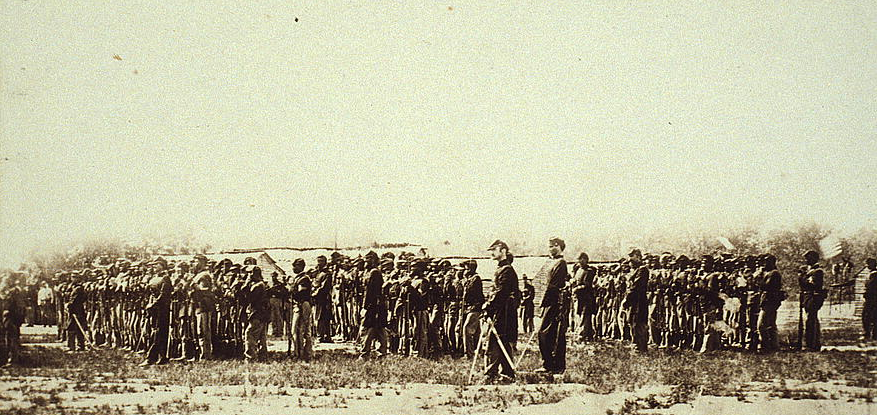
1st Regiment USCT on review

After its formation the regiment saw duty at Norfolk, Portsmouth and Yorktown in Virginia until April 1864. It then went on an expedition from Norfolk to South Mills, Camden Court House, N.C. from December 5 to December 24, 1863. Butler's operations south of the James River and against Petersburg and Richmond, Va., May 4 – June 15. Action at Wilson's Wharf May 24. Assaults on Petersburg June 15–18. Siege of Petersburg and Richmond June 16 to December 7, 1864. Explosion of Mine, Petersburg, July 30. Demonstration on the north side of the James River September 28–30. Battle of Chaffin's Farm, New Market Heights, September 28–30. Fort Harrison September 29. Battle of Fair Oaks October 27–28. Expedition to Fort Fisher, N.C., December 7–27. Second Expedition to Fort Fisher, N.C., January 7–15, 1865. Assault on and capture of Fort Fisher January 15. Sugar Loaf Hill January 19. Sugar Loaf Battery February 11. Fort Anderson February 18–20. Capture of Wilmington February 22. Northeast Ferry February 22. Carolinas Campaign March 1 – April 26. Advance on Goldsboro March 6–21. Occupation of Goldsboro March 21. Cox's Bridge March 23–24. Advance on Raleigh April 9–13. Occupation of Raleigh April 13. Bennett's House April 26. Surrender of Johnston and his army. Duty in the Department of North Carolina until September.

== Casualties ==
The regiment lost a total of 185 men during service; 4 officers and 67 enlisted men killed or mortally wounded, 1 officer and 113 enlisted men died of disease.

== See also ==
- List of United States Colored Troops Civil War Units
- United States Colored Troops
- William Gould (W.G.) Raymond
