= National Register of Historic Places listings in Greene County, Georgia =

location of Greene County in Georgia

This is a list of properties and districts in Greene County, Georgia that are listed on the National Register of Historic Places (NRHP).

This National Park Service list is complete through NPS recent listings posted March 21, 2025.

== Current listings ==
	Name on the Register	Image	Date listed	Location	City or town	Description
1	Dr. Calvin M. Baber House	Dr. Calvin M. Baber House	December 17, 1987 (#87001439)	Penfield Rd. 33°35′04″N 83°10′26″W	Greensboro	
2	Bethesda Baptist Church and Cemetery	Bethesda Baptist Church and Cemetery	August 6, 1998 (#98000967)	Jct. of Cty Rd. 120 and Cty Rd. 129; 33°39′07″N 83°00′36″W	Union Point	
3	Brown-Bryson Farm		June 10, 1999 (#99000693)	1760 Siloam-Veazey Rd. 33°31′43″N 83°06′11″W	Siloam	
4	Church of the Redeemer	Church of the Redeemer	September 9, 1987 (#87001440)	Jct. of Main and North Sts. 33°34′42″N 83°10′56″W	Greensboro	
5	Copeland Site (9GE18)		May 19, 1989 (#89000373)	Address Restricted	Greensboro	
6	Early Hill Plantation	Early Hill Plantation	June 13, 1997 (#97000559)	Lickskillet Rd. 0.5 NE of US 278; 33°35′18″N 83°13′00″W	Greensboro	
7	Greene County Courthouse	Greene County Courthouse	September 18, 1980 (#80001083)	GA 12; 33°34′36″N 83°10′56″W	Greensboro	
8	Greensboro Commercial Historic District	Greensboro Commercial Historic District	November 6, 1987 (#87001438)	Broad and Main Sts. 33°34′33″N 83°10′56″W	Greensboro	
9	Greensboro Depot		September 9, 1987 (#87001441)	West St. 33°34′42″N 83°11′03″W	Greensboro	
10	Jefferson Hall	Jefferson Hall	August 10, 1989 (#89001100)	GA 12/U.S. Route 278; 33°36′12″N 83°02′24″W	Union Point	
11	Mary Leila Cotton Mill and Village	Mary Leila Cotton Mill and Village	September 9, 1987 (#87001443)	Roughly bounded by Cherry and Buffalo Sts. and Richland Ave., GA RR, Spring and Mill, and Mapple Sts. 33°34′47″N 83°11′14″W	Greensboro	
12	Moore-Crutchfield Place		April 12, 1990 (#90000549)	GA 15, SE of Siloam; 33°31′58″N 83°04′23″W	Siloam	
13	North Street-East Street Historic District	North Street-East Street Historic District	September 9, 1987 (#87001444)	North, East, Greene, and Walnut Sts. 33°34′41″N 83°10′44″W	Greensboro	
14	Penfield Historic District	Penfield Historic District	January 20, 1976 (#76000637)	7 mi. N of Greensboro on GA 5925; 33°40′07″N 83°10′11″W	Penfield	
15	Phillip Poullain House		September 9, 1987 (#87001448)	Penfield Rd. 33°35′05″N 83°10′41″W	Greensboro	
16	Peter W. Printup Plantation		September 5, 1985 (#85001977)	GA 44; 33°36′40″N 83°05′37″W	Union Point	
17	Siloam Historic District	Siloam Historic District	July 26, 2001 (#01000740)	Roughly centered on Main St., Union Point Hwy., and Church St. 33°32′05″N 83°04′55″W	Siloam	
18	Siloam Junior High School	Siloam Junior High School	February 20, 2002 (#02000036)	473 GA 15S; 33°31′55″N 83°04′34″W	Siloam	
19	South Street-Broad Street-Main Street-Laurel Street Historic District		September 9, 1987 (#87001450)	South, Broad, Main, and Laurel Sts. 33°34′26″N 83°11′14″W	Greensboro	
20	South Walnut Street Historic District		September 9, 1987 (#87001449)	S. Walnut, E. South, and E. Broad Sts. 33°34′24″N 83°10′48″W	Greensboro	
21	Springfield Baptist Church	Springfield Baptist Church	September 9, 1987 (#87001451)	Canaan Circle; 33°34′39″N 83°10′41″W	Greensboro	
22	Union Manufacturing Company		February 24, 1989 (#89000026)	500 Sibley Ave. 33°36′47″N 83°04′22″W	Union Point	
23	Union Point Historic District		January 7, 1991 (#90002100)	Roughly bounded by Lamb Ave., Washington Rd., Old Crawfordville Rd. and Hendry St. 33°37′01″N 83°04′27″W	Union Point	
24	Woodville Baptist Church and School	Woodville Baptist Church and School	April 15, 1999 (#99000455)	Jct. of E. Peachtree Ave. and Chestnut St. 33°40′14″N 83°06′00″W	Woodville	

== Former listings ==
	Name on the Register	Image	Date listed	Date removed	Location	City or town	Description
1	King-Knowles-Gheesling House		September 9, 1987 (#87001442)	February 6, 2020	North St. 33°34′42″N 83°10′58″W	Greensboro	
