= List of African-American historic places in Georgia =

This is a list of African American Historic Places in Georgia. This was originally based on a book by the National Park Service, The Preservation Press, the National Trust for Historic Preservation, and the National Conference of State Historic Preservation Officers, which may primarily have addressed sites that were listed, or were eligible for listing, on the National Register of Historic Places (NRHP). Historic sites might meet local or state criteria for listing in a historic register with or without meeting NRHP listing criteria.

A volunteer organization, the Georgia African American Historic Preservation Network (GAAHPN), has been active in preserving African American historic resources since 1989.

The state of Georgia's Historic Preservation Division has staff dedicated in this area since 2000. The program assists in preservation and, with GAAHPN, publishes Reflections, a periodical featuring African American historic sites and stories. HPD's program was the first established within any state historic preservation office.

Contents: Counties in Georgia with African American Historic Places
Baldwin - Bartow - Bibb - Burke - Camden - Calhoun - Clarke - Cobb - Dougherty - Effingham - Elbert - Floyd - Fulton - Glynn - Greene - Habersham - Hancock- Hart| - Jefferson - Liberty - Lowndes - Meriwether - Muscogee - Paulding - Randolph - Richmond - Thomas - Washington

Some of these sites are on the National Register of Historic Places (NR) as independent sites or as part of larger historic district. Several of the sites are National Historic Landmarks (NRL). Others have Georgia historical markers (HM). The citation on historical markers is given in the reference. The location listed is the nearest community to the site. More precise locations are given in the reference.

== Baldwin County ==
- Milledge
  - Westover

== Bartow County ==
- Cassville
  - Noble Hill School, a Rosenwald School

== Bibb County ==
- Macon
  - Douglass Theatre, in NRHP-listed Macon Historic District, founded in 1921 by Charles H. Douglass, an African American entrepreneur, to address absence of theatres accessible to African Americans Jim Crow era.
  - Fort Hill Historic District
  - Pleasant Hill Historic District
  - Bowden Golf Course

== Burke County ==
- Keysville
  - Hopeful Baptist Church

== Camden County ==
- St. Marys
  - High Point-Half Moon Bluff Historic District

== Chatham County ==
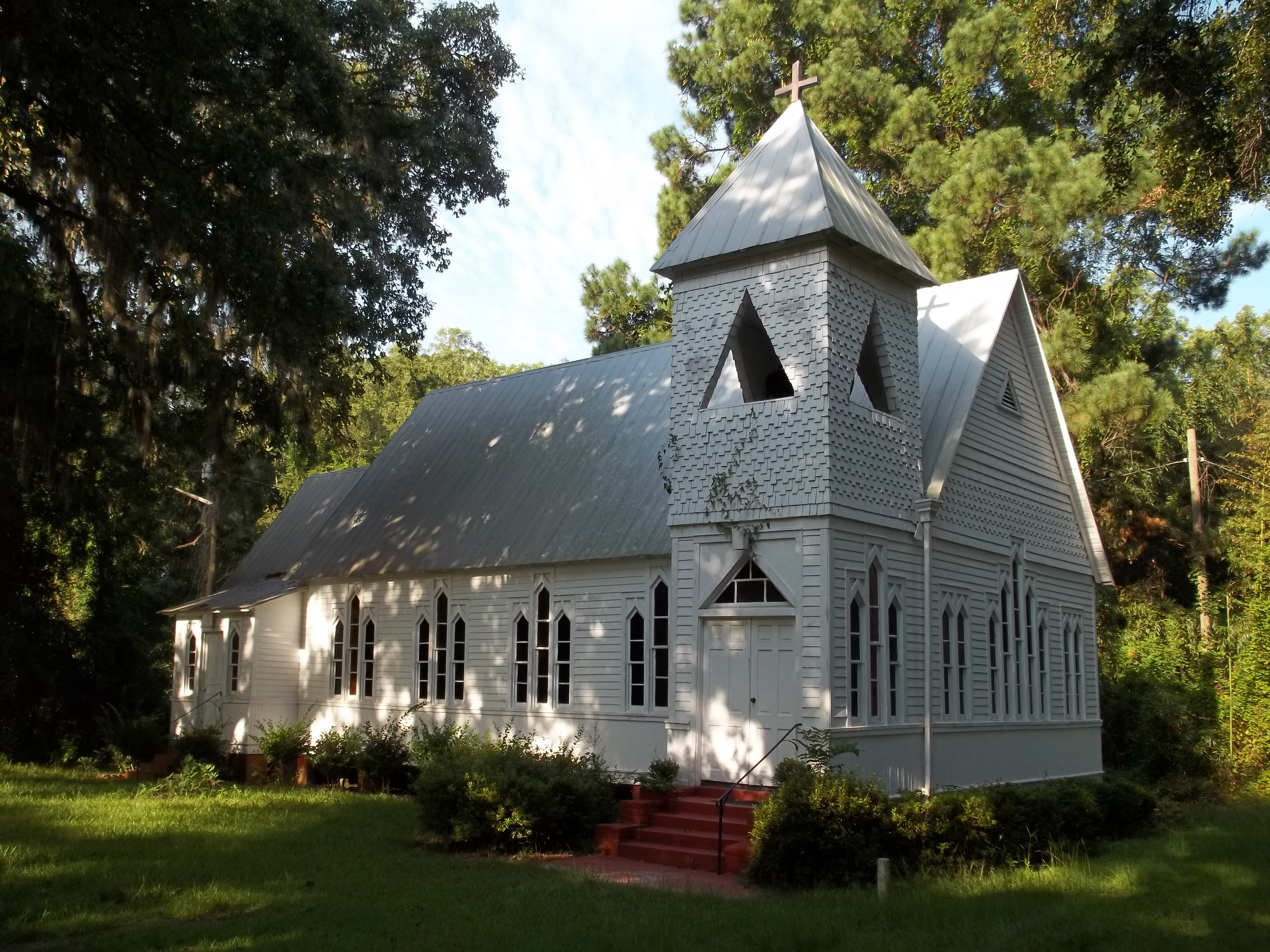
St. Bartholomew's

- Burroughs
  - St. Bartholomew's Church
- Nicholsonville
  - Nicholsonville Baptist Church
- Savannah
  - Beach Institute
  - Laurel Grove-South Cemetery

== Clarke County ==
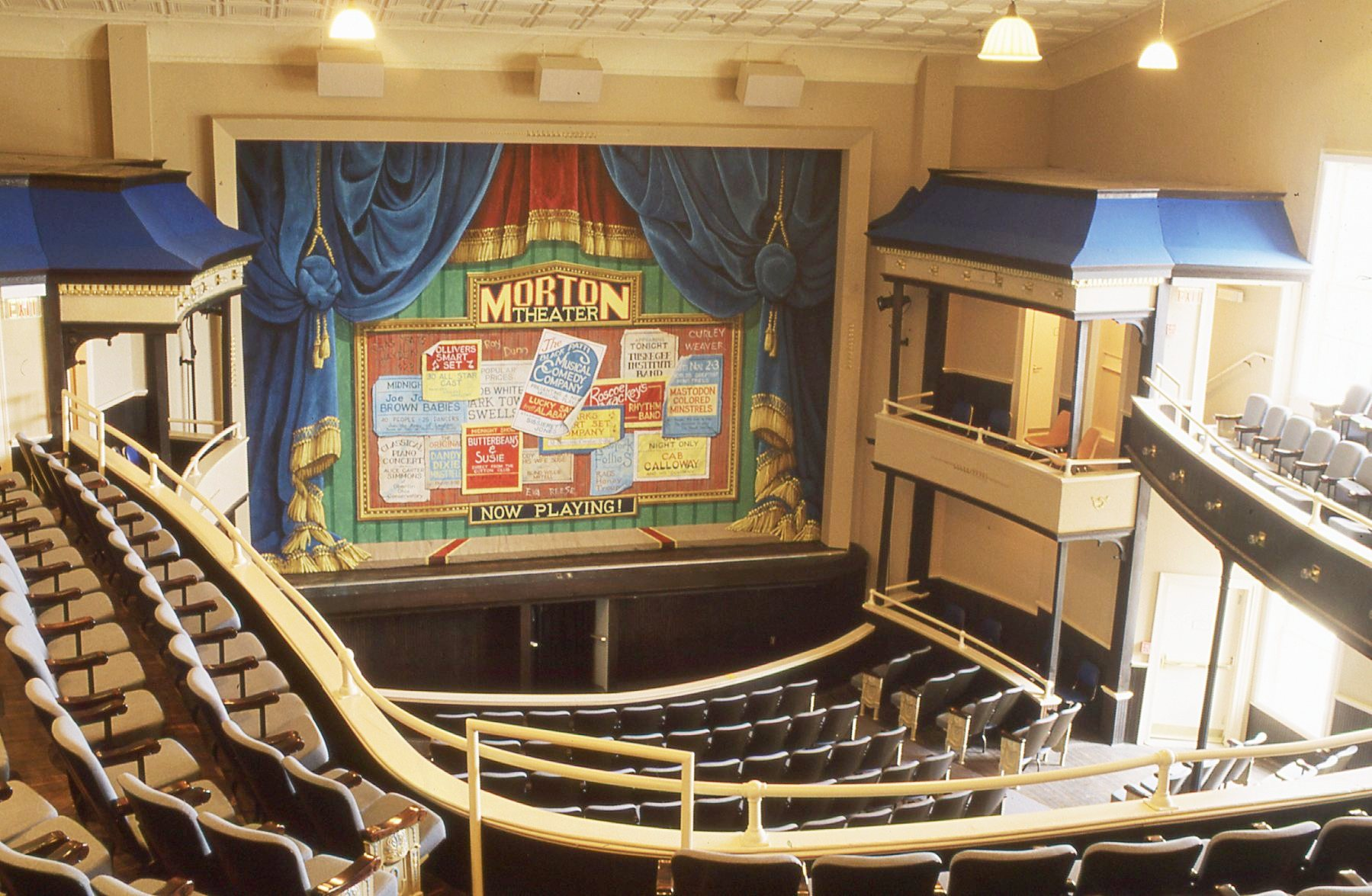
Morton Theater

- Athens
  - Chestnut Grove School
  - Morton Building
  - Reese Street Historic District

== Cobb County ==
- Marietta
  - Zion Baptist Church

== Dougherty County ==
- Albany
  - Bridge House

== Effingham County ==
- Guyton
  - New Hope AME Church

== Elbert County ==
- Elberton
  - Dove Creek Baptist Church

== Floyd County ==
- Cave Spring
  - Chubb Methodist Episcopal Church

== Fulton County ==
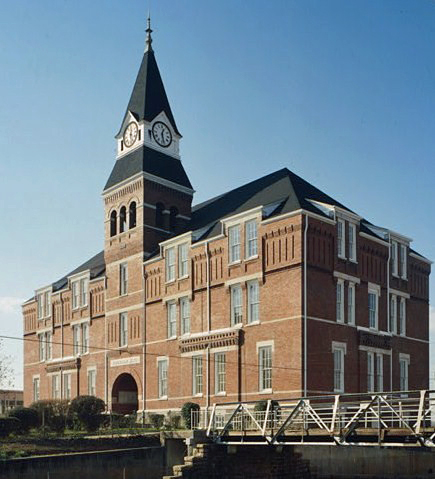
Stone Hall in 1979

- Atlanta
  - Atlanta University Center District
  - Butler Street Colored Methodist Episcopal Church
  - First Congregational Church
  - Martin Luther King Jr. National Historical Park
  - Odd Fellows Building and Auditorium
  - Stone Hall, Atlanta University
  - Sweet Auburn Historic District
  - Booker T. Washington High School
- Younge Street School

== Glynn County ==
- St. Simons Island
  - Hamilton Plantation Slave Cabins

== Greene County ==
- Greensboro
  - Dr. Calvin M. Baber House
  - South Street-Broad Street-Main Street-Laurel Street Historic District
  - Springfield Baptist Church

== Habersham County ==
- Clakesville
  - Daes Chapel Methodist Church

== Hancock County ==
- Mayfield
  - Camilla-Zack Community Center District

== Hart County ==
- Hartwell
  - H.E. Fortson House
  - Jackson Morrison House
  - John Underwood House

== Jefferson County ==
- Louisville
  - Old Market

== Liberty County ==
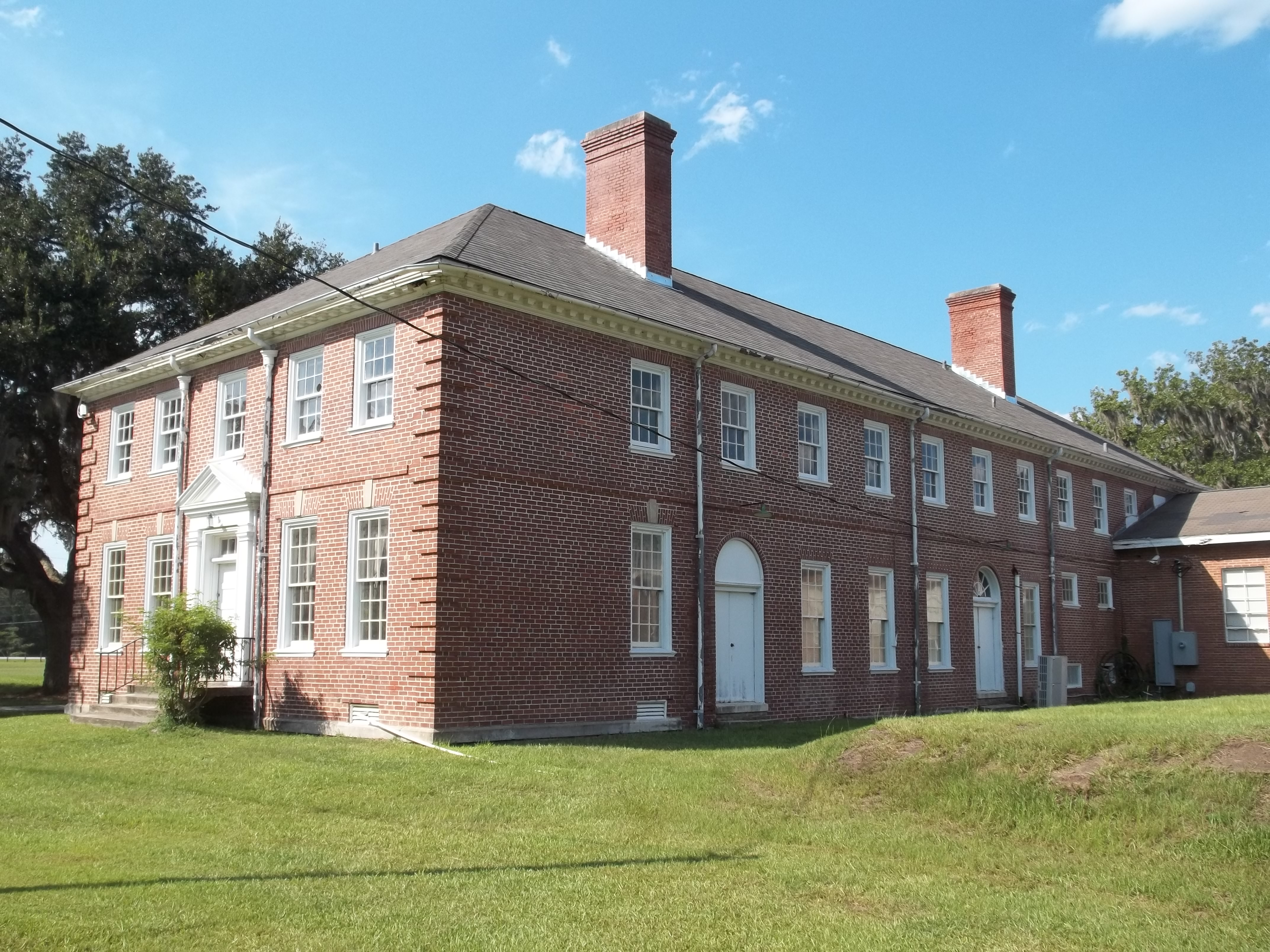
Dorchester Academy Boys' Dormitory

- Midway
  - Dorchester Academy Boys' Dormitory

== Lowndes County ==
- Valdosta
  - Dasher High School

== Meriwether County ==
- Greenville
  - Greenville Historic District
- Woodbury
  - Red Oak Creek Covered Bridge

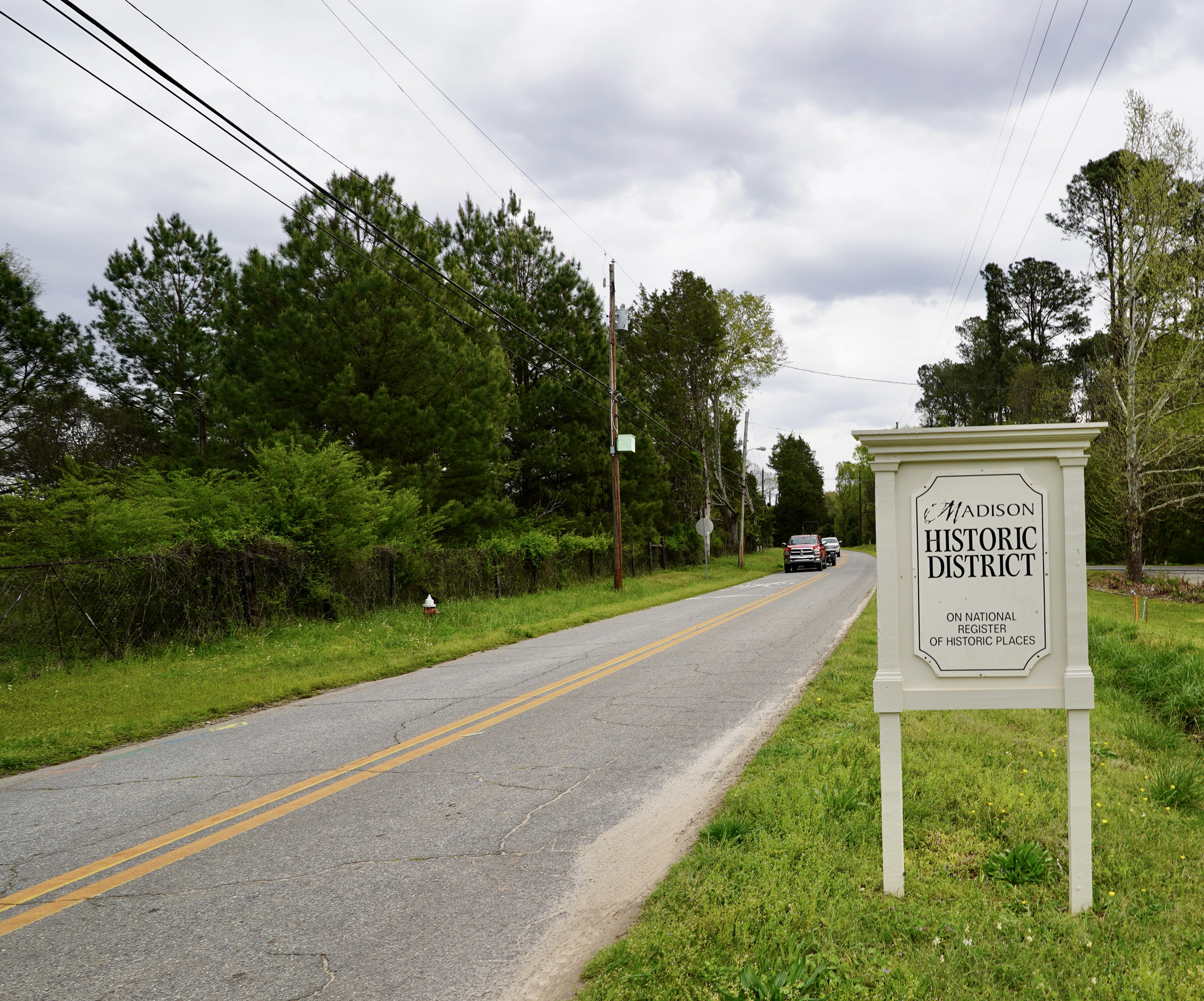
Madison Historic District Marker

== Morgan County ==
- Madison
  - Madison Historic District (Boundary Increase)

== Muscogee County ==
- Columbus
  - Building at 1612 3rd Avenue
  - Claflin School
  - Colored Cemetery
  - First African Baptist Church
  - Girard Colored Misson
  - Liberty Theater
  - Isaac Maund House
  - William Price House
  - Gertrude Pridgett "Ma" Rainey House
  - William Henry Spencer House
  - St. Christopher's Normal and Industrial Parish School
  - John Stewart House
  - St. John Chapel

== Paulding County ==
- Hiram Colored School, a Rosenwald School that was NRHP-listed in 2001.

== Randolph County ==
- Cuthbert
  - Fletcher Henderson House

== Richmond County ==
- Augusta
  - Laney-Walker North Historic District
  - Springfield Baptist Church (Boundary Increase)

== Thomas County ==
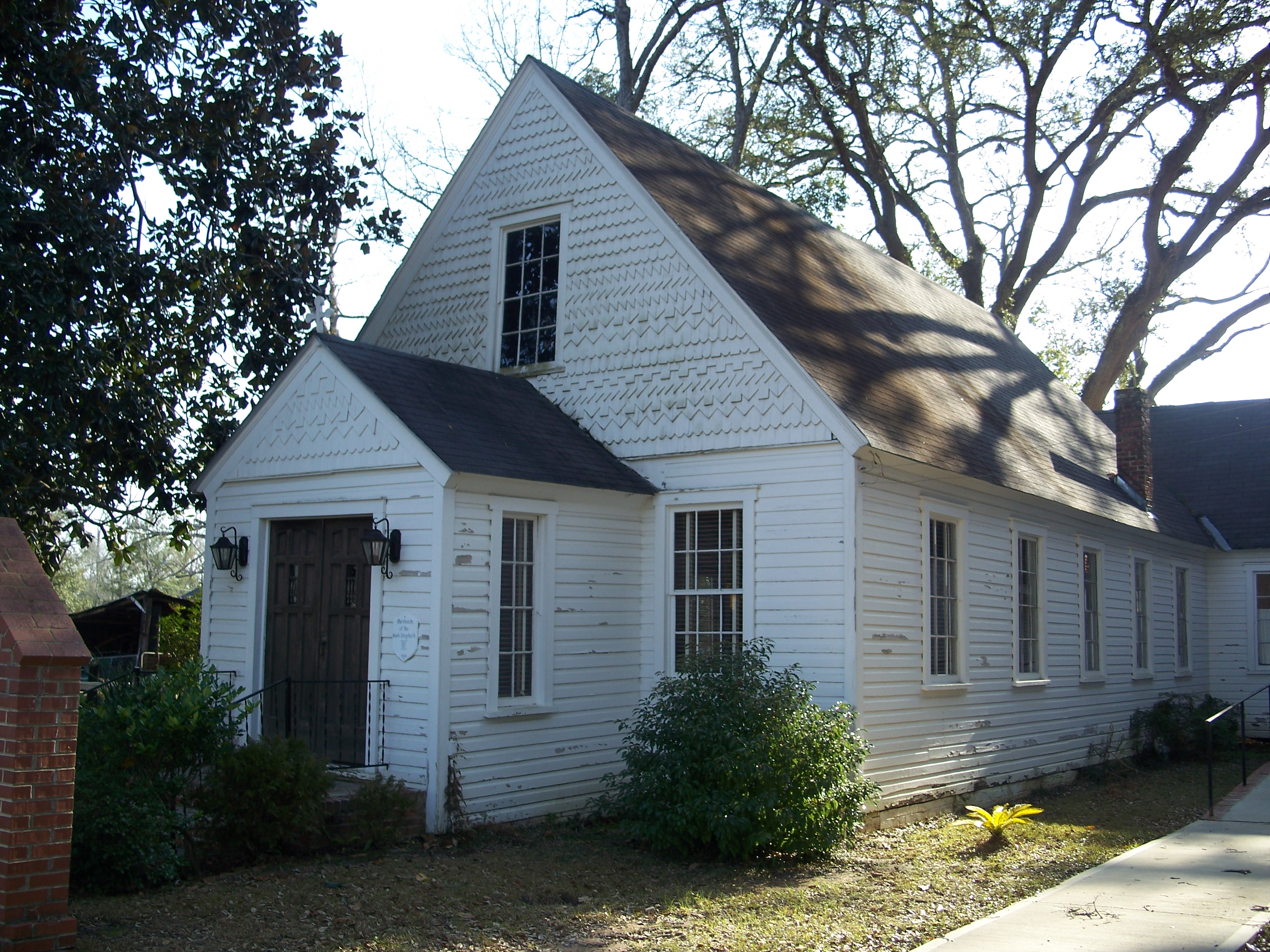
Church of the Good Shepherd

- Thomasville
  - Bethany Congregational Church
  - Church of the Good Shepherd

== Washington County ==
- Sanderville
  - Thomas Jefferson Elder High and Industrial School, the first Rosenwald School in Georgia to be listed on the National Register (in 1981)
