= Greene County School District (Georgia) =

School district in Georgia (U.S. state)

Address
- 101 3rd Street Greensboro, Georgia, 30642-1440; United States
- Coordinates: 33.568317°N 83.181921°W

District information
- Motto: Educate. Inspire. Challenge. Support.
- Grades: Pre-school - 12
- Superintendent: Dr. L. C. Houston
- Accreditation(s): Southern Association of Colleges and Schools; Georgia Accrediting Commission

Students and staff
- Enrollment: 2,250
- Faculty: 158

Other information
- Website: greene.k12.ga.us

The Greene County School District is a public school district in Greene County, Georgia, United States, based in Greensboro. It serves the communities of Greensboro, Scull Shoals, Siloam, Union Point, White Plains, and Woodville.

== Schools ==
The Greene County School District has two elementary schools, one middle school, one high school, and one charter school.

- Union Point STEAM Academy

=== Middle school ===
- Anita White Carson Middle School

=== High school ===
- Greene County High School

=== Charter school ===
- Lake Oconee Charter School
