= Brown-Bryson Farm =

Gothic Revival-style cottage

- U.S. National Register of Historic Places
- Location within Georgia
- Location: 1760 Siloam-Veazey Rd., near Siloam, Georgia
- Coordinates: 33°31′43″N 83°06′11″W
- Area: 168 acres (68 ha)
- Built: 1870
- Built by: Bryson, Jim
- Architectural style: Gothic Revival
- NRHP reference No.: 99000693
- Added to NRHP: June 10, 1999

The Brown-Bryson Farm, in Greene County, Georgia near Siloam, Georgia, dates from c.1870. It was listed on the National Register of Historic Places in 1999. The listing included six contributing buildings and five contributing structures on 168 acres (68 ha).

The main house is a one-and-one-half-story Gothic Revival-style cottage with a center-passage plan and a rear kitchen ell.

Outbuildings may date from c.1870 when the original main house, which burned in 1873 or 1874, was built.
