= African Americans in Georgia =

Largest minority in Georgia, United States

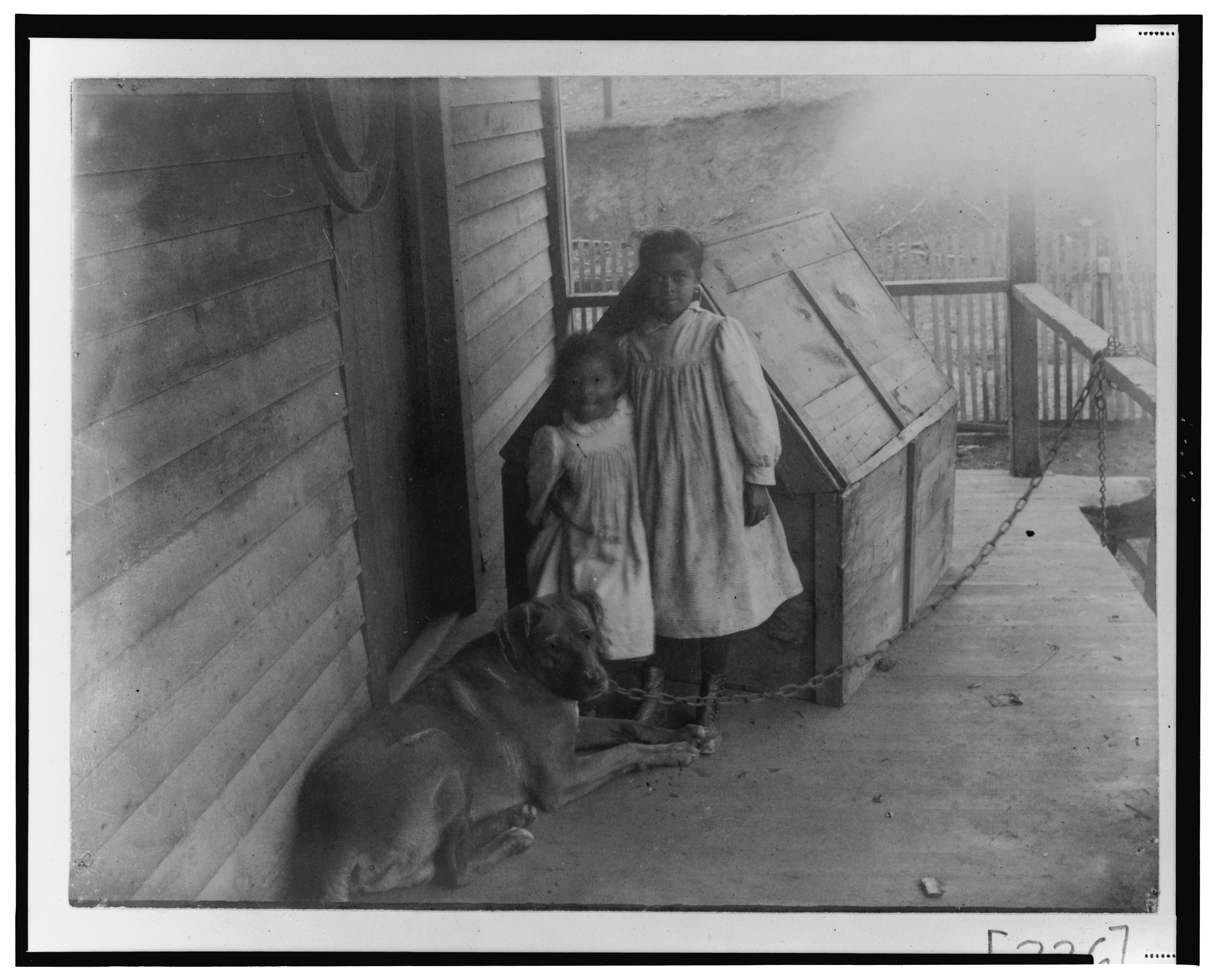
- African American children in Georgia

Total population
- 3,495,258 (2017)

Regions with significant populations
- Atlanta, Stonecrest, Lithonia, Atlanta metropolitan area, Albany, Columbus, Augusta, Savannah, Macon, Valdosta, Hancock County, Dougherty County, Clayton County, Fulton County, DeKalb County, many rural counties throughout the southwest part of the state

Languages
- Southern American English, African American Vernacular English, African-American English, Gullah, African languages

Religion
- Historically Black Protestant

Related ethnic groups
- White Americans in Georgia

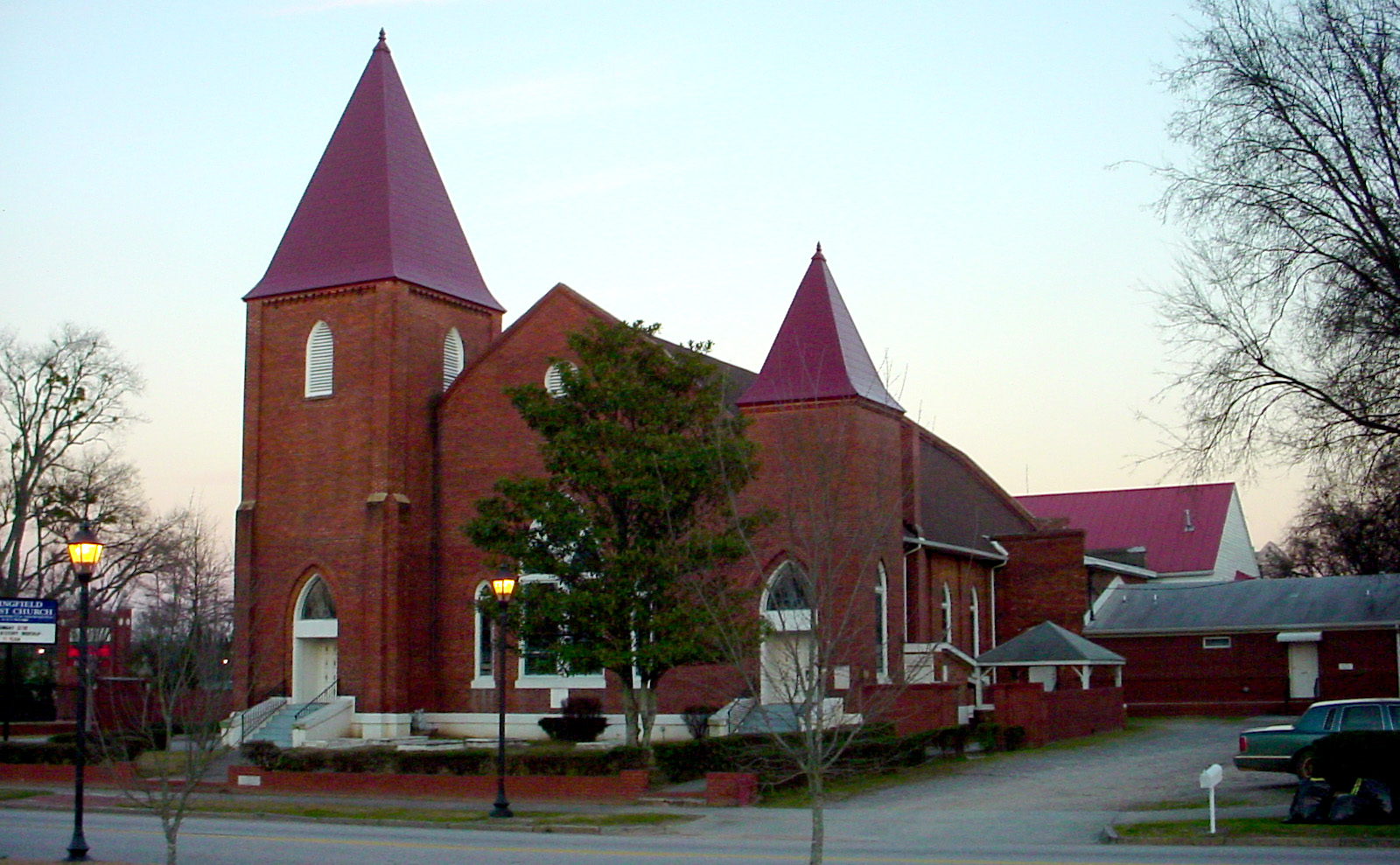
Oldest African American church located in Georgia

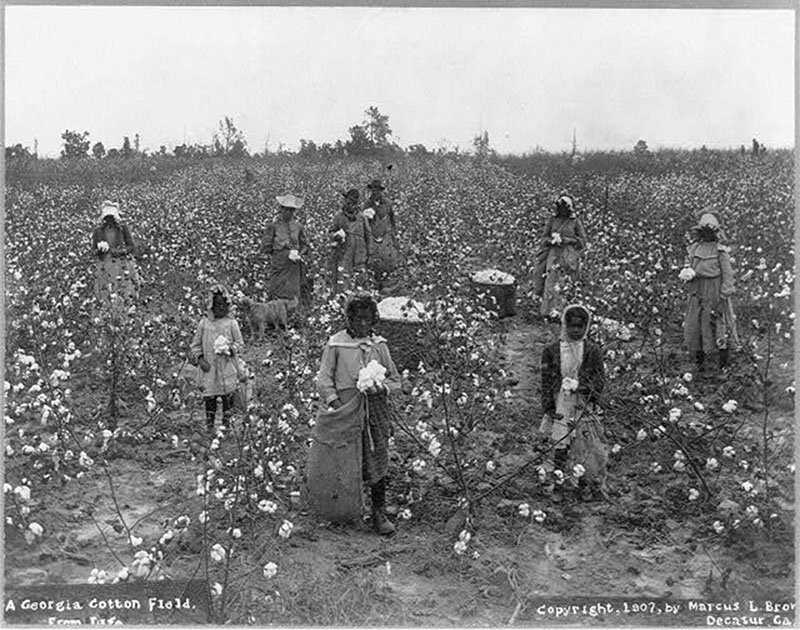
African Americans picking cotton in Georgia, 1907

African-American Georgians, or Black Georgians, are residents of the U.S. state of Georgia who are of African American ancestry. As of the 2010 U.S. Census, African Americans were 31.2% of the state's population. Georgia has the second-largest African-American population in the United States following Texas. Georgia also has a gullah community. African slaves were brought to Georgia during the slave trade.

In the 2020 Census, 3,320,513 Georgia residents were identified as African American (31.0% of the total 10,711,908). In 19 of the state's 159 counties, African Americans make up more than 50% of the population: Dougherty (69.9%), Clayton (69.9%), Hancock (69.0%), Calhoun (64.3%), Terrell (60.6%), Randolph (60.3%), Macon (59.3%), Warren (58.5%), Rockdale (58.1%), Clay (56.1%), and 9 other counties. African Americans in the ten counties of Fulton (453,834), DeKalb (388,963), Gwinnett (262,709), Clayton (207,981), Cobb (203,840), Henry (118,124), Richmond (114,201), Chatham (109,313), Muscogee (96,163), and Bibb (85,885) make up more than 61% of all African Americans in the state.

== History ==
African American slaves in 1850

Native Americans were initially enslaved in the region but their population was decimated because of diseases brought by the Spanish. Europeans then later turned to Africans for slavery because they deemed the black race inferior and suitable for slavery. Native American tribes such as the Cherokee, Creek, Guale, Timucuan, Apalachee, Westo and Choctaw populated the Georgia region before European invasion and the Atlantic slave trade.

Spanish colonists brought African slaves to Georgia in 1526. African slaves imported to Georgia primarily came from Angola, Sierra Leone, and the Gambia. Slaves were also imported from South Carolina and the West Indies. Slaves mostly worked on cotton and rice plantations. By the mid-19th century the majority of white people in Georgia, like most White Southerners, had come to view slavery as economically indispensable to their society. Georgia, with the largest number plantations of any state in the Southern United States, had in many respects come to epitomize plantation culture. When the American Civil War started in 1861, most white people in the South joined in the defense of the Confederate States of America (Confederacy), which the state Georgia had helped to create.

Between the years 1751 and 1773, the black population in Georgia grew from around 500 to around 15,000. Slaves from Georgia were also brought to Georgia by South Carolinian and Caribbean owners and those purchased in South Carolina, around 44% black slaves in Georgia were shipped to the colony from West Africa (57%), from or via the Caribbean (37%), and from the other mainland colonies in the United States (6%) in the years between 175s and 1771.

In 1912, White people drove out every Black resident in Forsyth County.

Beginning in the 1890s, Georgia passed a wide variety of Jim Crow laws that mandated racial segregation and racial separation for white people in public facilities and effectively codified the region's tradition of white supremacy. Lynching African Americans was also common in Georgia. White mobs would lynch black men.

Georgia became a slave state in 1751. Initially, Georgia was the only British colony in the United States to try to ban slavery.

White slaveholders would frequently beat and sometimes had killed slaves.

Spanish explorer Lucas Vázquez de Ayllón brought African slaves to Georgia.

=== Civil War ===
The Civil War happened in Georgia. African American soldiers fought the Civil War in Georgia.

=== Lynching ===
Many black men were lynched by white mobs in Georgia. Notably, Robert Mallard and Isaiah Nixon, who were both lynched by the Ku Klux Klan for voting in the 1948 Georgia gubernatorial special election.

=== Historically black colleges and universities ===
Georgia is the home of ten historically Black colleges and universities (HBCUs): Albany State University, Clark Atlanta University, Fort Valley State University, Interdenominational Theological Center, Morehouse College, Morehouse School of Medicine, Morris Brown College, Paine College, Savannah State University, and Spelman College.

=== Politics ===
The historically Republican state of Georgia flipped blue in the 2020 Presidential Election and the 2021 U.S. Senate runoffs, in part, due to high Black voter turnout. Joe Biden won the Black vote in Georgia in a 2020 exit poll with 88% of Black Georgians voting for Biden.

This shift from red to purple is in part, due to young, college-educated Black Americans, who largely vote for Democrats, moving from Northern and Western regions of the country to the South, in a phenomenon often referred to as the New Great Migration.

=== Civil Rights ===
- A.D. King (1930–1969)
- Bernice King (born 1963)
- Dexter King (born 1961)
- John Wesley Dobbs (1882–1961)
- Martin Luther King III (born 1957)
- Martin Luther King Jr. (1929–1968), born and raised in Atlanta, attended Morehouse College and was the first president of the Southern Christian Leadership Conference, both based in the city.
- Martin Luther King Sr. (1899–1984)
- Yolanda King (1955–2007)

=== Politics ===
- Clarence Thomas (born 1948)
- Raphael Warnock (born 1969), came to prominence for his activism as a pastor in Atlanta. Warnock is the first African American to represent Georgia in the Senate and the first Black Democrat to be elected to the Senate by a former state of the Confederacy.
- Stacey Abrams (born 1973), two-time Democratic candidate for governor was born in Madison, Wisconsin, but was raised in Gulfport, Mississippi. Moved with her family to Atlanta in 1989.
- Andrew Young

=== Music ===
- 112, African American R&B band
- 21 Savage (born 1992), originally claiming to be from Decatur, GA, the rapper was revealed to have been born in Newham, London after being detained by U.S. Immigration and Customs Enforcement (ICE) for overstaying his Visa.
- André 3000 (born 1975)
- Big Boi (born 1975)
- Ciara (born 1985)
- Future (born 1983)
- Gladys Knight (born 1944)
- Gucci Mane (born 1980), moved to Atlanta from his birthplace in Bessemer, Alabama with his single mother at age 9.
- James Brown (1933–2006)
- Jeezy (born 1977)
- Kanye West (born 1977), born in Atlanta, moved to Chicago with his mother after his parents' divorce at age 3.
- Kelly Rowland (born 1981), born in Atlanta, moved with family to Houston as a child, where she would go on to form a relationship with a young Beyoncé.
- Keri Hilson (born 1982)
- Lil Baby (born 1994)
- Lil Jon (born 1972)
- Lil Nas X (born 1999)
- Lil Yachty (born 1997)
- Little Richard (1932–2020)
- Ludacris (born 1977)
- Offset (rapper) (born 1991)
- Otis Redding (1941–1967)
- Pastor Troy (born 1977)
- Quavo (born 1991)
- Ray Charles (1930–2004)
- Soulja Boy (born 1990)
- T.I. (born 1980)
- Takeoff (rapper) (1994–2022)
- Usher (born 1978)
- Young Thug (born 1991)
- Bobby V (born 1980)
- Waka Flocka Flame (born 1986)
- CeeLo Green (born 1975)
- Yung Joc (born 1980)
- Lil Scrappy (born 1984)
- Rasheeda
- Quando Rondo (born 1999)
- Silentó (born 1998)

=== Sport ===
- Calvin Johnson (born 1985), retired NFL wide receiver.
- Champ Bailey (born 1978), retired NFL cornerback.
- Dwight Howard (born 1985), NBA center who is currently playing in Taiwan for the Taoyuan Leopards.
- Herschel Walker (born 1962), Heisman trophy winner and Republican candidate for U.S. Senate in 2022.
- Jackie Robinson (1919–1972), born in Cairo, Georgia, but was primarily raised in California.
- Jim Brown (born 1936), born in St. Simon's Island, moved to Long Island with his family at age 8.
- Lou Williams (born 1986), retired NBA guard.
- Rock Ya-Sin (born 1996), NFL cornerback for the Baltimore Ravens.
- Sugar Ray Robinson (1921–1989)
- Thomas Davis Sr. (born 1983), retired NFL linebacker
- Tyreek Hill (born 1994), NFL wide receiver for the Miami Dolphins.
- Walt Frazier (born 1945)

=== Religious ===
- Wilton Gregory (born 1947), Catholic cardinal

=== Film and television ===
- Chris Tucker (born 1971)
- Donald Glover (born 1983), comedian, actor, rapper, writer, director, and producer who created the acclaimed comedy-drama Atlanta along with his brother Stephen.
- Raven-Symoné (born 1985)
- Spike Lee born 1957), born in Atlanta, moved with his family to Brooklyn during childhood. Returned to Atlanta to attend Morehouse College.

=== Writing ===
- Delores Phillips (1950–2014)
- Owen Dodson (1914–1983)
- Tayari Jones (born 1970)

=== Various ===
- Mary Frances Early

== See also ==
- History of Georgia (U.S. state)
- United States
- African Americans in Atlanta
- Black Southerners
- Gullah
- History of slavery in Georgia (U.S. state)
- List of African-American historic places in Georgia
- List of African-American newspapers in Georgia
