= Woodville, Georgia =

- City
- Location in Greene County and the state of Georgia
- Coordinates: 33°40′41″N 83°6′28″W
- Country: United States
- State: Georgia
- County: Greene

Area
  - Total: 4.98 sq mi (12.90 km^{2})
  - Land: 4.96 sq mi (12.85 km^{2})
  - Water: 0.015 sq mi (0.04 km^{2})
- Elevation: 702 ft (214 m)

Population (2020)
  - Total: 264
  - Density: 53.2/sq mi (20.54/km^{2})
- Time zone: UTC-5 (Eastern (EST))
  - Summer (DST): UTC-4 (EDT)
- FIPS code: 13-84260
- GNIS feature ID: 0356651

Woodville is a city in Greene County, Georgia, United States. As of the 2020 census, Woodville had a population of 264.

== History ==
According to tradition Woodville was so named from the fact it was a shipping point of wood. The Georgia General Assembly incorporated Woodville as a city in 1911.

== Geography ==
Woodville is in northeastern Greene County along Georgia State Route 77 (Dogwood Road), 4.5 miles (7.2 km) north of Union Point and 8 miles (13 km) south of Maxeys. Greensboro, the Greene County seat, is 9 miles (14 km) to the southwest.

According to the United States Census Bureau, Woodville has a total area of 4.9 square miles (12.7 km^{2}), of which 0.02 square miles (0.04 km^{2}), or 0.33%, is water.

== Demographics ==
Historical population
Census	Pop.	Note	%±
1920	458		—
1930	332		−27.5%
1940	458		38.0%
1950	484		5.7%
1960	372		−23.1%
1970	379		1.9%
1980	455		20.1%
1990	415		−8.8%
2000	400		−3.6%
2010	321		−19.7%
2020	264		−17.8%
U.S. Decennial Census; 1850-1870 1870-1880; 1890-1910 1920-1930; 1940 1950 1960; 1970 1980 1990; 2000 2010 2020

=== Racial and ethnic composition ===
Woodville city, Georgia – Racial and ethnic composition Note: the US Census treats Hispanic/Latino as an ethnic category. This table excludes Latinos from the racial categories and assigns them to a separate category. Hispanics/Latinos may be of any race.
Race / Ethnicity (NH = Non-Hispanic)	Pop 2000	Pop 2010	Pop 2020	% 2000	% 2010	% 2020
White alone (NH)	95	92	95	35.98%	28.66%	35.98%
Black or African American alone (NH)	164	219	164	62.12%	68.22%	62.12%
Native American or Alaska Native alone (NH)	0	0	0	0.00%	0.00%	0.00%
Asian alone (NH)	2	1	2	0.76%	0.31%	0.76%
Native Hawaiian or Pacific Islander alone (NH)	0	0	0	0.00%	0.00%	0.00%
Other race alone (NH)	0	3	0	0.00%	0.93%	0.00%
Mixed race or Multiracial (NH)	0	2	0	0.00%	0.62%	0.00%
Hispanic or Latino (any race)	3	4	3	1.14%	1.25%	1.14%
Total	432	321	264	100.00%	100.00%	100.00%

=== 2000 census ===
As of the census of 2000, there were 400 people, 136 households, and 99 families residing in the city. The population density was 81.3 inhabitants per square mile (31.4/km^{2}). There were 147 housing units at an average density of 29.9 per square mile (11.5/km^{2}). The racial makeup of the city was 29.50% White, 69.50% African American, 0.75% Native American and 0.25% Asian. Hispanic or Latino of any race were 1.50% of the population.

There were 136 households, out of which 29.4% had children under the age of 18 living with them, 41.9% were married couples living together, 26.5% had a female householder with no husband present, and 27.2% were non-families. 22.8% of all households were made up of individuals, and 11.8% had someone living alone who was 65 years of age or older. The average household size was 2.94 and the average family size was 3.43.

In the city, the population was spread out, with 30.3% under the age of 18, 7.8% from 18 to 24, 23.8% from 25 to 44, 27.0% from 45 to 64, and 11.3% who were 65 years of age or older. The median age was 36 years. For every 100 females, there were 86.9 males. For every 100 females age 18 and over, there were 88.5 males.

The median income for a household in the city was $31,667, and the median income for a family was $34,219. Males had a median income of $25,568 versus $22,500 for females. The per capita income for the city was $14,550. About 19.4% of families and 28.1% of the population were below the poverty line, including 40.6% of those under age 18 and 9.3% of those age 65 or over.

== Notable person ==
Woodville was home to Major Robert McWhorter (CSA) who represented Greene County in the Georgia General Assembly for most of the period 1847–1884. McWhorter is noted as being the first Republican Speaker of the Georgia House of Representatives (1868–1870) under the Reconstruction era government. McWhorter is buried in Woodville Cemetery.
