= Greensboro Commercial Historic District =

Historic district in Georgia, United States

- U.S. National Register of Historic Places
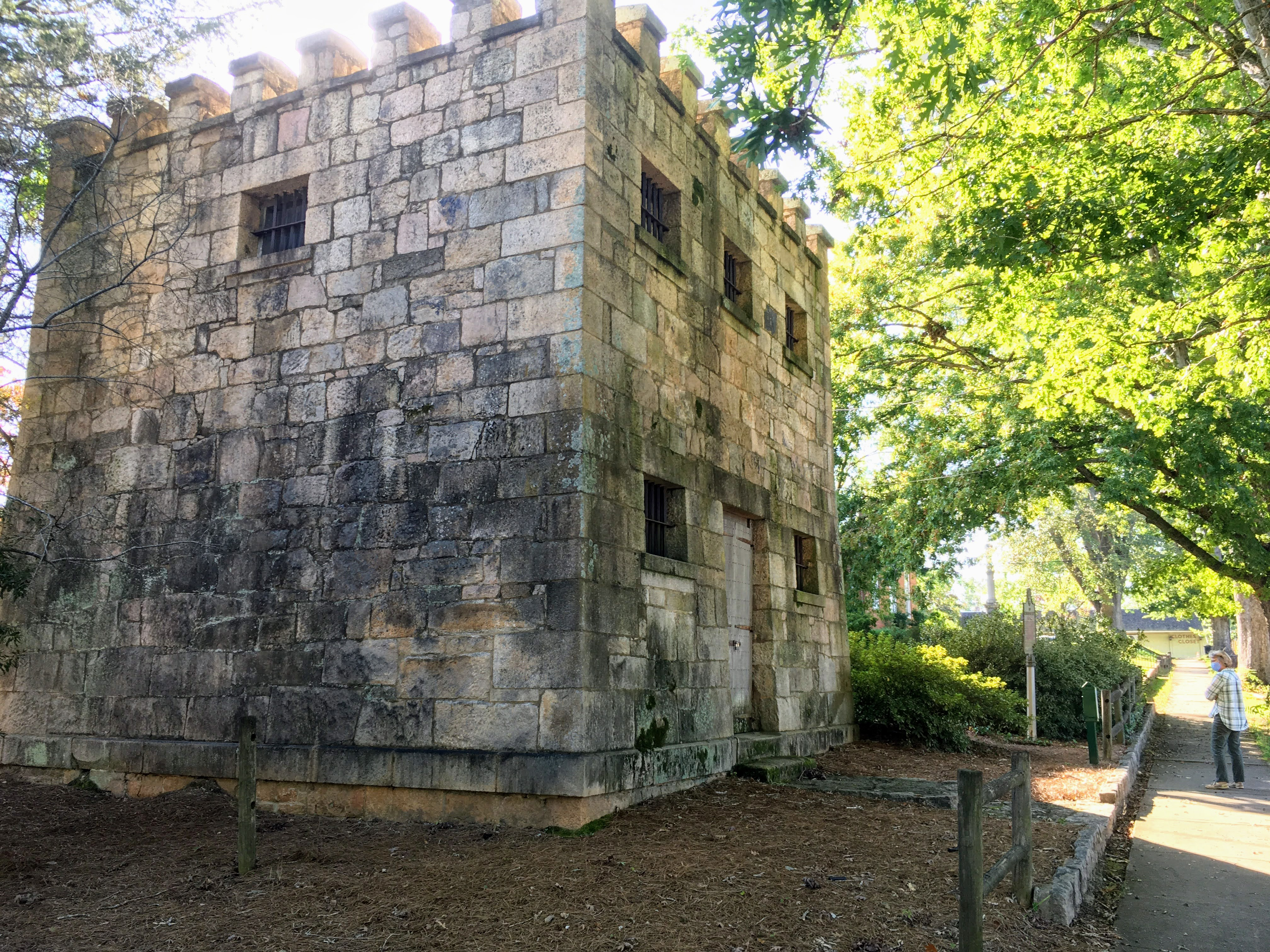
- Old Greene County Jail

- Location within Georgia
- Location: Broad and Main Sts., Greensboro, Georgia
- Coordinates: 33°34′33″N 83°10′56″W
- Area: 9 acres (3.6 ha)
- Built by: Multiple
- Architectural style: Greek Revival, Late Victorian
- MPS: Greensboro MRA
- NRHP reference No.: 87001438
- Added to NRHP: November 6, 1987

The Greensboro Commercial Historic District, in Greensboro, Georgia, is a 9 acres (3.6 ha) historic district which was listed on the National Register of Historic Places in 1987. It included 29 contributing buildings and a contributing structure.

Most of its buildings are along Main St. and Broad St. Two of the largest buildings occupy whole blocks, at the corner of Main and Broad: the McCommons Store, known historically as the "Big Store", a two-story brick building, and Copelan's Block, which includes one-story attached brick storefronts.

It includes the 1937 U.S. Post Office building, two historic jails, and the historic Greene County Courthouse.
