= Jefferson Hall (Union Point, Georgia) =

Historic house in Georgia, United States

- U.S. National Register of Historic Places
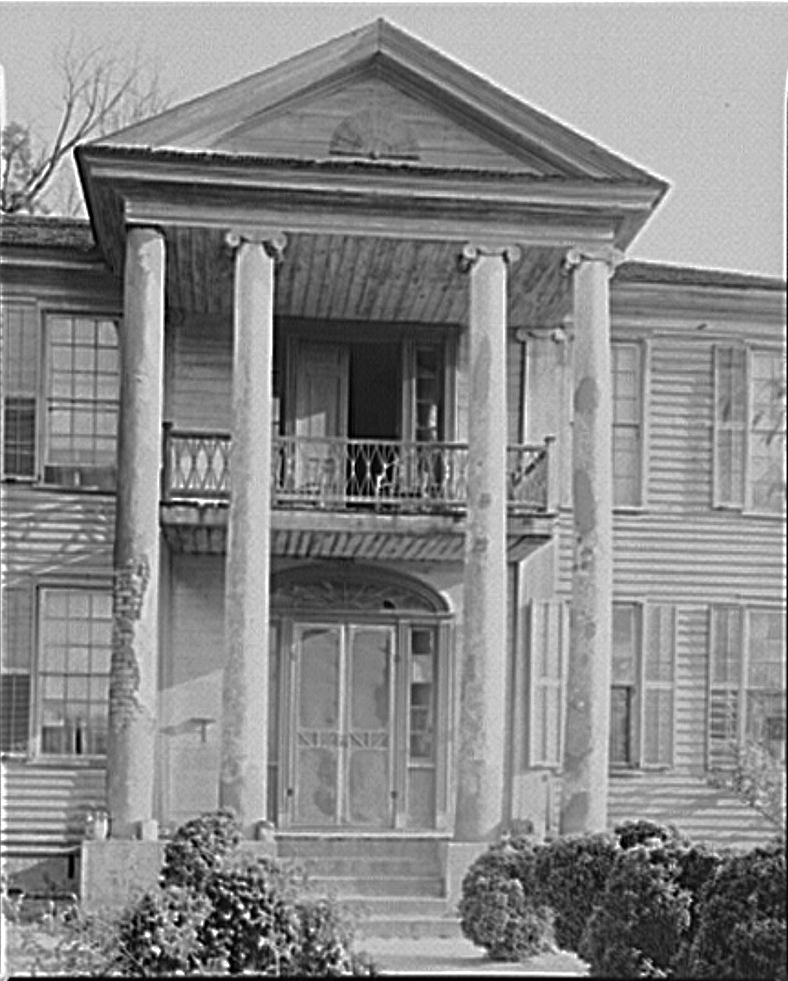
- Jefferson Hall in 1941

- Location within Georgia Location within the United States
- Nearest city: Union Point, Georgia
- Coordinates: 33.60346°N 83.04002°W
- Area: 2524
- Built: 1818
- Architectural style: Greek Revival
- NRHP reference No.: 89001100
- Added to NRHP: August 10, 1989

Jefferson Hall is a historic home located in Greene County, Georgia, just east of the city of Union Point, at 6041 Union Point Highway (a road also known as Georgia 12 and US Highway 278). Since 1989 the property has been listed on the National Register of Historic Places. The house is easily visible from the road, but is currently in private hands and is not open or accessible to the public.

Built in 1818 or 1830 (county and historical records differ on this point), Jefferson Hall is an example of Greek Revival architecture.
