= McKinley Neal =

American politician

James McKinley Neal (March 8, 1907 – ?) was a state legislator in Missouri from 1946–1964. He served in the Missouri House of Representatives. He was a pharmacologist. He was the second African American to serve in the state legislature. He supported desegregation of Missouri's public schools.

He was born in Greensboro, Georgia, the fourth of ten children in his family. He graduated from Morehouse College in Atlanta and Capitol College of Pharmacy in Denver, Colorado. He was photographed with his wife at their home in Kansas City.
