= Nathanael Greene Academy =

Location
- Po Box 109; Siloam, Greene County, Georgia 30665
- 33.531267°N 83.0757858°W

Information
- Type: Private
- Religious affiliation: Nonsectarian
- Established: 1969; 57 years ago
- NCES School ID: 00297259
- Faculty: 20 (on an FTE basis)
- Enrollment: 101 (2018)
- Student to teacher ratio: 4.8
- Website: nathanaelgreeneacademy.com

Nathanael Greene Academy is a private PK-12 school in Siloam, Georgia, a small town in Greene County. The school had a controversial history related to its founding in response to the racial desegregation of Greene County public schools.

== History ==
Nathanael Greene Academy was founded in 1969 as a segregation academy. Its original campus of five acres (2.0 ha) and three buildings was purchased from the town of Siloam for $100 and subsequently valued for tax purposes at $24,000. In its first year of operations it had no black students or teachers.

In 1970, the headmaster told a reporter that "no one would have come through those doors if it weren't for integration", although he insisted parents' main goal was quality education. The school however, employed teachers without college degrees, lacked a cafeteria and gymnasium, and instructed students in classrooms with "rickety desks" without central heating. The school did have a bus, which brought students from throughout Greene County. The civil rights activist Ruby Martin, observing the circumstances, argued that Greene Academy was "obviously" founded in response to school desegregation.

Tony Barnhart recalled that NGA was unable to establish a football team until 1973, leading some white students to stay in Green County public schools to follow family athletic traditions.

As of 2004, Nathanael Greene Academy had never admitted a black student and, the Atlanta Journal-Constitution reported, the local black community perceived the initials NGA to mean "nigger, go away".

== Student body ==
In 2018, the school had three Black students, but no Asian or Hispanic students. Surrounding Greene County has a population that is about 40% Black. For the 2018–19 school year, the student body included a low percentage of minority students.

== School Closure ==
In 2026 two teachers were convicted of having improper sexual relationships with students. The scandal involving both educators led to the closure of Nathanael Greene Academy, which had operated since 1959. The academy announced it would permanently close last year amid fallout from the investigation.
