= Lake Oconee Academy =

Coordinates: 33.4892°N 83.2420°W

Lake Oconee Academy (LOA) is a K–12 charter school in the Greene County School District in Greensboro, Georgia, United States. The school opened in 2007. LOA's school colors are white, gold, and blue. For the 2016–2017 school year, enrollment was 815 students in pre-kindergarten through 11th grade.

== History ==
Lake Oconee Academy opened in 2007, operating within Lakeside Baptist Church, until the expansion of the new and current location on Carey Station Road in Greensboro, Georgia. In 2011, the new location was announced and a grade level was added to the growing list. The school continually added a grade until the graduating class of 2018 became the very first graduating class from Lake Oconee Academy. Since the expansion, the school has been advocating for further growth, with additions including a new high school and new gymnasium. Dr. Otho Tucker has been the oldest CEO of the school since its opening.

In 2014, LOA was awarded National Blue Ribbon School status.

The school operates in the Greene County School District, alongside six other schools. It opened with seven students and has since expanded to being the largest school in Greene County, with 817 students. The graduating class of 2018 is the smallest grade level and will graduate with a total of 30 students.

== Athletics ==
The LOA Titans participate in baseball, basketball, cross country, golf, soccer, cheerleading, volleyball, American football, and softball, as well as club tennis and Club target shooting.
