= White Plains, Georgia =

- City
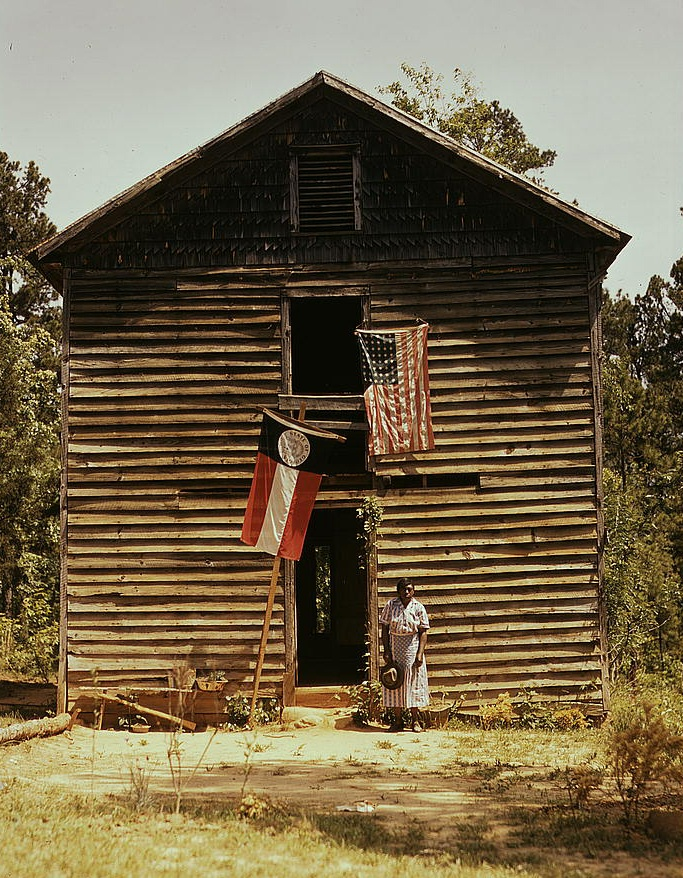

- Location in Greene County and the state of Georgia
- Coordinates: 33°28′37″N 83°2′18″W
- Country: United States
- State: Georgia
- County: Greene

Area
  - Total: 5.21 sq mi (13.50 km^{2})
  - Land: 5.17 sq mi (13.38 km^{2})
  - Water: 0.050 sq mi (0.13 km^{2})
- Elevation: 692 ft (211 m)

Population (2020)
  - Total: 239
  - Density: 46.3/sq mi (17.87/km^{2})
- Time zone: UTC-5 (Eastern (EST))
  - Summer (DST): UTC-4 (EDT)
- ZIP code: 30678
- Area code: 706
- FIPS code: 13-82692
- GNIS feature ID: 0356635

White Plains is a city in Greene County, Georgia, United States. As of the 2020 census, White Plains had a population of 239.

== History ==
The Georgia General Assembly incorporated White Plains in 1834. According to tradition, White Plains was so named on account of the local white sandy soil.

== Geography ==
White Plains is located in southeastern Greene County at 33°28′37″N 83°2′18″W (33.477002, -83.038404). The southeast border of the city follows the Hancock County line. Georgia State Route 15 (Old Greensboro Road) passes through the center of town, leading north 6 miles (9.7 km) to Siloam and south 15 miles (24 km) to Sparta. Greensboro, the Greene County seat, is 12 miles (19 km) to the northwest via State Route 15.

According to the United States Census Bureau, White Plains has a total area of 4.7 square miles (12.2 km^{2}), of which 0.04 square miles (0.1 km^{2}), or 1.02%, is water.

== Demographics ==
Historical population
Census	Pop.	Note	%±
1870	374		—
1880	459		22.7%
1890	510		11.1%
1900	290		−43.1%
1910	407		40.3%
1920	479		17.7%
1930	406		−15.2%
1940	364		−10.3%
1950	359		−1.4%
1960	273		−24.0%
1970	236		−13.6%
1980	231		−2.1%
1990	286		23.8%
2000	283		−1.0%
2010	284		0.4%
2020	239		−15.8%
U.S. Decennial Census; 1850-1870 1870-1880; 1890-1910 1920-1930; 1940 1950 1960; 1970 1980 1990; 2000 2010 2020

White Plains, Georgia – Racial and ethnic composition Note: the US Census treats Hispanic/Latino as an ethnic category. This table excludes Latinos from the racial categories and assigns them to a separate category. Hispanics/Latinos may be of any race.
Race / Ethnicity (NH = Non-Hispanic)	Pop 2000	Pop 2010	Pop 2020	% 2000	% 2010	% 2020
White alone (NH)	150	167	152	53.00%	58.80%	63.60%
Black or African American alone (NH)	124	115	74	43.82%	40.49%	30.96%
Native American or Alaska Native alone (NH)	0	0	0	0.00%	0.00%	0.00%
Asian alone (NH)	0	0	0	0.00%	0.00%	0.00%
Native Hawaiian or Pacific Islander alone (NH)	0	0	0	0.00%	0.00%	0.00%
Other race alone (NH)	0	0	1	0.00%	0.00%	0.42%
Mixed race or Multiracial (NH)	0	1	7	0.00%	0.35%	2.93%
Hispanic or Latino (any race)	9	1	5	3.18%	0.35%	2.09%
Total	283	284	239	100.00%	100.00%	100.00%

As of the census of 2000, there were 283 people, 108 households, and 72 families residing in the city. The population density was 61.5 inhabitants per square mile (23.7/km^{2}). There were 126 housing units at an average density of 27.4 per square mile (10.6/km^{2}). The racial makeup of the city was 55.83% White and 44.17% African American. Hispanic or Latino of any race were 3.18% of the population.

There were 108 households, out of which 32.4% had children under the age of 18 living with them, 41.7% were married couples living together, 23.1% had a female householder with no husband present, and 33.3% were non-families. 26.9% of all households were made up of individuals, and 13.9% had someone living alone who was 65 years of age or older. The average household size was 2.62 and the average family size was 3.28.

In the city, the population was spread out, with 25.8% under the age of 18, 9.9% from 18 to 24, 31.1% from 25 to 44, 21.9% from 45 to 64, and 11.3% who were 65 years of age or older. The median age was 35 years. For every 100 females, there were 87.4 males. For every 100 females age 18 and over, there were 85.8 males.

The median income for a household in the city was $33,906, and the median income for a family was $36,136. Males had a median income of $22,143 versus $15,781 for females. The per capita income for the city was $12,328. About 16.3% of families and 24.6% of the population were below the poverty line, including 36.6% of those under the age of eighteen and 20.9% of those 65 or over.
