= Bairdstown, Georgia =

Unincorporated community in Georgia, U.S.

Coordinates: 33°41′53″N 83°07′08″W

Bairdstown is an unincorporated community in Greene and Oglethorpe counties, in the U.S. state of Georgia.

== History ==
Bairdstown was originally called "Hurricane Branch", and under the latter name settlement was made in 1825. The present name is after one Mr. Baird, a local resident. A post office called Bairdstown was established in 1845, and remained in operation until 1959. In 1900, the community had 86 inhabitants.
