= Joseph Parker Jr. =

American medical doctor (1916–2012)

Joseph Lee Parker Jr. (November 20, 1916 – September 27, 2012) was an American medical doctor. Parker was the last surviving United States Naval physician who participated in the Allied invasion of Omaha Beach on June 6, 1944.

Parker was born in Waycross, Georgia, to Joseph Lee Parker Sr. and Vera Estelle Sweat. He graduated from the University of Georgia before completing medical school at the Medical College of Georgia in Augusta, Georgia. Parker began his career at University Hospital in Augusta as an intern.

Parker was assigned to the Marine Corps Recruit Depot Parris Island in 1943. He was then transferred to the 6th Amphibious Forces, based at the former Camp Bradford.

Parker was transferred again to the 6th Naval Beach Battalion, with whom he was a member of at the landing at Omaha Beach. As a U.S. Naval physician, Parker treated wounded Allied and German troops for twenty-one days immediately following the invasion at a medical facility located on Omaha Beach.

In 2011, Parker was awarded the Legion of Honour medal by the French government at a ceremony which included sixteen other American World War II veterans.

Parker, a resident of Greensboro, Georgia, died at Good Samaritan Hospital in Greensboro on September 27, 2012, at the age of 95. Researchers concluded that he was the last surviving physician who served at Omaha Beach.
