= Dr. Calvin M. Baber House =

- U.S. National Register of Historic Places
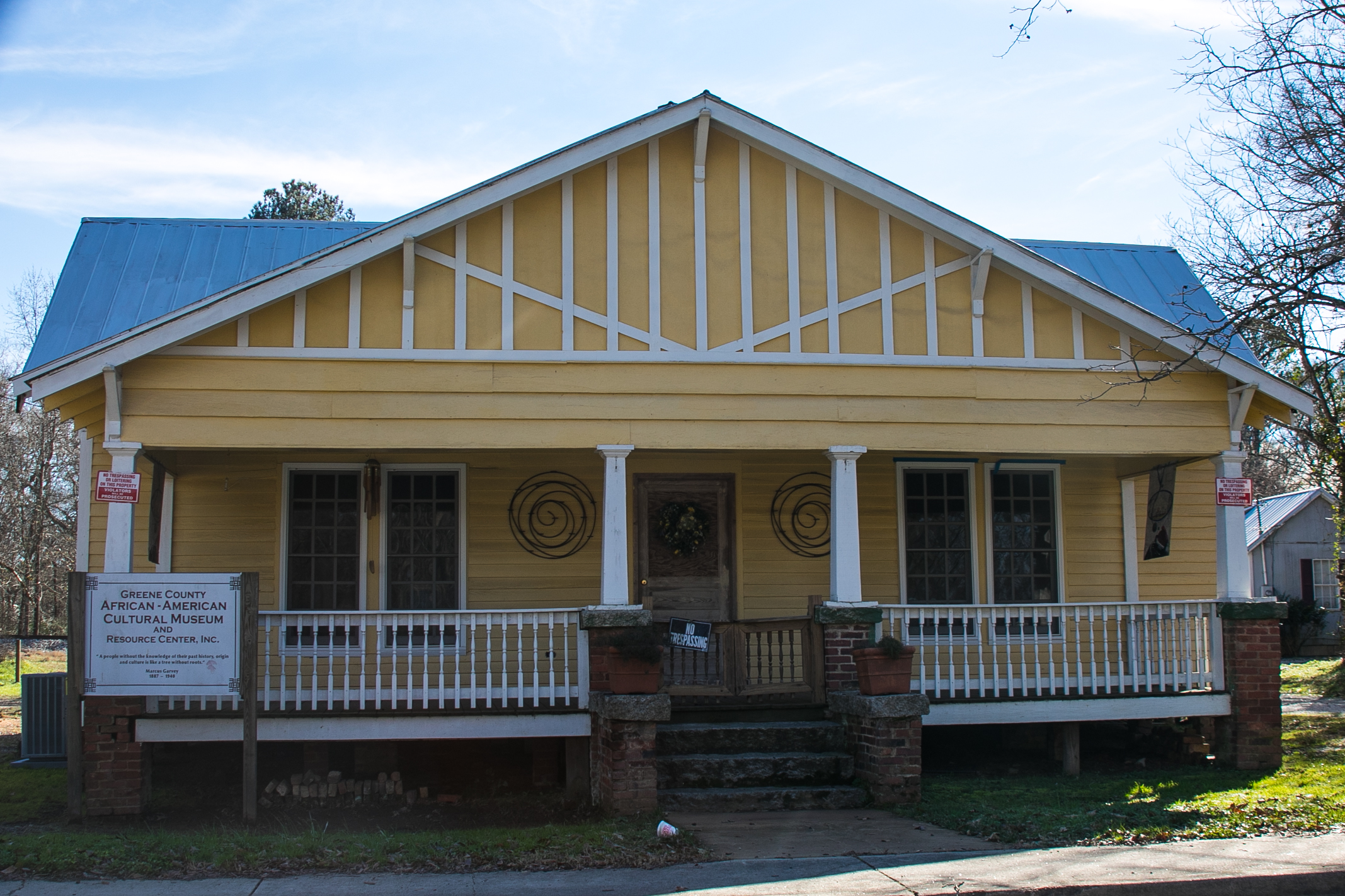

- Location within Georgia
- Location: Penfield Rd. Greensboro, Georgia
- Coordinates: 33°35′04″N 83°10′26″W
- Area: less than one acre
- Built: 1924
- Architectural style: Bungalow/craftsman
- MPS: Greensboro MRA
- NRHP reference No.: 87001439
- Added to NRHP: December 17, 1987

The Dr. Calvin M. Baber House, on Penfield Rd. in Greensboro, Georgia, was built in 1924. It was listed on the National Register of Historic Places in 1987.

It is a one-story weatherboarded bungalow-style house, the home of the second black doctor in Greensboro. Dr. Calvin M. Baber graduated from Meharry Medical College in Tennessee in 1921. He came to Greensboro after the death of Dr. A. T. Chisolm, the first black doctor.
