= Dove Creek Baptist Church =

Historic church in Georgia, US

- U.S. National Register of Historic Places
- Location within Georgia
- Location: GA 72, near Elberton, Georgia
- Coordinates: 34°04′20″N 82°57′05″W
- Area: less than one acre
- Built: 1880
- NRHP reference No.: 87001154
- Added to NRHP: July 9, 1987

The Dove Creek Baptist Church, in Elbert County, Georgia, was built in 1880. It was listed on the National Register of Historic Places in 1987.

It was deemed significant "as one of few remaining examples of small rural black churches built in the late 19th century in northeast Georgia. Founded by a small group of rural blacks who wanted their own church after the Civil War, Dove Creek Baptist Church is similar to other late 19th century rural black churches in Georgia in its simple frame construction and rectangular shape with gabled roof and little architectural detailing. Other characteristic features are the central entrance, rear extension, and weatherboard siding."

In 1987 it was located on the south side of Georgia State Route 72 about 5 miles (8.0 km) west of Elberton, Georgia. Its location was a wooded rural one; its original location about .25 miles (0.40 km) to the southeast is similar; it was moved to the northwest in 1979 towards addressing issues of vandalism and access.

The historic church may no longer exist, because a "New Cove Creek Baptist Church" exists, at Cove Creek Church Road and highway 72, as seen in Google Streetview with image capture December 2018 and by Google Satellite view, while the historic building is not visible. Google Satellite view indicates the apparent former site of the church, with a graveyard, further to the southeast along Dove Creek Church Road.
