= Jackson Morrison House =

- U.S. National Register of Historic Places
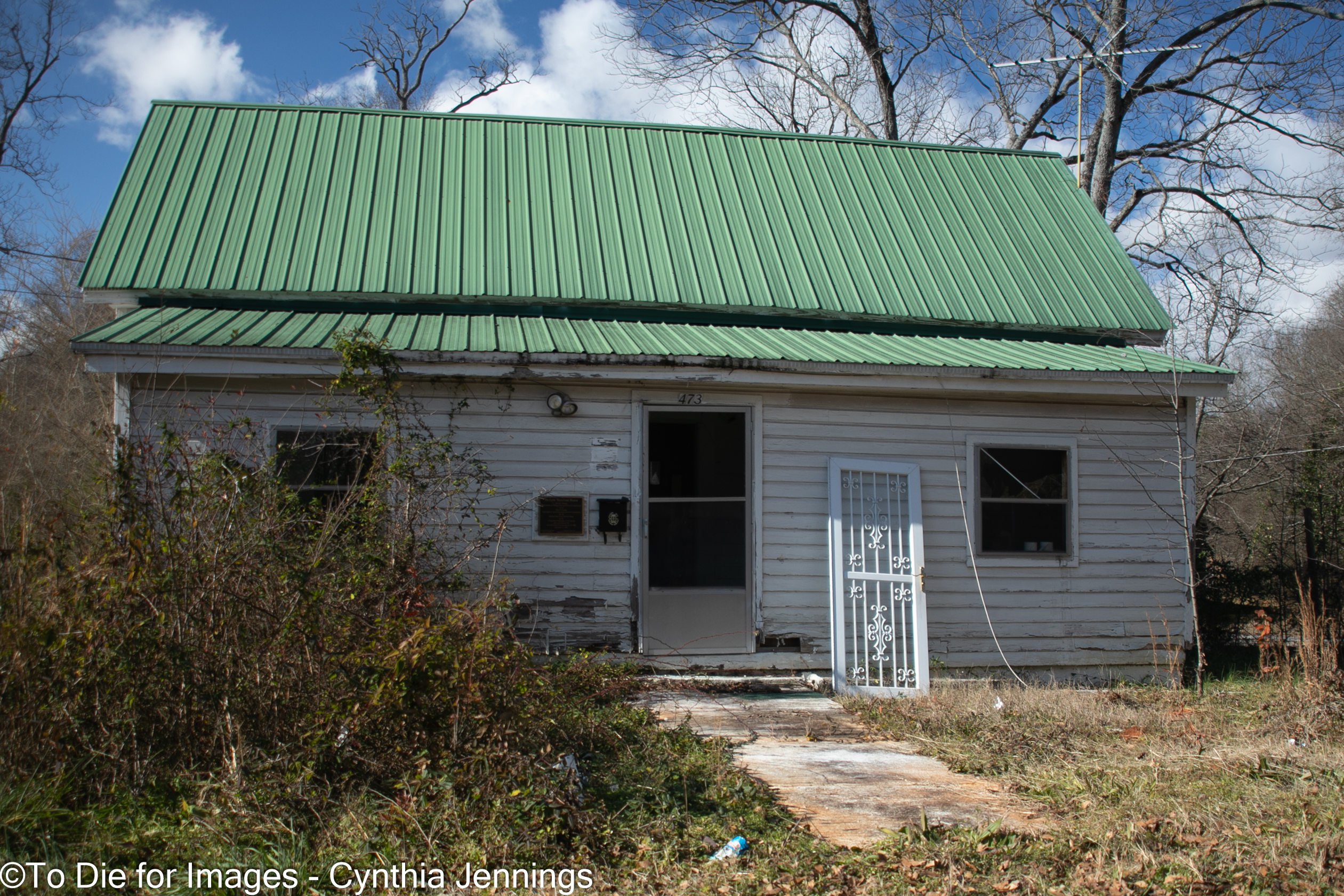

- Location within Georgia
- Location: 439 Rome St., Hartwell, Georgia
- Coordinates: 34°21′44″N 82°55′29″W
- Area: 3.4 acres (1.4 ha)
- Built: c.1902
- Built by: Morrison, Jackson
- Architectural style: Plain
- MPS: Hartwell MRA
- NRHP reference No.: 86002046
- Added to NRHP: September 11, 1986

The Jackson Morrison House, at 439 Rome St. in Hartwell, Georgia, was built around 1902. It was listed on the National Register of Historic Places in 1986. It has also been known as the Turner Property.

It is a one-story, frame, Plain-style house with a main gable roof and a rear ell.

It was built by Jackson Morrison, a black carpenter and farmer.
