= Scull Shoals, Georgia =

Community in the United States

Coordinates: 33°43′42″N 83°17′34″W

Scull Shoals is a former rapids and community on the Oconee River in Greene County, Georgia. It is an example of sedimentation due to unsustainable agricultural practices. Although the rapids and community are buried in silt, some remains of buildings are still visible. A nearby prehistoric earthworks and an area used for forestry research also bear the name "Scull Shoals". All of these features are in Oconee National Forest.

== Scull Shoals (geographical feature) ==
Scull Shoals was a rapids on the Oconee River. The rapids are no longer visible, having been buried in silt. In the Southeastern Piedmont, the term "shoals" is often used to describe a stretch of a river where rocks impede boat traffic. In 1775, the rapids likely consisted of a rocky place where the river fell at least four feet in a short distance. At that time, the river was stable, but as European settlement began, the river changed quickly. Agricultural practices, particularly cotton farming, caused extensive erosion upstream. By 1860, the rapids was completely buried in silt from the farms. Silt continued to accumulate until the 1920s, when cotton farming ended. The river is again stable, with the rapids underneath an estimated fourteen feet of silt.

== Scull Shoals Mounds ==
The area most likely received its name from prehistoric earthworks upstream. At the time of European settlement, erosion was exposing the skulls of indigenous persons buried there. However, the earthworks themselves have variously been known as Watson Springs Mound Site and Brightwell Mounds. Archaeologist Mark Kelly estimated most of the mound-building occurred in the late Etowah to Savannah periods (circa A. D. 1250). Work continued in the Lamar (late Mississippian) period. Presently, the earthworks are protected as part of Oconee National Forest.

== Scull Shoals (community) ==
European settlers took advantage of the water power available at the rapids. The first water-powered mills were established prior to 1809. At various times, the community hosted a grist mill, paper mill, cotton gin, and textile mill. The paper mill was notable as the first in the state of Georgia, having started in operation shortly after 1810. The community flourished for a period, largely because of cotton farming in the area. However, floods and silt from the same farms upstream became increasingly problematic. By the mid-1880s, water power had become infeasible, and the community declined thereafter.

Bruce K. Ferguson summarized the demise of the community:

The failure of Scull Shoals is not a story of the passing of and old antebellum civilization; it is a story of the functional relationship of land use. The Scull Shoals Mill was an integral part of the region's cotton economy. However, it was killed by the effects of the economic system that, for a while, gave the mill life, but ultimately disintegrated from its own abuses.

A post office called Scull Shoals was established in 1825, and remained in operation until 1861.

The United States Forest Service acquired the site of the community in 1936. The Forest Service operates the site as a historic recreation area. Although much of the community is buried in silt, remains of a mill and four-story brick warehouse are still visible. The flooding and silt continue to be a challenge managing the site.

== Scull Shoals Experimental Forest ==
A portion of Oconee National Forest is used for silviculture research. An example of research conducted at the Experimental Forest was littleleaf disease, which affects shortleaf pine trees.

== See also ==
Some other notable examples in the Georgia Piedmont:

- Providence Canyon State Park a spectacular example of erosion.
- Piedmont National Wildlife Refuge established to demonstrate that wildlife could be restored to heavily eroded farm land.
