= Springfield Baptist Church (Greensboro, Georgia) =

- U.S. National Register of Historic Places
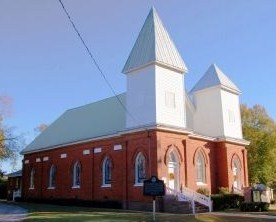

- Location within Georgia
- Location: Canaan Circle, Greensboro, Georgia
- Coordinates: 33.56885°N 83.17791°W
- Area: 1 acre (0.40 ha)
- Built: 1907
- Architectural style: Late Gothic Revival
- MPS: Greensboro MRA
- NRHP reference No.: 87001451
- Added to NRHP: September 9, 1987

The Springfield Baptist Church, on Canaan Circle in Greensboro, Georgia, was built in 1907. It was listed on the National Register of Historic Places in 1987.

It has rectangular towers at its front two corners.

It is a primarily black church formed as an 1864 split off the First Baptist Church of Greensboro, which continued as a whites-only church, after the American Civil War. It was the first black Baptist church in Greensboro.
