= Siloam, Georgia =

- Town
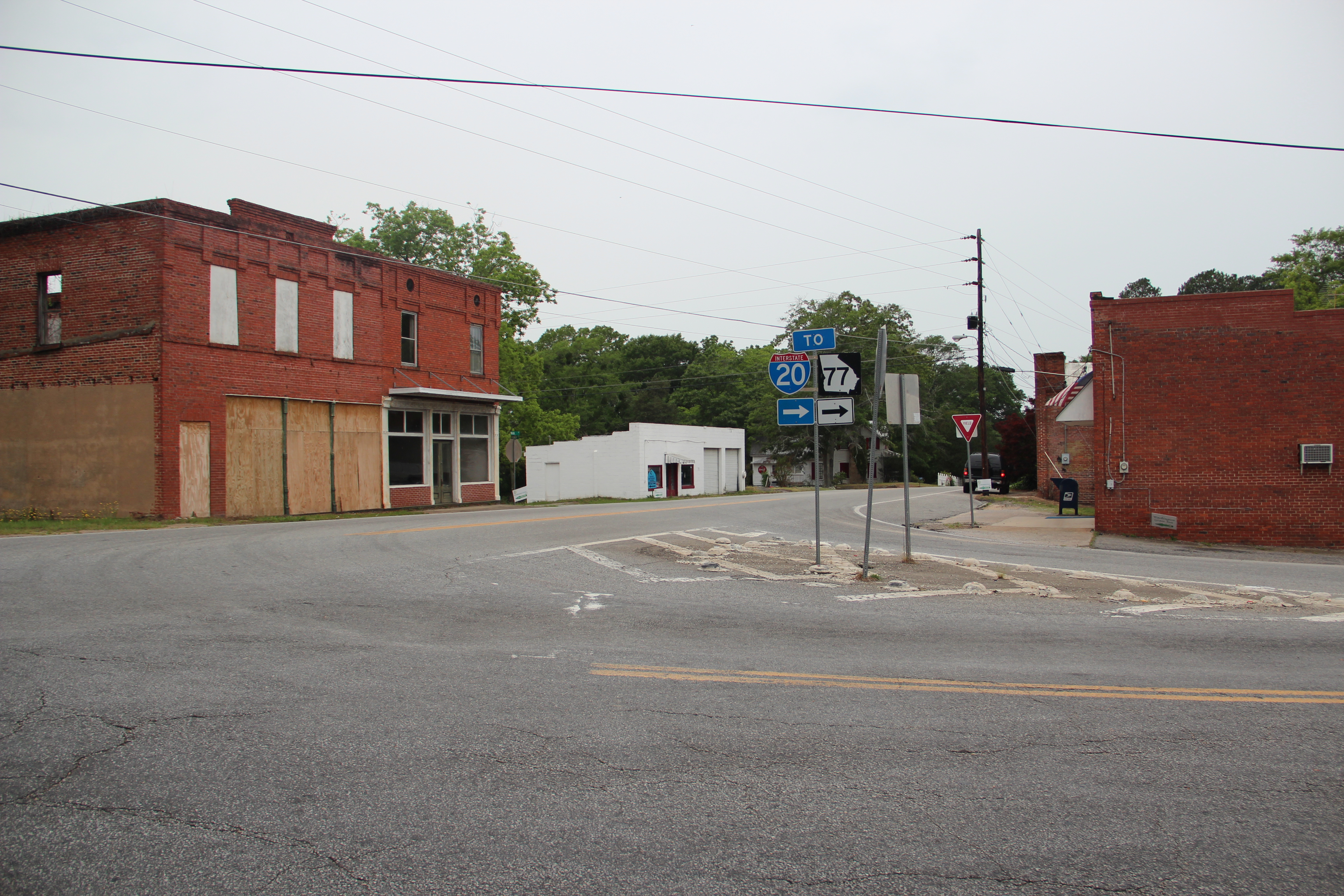
- Downtown Siloam

- Location in Greene County and the state of Georgia
- Coordinates: 33°32′8″N 83°4′50″W
- Country: United States
- State: Georgia
- County: Greene

Area
  - Total: 1.24 sq mi (3.22 km^{2})
  - Land: 1.21 sq mi (3.14 km^{2})
  - Water: 0.031 sq mi (0.08 km^{2})
- Elevation: 702 ft (214 m)

Population (2020)
  - Total: 194
  - Density: 159.8/sq mi (61.71/km^{2})
- Time zone: UTC-5 (Eastern (EST))
  - Summer (DST): UTC-4 (EDT)
- ZIP code: 30665
- Area code: 706
- FIPS code: 13-70932
- GNIS feature ID: 0356535

Siloam is a town in Greene County, Georgia, United States. As of the 2020 census, Siloam had a population of 194.

== History ==
Siloam was originally called "Smyrna", and under the latter name permanent settlement was first made in the 1840s. A post office called Siloam was established in 1871. The present name is after the ancient Siloam tunnel, a place mentioned in the Hebrew Bible.

== Geography ==
Siloam is located in eastern Greene County at 33°32′8″N 83°4′50″W (33.535691, -83.080443). Georgia State Route 15 passes through the town as Main Street, leading northwest 7 miles (11 km) to Greensboro, the county seat, and south 5.5 miles (8.9 km) to White Plains. State Route 77 leads north from the center of town 6 miles (10 km) to Union Point. Interstate 20 passes through the northern side of town, with access from Exit 138 (State Route 77). I-20 leads east 64 miles (103 km) to Augusta and west 80 miles (130 km) to Atlanta.

According to the United States Census Bureau, Siloam has a total area of 1.2 square miles (3.2 km^{2}), of which 0.031 square miles (0.08 km^{2}), or 2.38%, is water.

== Demographics ==
Historical population
Census	Pop.	Note	%±
1920	243		—
1930	269		10.7%
1940	318		18.2%
1950	324		1.9%
1960	321		−0.9%
1970	319		−0.6%
1980	446		39.8%
1990	329		−26.2%
2000	331		0.6%
2010	282		−14.8%
2020	194		−31.2%
U.S. Decennial Census; 1850-1870 1870-1880; 1890-1910 1920-1930; 1940 1950 1960; 1970 1980 1990; 2000 2010 2020

=== Racial and ethnic composition ===
Siloam town, Georgia – Racial and ethnic composition Note: the US Census treats Hispanic/Latino as an ethnic category. This table excludes Latinos from the racial categories and assigns them to a separate category. Hispanics/Latinos may be of any race.
Race / Ethnicity (NH = Non-Hispanic)	Pop 2000	Pop 2010	Pop 2020	% 2000	% 2010	% 2020
White alone (NH)	79	75	66	23.87%	26.60%	34.02%
Black or African American alone (NH)	242	199	110	73.11%	70.57%	56.70%
Native American or Alaska Native alone (NH)	0	0	0	0.00%	0.00%	0.00%
Asian alone (NH)	2	3	1	0.60%	1.06%	0.52%
Native Hawaiian or Pacific Islander alone (NH)	0	0	0	0.00%	0.00%	0.00%
Other race alone (NH)	0	0	0	0.00%	0.00%	0.00%
Mixed race or Multiracial (NH)	0	4	0	0.00%	1.42%	0.00%
Hispanic or Latino (any race)	8	1	17	2.42%	0.35%	8.76%
Total	331	282	194	100.00%	100.00%	100.00%

=== 2000 census ===
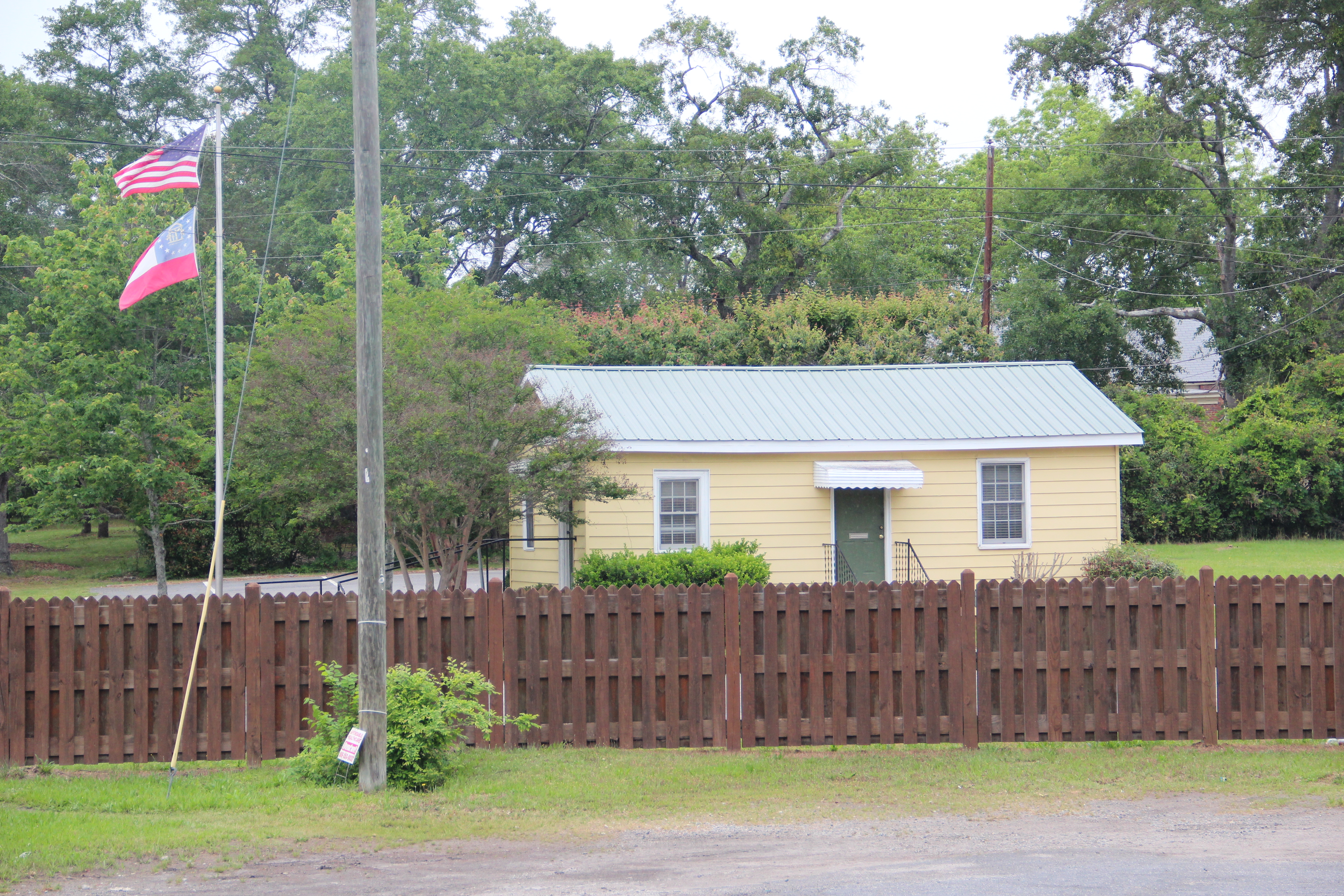
Town hall

As of the census of 2000, there were 331 people, 121 households, and 78 families residing in the town. The population density was 269.8 inhabitants per square mile (104.2/km^{2}). There were 144 housing units at an average density of 117.4 per square mile (45.3/km^{2}). The racial makeup of the town was 25.38% White, 73.11% African American, 0.60% Asian, 0.91% from other races. Hispanic or Latino of any race were 2.42% of the population.

There were 121 households, out of which 25.6% had children under the age of 18 living with them, 28.1% were married couples living together, 29.8% had a female householder with no husband present, and 35.5% were non-families. 28.9% of all households were made up of individuals, and 17.4% had someone living alone who was 65 years of age or older. The average household size was 2.74 and the average family size was 3.38.

In the town, the population was spread out, with 27.2% under the age of 18, 11.2% from 18 to 24, 22.1% from 25 to 44, 23.6% from 45 to 64, and 16.0% who were 65 years of age or older. The median age was 38 years. For every 100 females, there were 79.9 males. For every 100 females age 18 and over, there were 79.9 males.

The median income for a household in the town was $23,125, and the median income for a family was $24,792. Males had a median income of $21,250 versus $19,821 for females.

== Education ==
- Nathanael Greene Academy (private)
