= Union Point, Georgia =

- City
- Motto: "Living - Growing"
- Location in Greene County and the state of Georgia
- Coordinates: 33°36′59″N 83°4′26″W
- Country: United States
- State: Georgia
- County: Greene

Area
  - Total: 2.00 sq mi (5.19 km^{2})
  - Land: 1.97 sq mi (5.11 km^{2})
  - Water: 0.031 sq mi (0.08 km^{2})
- Elevation: 673 ft (205 m)

Population (2020)
  - Total: 1,597
  - Density: 809.7/sq mi (312.61/km^{2})
- Time zone: UTC-5 (Eastern (EST))
  - Summer (DST): UTC-4 (EDT)
- ZIP code: 30669
- Area code: 706
- FIPS code: 13-78380
- GNIS feature ID: 0356607
- Website: www.unionpointga.org

Union Point is a city in Greene County, Georgia, United States. As of the 2020 census, the city population was 1,597.

== History ==
Union Point was laid out in 1834, when the railroad was extended to that point. The name "Union Point" reflects the fact a railroad junction ("union" of rails) met at the site.

The Georgia General Assembly incorporated Union Point as a city in 1904.

== Geography ==
Union Point is located in eastern Greene County at 33°36′59″N 83°4′26″W (33.616263, -83.073905). U.S. Route 278 passes through the city as Lamb Avenue, leading east 11 miles (18 km) to Crawfordville and west 7 miles (11 km) to Greensboro, the Greene County seat. Georgia State Route 77 leads north 23 miles (37 km) to Lexington and south 5 miles (8 km) to Interstate 20 at Siloam, and State Route 44 leads northeast 22 miles (35 km) to Washington.

According to the United States Census Bureau, Union Point has a total area of 1.9 square miles (5.0 km^{2}), of which 0.03 square miles (0.07 km^{2}), or 1.34%, is water.

== Demographics ==
Historical population
Census	Pop.	Note	%±
1880	576		—
1910	1,363		—
1920	1,126		−17.4%
1930	1,627		44.5%
1940	1,566		−3.7%
1950	1,724		10.1%
1960	1,615		−6.3%
1970	1,624		0.6%
1980	1,750		7.8%
1990	1,753		0.2%
2000	1,669		−4.8%
2010	1,617		−3.1%
2020	1,597		−1.2%
U.S. Decennial Census; 1850-1870 1870-1880; 1890-1910 1920-1930; 1940 1950 1960; 1970 1980 1990; 2000 2010 2020

=== Racial and ethnic composition ===
Union Point, Georgia – Racial and ethnic composition Note: the US Census treats Hispanic/Latino as an ethnic category. This table excludes Latinos from the racial categories and assigns them to a separate category. Hispanics/Latinos may be of any race.
Race / Ethnicity (NH = Non-Hispanic)	Pop 2000	Pop 2010	Pop 2020	% 2000	% 2010	% 2020
White alone (NH)	849	657	534	50.87%	40.63%	33.44%
Black or African American alone (NH)	768	858	858	46.02%	53.06%	53.73%
Native American or Alaska Native alone (NH)	0	1	2	0.00%	0.06%	0.13%
Asian alone (NH)	11	5	15	0.66%	0.31%	0.94%
Native Hawaiian or Pacific Islander alone (NH)	0	0	0	0.00%	0.00%	0.00%
Other race alone (NH)	0	0	0	0.00%	0.00%	0.00%
Mixed race or Multiracial (NH)	0	11	48	0.00%	0.68%	3.01%
Hispanic or Latino (any race)	35	85	140	2.10%	5.26%	8.77%
Total	1,669	1,617	1,597	100.00%	100.00%	100.00%

=== 2020 census ===
As of the 2020 census, Union Point had a population of 1,597. The median age was 36.2 years. 26.9% of residents were under the age of 18 and 18.2% of residents were 65 years of age or older. For every 100 females there were 85.1 males, and for every 100 females age 18 and over there were 79.4 males age 18 and over.

0.0% of residents lived in urban areas, while 100.0% lived in rural areas.

There were 598 households in Union Point, of which 37.3% had children under the age of 18 living in them. Of all households, 30.4% were married-couple households, 17.1% were households with a male householder and no spouse or partner present, and 44.3% were households with a female householder and no spouse or partner present. About 29.2% of all households were made up of individuals and 11.8% had someone living alone who was 65 years of age or older.

There were 694 housing units, of which 13.8% were vacant. The homeowner vacancy rate was 2.8% and the rental vacancy rate was 4.9%.

=== 2000 Census ===
As of the census of 2000, there were 1,669 people, 651 households, and 421 families residing in the city. The population density was 811.4 inhabitants per square mile (313.3/km^{2}). There were 744 housing units at an average density of 361.7 per square mile (139.7/km^{2}). The racial makeup of the city was 51.47% White, 46.38% African American, 0.66% Asian, 0.84% from other races, and 0.66% from two or more races. Hispanic or Latino of any race were 2.10% of the population.

There were 651 households, out of which 32.4% had children under the age of 18 living with them, 35.3% were married couples living together, 24.0% had a female householder with no husband present, and 35.3% were non-families. 31.6% of all households were made up of individuals, and 13.5% had someone living alone who was 65 years of age or older. The average household size was 2.46 and the average family size was 3.08.

In the city, the population was spread out, with 26.7% under the age of 18, 9.7% from 18 to 24, 24.9% from 25 to 44, 21.7% from 45 to 64, and 17.0% who were 65 years of age or older. The median age was 37 years. For every 100 females, there were 85.4 males. For every 100 females age 18 and over, there were 77.2 males.

The median income for a household in the city was $26,384, and the median income for a family was $32,284. Males had a median income of $26,484 versus $20,071 for females. The per capita income for the city was $14,715. About 14.0% of families and 18.2% of the population were below the poverty line, including 27.1% of those under age 18 and 13.7% of those age 65 or over.

== Notable people ==
- Jennie Hart Sibley (1846–1917), president, Union Point Garden Club; president, Georgia W.C.T.U.; president, U.D.C.

== See also ==
- Jefferson Hall (Union Point, Georgia)
- Thornton House (Stone Mountain, Georgia)
