= Greene County, Georgia =

County in Georgia, United States

- County
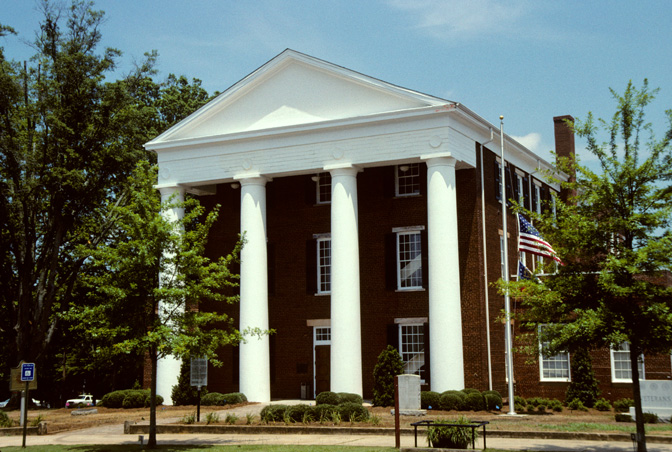
- Greene County courthouse in Greensboro

- Location within the U.S. state of Georgia
- Coordinates: 33°35′N 83°10′W
- Country: United States
- State: Georgia
- Founded: 1786; 240 years ago
- Named for: Nathanael Greene
- Seat: Greensboro
- Largest city: Greensboro

Area
  - Total: 406 sq mi (1,050 km^{2})
  - Land: 387 sq mi (1,000 km^{2})
  - Water: 19 sq mi (49 km^{2}) 4.6%

Population (2020)
  - Total: 18,915
  - Estimate (2025): 21,367 ▲
  - Density: 49/sq mi (19/km^{2})
- Time zone: UTC−5 (Eastern)
  - Summer (DST): UTC−4 (EDT)
- Congressional district: 10th
- Website: www.greenecountyga.gov

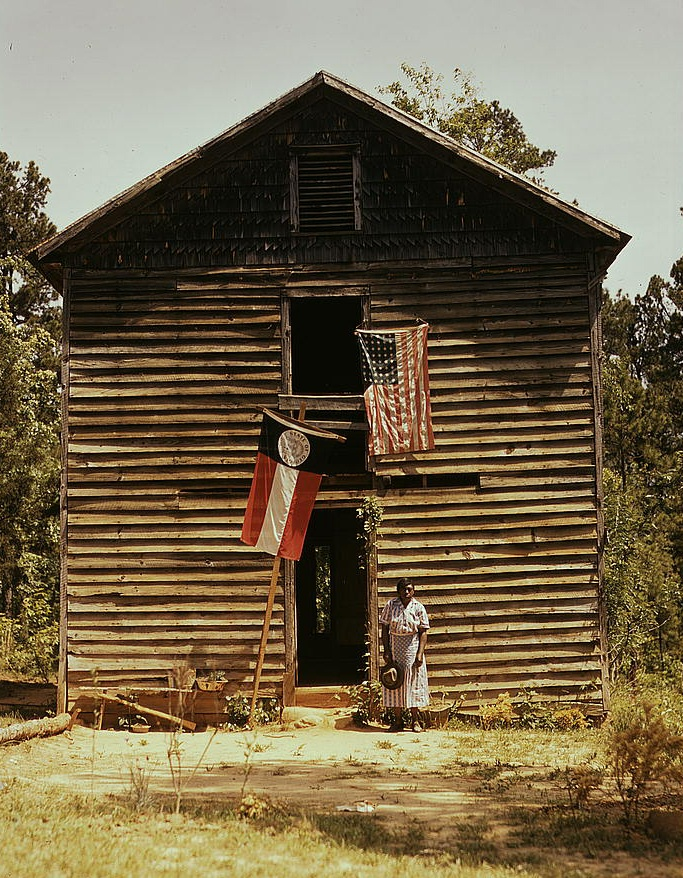
Unidentified building near White Plains, Georgia, ca. 1941

Greene County is a county located in the east central portion & the Lake country region of the U.S. state of Georgia. As of the 2020 census, the population was 18,915. The county seat is Greensboro. The county was created on February 3, 1786, and is named for Nathanael Greene, an American Revolutionary War major general.

== History ==
Greene County was formed on February 3, 1786, from land given by Washington County. It was named in honor of General Nathanael Greene, a hero of the American Revolutionary War.

== Geography ==
According to the U.S. Census Bureau, the county has a total area of 406 square miles (1,050 km^{2}), of which 387 square miles (1,000 km^{2}) is land and 19 square miles (49 km^{2}) (4.6%) is water.

The majority of Greene County, west of a line between Woodville, Union Point, and White Plains, is located in the Upper Oconee River sub-basin of the Altamaha River basin. The northern half of the remainder of the county is located in the Little River sub-basin of the Savannah River basin, while the southern half is located in the Upper Ogeechee River sub-basin of the Ogeechee River basin.

=== Major highways ===
- I-20 / SR 402 (unsigned)
- US 278 / SR 12
- SR 15
- SR 44
- SR 77

=== Adjacent counties ===
- Oglethorpe County (north)
- Taliaferro County (east)
- Hancock County (southeast)
- Putnam County (southwest)
- Morgan County (west)
- Oconee County (northwest)

=== National protected area ===
- Oconee National Forest (part)

== Communities ==
=== Cities ===
- Greensboro
- Union Point
- White Plains
- Woodville

=== Towns ===
- Siloam

=== Unincorporated communities ===
- Bairdstown

=== Other ===
- Scull Shoals, an extinct town on the Oconee River.

== Demographics ==
Historical population
Census	Pop.	Note	%±
1790	5,405		—
1800	10,761		99.1%
1810	11,679		8.5%
1820	13,589		16.4%
1830	12,549		−7.7%
1840	11,690		−6.8%
1850	13,068		11.8%
1860	12,652		−3.2%
1870	12,454		−1.6%
1880	17,547		40.9%
1890	17,051		−2.8%
1900	16,542		−3.0%
1910	18,512		11.9%
1920	18,972		2.5%
1930	12,616		−33.5%
1940	13,709		8.7%
1950	12,843		−6.3%
1960	11,193		−12.8%
1970	10,212		−8.8%
1980	11,391		11.5%
1990	11,793		3.5%
2000	14,406		22.2%
2010	15,994		11.0%
2020	18,915		18.3%
2025 (est.)	21,367	▲	13.0%
U.S. Decennial Census; 1790-1880 1890-1910; 1920-1930 1930-1940; 1940-1950 1960-1980; 1980-2000 2010 2020

=== Racial and ethnic composition ===
Greene County, Georgia – Racial and ethnic composition Note: the US Census treats Hispanic/Latino as an ethnic category. This table excludes Latinos from the racial categories and assigns them to a separate category. Hispanics/Latinos may be of any race.
Race / Ethnicity (NH = Non-Hispanic)	Pop 1980	Pop 1990	Pop 2000	Pop 2010	Pop 2020	% 1980	% 1990	% 2000	% 2010	% 2020
White alone (NH)	5,357	5,816	7,481	8,771	11,126	47.03%	49.32%	51.93%	54.84%	58.82%
Black or African American alone (NH)	5,875	5,867	6,356	6,078	5,783	51.58%	49.75%	44.12%	38.00%	30.57%
Native American or Alaska Native alone (NH)	14	13	32	38	28	0.12%	0.11%	0.22%	0.24%	0.15%
Asian alone (NH)	8	1	36	54	174	0.07%	0.01%	0.25%	0.34%	0.92%
Native Hawaiian or Pacific Islander alone (NH)	x	x	9	10	2	x	x	0.06%	0.06%	0.01%
Other race alone (NH)	2	0	15	15	58	0.02%	0.00%	0.10%	0.09%	0.31%
Mixed race or Multiracial (NH)	x	x	57	135	455	x	x	0.40%	0.84%	2.41%
Hispanic or Latino (any race)	135	96	420	893	1,289	1.19%	0.81%	2.92%	5.58%	6.81%
Total	11,391	11,793	14,406	15,994	18,915	100.00%	100.00%	100.00%	100.00%	100.00%

=== 2020 census ===
As of the 2020 census, there were 18,915 people, 7,874 households, and 4,975 families residing in the county. The median age was 51.6 years, with 18.8% under the age of 18 and 29.6% aged 65 or older. For every 100 females there were 93.4 males, and for every 100 females age 18 and over there were 90.8 males age 18 and over. None of the residents lived in urban areas and 100.0% lived in rural areas.

The racial makeup of the county was 59.7% White, 30.7% Black or African American, 0.2% American Indian and Alaska Native, 0.9% Asian, 0.0% Native Hawaiian and Pacific Islander, 3.7% from some other race, and 4.7% from two or more races. Hispanic or Latino residents of any race comprised 6.8% of the population.

Of the 7,874 households, 24.1% had children under the age of 18 living with them and 27.5% had a female householder with no spouse or partner present. About 24.7% of all households were made up of individuals and 13.1% had someone living alone who was 65 years of age or older. There were 10,087 housing units, of which 21.9% were vacant. Among occupied housing units, 76.3% were owner-occupied and 23.7% were renter-occupied. The homeowner vacancy rate was 1.9% and the rental vacancy rate was 6.9%.

== Education ==
The county supports the Greene County School Board, Lake Oconee Academy and Nathanael Greene Academy.

== Role in passage of the Georgia Indigent Defense Act ==
In 2001, Georgia Supreme Court Chief Justice Robert Benham convened a committee to investigate indigent defense in the state of Georgia. An avalanche of complaints about the state of public defense in Greene County, along with a number of lawsuits filed by Stephen Bright and the Southern Center for Human Rights, contributed to the formation of this commission. The commission discovered during its investigation that indigent defendants in Greene County were routinely pleaded guilty by judges without the presence of counsel and sometimes without even being present in court to make their pleas, violations of the Sixth Amendment. Excessive bail, e.g. $50,000 for loitering, was often set as well, a violation of the Eighth Amendment. After two years of investigation, the committee's recommendations led to the passage of the Georgia Indigent Defense Act.

== Politics ==
United States presidential election results for Greene County, Georgia
Year	Republican		Democratic		Third party(ies)	
Year	No.	%	No.	%	No.	%
1912	150	21.90%	525	76.64%	10	1.46%
1916	153	17.35%	676	76.64%	53	6.01%
1920	178	20.72%	681	79.28%	0	0.00%
1924	77	9.86%	558	71.45%	146	18.69%
1928	245	28.10%	627	71.90%	0	0.00%
1932	52	5.35%	918	94.44%	2	0.21%
1936	86	5.96%	1,348	93.35%	10	0.69%
1940	148	8.93%	1,497	90.29%	13	0.78%
1944	144	10.33%	1,246	89.38%	4	0.29%
1948	92	5.79%	1,213	76.29%	285	17.92%
1952	397	14.60%	2,323	85.40%	0	0.00%
1956	541	21.19%	2,012	78.81%	0	0.00%
1960	328	14.22%	1,979	85.78%	0	0.00%
1964	1,093	28.83%	2,698	71.17%	0	0.00%
1968	652	18.58%	1,635	46.58%	1,223	34.84%
1972	1,679	64.63%	919	35.37%	0	0.00%
1976	652	20.46%	2,534	79.54%	0	0.00%
1980	961	26.90%	2,571	71.96%	41	1.15%
1984	1,599	44.53%	1,992	55.47%	0	0.00%
1988	1,432	43.93%	1,818	55.77%	10	0.31%
1992	1,307	32.21%	2,259	55.67%	492	12.12%
1996	1,702	42.39%	2,115	52.68%	198	4.93%
2000	2,980	57.34%	2,137	41.12%	80	1.54%
2004	4,069	59.17%	2,774	40.34%	34	0.49%
2008	4,532	57.21%	3,339	42.15%	50	0.63%
2012	5,071	60.90%	3,201	38.44%	55	0.66%
2016	5,490	61.55%	3,199	35.87%	230	2.58%
2020	7,066	62.83%	4,087	36.34%	94	0.84%
2024	8,215	64.25%	4,514	35.30%	57	0.45%

United States Senate election results for Greene County, Georgia2
Year	Republican		Democratic		Third party(ies)	
Year	No.	%	No.	%	No.	%
2020	7,247	64.93%	3,763	33.71%	152	1.36%
2020	6,917	65.13%	3,703	34.87%	0	0.00%

United States Senate election results for Greene County, Georgia3
Year	Republican		Democratic		Third party(ies)	
Year	No.	%	No.	%	No.	%
2020	3,608	32.44%	2,572	23.12%	4,943	44.44%
2020	6,855	64.59%	3,758	35.41%	0	0.00%
2022	6,741	64.67%	3,527	33.84%	156	1.50%
2022	6,278	64.86%	3,401	35.14%	0	0.00%

Georgia Gubernatorial election results for Greene County
Year	Republican		Democratic		Third party(ies)	
Year	No.	%	No.	%	No.	%
2022	7,402	70.44%	3,060	29.12%	46	0.44%

Prior to 2000, the only time Greene County failed to back a Democratic Party candidate in a presidential election was in 1972, when Richard Nixon won every county in Georgia and all but 130 counties nationwide. From 2000 onward, it has been consistently Republican due to the growth of white residents moving to Reynolds Lake Oconee.

As of the 2020s, Greene County is a strongly Republican voting county, voting 64% for Donald Trump in 2024. For elections to the United States House of Representatives, Greene County is part of Georgia's 10th congressional district, currently represented by Mike Collins. For elections to the Georgia State Senate, Greene County is part of District 24. For elections to the Georgia House of Representatives, Greene County is part of District 124.

== See also ==
- National Register of Historic Places listings in Greene County, Georgia
- List of counties in Georgia
