= Greensboro, Georgia =

- City
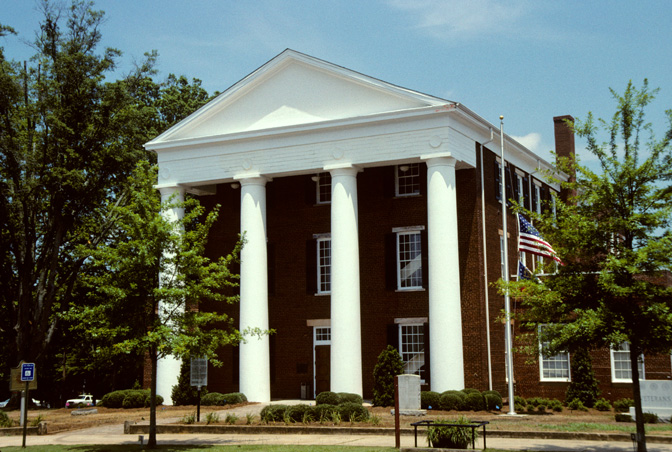
- Greene County Courthouse in Greensboro

- Location in Greene County and the state of Georgia
- Coordinates: 33°34′18″N 83°10′51″W
- Country: United States
- State: Georgia
- County: Greene

Area
  - Total: 6.97 sq mi (18.06 km^{2})
  - Land: 6.91 sq mi (17.89 km^{2})
  - Water: 0.066 sq mi (0.17 km^{2})
- Elevation: 640 ft (195 m)

Population (2020)
  - Total: 3,648K
  - Density: 528.1/sq mi (203.91/km^{2})
- Time zone: UTC-5 (Eastern (EST))
  - Summer (DST): UTC-4 (EDT)
- ZIP code: 30642
- Area code: Area code 706
- FIPS code: 13-34876
- GNIS feature ID: 0356104
- Website: www.greensboroga.gov

Greensboro is a city in and the county seat of Greene County, Georgia, United States. Its population was 3,648 as of the 2020 census. The city is located approximately halfway between Atlanta and Augusta on Interstate 20.

== History ==
Greensboro was founded circa 1780; in 1787, it was designated the seat of the newly formed Greene County. It was incorporated as a town in 1803 and as a city in 1855. The city was named for Major General Nathanael Greene, commander of the rebel American forces at the Battle of Guilford Court House on March 15, 1781.

== Geography ==
Greensboro is located at the center of Greene County at 33°34′18″N 83°10′51″W (33.571528, -83.180921). U.S. Route 278 passes through the city center as Broad Street, leading east 7 miles (11 km) to Union Point and west 19 miles (31 km) to Madison. Georgia State Route 44 leads southwest from Greensboro 22 miles (35 km) to Eatonton. State Route 15 leads north 34 miles (55 km) to Athens and southeast 27 miles (43 km) to Sparta. The city limits extend southwest along SR 44 for 4 miles (6 km) so as to include Exit 130 on Interstate 20. I-20 leads east 70 miles (110 km) to Augusta and west 73 miles (117 km) to Atlanta.

According to the U.S. Census Bureau, Greensboro has a total area of 6.8 square miles (17.6 km^{2}), of which 6.7 square miles (17.4 km^{2}) is land and 0.1 square miles (0.2 km^{2}), or 0.99%, is water. The city is in the Oconee River watershed and is located 5 miles (8 km) east of Lake Oconee and 2 miles (3 km) southeast of Oconee National Forest.

== Demographics ==
Historical population
Census	Pop.	Note	%±
1810	411		—
1840	763		—
1870	913		—
1880	1,621		77.5%
1890	1,313		−19.0%
1900	1,511		15.1%
1910	2,120		40.3%
1920	2,128		0.4%
1930	2,125		−0.1%
1940	2,459		15.7%
1950	2,688		9.3%
1960	2,773		3.2%
1970	2,583		−6.9%
1980	2,985		15.6%
1990	2,860		−4.2%
2000	3,238		13.2%
2010	3,359		3.7%
2020	3,648		8.6%
U.S. Decennial Census; 1850-1870 1870-1880; 1890-1910 1920-1930; 1940 1950 1960; 1970 1980 1990; 2000 2010

=== 2020 census ===
As of the 2020 census, Greensboro had a population of 3,648. There were 1,379 households and 808 families residing in the city. The median age was 36.4 years. 26.5% of residents were under the age of 18 and 15.3% were 65 years of age or older. For every 100 females there were 90.9 males, and for every 100 females age 18 and over there were 84.1 males age 18 and over.

0.0% of residents lived in urban areas, while 100.0% lived in rural areas.

Of households in Greensboro, 37.5% had children under the age of 18 living in them. Of all households, 28.6% were married-couple households, 20.4% were households with a male householder and no spouse or partner present, and 43.1% were households with a female householder and no spouse or partner present. About 29.0% of all households were made up of individuals and 12.0% had someone living alone who was 65 years of age or older.

There were 1,516 housing units, of which 9.0% were vacant. The homeowner vacancy rate was 1.1% and the rental vacancy rate was 3.7%.

Greensboro racial composition as of 2020
Race	Num.	Perc.
White (non-Hispanic)	802	21.98%
Black or African American (non-Hispanic)	2,196	60.2%
Native American	6	0.16%
Asian	43	1.18%
Other/mixed	81	2.22%
Hispanic or Latino	520	14.25%

== Education ==
=== Greene County School District ===
The Greene County School District holds pre-school to grade twelve, and consists of two elementary schools, a middle school, a high school, and a charter school. The district has 158 full-time teachers and over 2,280 students.

- Greensboro Elementary
- Union Point Elementary
- Anita White Carson Middle School
- Greene County High School
- Lake Oconee Academy

The area also hosts the private school Nathanael Greene Academy.

== Notable people ==
- Thomas W. Cobb, former U.S. representative and senator, and judge of the superior court of Georgia; namesake of Cobb County, Georgia
- William Crosby Dawson, former congressman and U.S. senator from Georgia; born, died, and buried in Greensboro
- Foogiano, rapper signed to 1017 Records, born in Greensboro
- Augustus Baldwin Longstreet, lawyer and early American humorist writer, represented Greene County in the state legislature in 1821
- Mickey Mantle, center fielder for the New York Yankees, member of the Baseball Hall of Fame, lived in Greensboro during his final years after retiring from the Yankees
- McKinley Neal, Missouri State Legislator
- Joshua Nesbitt, former starting quarterback for the Georgia Tech football team
- Joseph Parker Jr., last surviving U.S. Navy physician who participated in the Allied invasion of Omaha Beach
- John Perkins Ralls, Confederate congressman from Alabama, born in Greensboro
- Tim Simpson, professional golfer, lives in Greensboro
- Sonny Terry, blues and folk musician known for his energetic harmonica style, born in Greensboro
