= List of African-American officeholders (1865–1899) =

More than 1,500 African-American officeholders served during the Reconstruction era (1865–1877) and in the years after Reconstruction before white supremacy, disenfranchisement, and the Democratic Party fully reasserted control in Southern states. Historian Canter Brown Jr. noted that in some states, such as Florida, the highest number of African Americans were elected or appointed to offices after the end of Reconstruction in 1877. The following is a partial list of African-American officeholders from the end of the Civil War until 1899. Dates listed are the year that a term starts or the range of years served if multiple terms.

== U.S. Senate ==
- Blanche Bruce – Mississippi 1875–1881
- P. B. S. Pinchback – Louisiana 1873, elected but the Senate refused to seat him (also Louisiana Lt. Governor, Louisiana Senate, acting Louisiana Governor, Louisiana Constitutional Convention)
- Hiram R. Revels – Mississippi 1870 (also Mississippi Secretary of State)

== U.S. House of Representatives ==
- Richard H. Cain – South Carolina 1873–1875, 1877–1879 (also South Carolina Senate, House, Constitutional Congress)
- Henry P. Cheatham – North Carolina 1889–1894
- Robert C. De Large – South Carolina 1871–1873 (also South Carolina House, South Carolina Constitutional Convention, and State Land Commissioner)
- Robert B. Elliott – South Carolina 1871–1874 (also South Carolina House, South Carolina Attorney General, South Carolina Constitutional Convention, South Carolina Senate, city council)
- Jeremiah Haralson – Alabama 1875–1877 (also Alabama Senate and Alabama House)
- John Adams Hyman – North Carolina 1875–1877 (also North Carolina Senate and North Carolina Constitutional Convention)
- John Mercer Langston – Virginia 1890–1891 (also U.S. Minister to Haiti)
- Jefferson F. Long – Georgia 1871
- John R. Lynch – Mississippi 1873–1877, 1882–1883 (also speaker of the Mississippi House)
- John Willis Menard – Louisiana 1868, elected but not seated
- Thomas E. Miller – South Carolina September 24, 1890 – March 3, 1891 (also South Carolina Senate, South Carolina House, and South Carolina Constitutional Convention)
- George W. Murray – South Carolina 1893–1897
- Charles E. Nash – Louisiana 1875 –1877
- James E. O'Hara – North Carolina 1883–1887 (also North Carolina House)
- Samuel Peters – Louisiana, 1872 elected but died before being seated
- Joseph H. Rainey – South Carolina 1870–1879 (also South Carolina Senate and South Carolina Constitutional Convention)
- Alonzo J. Ransier – South Carolina 1873–1875 (also South Carolina Lt. Governor and Constitutional Convention)
- James T. Rapier – Alabama 1873–1875 (also Alabama Constitutional Convention)
- Robert Smalls – South Carolina 1875–1879, 1882–1887 (also South Carolina Senate, South Carolina House, and Constitutional Convention)
- Benjamin Sterling Turner – Alabama 1871–1873
- Josiah T. Walls – Florida 1871–1876 (also Florida House, Florida Senate, and Florida Constitutional Convention)
- George Henry White – North Carolina 1897–1901 (also North Carolina House and North Carolina Senate)

== Alabama ==
Between 1868 and 1878, more than 100 African Americans served in the Alabama Legislature.

=== Alabama Senate ===
- Alexander H. Curtis – Perry County 1872–1876 (also Alabama House and Alabama Constitutional Convention)
- D. J. Daniels – Russell County 1872
- James K. Greene – Hale County 1874–1876 (also Alabama House)
- Jeremiah Haralson – Dallas County 1872–1876 (also Alabama House and U.S. Congress)
- John W. Jones – Lowndes County 1872–1876
- Lloyd Leftwich – Greene County 1872–1876
- Benjamin F. Royal – Bullock County 1868–1876

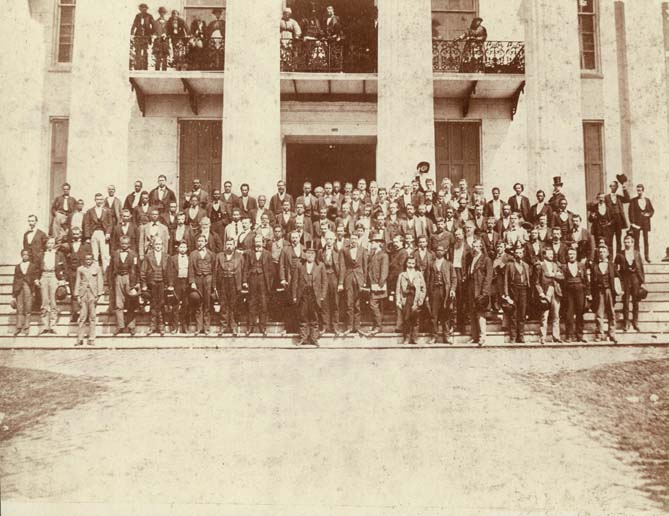
Alabama legislators at the capitol in 1872

=== Alabama House of Representatives ===
- Benjamin F. Alexander – Greene County 1868 (also Alabama Constitutional Convention)
- G. W. Allen – Bullock County 1874
- James H. Alston – Macon County 1868–1879
- Matt Avery – Perry County 1867
- Elijah Baldwin – Wilcox County 1874–1878
- Granville Bennett – Sumter County 1874
- Samuel Blandon – Lee County 1868
- William H. Blevins – Dallas County 1874–1878
- James Bliss – Sumter County 1874
- Matthew Boyd – Perry County 1874
- George W. Braxdell – Talladega County 1870
- Nathan A. Brewington – Lowndes County 1868
- Richard Burke – Sumter County 1868
- John Carraway – Mobile County 1868 (Speaker of the House)
- Hugh A. Carson – Lowndes County 1876–1880 (also Alabama Constitutional Convention)
- William E. Carson – Lowndes County 1872
- Hershel V. Cashin – Montgomery County 1874–1878
- Thomas Clark – Barbour County 1870
- Thomas J. Clarke – Barbour County 1872
- Henry A. Cochran – Dallas County 1870, 1872
- Elijah Cook – Montgomery County 1874
- George Cox – Montgomery County 1868
- Henry H. Craig – Montgomery County 1870
- Alexander H. Curtis – Perry County 1870 (also Alabama Senate and Alabama Constitutional Convention)
- D. J. Daniels – Russell County 1874
- Thomas Diggs – Barbour County 1868–1872 (also Alabama Constitutional Convention)
- Mentor Dotson – Sumter County 1872
- John Dozier – Perry County 1870–1874
- Joseph Drawn – Dallas County 1868
- Hales Ellsworth – Montgomery County 1872
- George English – Wilcox County 1878
- Charles Fagan – Montgomery County 1874
- Samuel Fantroy – Barbour County 1872
- Adam Gachet – Barbour County 1874
- Prince Gardner – Russell County 1874
- William Gaskin – Lowndes County 1870–1876
- Edward Gee – Dallas County 1870
- Captain Gilmer – Montgomery County 1876
- Joseph H. Goldsby – Dallas County 1872
- James K. Greene – Hale County 1868–1874 (also Alabama Senate)
- Ovide Gregory – Mobile County 1868 (also Alabama Constitutional Convention)
- Jeremiah Haralson – Dallas County 1870 (also Alabama Senate and U.S. Congress)
- Charles E. Harris – Dallas County 1874
- Charles O. Harris – Montgomery County 1876
- D. H. Hill – Bullock County 1868
- George Houston – Sumter County 1868
- Benjamin Inge – Sumter County 1868
- A. W. Johnson – Macon County 1874
- R. L. Johnson – Dallas County 1870–1874
- Green T. Johnston – Dallas County 1876
- Columbus Jones – Madison County 1868 (also Alabama Constitutional Convention)
- Reuben Jones – Madison County 1872
- Shandy W. Jones – Tuscaloosa County 1868
- Horace King – Russell County 1868–1872
- David Law – Barbour County 1868
- Samuel Lee – Lowndes County 1874
- Thomas Lee – Perry County 1868
- Greene S. W. Lewis – Perry County 1868, 1872–1878 (also Alabama Constitutional Convention)
- Edwin C. Locke – Wilcox County 1874
- Jacob Martin – Dallas County 1874
- Perry Matthews – Bullock County 1872–1876
- January Maull – Lowndes County 1872
- Jefferson McCalley – Madison County 1868
- Willis Merriwether – Wilcox County 1872–1876
- G. R. Miller – Russell County 1872
- Edward Odum – Barbour County 1874
- George Patterson – Macon County 1872–1876
- Samuel J. Patterson – Autauga County 1872
- Robert Reed – Sumter County 1872–1876
- Bristo W. Reese – Hale County 1872–1876
- H. W. W. Rice – Talladega County 1868
- A. G. Richardson – Wilcox County 1868
- Henry St. Clair – Macon County 1870–1874
- James Shaw – Mobile County 1868
- Charles Smith – Bullock County 1874
- Nimrod Snoddy – Greene County 1876
- Lawrence S. Speed – Bullock County 1868–1874
- Lawson Steele – Montgomery County 1872
- William J. Stevens – Dallas County 1876
- W. L. Taylor – Chambers County 1868
- William Taylor – Sumter County 1872
- Holland Thompson – Montgomery County 1868–1872
- Frank H. Threatt – Marengo County
- J. R. Treadwell – Russell County 1872
- William V. Turner – Elmore County 1868
- Mansfield Tyler – Lowndes County 1870
- Thomas H. Walker – Dallas County 1872
- Spencer Weaver – Dallas County 1868
- Levi Wells – Marengo County 1870
- A. E. Williams – Barbour County 1872–1876
- L. J. Williams – Montgomery County 1868–1874
- J. R. Witherspoon – Perry County 1874
- Manly Wynne – Hale County 1874
- Henry Young – Lowndes County 1868

=== Alabama Constitutional Convention ===
- Benjamin F. Alexander – Greene County 1867 (also Alabama House)
- Moses B. Avery – Montgomery County 1867
- Samuel Blanden – Lee County 1867
- John Carroway – Mobile County 1867
- Hugh A. Carson – Lowndes County 1875 (also Alabama House)
- Alexander H. Curtis – Perry County 1875 (also Alabama House and Alabama Senate)
- Thomas Diggs – Barbour County 1867 (also Alabama House)
- Peyton Finley – Montgomery County 1867
- J. K. Greene – Hale County 1867
- Ovid Gregory – Mobile County 1867 (also Alabama House)
- Jack Hatcher – Dallas County 1867
- Benjamin Inge – Sumter County 1867
- Washington Johnson – Russell County 1867
- Columbus Jones – Madison County 1867 (also Alabama House)
- L. S. Latham – Bullock County 1867
- Thomas Lee – Perry County 1867
- Greene S. W. Lewis – Perry County 1875 (also Alabama House)
- B. F. Royal – Bullock County 1867
- Henry Stokes – Dallas County 1867

=== Other state offices ===
- William Hooper Councill – assistant engrossing clerk in the Alabama Legislature 1872, 1874
- Phillip Joseph – engrossing clerk in the Alabama Legislature 1872

=== Federal offices ===
- Granville Bennett – postmaster of Catherine September 1, 1890 – January 15, 1891
- John P. Billingsley – postmaster of Marion March 25, 1874 – July 18, 1882
- Charles W. Childs – postmaster of Marion February 12, 1890 – October 28, 1893
- James F. Childs – postmaster of Marion July 18, 1882 – December 5, 1885
- Anthony R. Davison – postmaster of Lovan August 1, 1889 – October 28, 1891; March 28, 1890 – April 17, 1893
- John W. Davison – postmaster of Lovan March 25, 1890 – October 28, 1891
- Howell L. Goins – postmaster of Northport November 25, 1889 – March 17, 1890
- Rufus L. Gomez – postmaster of Luverne March 28, 1889 – October 5, 1889
- Jordan Hatcher – postmaster of Cahaba September 7, 1869 – September 26, 1882
- John W. Jones – postmaster of Hayneville June 6, 1882 – October 17, 1887

=== Local offices ===
- S. L. David – mayor of Hobson City 1899

== Arkansas ==
Between 1868 and 1893, 85 men noted as "colored" or "mulatto" were elected to the Arkansas legislature. Initially, they served under the 1868 Arkansas Constitution that granted them the right to vote and hold office. The Democrats retook control of the state government and instituted the 1874 Constitution. As a result, after 1893, the next African American to serve as an Arkansas state legislator was in 1973.

=== Arkansas Senate ===
- George W. Bell – Desha and Chicot counties 1891, 1893
- Richard A. Dawson – Jefferson County 1873, 1874 (also Arkansas House)
- William Henry Grey – Phillips County 1875 (also Arkansas House, Arkansas Constitutional Convention, and Arkansas Commissioner of Immigration and State Lands)
- Samuel H. Holland – Ashley, Chicot, Drew, and Desha counties 1873, 1874
- W. H. Logan – Chicot and Desha counties 1887, 1889
- James W. Mason – Ashley, Chicot, Drew, Desha and counties 1868, 1871 (also Arkansas Constitutional Convention, postmaster, and judge)
- Anthony Stanford – Lee and Phillips counties 1877, 1879
- James T. White – Phillips and Monroe counties 1871 (also Arkansas House and Arkansas Constitutional Convention)
- Ruben B. White – Pulaski and White counties 1873, 1874
- John Willis Williams – Phillips County 1874

=== Arkansas House of Representatives ===
- Benjamin Frank Adair – Pulaski County 1891
- James M. Alexander – Phillips County 1871 (also justice of the peace)
- Isaac George Bailey – Desha County 1885
- Conway Barbour – Lafayette County 1871
- Austin Barrow – Phillips County 1871
- Peter H. Booth – Jefferson County 1893
- Levi B. Boston – Jefferson County 1874
- Joseph H. Bradford – Mississippi County 1885
- Joseph B. Brooks – Lafayette County 1885
- Cornelius "Neal" Brown – Pulaski County 1873
- Crockett Brown – Lee County 1877
- Hal B. Burton – Jefferson County 1887
- John H. Carr – Phillips County 1889–1894
- Barry Coleman – Phillips County 1874 and 1877
- William L. Copeland – Crittenden County 1873–1875
- Lawrence Crute – Chicot County 1873
- Richard A. Dawson – Jefferson County 1879 (also Arkansas Senate)
- Sebron Williams Dawson – Jefferson County 1889–1892
- Jacob N. Donohoo – Phillips County 1877, 1887–1892
- Anderson Ebberson – Jefferson County 1877, 1881
- Nathan E. Edwards – Chicot County 1893
- Edward Allen Fulton – Drew County 1871 (also postmaster)
- William Hines Furbush – Phillips County 1873, Lee County 1879
- Isaac Gillam – Pulaski County 1879
- Ed Glover – Jefferson County 1885
- William E. Gray – Pulaski County 1881
- William Henry Grey – Phillips County 1868 (also Arkansas Senate, Arkansas Constitutional Convention, and Arkansas Commissioner of Immigration and State Lands)
- Toney Grissom – Phillips County 1873–1875
- Jeff Haskins – St. Francis County 1871
- Ferdinand "Ferd" Havis – Jefferson County 1873
- Monroe E. Hawkins – Lafayette County 1868, 1873, 1874 (also Arkansas Constitutional Convention)
- Ned Hill – Jefferson County 1874
- Daniel Hunt – Hempstead County 1868
- William B. Jacko – Jefferson County 1885, 1887
- Ed Jefferson – Jefferson County 1887, 1889
- Adam R. Johnson – Crittenden County 1871
- Henry Augustus Johnson – Chicot County 1891
- John H. Johnson – Woodruff County 1873
- Green Hill Jones – Chicot County 1885, 1889
- Thomas R. Kersh – Lincoln County 1885, 1887
- Daniel W. Lewis – Crittenden County 1883
- George W. Lowe – Monroe County 1889–1892
- John G. Lucas – Jefferson County 1891
- William A. Marshall – Hempstead County 1873
- L. J. Maxwell – Jefferson County 1874–1875
- Americus Mayo – Monroe County 1871
- Charles Howard McKay – Jefferson County 1893
- Abraham H. Miller – Phillips County 1874
- William Murphy – Jefferson County 1873, 1877 (also Arkansas Constitutional Convention)
- Marshall M. Murray – Lafayette County 1883
- Hugh C. Newsome – Chicot County 1887
- Sandy Shepard Odum – Crittenden County 1887
- William C. Payne – Jefferson County 1879, 1881
- Burns Polk – Lee County 1873
- Carl R. Polk – Jefferson County 1871, 1881 (also a justice of the peace)
- Patrick T. Price – Lee County 1877
- James A. Robinson – Ashley, Chicot, Drew, Desha counties 1871, 1874
- Henry H. Robinson – Phillips County 1873
- John C. Rollins – Ashley, Chicot, Drew, Desha counties 1873
- Anderson Louis Rush – Pulaski County 1868–1869
- Granville Ryles – Pulaski County 1883
- Richard R. Samuels – Hempstead County 1868, 1869 (also Arkansas Constitutional Convention)
- Francis H. Sawyer – Lincoln County 1877
- Samuel H. Scott – Jefferson County 1885
- Archie Shepperson – Hempstead County 1873
- Rusty Sherrill – Jefferson County 1883
- George H. W. Stewart – Phillips County 1873
- Green W. Thompson – Pulaski County 1889
- George E. Trower – Conway County 1887
- G. W. Watson – Crittenden County 1891
- Blackstone Waterhouse – Jefferson County, Arkansas 1883
- John W. Webb – Ashley, Chicot, Drew, Desha counties 1871
- Reuben C. Weddington – Desha County 1891
- Francis "Frank" W. White – Pulaski County 1883
- James T. White – Phillips and Monroe counties 1868–1870 (also Arkansas Senate and Arkansas Constitutional Convention)
- Henry W./N. Williams – Lincoln County 1889, 1891
- John Willis Williams – Phillips County 1873 (also Arkansas Senate)
- James Wofford – Crittenden County 1877
- S. L. Woolfolk – Jefferson County 1891
- William H. Young – Jefferson County 1871, 1883

=== Arkansas Constitutional Convention ===
- William Henry Grey – Phillips County 1868 (also Arkansas Senate, Arkansas House, and Arkansas Commissioner of Immigration and State Lands)
- Monroe E. Hawkins – Lafayette County 1868 (also Arkansas House)
- Thomas P. Johnson – Little Rock 1868
- James W. Mason – Chicot County 1868 (also Arkansas Senate, postmaster, and judge)
- William Murphy – Jefferson County 1868 (also Arkansas House)
- W. Henry Rector – Little Rock 1868
- Richard R. Samuels – Washington County 1868 (also Arkansas House)
- James T. White – Phillips County 1868 and 1874 (also Arkansas House, Arkansas Senate, and Arkansas Commissioner of Public Works)

=== Other state offices ===
- Joseph Carter Corbin – Arkansas Superintendent of Public Schools 1873–1875
- William Henry Grey – Arkansas Commissioner of Immigration and State Lands (also Arkansas House, Arkansas Senate, and Arkansas Constitutional Convention)
- James T. White – Arkansas Commissioner of Public Works (also Arkansas House, Arkansas Senate, and Arkansas Constitutional Convention)

=== Federal offices ===
- Elisha Davis – postmaster of Sweet Home November 8, 1881 – May 24, 1893
- Edward Allen Fulton – postmaster of Monticello March 1, 1871 – March 29, 1874; May 29, 1871 – December 17, 1875 (also Arkansas House)
- Mifflin Wistar Gibbs – American consul to Madagascar 1897 (also judge)
- William H. Lacy – postmaster of Harwood Island February 16, 1885 – August 2, 1893
- James W. Mason – postmaster of Sunny Side February 2, 1867 – April 11, 1871 (also Arkansas Senate, probate judge, and sheriff)
- James A. Roper – postmaster of Surrounded Hill May 9, 1889 – June 22, 1893
- William A. Sloan – postmaster of Ripley July 16, 1891 – April 14, 1894

=== Local offices ===
- Mifflin Wistar Gibbs – Little Rock judge 1873 (also consul)
- James W. Mason – probate judge, Chicot County sheriff 1872–1874 (also Arkansas Senate and postmaster)
- Carl R. Polk – Jefferson County justice of the peace (also Arkansas House)

== California ==
=== Local offices ===
- Edward P. Duplex – mayor of Wheatland 1888

== Colorado ==
=== Colorado House of Representatives ===
- John T. Gunnell – Arapahoe County 1881
- Joseph H. Stuart – Arapahoe County 1895

=== Other state offices ===
- Henry O. Wagoner – clerk in the Colorado Legislature 1876

== District of Columbia ==
=== Federal offices ===
- Ebenezer Bassett – 1869–1877
- Francis Lewis Cardozo – U.S. Postal Service auditor for the United States Department of the Treasury 1878–1888 (also South Carolina Secretary of State, South Carolina Treasurer, and South Carolina Constitutional Convention)
- John Mercer Langston – U.S. Minister to Haiti 1877–1885 (also U.S. Congress)
- William E. Matthews – clerk in the United States Postal Service 1870–1881 (Note: William E. Matthews was the first African American to receive an appointment in the United States Postal Service.)
- James Carroll Napier – State Department Clerk (also Nashville Board of Aldermen)

=== Local offices ===
- Anthony Bowen – Ward 7 Common Council 1879
- Solomon G. Brown – House of Delegates 1871–1874
- Blanche Bruce – Recorder of Deeds February 7, 1890 – May 26, 1894
- Henry P. Cheatham – Recorder of Deeds 1897 – 1901
- John F. Cook – Ward 1 Board of Aldermen 1868 and city registrar 1869
- Frederick Douglass – Recorder of Deeds May 17, 1881 – August 19, 1886
- Walker A. Freeman – Ward 1 Common Council 1870
- Frank B. Gaines – Ward 6 Common Council 1869, 1870
- Thomas A. Grant – Ward 5 Common Council 1870
- John T. Johnson – Ward 3 Common Council 1869; reading clerk for Common Council
- James Campbell Matthews – Recorder of Deeds August 19, 1886 – March 3, 1887
- Benjamin McCoy – Ward 4 Common Council 187
- Sampson Netter – Ward 7 Common Council 1869
- Henry H. Piper – Ward 2 Common Council 1869, 1870
- George W. Ratton – Ward 4 Common Council 1869, 1870
- Josiah T. Settle – reading clerk of the House of Delegates 1872 (also Mississippi House)
- Carter A. Stewart – Ward 1 Common Council 1868 and Ward 1 Board of Aldermen 1869
- C. H. J. Taylor – Recorder of Deeds May 26, 1894 – 1896
- Robert Thompson – Ward 1 Common Council 1869, 1870
- Andrew B. Tinney – Ward 5 Common Council 1869
- James Monroe Trotter – Recorder of Deeds March 3, 1887 – February 7, 1890

== Florida ==
=== Florida Senate ===
- William Bradwell – Duval County 1868
- Henry Wilkins Chandler – Marion County 1880–1888
- Oliver J. Coleman – 10th District 1874 (also Florida House and county commissioner)
- Harry Cruse – 6th District 1869, 1870 (also Florida House)
- T. V. Gibbs – Duval County 1881
- Frederick Hill – Gadsden County 1871 (also Florida House, Florida Constitutional Convention, and postmaster)
- Joseph E. Lee – 18th District/Duval County 1881 (also Florida House and postmaster)
- Thomas Warren Long – Marion County 1873–1879
- Daniel C. Martin – Alachua County 1885, 1887
- Robert Meacham – 9th District 1868–1877, 1879 (also Florida Constitutional Convention, clerk of the circuit court, superintendent of common schools, and postmaster)
- Alfred Brown Osgood – 10th District 1875, 1876 (also Florida House)
- Charles H. Pearce – Leon County 1870–1874 (also Florida Constitutional Convention)
- Washington Pope – 3rd District 1873–1876 (also county commissioner)
- John E. Proctor – Leon County 1883 (also Florida House)
- Egbert Sammis – Duval County 1885 (also consul in Stuttgart)
- Samuel Spearing – Duval County 1874
- John Wallace – Leon County 1874–1879 (also Florida House and county constable)
- Josiah T. Walls – Alachua and Levy counties 1869–1871, 1877–1881 (also U.S. Congress, Florida House, and Florida Constitutional Convention)

=== Florida House of Representatives ===
- Edward I. Alexander – Madison County 1877, 1879, 1885 (also postmaster)
- Samuel Anderson – Duval County 1887
- Josiah Haynes Armstrong – Columbia County 1871, 1875
- Henry Black – Jefferson County
- Richard Horatio Black – Alachua County 1869, 1870
- Killis B. Bonner – Marion County 1879
- William Bradwell – Duval County 1868–1870
- Richard Lewis Brown Sr. – Duval County 1881, 1883
- James D. Bryant – Monroe County
- Wallace B. Carr – Leon County 1881, 1887 (also Florida Constitutional Convention)
- Phillip Carroll – Leon County 1881
- Joseph Newman Clinton – Alachua County 1881–1883
- George C. Coleman – Nassau County 1881
- Oliver J. Coleman – Madison County 1871, 1872, 1875 (also Florida Senate and county commissioner)
- Singleton Coleman – Marion County 1873
- Robert Cox – Leon County 1868–1870
- Harry Cruse – Gadsden County 1871–1874, 1877 (also Florida Senate)
- Peter H. Davidson Sr., Escambia County 1877
- Peter H. Davidson Jr., Escambia County 1887
- Robert H. Dennis – Jackson County 1875
- Zebulon Elijah – Escambia County 1871–1873 (also postmaster)
- Auburn H. Erwin – Columbia County 1868–1870 (also Florida Constitutional Convention)
- Lucien Fisher – Leon County 1875
- John Ford – Leon County
- Emanuel Fortune – Jackson County 1868–1870 (also Florida Constitutional Convention)
- Samuel W. Frazier – Leon County 1879, 1885, 1887 (also a justice of the peace)
- Robert Gabriel – Monroe County 1879
- Theodore Gass – Alachua County 1871–1875
- Thomas Van Renssalaer Gibbs – Duval County 1884
- Birch Gibson – Marion County 1872
- Noah Graham – Leon County 1868–1872
- Alfred Grant – Duval County 1875, 1877
- Henry Harmon – Alachua County 1868–1870
- Frederick Hill – Gadsden County 1868–1870 (also Florida Senate, Florida Constitutional Convention, and postmaster)
- David E. Jacobs – Marion County 1887
- Scipio Jasper – Marion County 1872
- Andrew Jackson Junius – Jefferson County 1879
- Isaac Jenkins – Leon County 1880–1883
- Andrew Jackson Junius – Jefferson County 1879
- Joseph E. Lee – Duval County 1875, 1877, 1879 (also Florida Senate and postmaster)
- Matthew M. Lewey – Alachua County 1883 (postmaster and mayor)
- George A. Lewis – Jacksonville County 1889
- Robert Livingston – Leon County 1868–1869
- Alfred Brown Osgood – Madison County 1868–1874,1879, 1883, 1885 (also Florida Senate)
- Samuel Petty – Nassau County 1873 (also Florida Constitutional Convention)
- Salvador T. Pons
- George Willis Proctor – Jefferson County 1883
- John E. Proctor – Leon County 1873–1875, 1879–1881 (also Florida Senate)
- I. E. Purcell – Putnam County
- Jesse Robinson – Jackson County 1868–1874
- Riley Edward Robinson – Nassau County 1883, 1885 (also postmaster)
- William K. Robinson – Jackson County 1872
- Charles Rouse – Escambia County 1874
- William U. Saunders – Gadsden County (also Florida Constitutional Convention)
- John R. Scott Sr. – Duval County 1868–1873
- John R. Scott Jr. – Duval County 1889–1891
- Charles Shavers – Monroe County 1887
- John Simpson – Marion County 1868–1870
- Samuel Small – Marion County 1874
- William G. Stewart – Leon County 1873
- John N. Stokes – Leon County 1874
- Benjamin Thompson – Jefferson County 1868–1870
- Charles H. Thompson – Columbia County 1868–1870
- William F. Thompson – Leon County 1877 (also Florida Constitutional Convention).
- Thomas Urquhart – Hamilton County and Suwannee County 1868 (also Florida Constitutional Convention)
- John Wallace – Leon County 1870, 1872 (also Florida Senate and constable)
- Josiah T. Walls – Alachua County 1868 (also U.S. Congress, Florida Senate, and Florida Constitutional Convention)
- George Washington – Alachua County 1874–1876
- Randolph W. Washington – Jefferson County 1885
- Richard H. Wells – Leon County 1868–1872 (also Florida Constitutional Convention)
- George Walter Wetmore – Duval County 1883, 1885
- Wesley Asbury Wilkinson – Marion County 1881, 1883, 1885
- George Washington Witherspoon – Jefferson County 1875
- John W. Wyatt – Leon County 1870–1874

=== Constitutional conventions ===
During the Florida Constitutional Convention of 1868, 18 of 46 elected delegates were Black. At the 1885 Constitutional Convention, seven of the 63 delegates were Black.

=== Florida Constitutional Convention of 1868 ===
- Auburn H. Erwin – Columbia and Baker counties 1868 (also Florida House)
- Emanuel Fortune – Jackson County 1868 (also Florida House)
- Jonathan Clarkson Gibbs – Duval County 1868 (also Florida Secretary of State and Florida Secretary of Public Instruction)
- Frederick Hill – Gadsden County 1868 (also Florida Senate, Florida House, and postmaster)
- Major Johnson – 1868
- Robert Meacham – Jefferson County 1868 (also Florida Senate, clerk of the circuit court, superintendent of common schools, and postmaster)
- Anthony Mills – Jefferson County 1868 (also Florida House)
- Charles H. Pearce – Leon and Wakulla counties 1868 (also Florida Senate) (Note: He was expelled from the Constitutional Convention by moderate Republicans because of his British citizenship.)
- William U. Saunders – Gadsden County 1868 (also Florida House)
- Thomas Urquhart – Hamilton County and Suwannee County 1868 (also Florida House)
- Josiah T. Walls – Alachua County 1868 (also U.S. Congress, Florida Senate, Florida House)
- Richard H. Wells – Leon and Wakulla counties, 1868 – February 20, 1868 (also Florida House)
- John W. Wyatt – Leon County 1868

=== Florida Constitutional Convention of 1885 ===
- Wallace B. Carr – Leon County 1885 (also Florida House)
- Samuel Petty – Nassau County 1885 (also Florida House)

=== Other state offices ===
- Jonathan Clarkson Gibbs – Florida Secretary of State 1868–1872 and Florida Secretary of Public Instruction (also Florida Constitutional Convention)

=== Federal offices ===
- Edward I. Alexander – postmaster of Madison County (also Florida House)
- Joseph E. Clark – postmaster of Eatonville May 25, 1889 – September 7, 1907
- Zebulon Elijah – postmaster of Pensacola January 30, 1874 – February 14, 1878 (also Florida House)
- Thomas S. Harris– postmaster of Live Oak September 17, 1898 – March 2, 1905
- Fannie A. James – postmaster of Jewell (now Lake Worth) August 22, 1889 – April 15, 1903
- Frederick Hill – postmaster of in Quincy (also Florida House, Florida Senate, Florida Constitutional Convention, and county commissioner)
- Joseph E. Lee – postmaster of (also Florida House and Florida Senate)
- Matthew M. Lewey – postmaster of Newnansville February 19, 1874 – February 8, 1875 (also Florida House and mayor)
- Robert Meacham – postmaster of Monticello February 19, 1869 – March 22, 1871 (also Florida Senate, Florida Constitutional Convention, clerk of the circuit court, and superintendent of common schools)
- Riley Edward Robinson – postmaster of Kings Ferry (also Florida House)
- Egbert Sammis – consul in Stuttgart (also Florida Senate)
- Emmanuel Smith – postmaster of Apalachicola October 13, 1881 – May 5, 1885
- William G. Stewart – postmaster of Tallahassee March 26, 1873 – July 20, 1885

=== Local offices ===
- Columbus H. Boger – mayor of Eatonville 1887
- Mitchell Chapelle – mayor of LaVilla (now part of Jacksonville)
- Oliver J. Coleman – county commissioner and Madison councilman (also Florida House and Florida Senate)
- James Dean – Monroe County judge 1889
- Charles Dupont – sheriff of Monroe County c. 1893
- Samuel W. Frazier – justice of the peace for Lean County 1872–1873 (also Florida House)
- Frederick Hill – Gadsden County commissioner (also Florida House, Florida Senate, Florida Constitutional Convention, postmaster)
- Matthew M. Lewey – mayor of Newnansville 1875–1877 (also Florida House and postmaster)
- George H. Mays – marshal of Jacksonville
- Robert Meacham – clerk of the circuit court Jefferson County 1868 and superintendent of commons schools Jefferson County 1869 (also Florida Senate, Florida Constitutional Convention, and postmaster)
- James Page – Leon County commissioner
- Washington Pope – Jackson County county commissioner 1870–1873 (also Florida Senate)
- John Wallace – constable of Leon County (also Florida House and Floridan Senate)

== Georgia ==
In Georgia, 69 African Americans served in the state legislature or as delegates to the state's constitutional convention between 1867 and 1872.

=== Georgia State Senate ===
- Aaron Alpeoria Bradley – Chatham, Bryan, and Effingham counties 1868 (also Georgia Constitutional Convention and postmaster) (Note: Expelled from office)
- Tunis Campbell Sr. – Liberty, McIntosh, and Tattnall counties 1868, 1870, 1871 (also Georgia Constitutional Convention and justice of the peace) (Note: Blocked from office by racial state legislation during 1868 and 1869. After an 1869 ruling by the U.S. Supreme Court, they were reseated in January 1870.)
- George Wallace – Hancock, Baldwin, and Washington counties 1868, 1870 (also Georgia Constitutional Convention)

=== Georgia House of Representatives ===
- Thomas M. Allen – Jasper County 1868, 1870
- Eli Barnes – Hancock County 1868, 1870
- Thomas P. Beard – Richmond County 1868, 1870
- Edwin Belcher – Wilkes County 1868 (also postmaster)
- James Blue – Glynn County 1871–1877
- Thomas M. Butler – Camden County 1878
- Tunis Campbell Jr. – McIntosh County 1868, 1870
- Malcolm Claiborne – Burke County 1868, 1870 (also Georgia Constitutional Convention)
- Abram Colby – Greene County 1866, 1868, 1870
- George H. Clower – Monroe County 1868, 1870
- John T. Costin – Talbot County 1868, 1870
- Lectured Crawford – McIntosh County 1886–1887, 1890–1891, 1900–1901
- Madison Davis – Clarke County 1868, 1871 (also postmaster)
- Monday Floyd – Morgan County 1868, 1870
- F. H. Fyall – Macon County 1868
- Samuel Gardner – Warren County 1868, 1870
- William A. Golden – Liberty County 1868, 1870
- William Guilford – Upson County 1868
- R. B. Hall – Burke County 1868, 1870
- William Henry Harrison – Hancock County 1868, 1870 (also Georgia Constitutional Convention)
- Jack Heard – Greene County 1873
- John M. Holzendorf – Camden County 1890
- Ulysses L. Houston – Bryan County 1868, 1870
- Philip Joiner – Dougherty County 1868, 1870, 1871 (also Georgia Constitutional Convention)
- J. A. Lewis – Stewart County 1871
- George Linder – Laurens County 1868, 1870 (also Georgia Constitutional Convention)
- Robert Lumpkin – Macon County 1868, 1870 (also Georgia Constitutional Convention)
- H. A. McKay – Liberty County 1900
- Romulus Moore – Columbia County 1868, 1870 (also Georgia Constitutional Convention)
- Peter O'Neal – Baldwin County 1868, 1870
- James Ward Porter – Chatham County 1868, 1870, 1871
- Alfred Richardson – Clarke County 1868, 1870
- Amos Rogers – McIntosh County 1878
- A. Simmons – Houston County 1871
- James M. Simms – Chatham County 1868, 1870
- Abraham Smith – Muscogee County 1868, 1870
- Alexander Stone – Jefferson County 1868, 1870 (also Columbia County)
- Henry McNeal Turner – Bibb County 1868, 1870, 1871 (also Georgia Constitutional Convention and postmaster)
- John Warren – Glynn County 1868, 1870
- Samuel Williams – Harris County 1868, 1870 (also Georgia Constitutional Convention)
- A. Wilson – Camden County 1884
- Hercules Wilson – McIntosh County 1882–1885

=== Georgia Constitutional Convention ===
- Simeon Beard – 18th District/Jefferson County 1867
- Aaron Alpeoria Bradley – 1st District 1867 (also Georgia Senate and postmaster)
- Tunis Campbell – 2nd District 1867 (also Georgia Senate and justice of the peace)
- Malcolm Claiborne – 17th District/Burke County 1867 (also Georgia House)
- William Henry Harrison – 20th District/Hancock County 1867 (also Georgia House)
- Philip Joiner – 10th District 1867/Dougherty County (also Georgia House)
- George Linder –16th District/Laurens County 1867 (also Georgia House)
- Robert Lumpkin – 13th District/ Macon County 1867 (also Georgia House)
- Romulus Moore – 29th District 1867/Columbia County (also Georgia House)
- Alexander Stone – 18th District/Jefferson County 1867 (also Georgia House)
- Henry McNeal Turner – 22nd District/Bibb County 1867 (also Georgia House and postmaster)
- George Wallace – 20th District 1867 (also Georgia Senate)
- Samuel Williams – 25the District/Harris County (also Georgia House)

=== Federal offices ===
- J. Curt Beall – postmaster of La Grange September 6, 1882 – August 6, 1885
- Edwin Belcher – postmaster of Macon March 22, 1873 – March 23, 1875 (also Georgia House)
- Aaron Alpeoria Bradley – postmaster of in Macon (also Georgia Constitutional Convention and Georgia Senate)
- John H. Clopton – postmaster of Hogansville March 1, 1890 –April 8, 1893
- Madison Davis – postmaster of Athens February 13, 1882 – June 2, 1890; February 15, 1886 – May 27, 1893 (Georgia House)
- Jacob D. Enos or Enis – postmaster of Valdosta May 4, 1869 – June 8, 1871
- Charles R. Jackson – postmaster of Darien October 15, 1890 – September 14, 1897; June 19, 1893 – May 18, 1909
- Isaiah H. Loftin – postmaster of Hogansville May 17, 1897 – March 2, 1900
- Monroe B. Morton – postmaster of Athens July 27, 1897 – February 6, 1902
- Luther J. Price – postmaster of South Atlanta June 18, 1889 – June 21, 1893
- Ellic L. Simon – postmaster of South Atlanta July 2, 1897 – October 31, 1904
- Henry McNeal Turner – postmaster of Macon May 18, 1869 – August 10, 1869 (also Georgia House and Georgia Constitutional Convention) (Note: Turner may not have served as postmaster according to the U.S. Postal Service.)

=== Local offices ===
- Tunis Campbell Sr. – justice of the peace (also Georgia Senate and Georgia Constitutional Convention)
- William Finch – Fourth Ward, Atlanta Board of Aldermen 1892 (now Atlanta City Council)
- George Graham – Third Ward, Atlanta Board of Aldermen 1892 (now Atlanta City Council)

== Idaho ==
=== Federal offices ===
- John B. Mitchell – postmaster of Delta October 10, 1890 – November 16, 1894

== Illinois ==
=== Illinois House of Representatives ===
- James E. Bish – Cook County 1895
- John C. Buckner – 5th District 1899–1903
- George French Ecton – 3rd District/Chicago 1888
- William L. Martin – Cook County 1898
- Edward H. Morris – Cook County 1890, 1902
- John W. E. Thomas – 3rd District/Chicago 1877–1879, 1884–1905

== Indiana ==
Indiana did not have African American legislators until after the Reconstruction era.

=== Indiana House of Representatives ===
- James S. Hinton – Marion County 1881 (also trustee of the Wabash and Erie Canal)

=== Federal offices ===
- James Cantrell – postmaster of Lyles September 12, 1898 – February 12, 1920

== Kansas ==
Kansas did not have African American legislators until after the Reconstruction era.

=== Kansas House of Representatives ===
- Alfred Fairfax – Chautauqua County 1888

=== Other state offices ===
- Edward P. McCabe – Kansas State Auditor (also county clerk, U.S. Treasury Department clerk, and county treasurer in Oklahoma)

=== Federal offices ===
- Frances Jennie Fletcher – postmaster of Nicodemus December 9, 1889 – January 5, 1894
- Zachary T. Fletcher – postmaster of Nicodemus September 12, 1877 – September 2, 1886
- Edward P. McCabe – clerk in the Cook County office of the U.S. Treasury Department (also country clerk, Kansas State Auditor, and county treasurer in Oklahoma)
- George M. Sayers – postmaster of Nicodemus April 27, 1896 – December 20, 1916

=== Local offices ===
- Edward P. McCabe – county clerk for Graham County (also Kansas State Auditor, U.S. Treasury Department clerk, and county treasurer in Oklahoma)

== Kentucky ==
=== Federal offices ===
- John D. Starks – postmaster of Brandenburg November 11, 1899 – September 16, 1890

== Louisiana ==
Through 1900, 24 African Americans served in the Louisiana Senate during Reconstruction; more than 100 served in the Louisiana House of Representatives. In addition, six African American men held statewide offices in Louisiana, including the nation's first African American acting governors.

=== Louisiana Governor ===
- Oscar James Dunn – acting governor May–July 1871 (Note: When he became Louisiana's Lieutenant Governor, Oscar James Dunn was the first African American elected to a state-level position in the United States.)
- P. B. S. Pinchback – acting governor December 1872–January 1873 (also U.S. Senate, Louisiana Lt. Governor, Louisiana Constitutional Convention, and Louisiana Senate)

=== Louisiana lieutenant governor ===
- Caesar Antoine – 1873–1877 (also Louisiana Senate and Louisiana Constitutional Convention)
- Oscar James Dunn – 1868–1871, (also Louisiana Constitutional Convention)
- P. B. S. Pinchback – 1872 (also U.S. Senate, acting Louisiana Governor, Louisiana Constitutional Convention, and Louisiana Senate)

=== Louisiana State Senate ===
- Theophile T. Allain – 14th State Senate District/Iberville Parish 1874–1880 (also Louisiana House)
- Caesar Antoine – Caddo Parish 1868–1872 (also Louisiana Lt. Governor and Louisiana Constitutional Convention)
- Alexander E. Barber – Orleans Parish 1868–1874
- Raiford Blunt – West Baton Rouge Parish 1872–1875 (also Louisiana House)
- J. Henry Burch – East Baton Rouge Parish 1872–1880 (also Louisiana House)
- Edward Butler – Plaquemines Parish, Louisiana 1870–1874
- Thomas Cage – Terrebonne Parish 1872–1884 (also Louisiana House)
- Oscar Crozier – Lafourche Parish, 1874–April 1875
- James S. Davidson – Iberville Parish 1880–1884
- Henry Demas – St. John the Baptist Parish 1874–1880, 1884–1892 (also Louisiana House)
- Emile Detiège – St. Martin Parish 1876–1878
- Andrew Dumont – Orleans Parish 1874–1878 (also Louisiana House)
- Alexander R. François – St. Martin Parish 1868–1869
- John Gair – East Feliciana Parish 1868–1876 (also Louisiana Constitutional Convention)
- Jacques Gla – Carroll and Madison parishes 1872, 1874–1880
- Robert F. Guichard – St. Bernard Parish 1884–1892 (also Louisiana House and Louisiana Constitutional Convention)
- George Hamlet – Ouachita Parish 1876–1880
- William Harper – St. Charles Parish 1872–1876
- James Henry Ingraham – Orleans Parish 1870–1874
- George Y. Kelso – Rapides Parish 1868–1876 (also Louisiana Constitutional Convention)
- Pierre Caliste Landry – Ascension Parish 1874–1878 (also Louisiana House, postmaster, and mayor)
- Jules A. Masicot – Orleans Parish 1872–1876 (also Louisiana House and Louisiana Constitutional Convention)
- Julien J. Monette – 3rd State Senate District/Orleans and St. Bernard parishes 1868
- P. B. S. Pinchback – Orleans Parish 1868–1871 (also U.S. Senate, Louisiana Lt. Governor, acting Louisiana Governor, and Louisiana Constitutional Convention)
- Robert Poindexter – Assumption, Lafourche and St. Landry parishes 1868 (also Louisiana House and Louisiana Constitutional Convention)
- Curtis Pollard – East Carroll Parish 1868–1870, 17th State Senate District 1872–1876 (also Louisiana Constitutional Convention)
- John Randall – Concordia Parish and Avoyelles Parish 1868–1869
- Fortune Riard – Orleans Parish 1874–1878 (also Louisiana Constitutional Convention)
- Richard Simms – St. James Parish 1880–1892 (also Louisiana House)
- T. B. Stamps – Jefferson Parish 1872–1880 (also Louisiana House and Louisiana Constitutional Convention)
- Jordan R. Stewart – 9th State Senate District/Terrebonne Parish 1880–1888 (also Louisiana House and Louisiana Constitutional Convention)
- Isaac Sutton – St Mary Parish 1876–1889 (also Louisiana House)
- Simon Toby – Orleans Parish 1884–1888
- Samuel Wakefield – Iberia Parish 1877–1879
- David Young – Concordia Parish 1874–1878 (also Louisiana House)

=== Louisiana House of Representatives ===
- Canon J. Adolphe – Orleans Parish 1869–1872
- Frank Alexander – New Orleans 1868
- Theophile T. Allain – Iberville Parish 1872, 1879–1888 (also Louisiana Senate)
- Arthur Antoine – St. Mary Parish 1872
- Felix C. Antoine – Orleans Parish 1870–1876
- Raiford Blunt – West Baton Rouge Parish/Natchitoches Parish 1868–1872 (also Louisiana Senate)
- Charles A. Bourgoise – St. Charles Parish 1878–1896
- R. J. Brooks – St. Mary Parish 1876–1880
- Charles F. Brown – Jefferson Parish 1880–1884
- J. Henry Burch – East Baton Rouge Parish 1879 (also Louisiana Senate)
- Thornton Butler – Orleans Parish 1876–1880
- Thomas Cage – Terrebonne Parish 1884–1888 (also Louisiana Senate)
- Henry C. W. CasaCalvo – East Baton Rouge Parish 1892–1896
- John Cayolle – St. John the Baptist Parish 1880-1888
- Royal Coleman – Terrebonne Parish 1878–1884
- Lucien Comaux – Iberville Parish 1880–1884
- Joseph Connaughton – Rapides Parish 1872–1875
- J. A. Crawford – Franklin Parish 1870–1874
- William Crawford – Union Parish 1870
- P. Darinsburg – Pointe Coupee Parish 1870
- James S. Davidson – Iberville Parish 1871–1880, 1884–1896
- Aristede Dejoie – Orleans Parish 1870–1874, 1877
- Henry Demas – St. John the Baptist Parish 1870–1874, 1879 (also Louisiana Senate)
- Vincent Dickerson – St. James Parish 1884–1892
- N. Douglass – Assumption Parish 1868–1870
- Rosario Ducoté – Avoyelles Parish 1878–1888
- Andrew Dumont – Orleans Parish 1868–1876
- Ulgar Dupart – Terrebonne Parish 1868 (also Louisiana Constitutional Convention)
- Benjamin B. Ewell – Assumption Parish 1884–1888
- John B. Esnard – St. Mary Parish 1868–70
- Victor Fauria – St. Tammany Parish 1892–1896
- T. H. Francois – Jefferson Parish 1868–1872
- John Gair – East Feliciana Parish 1868, 1872
- Bivien Gardner – Assumption Parish 1880–1884
- R. G. Gardner – Jefferson Parish 1870
- William C. Gary – St. Mary Parish 1876–1880
- Robert F. Guichard – St. Bernard Parish 1872 (also Louisiana Senate and Louisiana Constitutional Convention)
- William Harper – Caddo Parish 1870
- Governor Hawkins – Madison Parish 1884–1888
- Gloster H. Hill – Ascension Parish 1868–1870, 1874–1880
- Moses R. Hite – Assumption Parish 1879
- Robert Isabelle – Orleans Parish 1868–1876
- W. W. Johnson – Madison County 1884–1888
- H. S. Jones – Iberville Parish 1880–1884
- Milton Jones – Pointe Coupee Parish 1876
- R. M. J. Kenner – New Orleans 1870
- Pierre Caliste Landry – Ascension Parish 1872–1873, 1880–1884 (also Louisiana Senate, postmaster, mayor)
- Charles Leroy – Natchitoches Parish 1868
- Wash Lyons – Terrebonne Parish 1876–1880
- Harry Mahoney – Plaquemine Parish 1872–1884
- Joseph Mansion – Orleans Parish 1868
- Louis A. Martinet – St. Mary Parish 1872–1875
- Jules A. Masicot – Orleans Parish 1868–1872 (also Louisiana Senate and Louisiana Constitutional Convention)
- V. E. McCarthy – Orleans Parish 1868–1872
- J. Monroe – 1868, 1870, 1872
- John J. Moore – St. Mary Parish 1870
- Milton Morris – Ascension Parish 1868–1873 (also Louisiana Constitutional Convention)
- Thomas Murray – Orleans Parish 1870
- William Murrell – Lafourche Parish 1868–1878
- William Murrell Jr. – Madison Parish 1872–1876, 1878–1880 (also Louisiana Constitutional Convention)
- Anthony Overton, Sr. – Ouachita Parish 1870
- John F. Patty – St. Mary Parish 1884–1888
- Robert Poindexter – Assumption Parish 1874–April 1875 (also Louisiana Senate and Louisiana Constitutional Convention)
- Isham Pollard – Terrebonne Parish 1878
- W. S. Posey – St. Mary Parish 1884–1884
- Robert R. Ray – East Feliciana Parish 1874
- Harry Rey – Natchitoches Parish 1868
- Victor Rochon – St. Mary Parish 1872 – April 1875, 1884–1888
- Cain Sartain – East Carroll Parish 1870–1876
- Richard Simms – St. Landry Parish 1872–1874 (also Louisiana Senate)
- Charles Smith – Terrebonne Parish 1880–1884
- W. B. Smith – St. Mary Parish 1878
- Louis Snaer – Orleans Parish 1872–1876 (also Louisiana Constitutional Convention)
- T. B. Stamps – Jefferson Parish 1870 (also Louisiana Senate and Louisiana Constitutional Convention)
- Moses Sterrett, Caddo Parish 1870
- Jordan R. Stewart – Tensas Parish 1872–1876 (also Louisiana Senate and Louisiana Constitutional Convention)
- Isaac Sutton – St Mary Parish 1872–1876 (also Louisiana Senate)
- Robert J. Taylor – West Feliciana Parish 1868
- George Washington – Concordia Parish 1870–1874, 1877
- Henry George Washington – Assumption Parish 1868–1871
- Enos Williams – Terrebonne Parish 1876–1884
- Henderson Williams – Madison Parish 1868, 1870 (also Louisiana Constitutional Convention)
- W. C. Williams – East Feliciana Parish 1868, 1870
- Frederick B. Wright – Terrebonne Parish 1874–1878
- David Young – Concordia Parish 1868–1874, 1880–1884 (also Louisiana Senate)

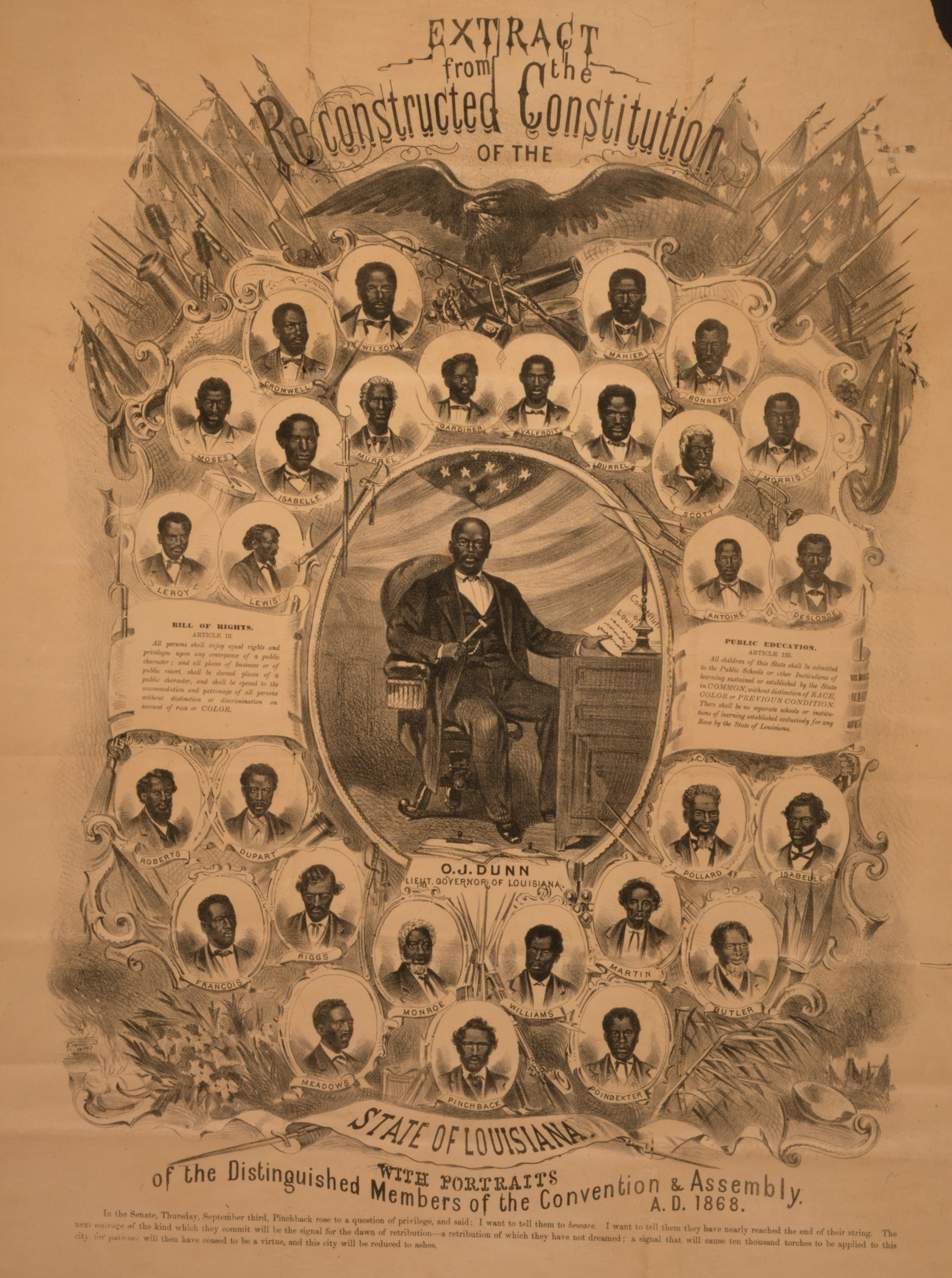
African American delegates to the Louisiana Constitutional Convention 1868

=== Louisiana Constitutional Convention ===
- Caesar Antoine – Caddo Parish 1867–1868 (also Louisiana Lt. Governor and Louisiana Senate)
- Arnold Bertonneau – 1868
- O. C. Blandin – 1867
- Emile Bonnefoi – 1867–1868
- H. Bonseigneur – 1867
- Emile Burrel – 1868
- Dennis Burrell – 1867
- William Butler – 1867–1868
- R. I. Cromwell – 1867–1868
- Pierre G. Deslonde – Iberville Parish 1867–1868 (also Louisiana Secretary of State)
- A. Donato – 1867
- Oscar Dunn – 1867 (also Lt. Governor of Louisiana)
- Gustave Dupart – 1867
- Ulgar Dupart – Terrebonne Parish 1867–1868 (also Louisiana House)
- John B. Esnard – St. Mary Parish
- Louis Francois – 1867–1868
- John Gair – 1867 (also Louisiana Senate)
- R. G. Gardiner – 1867–1868
- Leopold Guichard – 1867
- Robert F. Guichard – Saint Bernard Parish 1868 (also Louisiana Senate and Louisiana House)
- James H. Ingraham – 1867
- R. H. Isabelle – 1867–1868
- Thomas Isabelle – 1867–1868
- George Y. Kelso – Rapides Parish 1867–1868 (also Louisiana Senate)
- Victor Lange – 1868
- Charles Leroy – 1867–1868
- J. B. Lewis – 1867–1868
- Richard Lewis – 1867–1868
- Theophile Mahier – 1868
- Thomas M. Martin – 1867–1868
- Jules A. Masicot – Third District 1867–1868 (also Louisiana House and Louisiana Senate)
- William R. Meadows – 1867–1868
- ? Monroe – 1868
- Milton Morris – 1867–1868 (also Louisiana House)
- R. S. Moses – 1867–1868
- William Murrell Jr. – Madison Parish 1867–1868 (also Louisiana House)
- P. B. S. Pinchback – 1867–1868 (also U.S. Senate, Louisiana Lt. Governor, Louisiana Senate, and Louisiana acting governor)
- Robert Poindexter – Assumption Parish 1867–1868 (also Louisiana Senate and Louisiana House)
- Curtis Pollard – Franklin Parish and Madison Parish 1867–1868 (also Louisiana Senate)
- Fortune Riard – 1867 (also Louisiana Senate)
- D. D. Riggs – 1867–1868
- J.. A. H. Roberts – 1867–1868
- L. B. Rodriguez – 1867
- ? Scott – 1868
- Louis Snaer – Saint Martin Parish 1868 (also Louisiana House)
- Sosthen L. Snaer – 1867
- T. B. Stamps – Jefferson Parish 1879 (also Louisiana Senate and Louisiana House)
- Jordan R. Stewart – Terrebonne Parish 1879 (also Louisiana House and Louisiana Senate)
- C. A. Thibault – 1867
- Edouard D. Tinchant – 1867
- P. F. Valfroit – 1867–1868
- Henderson Williams – Madison Parish 1867–1868 (also Louisiana House)
- David Wilson – 1867–1868

=== Other state offices ===
- William C. Brown – Louisiana Superintendent of Education 1872–1876
- Pierre G. Deslonde – Secretary of State 1872–1876 (also Louisiana Constitutional Convention)
- Antoine Dubuclet – state treasurer 1876–1877

=== Federal offices ===
- Henry Bloch – postmaster of Opelousas March 26, 1891 – September 7, 1891
- Samuel E. Cuny or Cuney – postmaster of Colfax March 15, 1872 – April 1873
- Abraham Davis – postmaster of Franklin June 3, 1872 – March 21, 1881; January 17, 1880 – April 11, 1887
- Timothy Davis – postmaster of Pattersonville (became Patterson in 1887) May 3, 1882 – December 30, 1892
- Anna M. Dumas – postmaster of Covington November 15, 1872 – June 18, 1885
- Pierre Caliste Landry – postmaster of Donaldsonville March 3, 1871 – May 25, 1875 (also Louisiana House, Louisiana Senate, mayor)
- Charles Leroy – postmaster of Natchitoches April 29, 1869 – September 18, 1872
- Friday N. Porter Jr. – postmaster of Pearl River (became Pearlville in 1888) October 6, 1875 – May 6, 1893
- Charles W. Ringgold – postmaster of New Orleans March 1, 1873 – April 6, 1875
- James H. Stephens – postmaster of Saint Francisville April 1, 1872 – December 8, 1879
- John A. Washington – postmaster of Vidalia October 20, 1873 – May 15, 1876

=== Local offices ===
- Monroe Baker – mayor of St. Martinville 1867
- Thomas Morris Chester – superintendent of school district 1875
- Oscar Dunn – New Orleans Board of Aldermen 1867
- Pierre Caliste Landry – mayor of Donaldsonville (also Louisiana House, Louisiana Senate, and postmaster) (Note: Pierre Caliste Landry was the first elected African American mayor in the United States.)
- James Lewis – administrator of public improvements in New Orleans 1872, Orleans naval officer 1877
- Pierre Magloire – Avoyelles Parish sheriff 1872
- Alexander Noguez – Avoyelles Parish sheriff 1868–1872

== Maryland ==
=== Federal offices ===
- Nathan Johnson – postmaster of Sugarland February 6, 1896 – May 15, 1905
- Warren R. Wade – postmaster of Malcolm February 3, 1890 – September 24, 1901

=== Local offices ===
- Wiley H. Bates – Annapolis Board of Aldermen 1897–1899
- William H. Butler – Annapolis Board of Aldermen 1873–1875
- William H. Butler Jr. – Annapolis Board of Aldermen 1893–1897
- John Marcus Cargill – Baltimore City Council 1895–1897
- Harry Sythe Cummings – Baltimore City Council 1891, 1892, 1898
- Hiram Watty – Baltimore City Council 1899 and 1905

== Massachusetts ==
=== Massachusetts House of Representatives ===
- William O. Armstrong – Ward 9 1887
- Julius C. Chappelle – Boston 9th Ward/9th Suffolk District 1883–1886
- Charles E. Harris – Boston 1892 (also Boston Common Council)
- Lewis Hayden – Boston 1873
- Andrew B. Lattimore – Boston 1889 (also Boston Common Council)
- George W. Lowther – Boston 9th Ward 1878
- Charles Lewis Mitchell – 6th Suffolk District 1866
- William L. Reed – Boston 1896
- George Lewis Ruffin – 6th Suffolk District 1870 (also Boston City Council and judge)
- John J. Smith – 6th Suffolk District 1868, 1872
- Joshua Bowen Smith – Cambridge 1873
- Robert T. Teamoh – Boston 9th Ward 1894
- Edward G. Walker – Middlesex County 3rd District 1866

=== Local offices ===
- Macon Bolling Allen – Justice of the Peace for Middlesex County (also probate judge in South Carolina)
- Charles E. Harris – Boston Common Council (also Massachusetts House)
- Andrew B. Lattimore – Ward 9 Boston Common Council (also Massachusetts House)
- George Lewis Ruffin – Boston City Council 1875–1877 and judge in the Municipal Court, Charlestown District, Boston (also Massachusetts House)

== Michigan ==
=== Michigan House of Representatives ===
- Joseph H. Dickinson – Wayne County 1st district, 1897–1900
- William Webb Ferguson – Wayne County 1st district, 1893–1896

=== Other state offices ===
- Samuel C. Watson – State Board of Estimates 1875; Detroit City Council 1875, 1883–1886

== Minnesota ==
Minnesota did not have any African American legislators until after the Reconstruction era.

=== Minnesota House of Representatives ===
- John Francis Wheaton – District 42, 1899–1900

== Mississippi ==
The Mississippi Plan was part of an organized campaign of terror and violence used by the Democratic Party and Ku Klux Klan to disenfranchise African Americans in Mississippi, block them from holding office, end Reconstruction, and restore white supremacy in the state. Nevertheless, many African Americans served in its legislature, and Mississippi was the only state that elected African-American candidates to the U.S. Senate during the Reconstruction era: A total of 37 African Americans served in the state Senate and 117 served in the state House.

=== Mississippi Lieutenant Governor ===
- Alexander Kelso Davis – Lieutenant Governor 1870–1873 (also Mississippi House)

=== Mississippi Secretary of State ===
- Hannibal C. Carter – 1873, 1874 (also Mississippi House)
- James Hill – 1874–1878 (also Mississippi House)
- James D. Lynch – 1869–1872
- Murdock M. McLeod – October–November 1873 (also Mississippi House)
- Hiram Rhodes Revels – 1872–1873 (also U.S. Senate)

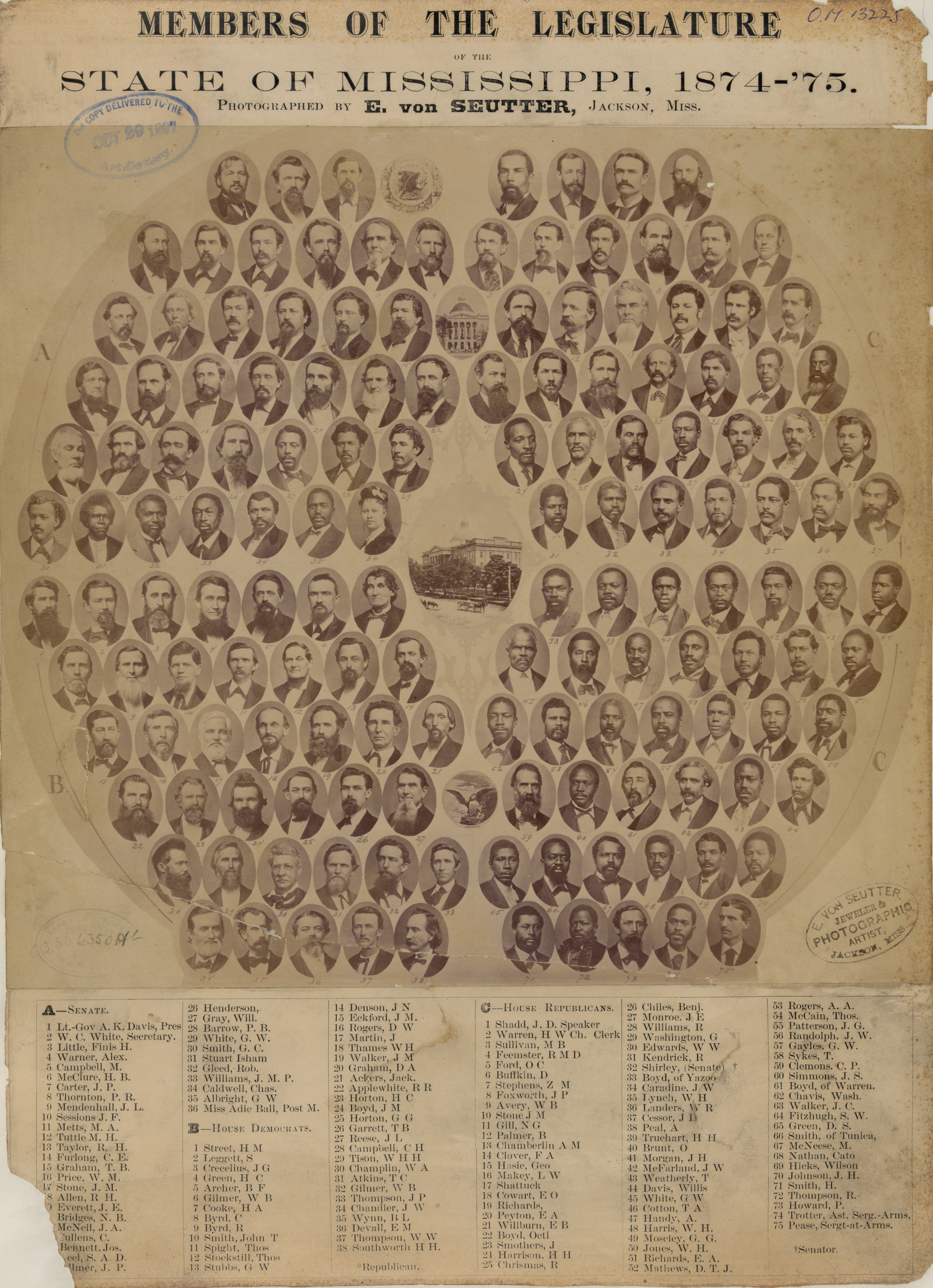
Photo composite of Mississippi state legislators in 1874 by E. von Seutter

=== Mississippi State Senate ===
- George W. Albright – Marshall County 1874–1879
- Peter Barnabas Barrow – Warren County 1872–1875 (also Mississippi House)
- Countelow M. Bowles – Bolivar County 1872–1874, 1877–1878 (also Mississippi House)
- Charles Caldwell – Hinds County 1870–1875 (also Mississippi Constitutional Convention)
- George Washington Gayles – Bolivar County 1878–1886 (also Mississippi House)
- Robert Gleed – Lowndes County 1870–1875
- William H. Gray – Washington County 1870–1875
- Nathan Shirley – Monroe and Chickasaw counties 1874–1879
- George C. Smith – Coahoma County 1874–1875
- Isham Stewart – Noxubee County 1874–1879 (also Mississippi House and Mississippi Constitutional Convention)
- Thomas W. Stringer – Warren County 1870–1871
- George W. White – Wilkinson County 1874–1875 (also Mississippi House)
- Jeremiah M. P. Williams – Adams County 1870–1874, 1878–1880

=== Mississippi House of Representatives ===
- William H. Allen – Coahoma County 1884–1887
- L. K. Altwood – Hinds County 1880, 1884
- Peter Barnabas Barrow – Warren County 1870–1871 (also Mississippi Senate)
- Monroe Bell – Hinds County 1872
- Stephen Blackwell – Issaquena County 1882–1889
- Jesse Freeman Boulden – Lowndes County 1870
- Countelow M. Bowles – Bolivar County 1870 (also Mississippi Senate)
- George F. Bowles – Adams County 1881–1894
- Anderson Boyd – Oktibbeha County 1874
- George W. Boyd – Warren County 1874
- Walter Boyd – Yazoo County 1874
- Arthur Brooks – Monroe County 1872
- Frank P. Brooks – Sharkey County 1866
- George P. A. Brown – Tunica County 1875
- Orange Brunt – Panola County 1874
- Joseph Henry Bufford – Bolivar County 1880
- Charles W. Bush – Warren County 1872
- George William Butler – Sharkey County 1884–1894
- J. Wesley Caradine – Clay County 1874
- Hannibal C. Carter – Warren County 1872, 1876 (also Mississippi Secretary of State)
- James Cessor – Jefferson County 1872–1877
- George Charles – Lawrence County 1870
- George Washington Chavis – Warren County 1874
- Benjamin Chiles – Oktibbeha County 1874–1878
- Richard Christmas – Copiah County 1874
- Charles P. Clemens – Clarke County 1874
- Milton Coates – Warren County 1882–1885
- John Cocke – Panola County 1872
- Felix L. Cory – Adams County 1884–1886
- Thomas A. Cotton – Noxubee County 1874
- Henry Craytin – Yazoo County 1880
- Robert Cunningham – Marshall County 1878
- Alexander Kelso Davis – Noxubee County 1870–1873 (also Lieutenant Governor)
- Willis Davis – Noxubee County 1874–1876
- James M. Dickson – Yazoo County 1872
- George Edwards – Madison County 1878
- Weldon W. Edwards – Warren County 1874–1877, 1882
- Alfred Fields – Panola County 1880
- Samuel Fitzhugh – Wilkinson County 1874–1876
- Hugh M. Foley – Wilkinson County 1870, 1873
- William Henderson Foote – Yazoo County 1870
- George Washington Gayles – Bolivar County 1872–1875 (also Mississippi Senate)
- J. H. Glenn – Lowndes County 1874
- George Caldwell Granberry – Hinds County 1882
- David S. Green – Grenada County 1872–1875
- Richard Griggs – Issaquena County 1870, 1872 (also Commissioner of Agriculture & Immigration)
- Alfred Newton Handy – Madison County 1870–1875
- Emanuel Handy – Copiah County 1870–1873
- John F. Harris – Washington County 1890
- W. H. Harris – Washington County 1874, 1888
- Henry H. Harrison – Chickasaw County 1874
- Charles P. Head – Warren County 1870
- William W. Hence – Adams County 1880
- Ambrose Henderson – Chickasaw County 1870
- John Franklin Henry – Madison County 1884
- Weldon Hicks – Hinds County 1874, 1878
- Wilson Hicks – Rankin County 1874
- David Higgins – Oktibbeha County 1870
- James Hill – Marshall County 1872 (also Secretary of State of Mississippi)
- William Holmes – Monroe County 1870–1873
- D. H. Hopson – Coahoma County 1888
- Gilbert Horton – Washington County 1884
- Russell Walker Houston – Issaquena County 1872
- Merrimon Howard – Jefferson County 1870 (also sheriff)
- Perry Howard – Holmes County 1872–1875
- George W. Huntley – Bolivar County 1888
- Henry L. Jackson – Rankin County 1888
- Henry P. Jacobs – Adams County 1870, 1872
- David Jenkins – Madison County 1876
- Albert Johnson – Warren County 1870–1876
- J. H. Johnson – DeSoto County 1872–1875
- John Johnson – Madison County 1886–1887
- William Johnson – Hinds County 1872
- Cornelius J. Jones – Issaquena County 1890
- William H. Jones – Issaquena County 1874–1877
- Reuben Kendrick – Amite County 1872–1875
- William Landers – Jefferson County 1872–1876
- Matthew Levy – Madison County 1882
- Samuel W. Lewis – Madison County 1884
- William Lucius Lowe – Bolivar County 1886
- John R. Lynch – Adams County 1872, 1874; Speaker of the House 1872–1873 (also U.S. Congress)
- William H. Lynch – Adams County 1874–1877, 1882–1889
- William H. Mallory – Warren County 1872, LeFlore County and Sunflower County 1875
- James G. Marshall – Holmes County 1878
- Daniel T. J. Mathews – Panola County 1874
- Henry Mayson – Hinds County 1870 (also Mississippi Constitutional Convention)
- Thomas McCain – DeSoto County 1872–1875
- J. W. McFarland – Rankin County 1874
- Murdock M. McLeod – Hinds County 1884 (also Mississippi of Secretary State)
- Marshall McNeese – Noxubee County 1870, 1874–1877
- Cicero Mitchell – Holmes County 1870, 1878
- Peter Mitchell – Washington County 1882, 1886
- Joseph E. Monroe – Coahoma County 1874–1877
- James Aaron Moore – Lauderdale County 1870 (also Mississippi Constitutional Convention)
- L. C. Moore – Bolivar County 1890
- Lemuel C. Moore – Issaquena County 1880, 1884
- John H. Morgan – Washington County 1870–1875
- George G. Moseley – Hinds County 1874
- Cato Nathan – Monroe County 1874
- Randle Nettles – Oktibbeha County 1870–1873
- Matthew T. Newsom – Claiborne County 1870 (also Mississippi Constitutional Convention)
- C. F. Norris – Hinds County 1870
- George H. Oliver – Coahoma County 1890
- Lawrence W. Overton – Noxubee County 1876
- Jones R. Parker – Washington County 1884
- James G. Patterson – Yazoo County 1874
- Alfred Peal – Marshall County 1874
- Perry Peyton – Bolivar County 1884
- James H. Piles – Panola County 1870–1875 (also Assistant Secretary of State)
- Albert B. Poston – Panola County 1882
- J. W. Randolph – Sunflower County and Leflore County 1874
- Charles Reese – Hinds County 1872
- Elzy Richards – Lowndes County 1872–1875
- Samuel Riley – Wilkinson County 1876
- William M. Robinson – Hinds County 1884
- A. A. Rogers – Marshall County 1874
- Jacob Allen Ross – Washington County 1871
- Samuel A. Sanderlin – Washington and Issaquena counties 1876
- Edmund Scarborough – Holmes County, Mississippi 1870
- Henry P. Scott – Issaquena County 1878
- Gray Selby – Marshall County 1880
- Josiah T. Settle – Panola County 1883
- Isaac Shadd – Warren County 1872–1876, Speaker of the House 1874–1875
- James A. Shorter Jr. – Hinds County 1882
- James S. Simmons – Issaquena County and Washington County 1874, 1883
- Adam D. Simpson – Madison County 1877
- Gilbert C. Smith – Tunica County 1872–1875, 1884
- Haskin Smith – Claiborne County 1872–1876
- Joseph Smothers – Claiborne County 1872–1875
- James J. Spelman – Madison County 1869–1875 (also a justice of the peace)
- Frederick Stewart – Holmes County 1872
- Isham Stewart – Noxubee County 1870–1873 (also Mississippi Senate and Mississippi Constitutional Convention)
- Doctor Stites – Washington County 1870
- Thomas Sykes – Panola County 1872
- Robert Thompson – Lowndes County 1874
- Harrison Truhart – Holmes County 1872–1875
- Guilford Vaughan – Panola County 1876
- F. Dora Wade – Yazoo County 1872
- Jefferson Cobb Walker – Monroe County 1874
- George Washington – Carroll County 1874
- George R. Washington – Adams County 1878
- Tenant Weatherly – Holmes County 1874, 1880
- John D. Webster – Washington County 1872
- Eugene Welborne – Hinds County 1874
- George White – Chickasaw County 1874
- George W. White – Wilkinson County 1870–1873 (also Mississippi Senate)
- Ralph Williams – Marshall County 1873–1875
- Michael Wilson – Marion County 1870
- Charles A. Yancy – Panola County 1870 (died before being seated)
- James B. Young – Washington County 1877
- James M. Young – Panola County 1878

=== Mississippi Constitutional Convention ===
- Charles Caldwell – Hinds County 1868 (also Mississippi Senate)
- Amos Drane – Madison County 1868
- Henry Mayson – Hinds County 1868 (also Mississippi House)
- Isaiah Montgomery – Bolivar County 1890 (also mayor and postmaster)
- James Aaron Moore – Lauderdale County (also Mississippi House)
- Matthew T. Newsom – Claiborne County 1868 (also Mississippi House)
- Isham Stewart – Noxubee County 1868 (also Mississippi House and Mississippi Senate)

=== Other state offices ===
- Thomas Cardozo – Mississippi Superintendent of Education
- Hannibal C. Carter – Mississippi Secretary of State September 1, 1873 – October 20, 1873; November 13, 1873 – January 4, 1874 (also Mississippi House)
- Richard Griggs – Mississippi Commissioner of Agriculture & Immigration 1873–1876 (also Mississippi House)
- James Hill – Mississippi Secretary of State January 1874–January 1878 (also Mississippi House)
- James D. Lynch – Mississippi Secretary of State 1868–1872
- James H. Piles – Assistant Secretary of State of Mississippi 1875 (also Mississippi House)
- Hiram Rhodes Revels – Mississippi Secretary of State 1872–1873 (and U.S. Senate)

=== Federal offices ===
- Daniel W. Ambrose – postmaster of Pickens January 19, 1898 – May 11, 1898
- Henry Blackman – postmaster of Brookhaven May 13, 1873 – November 13, 1876
- Benjamin G. Boothe – postmaster of Water Valley July 5, 1884 – December 5, 1885
- Franklin P. Brinson – postmaster of Duncansby September 20, 1897 – May 25, 1905
- Jenkins Cook – postmaster of Dry Grove February 1, 1898 – April 16, 1902
- Minnie M. Cox – postmaster of Indianola January 16, 1891 – May 22, 1897; April 17, 1893 – February 2, 1904
- Robert W. Fitzhugh – postmaster of Natchez January 19, 1876 – October 10, 1883
- Joseph Graves – postmaster of Pearlington March 7, 1883 – April 16, 1889; August 20, 1885 – May 9, 1894
- Edward Hill – postmaster of Raymond June 6, 1870 – May 26, 1874
- James Hill – postmaster of Vicksburg April 2, 1891 – April 15, 1893
- A. D. Jones – postmaster of Corinth February 25, 1871 – March 6, 1874
- Thomas I. Keys – postmaster of Ocean Springs August 4, 1897 – March 3, 1911
- Elias W. Matthews – postmaster of Batesville April 25, 1882 – March 7, 1883
- William McCary – postmaster of Natchez October 10, 1883 – August 6, 1885
- Benjamin F. Mitchell – postmaster of Greenwood July 23, 1873 – October 27, 1875
- Isaiah T. Montgomery – postmaster of Mound Bayou June 12, 1888 – March 14, 1894
- Joshua P. T. Montgomery – postmaster of Mound Bayou March 14, 1894 – May 2, 1895
- Mary V. Montgomery – postmaster of Mound Bayou May 2, 1895 – September 27, 1902
- William Thornton Montgomery – postmaster of Hurricane May 6, 1867 – September 14, 1880
- Ellis E. Perkins – postmaster of Edwards May 12, 1898 – February 15, 1910
- Louis J. Piernas – postmaster of Bay St. Louis April 18, 1889 – May 27, 1898; May 5, 1894 – March 3, 1911
- Thomas Richardson – postmaster of Port Gibson September 28, 1870 – October 6, 1876; February 27, 1890 – February 26, 1875; May 11, 1885 – March 14, 1894
- Robert Steward – postmaster of Macon March 11, 1875 – May 16, 1881
- Henry K. Thomas – postmaster of Bovina June 1, 1877 –December 5, 1882
- Robert H. Wood – postmaster of Natchez March 17, 1873 – April 16, 1876 (also mayor)

=== Local offices ===
- Merrimon Howard – sheriff in Jefferson County (also Mississippi House)
- Isaiah Montgomery – mayor of Mound Bayou (also Mississippi Constitutional Convention and postmaster)
- James J. Spelman – justice of the peace and alderman of Canton (also Mississippi House)
- Robert H. Wood – mayor Natchez 1870–1871; Adams County Board of Supervisors 1871–1872 (also postmaster)

== Missouri ==
=== Federal positions ===
- James Milton Turner – consul general to Liberia March 1, 1871 – May 7, 1877

== Nebraska ==
=== Nebraska House of Representatives ===
- Matthew Oliver Ricketts – 1893–1897

== New York ==
=== Local offices ===
- James Campbell Matthews – Judge of Albany's Recorder's Court 1895–1899
- Edward "Ned" Sherman – mayor of Cleveland 1878

== North Carolina ==
=== North Carolina Senate ===
- Isaac Alston – 19th District/Warren County 1879, 1881
- John R. Bryant – 5th District/Halifax County 1866, 1874, 1876 (also North Carolina House)
- Wilson Carey – Caswell County 1870 (also North Carolina House)
- Hawkins W. Carter – Warren County 1881, 1883
- Franklin D. Dancy – Edgecombe County 1879–1880
- Henry Eppes – 7th District/Halifax County 1868–1874, 1879, 1887 (also N.C. Constitutional Convention)
- Thomas O. Fuller – Warren County 1899–1900
- Abraham Galloway – 13th District/New Hanover County 1868 (N.C. Constitutional Convention)
- Robert Gray – 5th District/Edgecombe County 1833 (also North Caroline House)
- James Harris – 18th District/Wake County 1872 (also North Carolina House and N.C. Constitutional Convention)
- William B. Henderson – Vance County 1897–1898
- Hanson T. Hughes – 21st District/Granville County 1866, 1876 (also North Carolina House)
- John Adams Hyman – 20th District/Warren County 1868–1871, 19th District/Warren County 1872 (also U.S. Congress and N.C. Constitutional Convention)
- George Lawrence Mabson – 5th District/Edgecombe County 1866, 1872–1877 (also North Carolina House and N.C. Constitutional Convention)
- George Mebane – Bertie and Northampton counties 1866, 1876, 1883
- Jacob H. Montgomery – (also North Carolina House)
- William H. Moore – 12th District/New Hanover County 1876 (also North Carolina House)
- John M. Paschall – 19th District/Warren County 1874
- George W. Price Jr. – 13th District/New Hanover County 1870 (also North Carolina House)
- R. S. Taylor – 5th District/Edgecombe County 1885, 1887
- Richard Tucker – 8th District/Craven County 1874
- George L. Mabson – New Hanover County 1872–1874
- George Henry White – 8th District/Craven County 1885 (also North Carolina House and U.S. Congress)

=== North Carolina House of Representatives ===
- Israel Abbott – Craven County 1872
- Isaac Alston – Warren County 1879, 1890
- Wiley Baker – Northampton County 1883
- B. W. Battle – Edgecombe County 1879
- William Belcher – Edgecombe County 1883
- Henry Brewington – New Hanover County 1874
- Aaron R. Bridgers – Edgecombe County 1883
- John R. Bryant – Halifax County 1870, 1872 (also North Carolina Senate)
- Willis Bunn – Edgecombe County 1870–1877
- Wilson Carey – Craven County 1868, 1874, 1876, 1879, 1889 (also North Carolina Senate)
- Hawkins W. Carter – Warren County 1879
- William Cawthorne – Warren County 1870
- Henry C. Cherry – Edgecombe County 1868 (also N.C. Constitutional Convention)
- L. T. Christmas – Warren County 1879
- Hugh Cole – Pasquotank County 1879
- J. A. Crawford – Granville County 1868, 1870
- C. W. Crews – Granville County 1874, 1876
- H. W. Crews – Person County 1893
- Edward R. Dudley – Craven County 1870, 1872
- Harry B. Eaton – Warren and Vance counties 1883, 1885
- James Youman Eaton – Vance County 1899
- Richard Elliott – Chowan County 1874
- Stewart Ellison – Wake County 1870, 1872, 1879
- Richard Faulkner – Warren County 1868, 1870
- Robert Fletcher – Richmond County 1870–1874
- John R. Good – Craven County 1874
- John S. W. Eagles – New Hanover County 1869–70
- Eustace Edward Green – New Hanover County 1882
- Robert Gray – Edgecombe County 1883 (also North Carolina Senate)
- James Harris – Wake County 1868, 1883, 1895, 1897 (also North Carolina Senate and N.C. Constitutional Convention)
- H. T. J. Hayes – Halifax County 1868 (also N.C. Constitutional Convention)
- Hilliard J. Hewlin – 1883
- Alexander Hicks – Washington County 1881
- Edward H. Hill – Craven County 1874
- J. C. Hill – New Hanover County 1876
- Valentine Howell – New Hanover County 1887
- George W. Howell – Caswell County 1874
- Hanson T. Hughes – Granville County 1866, 1872, 1874 (also North Carolina Senate)
- John E. Hussey – Craven County 1885, 1887, 1889
- Ivey Hutchings – Halifax County 1868
- R. M. Johnson – Edgecombe County 1870
- William H. Johnson – 1883
- J. A. Jones – Halifax County 1874
- George H. King – Warren County 1872
- John Sinclair Leary – Cumberland County 1868, 1870
- Bryant Lee – Bertie County 1868
- Alfred Lloyd – New Hanover County 1872, 1874; Pender County 1876
- George Lawrence Mabson – New Hanover County 1870 (also North Carolina Senate)
- Cuffee Mayo – Granville County 1868
- William McLaurin – New Hanover County 1872
- William P. Mabson – Edgecombe County 1872 (also North Carolina Senate and N.C. Constitutional Convention)
- George Mebane – New Hanover County 1868
- Jacob H. Montgomery – Warren County 1883 (also North Carolina Senate)
- William H. Moore – New Hanover County 1874 (also North Carolina Senate)
- Wilson W. Morgan or Willis Morgan – Wake County 1870
- B. T. Morris or B. W. Morris – Craven County 1868
- Noah R. Newby – 1883
- John J. Newell – Bladen County 1874, 1879, 1881
- W. D. Newsome – Hertford County 1870
- James E. O'Hara – Halifax County 1868 (also U.S. Congress and N.C. Constitutional Convention)
- John R. Page – Chowan County 1870
- John W. H. Paschall – Warren County 1872 (also North Carolina Senate)
- Moses M. Peace – Vance County 1895, 1897
- Willis D. Pettipher or Pettiford – Craven County 1879
- James M. Pittman – 1883
- James W. Poe – Caswell County 1883
- George W. Price Jr. – New Hanover County 1868, 1870 (also North Carolina Senate)
- W. H. Reavis – Granville County 1870
- John T. Reynolds – Halifax County 1879
- Augustus Robbins – Bertie County 1879, 1881
- Parker David Robbins – Bertie County 1868, 1870 (also North Carolina Constitutional Convention and postmaster)
- Limas Roulhac – Bertie County 1885
- Isaac H. Smith – Craven County 1899
- Turner R. Speller – Bertie County 1883, 1887, 1889
- A. W. Stevens – Craven County 1868
- Isham Sweat – Cumberland County 1868
- Edward H. Sutton – Chowan County 1883
- Thomas A. Sykes – Pasquotank County 1868–1872 (also Tennessee House)
- Bryant W. Thorpe – Edgecombe County 1885
- Richard Tucker – Craven County 1870
- William Henry Waddell – New Hanover County 1879, 1883
- James M. Watson – Vance County 1887, 1893
- George Henry White – Craven County 1879, 1881 (also North Carolina Senate and U.S. Congress)
- John A. White – Halifax County 1874, 1876, 1879, 1887
- John H. Williamson – Franklin County 1866–1888 (also North Carolina Constitutional Convention)
- George B. Willis – Craven County 1870
- Dred Wibmerley – Sampson County 1879
- James H. Young – Wake County 1895, 1897

=== North Carolina Constitutional Convention ===
- Wilson Carey – Caswell County 1868, 1875
- Henry C. Cherry – Edgecombe County 1868 (also North Carolina House)
- John O. Crosby – Warren County 1874
- Henry Eppes – Halifax County 1868 (also North Carolina House)
- A. H. Galloway – New Hanover County 1868 (also North Carolina Senate)
- James Harris – Wake County 1868 (also North Carolina House and North Carolina Senate)
- W. T. J. Hayes – Halifax County 1868 (also North Carolina House)
- Samuel Highsmith – Duplin County 1868
- John Adams Hyman – Warren County 1868 (also U.S. Congress and North Carolina Senate)
- Bryant Lee – Bertie County 1868
- William P. Mabson – Edgecombe County 1875 (also North Carolina House and North Carolina Senate)
- James E. O'Hara – Halifax County 1875 (also U.S. Congress and North Carolina House)
- J. W. Petterson – Duplin County 1868
- Clinton D. Pierson – Craven County 1868
- Parker David Robbins – Bertie County 1868 (also North Carolina House and postmaster)
- J. H. Smythe – New Hanover County 1875
- John H. Williamson – Franklin County 1868 (also North Carolina House)

=== Federal offices ===
- Albert L. Alston – postmaster of Macon December 11, 1891 – April 29, 1893
- Collin P. Anthony – postmaster of Scotland Neck September 17, 1897 – July 11, 1898
- Weeks S. Armstrong – postmaster of Rocky Mount April 18, 1889 – March 31, 1890
- Daniel W. Baker – postmaster of Lewiston June 10, 1897 – April 1, 1899
- Mary A. Baker – postmaster of Dudley November 11 26, 1897 – August 22, 1911
- William Baker – postmaster of South Gaston October 24, 1889 – October 7, 1897; October 13, 1893 – March 31, 1904
- William B. Baker – postmaster of Dudley August 27, 1883 – September 3, 1884
- Clinton Wesley Battle – postmaster of Battleboro November 11, 1897 – November 22, 1899
- William E. Bennett – postmaster of Powellsville January 13, 1898 – February 23, 1901
- Lewis T. Bond – postmaster of Windsor May 3, 1897 – July 12, 1901
- Albert C. Booth – postmaster of Harrellsville November 15, 1897 – September 26, 1900
- Moses J. Bullock – postmaster of Townsville February 19, 1874 – February 8, 1886
- Thomas H. Burwell – postmaster of Kittrell October 24, 1889 – September 4, 1893
- Joseph B. Catus – postmaster of Winton September 24, 1897 – June 6, 1913
- Edward Cheek – postmaster of Halifax April 9, 1897 – March 7, 1901
- James D. Cherry – postmaster of Drew July 7, 1897 – May 20, 1901
- Edward D. Clark – postmaster of Kelford December 20, 1897 – June 19, 1901
- William C. Coats – postmaster of Seaboard November 9, 1889 – November 3, 1893
- Mrs. Willie F. Coats – postmaster of Seaboard October 26, 1897 – October 26, 1901
- Hezekiah Cook – postmaster of Oberlin April 11, 1892 – May 8, 1894
- Charner H. Davis – postmaster of Townesville (became Townsville 1892) July 20, 1889 – December 10, 1897; September 9, 1893 – January 15, 1909
- Cora E. Davis – postmaster of Halifax April 5, 1889 – December 8, 1890
- Frank Davis – postmaster of Southport February 1, 1892 – May 16, 1893
- Ada Dickens – postmaster of Lawrence August 9, 1897 – November 22, 1899
- Henry H. Falkener – postmaster of Macon May 21, 1890 – December 11, 1891
- Alonzo Green – postmaster of Gatesville May 2, 1870 – April 2, 1878
- Mary Guion – postmaster of Tarheel June 5, 1897 – July 29, 1898
- John H. Hannon – postmaster of Halifax December 8, 1890 – April 10, 1893
- Israel D. Hargett – postmaster of Rocky Mount July 27, 1897 – February 15, 1899
- Cicero B. Harris – postmaster of Panacea Springs (became Panacea in 1894) July 12, 1889 – December 14, 1897; October 23, 1893 – October 2, 1902
- Edmond D. Hart – postmaster of Princeville March 17, 1898 – May 25, 1909
- Benjamin H. Henderson – postmaster of Fayetteville January 21, 1892 – March 3, 1896
- Hilliard J. Hewlin – postmaster of Brinkleyville October 5, 1897 – October 5, 1901
- John H. Howard – postmaster of Weldon January 18, 1898 – June 27, 1902
- Robert S. Jervay – postmaster of Elbow May 12, 1898 – April 15, 1910
- William H. Jones – postmaster of Morehead City February 25, 1890 – June 16, 1893
- Norman L. Keen – postmaster of Essex April 29, 1891 – August 4, 1897; August 16, 1893 – August 6, 1901
- Brosier W. Langford – postmaster of Potecasi July 21, 1897 – January 17, 1898
- George W. Lane – postmaster of Edenton August 1, 1881 – February 24, 1885
- Charles H. Lewter – postmaster of Lewiston April 1, 1899 – November 18, 1901
- Henry D. Mayo – postmaster of Littleton May 26, 1897 – April 13, 1901
- Martha E. Middleton – postmaster of Kenansville August 25, 1892 – May 8, 1893
- Elenora J. Newsome – postmaster of Margarettsville July 2, 1897 – December 21, 1900
- Berry O'Kelly – postmaster of Method October 9, 1890 – April 1, 1931
- William H. Outlaw – postmaster of Windsor April 30, 1891 – April 1, 1893
- W. Lee Person – postmaster of Rocky Mount April 11, 1890 – June 13, 1893
- James M. Pittman – postmaster of Tillery January 23, 1890 – April 9, 1897; July 11, 1893 – October 28, 1898
- George W. Reynolds – postmaster of Murfreesboro October 31, 1889 – April 13, 1892
- Edward A. Richardson – postmaster of New Bern July 18, 1884 – June 11, 1885
- Augustus Robbins – postmaster of Windsor June 14, 1889 – April 30, 1891
- Parker David Robbins – postmaster of Harrellsville September 22, 1875 – October 8, 1877 (also North Carolina Constitutional Convention and North Carolina House)
- Emma S. Roberts – postmaster of Jackson August 6, 1897 – August 7, 1901
- Winfrey H. Roberts – postmaster of Rich Square September 11, 1889 – November 9, 1897; September 19, 1893 – November 9, 1901
- Freeman J. Ryan – postmaster of Quitsna June 24, 1897 – December 15, 1900
- Thomas Shields – postmaster of Scotland Neck July 11, 1898 – May 14, 1901
- Allen A. Smith – postmaster of Mount Olive May 27, 1897 – July 20, 1901
- Henry L. Solomon – postmaster of Ita May 11, 1899 – July 25, 1901
- Washington Spivey – postmaster of James City January 11, 1888 – May 1, 1908
- John H. Thorpe – postmaster of Kittrell January 14, 1898 – March 28, 1902
- Samuel H. Vick – postmaster of Wilson September 28, 1889 – May 24, 1898; February 16, 1894 – March 24, 1903
- Henry L. Watson – postmaster of Macon November 10, 1897 – November 9, 1901
- York Whitehead – postmaster of Aurelian Springs January 19, 1898 – January 20, 1902
- Henry W. Williams – postmaster of Tillery April 8, 1889 – January 23, 1890
- Washington Winn – postmaster of Mount Olive May 31, 1881 – August 6, 1885
- James S. Wortham – postmaster of Ridgeway April 14, 1897 – July 2, 1901
- Winfield F. Young – postmaster of Littleton July 15, 1875 – July 26, 1889; August 3, 1885 – 23, 1893

== Ohio ==
=== Ohio Senate ===
- John Patterson Green – Cleveland and Cuyahoga County 1892 (also Ohio House and justice of the peace)

=== Ohio House of Representatives ===
- Benjamin W. Arnett – Greene County 1886
- Jeremiah A. Brown – Cuyahoga County 1886
- William H. Clifford – Cuyahoga County 1894, 1898
- William H. Copeland – Hamilton County 1888
- John Patterson Green – Cuyahoga County 1882, 1890 (also Ohio Senate and justice of the peace)
- Robert Harlan – Hamilton County 1886
- Samuel B. Hill – Hamilton County 1894
- George H. Jackson – Hamilton County 1892
- William H. Parham – Hamilton County 1896
- Harry Clay Smith – Cuyahoga County 1894–1897, 1900–1901
- William R. Stewart – Mahoning County 1896
- George W. Williams – Hamilton County 1879

=== Federal offices ===
- George W. Harding – postmaster of Wilberforce August 21, 1893 – July 24, 1897

=== Local offices ===
- John Patterson Green – justice of the peace for Cuyahoga County 1873 (also Ohio House and Ohio Senate)

== Oklahoma ==
=== Federal offices ===
- William Anderson – postmaster of Udora October 7, 1897 – September 30, 1911 (Note: All-African American towns that existed in the Indian Territory in the 19th and early 20th centuries, but no longer exist today, include Lee, Lincoln, Udora, and Wellington. For more information, refer to "All-Black Towns" in The Encyclopedia of Oklahoma History and Culture.)
- John G. Crump – postmaster of Zion July 20, 1891 – June 22, 1895
- Samuel G. Garrett – postmaster of Langston June 25, 1891 – February 17, 1894
- William C. Garrett – postmaster of Ridge, Indian Territory December 29, 1884 – March 12, 1886; postmaster of Wellington, Indian Territory July 24, 1890 – November 9, 1891
- Maston Harris – postmaster of Udora November 18, 1895 – October 7, 1897
- Jerry I. Hazelwood – postmaster of Langston April 14, 1898 – September 12, 1914
- David A. Lee – postmaster of Wellington, Indian Territory (became Lee, Indian Territory in 1892) November 9, 1891 – February 15, 1895
- William Martin – postmaster of Wanamaker January 18, 1898 – April 15, 1903
- Abner L. J. Meriwether – postmaster of Lee, Indian Territory August 8, 1898 – November 12, 1902
- Clara M. Overton – postmaster of Wanamaker March 3, 1890 – December 28, 1894
- James A. Roper – postmaster of Okmulgee February 3, 1898 – March 10, 1902
- Charles W. Stevenson – postmaster of Wanamaker December 28, 1894 – April 15, 1903; January 18, 1898 – July 8, 1908
- Lee B. Tatum – postmaster of Tatums May 9, 1896 – September 5, 1911
- Thomas H. Traylor – postmaster of Douglas May 12, 1894 – May 23, 1895
- Stanley Ward – postmaster of Udora February 20, 1895 – November 18, 1895
- Lewis E. Willis – postmaster of Tullahassee January 26, 1899 – October 25, 1905
- John J. Young – postmaster of Lincoln December 14, 1889 – September 22, 1894

=== Local offices ===
- Edward P. McCabe – treasurer of Logan County (also Kansas State Auditor, U.S. Treasury Department clerk in Kansas, and county clerk in Kansas)

== Pennsylvania ==
=== Federal offices ===
- James H. Lyons – postmaster of Salemville July 7, 1882 – July 26, 1893
- Nathan T. Velar – postmaster of Brinton, Pittsburgh April 29, 1897 – November 26, 1907

=== Local offices ===
- William H. Day – school board of directors at Harrisburg 1879, 1881, 1887

== Rhode Island ==
=== Rhode Island General Assembly ===
- Mahlon Van Horne – Newport, Rhode Island, 1885, 1887, 1889

== South Carolina ==
During Reconstruction, South Carolina was the only state whose legislature was majority African American. Eric Foner says 29 African Americans served in the South Carolina Senate, and 210 African Americans served in the South Carolina House of Representatives. In addition, 72 African Americans participated in the 1868 South Carolina Constitutional Convention. Many others served in various state or local offices, ranging from lieutenant governor to justice of the peace.

=== South Carolina Lt. Governor ===
- Richard Howell Gleaves – December 7, 1872 – December 14, 1876 (Note: Gleaves was elected to a third term as Lt. Governor in 1876, but the Democrats forced him to withdraw.)
- Alonzo J. Ransier – December 3, 1870 – December 7, 1872 (also U.S. Congress and South Carolina House)

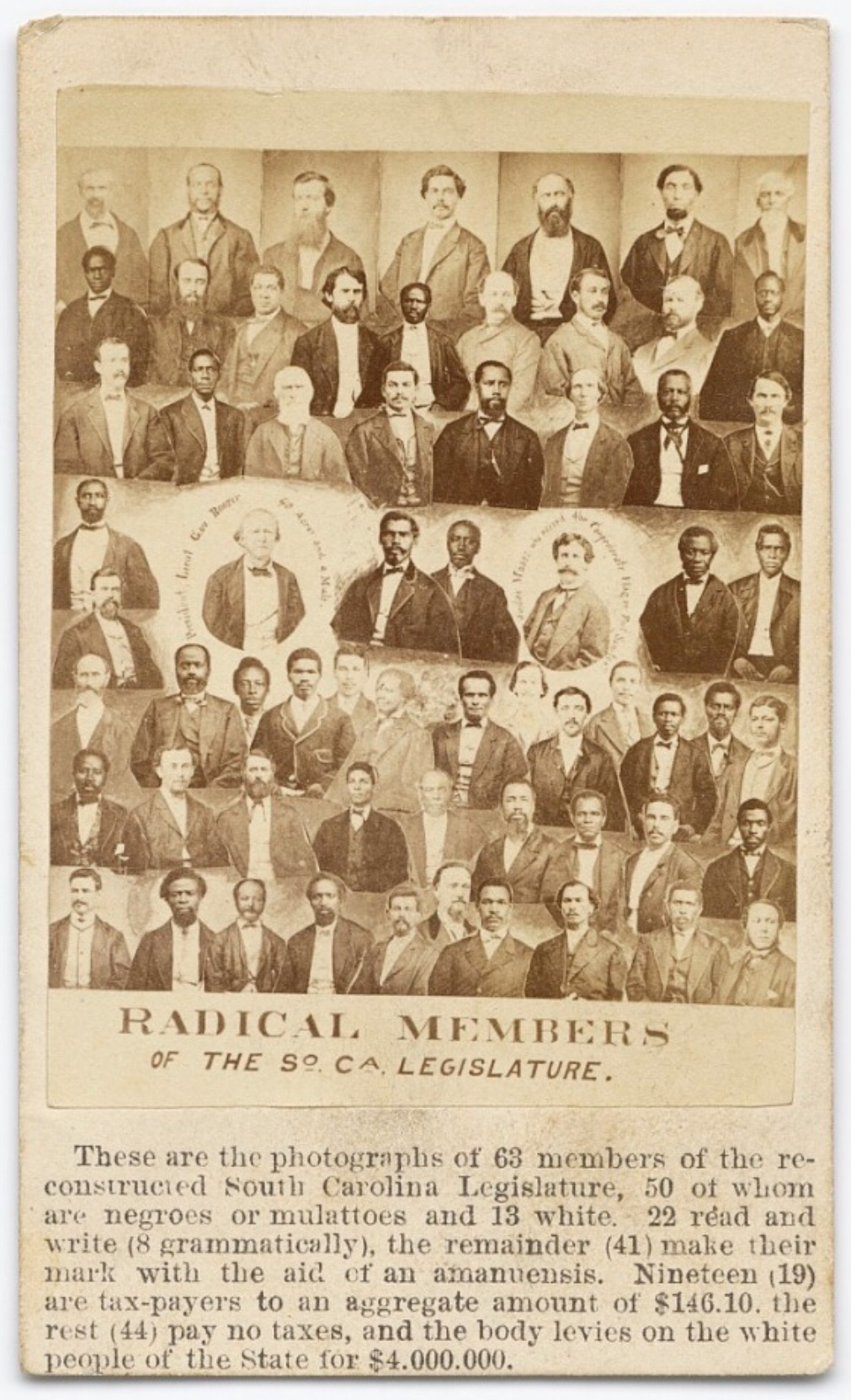
A composite of 63 "Radical Republicans" in the South Carolina Legislature in 1868, including fifty "negroes or mulattoes"

=== South Carolina Senate ===
- George W. Barber – Fairfield County 1868–1872
- Israel R. Bird – Fairfield County 1876
- Lawrence Cain – Edgefield County 1872–1876 (also South Carolina House)
- Richard H. Cain – Charleston County 1868 (also U.S. Congress, South Carolina House, South Carolina Constitutional Convention, South Carolina Attorney General, city council)
- Henry Cardozo – Kershaw County 1870–1874
- Frederick A. Clinton – Lancaster County 1868–1877
- Samuel L. Duncan – Orangeburg County 1876–1880 (also South Carolina House)
- Sanders Ford – Fairfield County 1872–1873
- Samuel E. Gaillard – Charleston County 1870–1877
- 1868
- Samuel Green – Beaufort County 1875–1877 (also South Carolina House)
- Charles D. Hayne – Aiken County 1872–1876 (also South Carolina House, South Carolina Constitutional Convention, Secretary of State, and postmaster)
- Henry E. Hayne – Marion County 1868–1872 (also South Carolina Constitutional Congress and Secretary of State)
- William R. Hoyt – Colleton County 1868
- James L. Jamison – Orangeburg County 1870
- William R. Jervey – Charleston County 1872 (also South Carolina House and South Carolina Constitutional Convention)
- William E. Johnston – Sumter County 1869–1877 (also South Carolina House)
- William H. Jones – Georgetown County 1872–1876 (also South Carolina House)
- John Lee – Chester County 1872 (also postmaster)
- Huston J. Lomax – Abbeville County 1870 (Note: Lomax was elected to the South Carolina House in 1869 but died in January 1870 before the legislature convened.) (also South Carolina Constitutional Convention)
- Moses Martin – Fairfield County 1873–1876
- Henry J. Maxwell – Marlboro County 1868 (also postmaster)
- Thomas E. Miller – Beaufort County 1874–1880 (also U.S. Congress, South Carolina House, South Carolina Constitutional Convention)
- William Fabriel Myers – Colleton County 1874–1878
- William B. Nash – Richland County 1868–1877 (also South Carolina Constitutional Convention)
- Joseph H. Rainey – Georgetown County 1868–1870 (also U.S. Congress and South Carolina Constitutional Convention)
- Benjamin F. Randolph – Orangeburg County 1868 (also South Carolina Constitutional Convention) (Note: Assassinated by the Ku-Klux Klan, according to H. A. Wallace.)
- Thomas J. Reynolds – Beaufort County 1884–1887
- Hamilton Robinson – Beaufort County
- Robert Simmons – Berkeley County 1882–1886
- Robert Smalls – Beaufort County 1870–1875 (also U.S. Congress, South Carolina House, South Carolina Constitutional Convention, and collector of customs)
- Stephen Atkins Swails – Williamsburg County 1868, and president pro tem of the Senate (also South Carolina Continental Convention and mayor)
- Dublin I. Walker – Chester County 1874–1877
- Jared D. Warley – Clarendon County 1874–1877 (also South Carolina House)
- John Hannibal White – York County
- Bruce H. Williams – Chester County 1876–1887
- Lucius Wimbush – Chester County 1868–1872
- Jonathan Jasper Wright – Beaufort County, South Carolina 1868 (also Associate Justice of South Carolina Supreme Court)

=== South Carolina House of Representatives ===
- Frank Adamson – Kershaw County 1870–1874
- William Adamson – Kershaw County 1869–1870
- Purvis Alexander – Chester County 1876
- Jacob C. Allman – Marion County 1872–1876
- Robert B. Anderson – Georgetown County 1890–1898 (also postmaster)
- William J. Andrews – Sumter County 1874–1876
- Robert B. Artson – Charleston County 1872–1874
- Samuel J. Bampfield – Beaufort County 1874–1876 (also postmaster)
- George W. Barber – Fairfield County 1868–1872
- John B. Bascomb – Beaufort County 1870–1874
- J. A. Baxter – Georgetown County 1884–1890
- W. W. Beckett – Berkeley County 1882
- G. A. Bennett – Beaufort County 1868
- Daniel Bird – Fairfield County 1876
- W. A. Bishop – Greenville County 1868–1870
- John William Bolts – Georgetown County 1898–1902
- Benjamin A. Boseman Jr. – Charleston County 1868–1873 (South Carolina Constitutional Convention and postmaster)
- H. Boston – Clarendon County 1876
- John Boston – Darlington County 1868, 1872
- Joseph D. Boston – Newberry County 1868–1876
- James A. Bowley – Georgetown County 1869–1874
- E. M. Brayton – Aiken County 1874–1876
- Sampson S. Bridges – Newberry County 1872–1876
- Peter Bright – Charleston County 1874–1876
- Isaac Brockenton – Darlington County (also South Carolina Constitutional Convention)
- William J. Brodie – Charleston County 1876–1880
- Stephen C. Brown – Charleston County 1868, 1876
- Richard Bryan – Charleston County 1870–1874, 1876
- H. Z. Burchmeyer – Charleston County 1874–1876
- Barney Burton – Chester County 1868–1870 (also South Carolina Constitutional Convention)
- Benjamin Byas – Berkeley and Orangeburg counties 1870 (also South Carolina Constitutional Convention)
- Edward Israel. Cain – Orangeburg County 1868
- Everidge Cain – Abbeville County 1870–1874
- Lawrence Cain – Edgefield County 1868–1872 (also South Carolina Senate)
- Richard H. Cain – At-large 1868–1870 and 2nd District 1877 (also U.S. Congress, South Carolina Senate, South Carolina Attorney General, South Carolina Constitutional Convention, city council)
- Christian Wesley Caldwell – Orangeburg County 1876
- Benjamin F. Capers – Charleston County 1876
- John A. Chesnut – Kershaw County 1868 (also South Carolina Constitutional Convention)
- Caesar P. Chisolm – Colleton County 1882–1884
- J. E. Clyde – Charleston County
- Simon P. Coker – Barnwell County 1874
- Samuel Coleman – Chester County 1875–1876
- Augustus Collins – Clarendon County 1872–1876
- Wilson Cooke – Greenville County 1868 (also South Carolina Constitutional Congress)
- Andrew W. Curtis – Richland County 1872–1876
- Abram Dannerly – Orangeburg County 1872
- Nelson Davies – York County 1873–1876
- James Davis – Richland County
- Thomas A. Davis – Charleston County 1870–1876
- Robert C. De Large – Charleston County 1868 (also U.S. Congress, South Carolina Constitutional Convention, State Land Commissioner)
- M. R. Delaney – Charleston County
- F. DeMars – Orangeburg County 1868
- Eugene Herriot Dibble – Kershaw County 1876
- John Dix – Orangeburg County 1872
- Samuel B. Doiley – Charleston County 1874–1876
- Paul B. Drayton – Charleston County 1880
- William A. Driffle – Colleton County 1868–1870, 1880–1882
- Samuel L. Duncan – Orangeburg County 1872–1876 (also South Carolina Senate)
- S. C. Eckhard – Charleston County 1878–1880
- F. S. Edwards – Charleston County 1876
- W. T. Elfe – Charleston County 1878–1880
- Robert B. Elliott – Barnwell, Edgefield, and Aiken counties 1868, 1874; speaker of the house 1874–1876 (also U.S. Congress, South Carolina Attorney General, South Carolina Constitutional Convention, and county commissioner)
- William E. Elliott – Charleston County 1870
- Henry H. Ellison – Abbeville County 1870–1874
- John Evans – Williamsburg County 1876
- Phillip E. Ezekiel – Beaufort County 1868
- Simeon Farr – Union County 1868–1872
- Simeon Farrow – Union County 1874
- T. R. Fields – Beaufort County 1890
- Adam P. Ford – Charleston County 1870–1874
- Ellis Forrest – Orangeburg County 1876
- William H. Frazier – Colleton County 1872
- B. G. Frederick – Orangeburg County 1878–1880, 1882–1884
- John M. Freeman Jr. – Charleston County 1874
- Florian Henry Frost – Williamsburg County 1870
- Reuben Gaither – Kershaw County 1870–1877
- Hastings Gantt – Beaufort County 1870–1876, 1878–1884
- John Gardner – Edgefield County 1868
- William H. Gardner – Sumter County 1870
- Stephen Gary – Kershaw County 1870, 1874
- Ebenezer F. George – Kershaw County 1874
- John Gibson – Fairfield County 1876
- Fortune Giles – Williamsburg County 1870–1874
- John T. Gilmore – Richland County 1872–1874
- William C. Glover – Charleston County 1870
- Mitchell Goggins – Abbeville County 1870, 1874
- Aesop Goodson – Richland County 1868–1872
- David Graham – Edgefield County 1872–1876
- John G. Grant – Marlboro County 1868
- William A. Grant – Charleston County 1872
- W. H. W. Gray – Charleston County 1868
- Adam Green – Aiken County
- Charles Samuel Green – Georgetown County 1872–1878
- John Green – Edgefield County 1872
- Samuel Green – Beaufort County 1870–1875 (also South Carolina Senate)
- Ishom Greenwood – Newberry County 1872
- M. C. Hamilton – Beaufort County 1892–1894
- Thomas Hamilton – Beaufort County 1872–1876
- James J. Hardy – Charleston County 1870, 1871
- R. M. Harriett – Georgetown County 1874
- David Harris – Edgefield County 1868–1872
- Alfred Hart – Darlington County 1870
- Eben Hayes – Marion County 1868, 1872
- Charles D. Hayne – Barnwell County 1868 (also South Carolina Senate, South Carolina Constitutional Convention, Secretary of State, and postmaster)
- H. E. Hayne – Marion County
- James N. Hayne – Barnwell County 1868
- William A. Hayne – Marion County 1874
- Plato P. Hedges – Charleston County 1870
- James A. Henderson – Newberry County 1868, 1874
- John T. Henderson – Newberry County 1870
- Zachariah Hines – Darlington County
- Gloster H. Holland – Aiken County 1870–1874
- Abraham P. Holmes – Colleton County 1870–1874
- Allison W. Hough – Kershaw County 1872
- A. H. Howard – Marion County 1872
- W. R. Hoyt – Colleton County 1868
- Allen Hudson – Lancaster County 1870, 1874
- Richard H. Humbert – Darlington County 1871–1876
- Barney Humphries – Chester County 1868–1872
- Alfred T. B. Hunter – Laurens County 1874
- H. H. Hunter – Charleston County
- James Hutson – Newberry County 1868
- Austin Jackson – Barnwell County 1874
- Henry Jacobs – Fairfield County 1868 (also South Carolina Constitutional Convention)
- Burrell James – Sumter County 1868
- Paul W. Jefferson – Aiken County 1874
- William R. Jervey – Charleston County 1868 (also South Carolina Senate and South Carolina Constitutional Convention)
- D. I. J. Johnson – Chesterfield County 1868
- Griffin C. Johnson – Laurens County 1868–1872
- Henry Johnson – Fairfield County 1868
- John W. Johnson – Marion County 1872–1874
- Samuel Johnson – Charleston County 1868
- William E. Johnston – Sumter County 1868, 1869 (also South Carolina Senate)
- A. H. Jones – Charleston County 1874
- Marshall Jones – Orangeburg County 1886
- Paul E. Jones – Orangeburg County 1874
- William H. Jones – Georgetown County 1868–1872 (also South Carolina Senate)
- Samuel J. Keith – Darlington County 1870–1876
- William Keitt – Newberry County 1876
- P. R. Kinloch – Georgetown County 1876
- Jordan Lang – Darlington County 1868–1872 (also South Carolina Constitutional Convention)
- J. S. Lazarus – Charleston County 1876
- George H. Lee – Charleston County 1868
- John Lee – Chester County 1872
- Levi Lee – Fairfield County 1872
- Samuel J. Lee – Edgefield and Aiken counties 1868–1874
- J. J. Lesesne – Charleston County 1876
- John Lilley – Chester County 1872
- Joseph W. Lloyd – Charleston County 1870
- Aaron Logan – Charleston County 1870
- Huston J. Lomax – Abbeville County 1868
- William Lowman – Richland County 1876
- William Maree – Colleton County 1876–1880
- Thomas Martin – Abbeville County 1872
- Julius Mayer – Barnwell County 1868
- James P. Mays – Orangeburg County 1868–1872
- Harry McDaniels – Laurens County 1868
- Thomas D. McDowell – Georgetown County
- William McKinlay – Orangeburg and Charleston counties 1868 (also South Carolina Constitutional Congress and city council)
- John W. Mead – York County 1868–1872
- George M. Mears – Charleston County 1880–1892
- S. Melton – Clarendon County 1876
- Edward C. Mickey – Charleston County 1868–1872
- Benjamin Middleton – Barnwell County 1872
- F. F. Miller – Georgetown County 1868
- Isaac Miller – Fairfield County 1872
- M. Miller – Fairfield County 1872
- Thomas E. Miller – Beaufort County 1866, 1874–1880, 1886–1888, 1894–1896 (also U.S. Congress, South Carolina Constitutional Convention, and South Carolina Senate)
- James Mills – Laurens County 1872
- L. S. Mills – Beaufort County 1882
- Syphax Milton – Clarendon County 1870–1872, 1874–1876
- Charles S. Minort – Richland County 1872–1874
- F. S. Mitchell – Beaufort County 1884
- Junius S. Mobley – Union County 1868
- Alfred M. Moore – Fairfield County 1870
- Shadrack Morgan – Orangeburg County 1874–1876
- William C. Morrison – Beaufort County 1876
- William J. Moultrie – Georgetown County 1880–1884
- Nathaniel B. Myers – Beaufort County 1876
- William F. Myers – Colleton County 1870–1875
- Lee Nance – Newberry County
- Jonas W. Nash – Kershaw County 1868,1876
- ? Nehemiah – Beaufort County
- William Nelson – Clarendon County 1868
- Richard Neabitt – Charleston County 1874
- Frederick Nix Jr. – Barnwell County 1872 (also postmaster)
- Charles F. North – Charleston County 1872
- Samuel Nuckles – Union County 1868–1872 (also South Carolina Continental Congress)
- Nathaniel B. Myers – Beaufort County 1870–1875, 1876
- Joseph Alexander Owens – Barnwell County 1880
- Robert John Palmer – Richland County 1876
- Joseph Parker – Charleston County 1880
- Jeffrey Prendergrass – Williamsburg County 1868–1872
- Wade Perrin – Laurens County 1868, 1871
- James F. Peterson – Williamsburg County 1872–1878
- Edward Petty – Charleston County 1872
- William G. Pinckney – Charleston County 1874–1876; Berkeley County 1882–1884
- Thomas Pressley – Williamsburg County 1872
- Isaac Prioleau – Charleston County 1872–1874, 1876
- M. H. Priolean – Charleston County
- Henry W. Purvis – Lexington County 1868 (also South Carolina Adjunct General)
- Warren W. Ramsey – Sumter County 1869–1876
- Alonzo J. Ransier – Charleston County 1868 (also South Carolina Lt. Governor, U.S. House, U.S. Constitutional Convention)
- Cain Ravenel – Berkeley County 1882
- George A. Reed – Beaufort County 1872–1874, 1876
- W. H. Reedish – Orangeburg County 1876
- A. C. Reynolds – Beaufort County 1888
- J. C. Rice – Beaufort County 1886
- James Richardson – Colleton County
- Mark P. Richardson – Berkeley County 1890
- Thomas Richardson – Colleton County 1868–1870, 1874–1876
- Henry Riley – Orangeburg County 1872
- J. R. Rivers – Beaufort County 1882
- Prince Rivers – Edgefield and Aiken counties 1868–1874 (also South Carolina Constitutional Convention
- Joseph Robinson – Beaufort County 1876, 1880–1886
- John C. Rue – Beaufort County 1880
- Alfred Rush – Darlington County 1868, 1874
- Thaddeus Sasportas – Chester County 1868 (also South Carolina Constitutional Convention and postmaster)
- Sancho Saunders – Chester County 1868 (also South Carolina Constitutional Convention)
- Robert F. Scott – Williamsburg County 1868
- William C. Scott – Williamsburg County 1874
- W. H. Sheppard – Beaufort County 1884
- Henry L. Shrewsbury – Chesterfield County 1868
- Augustus Simkins – Edgefield County 1872–1876
- Aaron Simmons – Orangeburg County 1874–1876, 1882–1886, 1888–1890
- Benjamin Simmons – Beaufort County 1875–1876, 1878–1880
- Hercules Simmons – Colleton County 1874
- Limus Simons – Edgefield County 1872
- William Simons – Richland County 1868–1872, 1874–1876
- Paris Simpkins – Edgefield County 1872–1876
- Charles Sims – Chester County 1872
- Andrew Singleton – Berkeley County 1870
- Asbury L. Singleton – Sumter County 1870
- J. P. Singleton – Chesterfield County 1870
- James Singleton – Berkeley County 1882
- B. F. Smalls – Charleston County 1876
- Robert Smalls – Beaufort County 1868 (also South Carolina Senate, South Carolina Constitutional Convention, U.S. States Congress, and collector of customs)
- Sherman Smalls – Colleton County 1870–1874
- Rev. W. Smalls – Charleston County 1878
- James E. Smiley – Sumter County 1868
- Abraham W. Smith – Charleston County 1868, 1876
- Jackson A. Smith – Darlington County 1872–1876
- Powell Smythe – Clarendon County 1868
- Butler Spears – Sumter County 1872
- James A. Spencer – Abbeville County 1872
- Nathaniel T. Spencer – Charleston County 1872
- Charles H. Sperry – Georgetown County 1872
- Henry Steele – York County 1874
- D. Augustus Straker – Orangeburg County 1876, 1877, 1878, but was denied his seat all three times (also Inspector of Customs)
- Caesar Sullivan – Laurens County 1872
- Robert Tarlton – Colleton County 1870–1874
- John W. Thomas – Marlboro County 1870
- W. H. Thomas – Newberry County 1876
- William M. Thomas – Colleton County 1868–1876 (also South Carolina Constitutional Convention)
- Benjamin A. Thompson – Marion County 1868
- Joseph Thompson – Richland County 1874
- Samuel B. Thompson – Richland County 1868–1874 (also South Carolina Constitutional Convention)
- Julius C. Tingman – Charleston County 1872, 1876
- Robert Turner – Charleston County 1870–1876
- Richard M. Valentine – Abbeville County 1868
- John Vanderpool – Charleston County 1872–1876
- Dublin Walker – Chester County 1874–1877
- John Wallace – Orangeburg County 1870
- Thomas H. Wallace – Berkeley County 1890
- Jared D. Warley – Clarendon County 1870–1874 (also South Carolina Senate)
- J. J. Washington – Beaufort County 1886–1890
- Archie Weldon – Edgefield County 1874
- James Wells – Richland County 1876
- John W. Westberry – Sumter County 1874, 1878
- Ellison M. Weston – Richland County 1874
- William James Whipper – Beaufort County 1868–1872, 1875 (also South Carolina Constitutional Convention and probate judge)
- John Hannibal White – York County 1868
- Hannibal A. Wideman – Abbeville County 1872–1876
- James Wigg – Beaufort County 1890
- Charles McDuffie Wilder – Richland County 1868 (also postmaster and South Carolina Constitutional Convention)
- Bruce H. Williams – Georgetown County 1874
- James Clement Wilson – Sumter County 1872
- Zachariah Wines – Darlington County 1876
- John B. Wright – Charleston and York counties 1868–1872
- Smart Wright – Charleston County 1874
- James M. Young – Laurens County 1872–1876
- Prince Young – Chester County 1872

=== South Carolina Constitutional Convention ===
- Purvis Alexander – Chester County 1868
- T. Andrews – Sumter County
- John Bonum – Edgefield County 1868
- Benjamin A. Boseman Jr. – (South Carolina House and postmaster)
- Isaac Brockenton – Darlington County, 1868 (also South Carolina House)
- Barney Burton – Chester County 1868 (also South Carolina House)
- Benjamin Byas – Berkeley County 1868 (also South Carolina House)
- E. J. Cain – Orangeburg, South Carolina 1868
- Richard H. Cain – Charleston County 1868 (also U.S. Congress, city council, and South Carolina Senate, House, Attorney General, and Constitutional Convention)
- Francis Lewis Cardozo– Charleston County 1868 (also Secretary of State of South Carolina and South Carolina State Treasurer)
- John A. Chestnut – Kershaw County 1868 (also South Carolina House)
- Albert Clinton – Lancaster County 1868
- Samuel P. Coker
- Wilson Cooke – Greenville County 1868 (also South Carolina House)
- Nelson Davis – Laurens County 1868
- Robert C. De Large – Charleston County 1868 (also South Carolina House, U.S. Congress, State Land Commissioner)
- Abram Dogan – Union County 1868
- William Driffle – Colleton County 1868
- H. D. Edwards – Fairfield County 1868
- Robert B. Elliott – Edgefield County 1868 (also South Carolina House, South Carolina Attorney General, U.S. Congress, and county commissioner)
- Rice Foster – Spartanburg County 1868
- W. H. W. Gray – Berkeley County 1868
- David Harris – Edgefield County 1868
- C. D. Hayne – Barnwell County 1868
- Harry E. Hayne – Marion County 1868 (South Carolina Senate, South Carolina House, Secretary of State, and postmaster)
- James N. Hayne – Barnwell County 1868
- George Henderson – Newberry County 1868
- Richard Hubert – Darlington County 1868
- Allen Hudson, Lancaster County
- George Jackson – Marlboro County 1868
- Henry Jacobs – Fairfield County 1868 (also South Carolina House)
- William Jervey – Berkeley County 1868 (also South Carolina House and South Carolina Senate)
- J. W. Johnson – Marion County 1868
- Samuel Johnson – Anderson County 1868
- W. B. Johnson – Greenville County 1868
- W. E. Johnson – Sumter County 1868
- W. M. Joiner – Abbeville County 1868
- Charles Jones – Lancaster County 1868
- Henry Jones – Horry County 1868
- Jordan Lang – Darlington County 1868 (also South Carolina House)
- L. S. Langley – Beaufort County 1868
- George Lee – Berkeley County 1868
- Samuel Lee – Sumter County 1868
- Aaron Logan
- Huston J. Lomax – Abbeville County 1868 (also South Carolina Senate)
- Julius Mayer – Barnwell County 1868
- Harry McDaniels – Laurens County 1868
- W. J. McKinlay – Orangeburg County 1868
- William McKinlay – Charleston County 1868 (also South Carolina House and city council)
- J. W. Meade – York County 1868
- A. Middleton – Barnwell County 1868
- F. F. Miller – Georgetown County 1868
- Thomas E. Miller – 1895 (also U.S. Congress, South Carolina Senate, and South House)
- Lee Nance – Newberry County 1868
- William B. Nash – Richland County 1868 (also South Carolina Senate)
- William Nelson – Clarendon County 1868
- Samuel Nuckles – Union County 1868 (also South Carolina House)
- C. M. Olsen – Williamsburg County 1868
- Joseph Rainey – Georgetown County 1868 (also U.S. Congress and South Carolina Senate)
- Benjamin F. Randolph – Orangeburg County 1868 (also South Carolina Senate)
- Alonzo J. Ransier – Charleston County 1868 (also South Carolina Lt. Governor, U.S. Congress, South Carolina House)
- L. R. Reed – 1895
- Prince Rivers – Edgefield County 1868 (also South Carolina House)
- Sancho Sanders – Chester County 1868 (also South Carolina House)
- Thaddeous Sasportas – Orangeburg County 1868 (also South Carolina House and postmaster)
- H. L. Shrewsbury – Chesterfield County 1868
- Robert Smalls – Beaufort County 1868, 1895 (also U.S. Congress, South Carolina House, South Carolina Senate, and collector of customs)
- Calvin Stubbs – Marlboro County 1868
- Stephen Atkins Swails – Williamsburg County 1868 (also South Carolina Senate and mayor)
- William M. Thomas – Colleton County 1868 (South Carolina House)
- A. R. Thompson – Horry County 1868
- B. A. Thompson – Marion County 1868
- Samuel B. Thompson – Richland County 1865 (also South Carolina House)
- W. M. Viney – Colleton County 1868
- William James Whipper – Beaufort County 1868, 1895 (also South Carolina House and probate judge)
- J. H. White – York County 1868
- James Wigg – 1895
- Charles McDuffie Wilder – Richland County 1868 (also South Carolina House and postmaster)
- F. E. Wilder – Beaufort County 1868
- Thomas Williamson – Abbeville County 1868
- Coy Wingo – Spartanburg County 1868
- J. J. Wright – Beaufort County 1868

=== Other state offices ===
- Francis Lewis Cardozo – Secretary of State of South Carolina 1868–1872; South Carolina State Treasurer 1872–1877 (also South Carolina Constitutional Convention)
- R. C. De Large – State Land Commissioner 1870; State Commissioner Sinking Fund (also U.S. Congress, South Carolina House, and South Carolina Constitutional Congress)
- Robert B. Elliott – Attorney General of South Carolina 1876–1877 (also South Carolina House, U.S. Congress, South Carolina Constitutional Convention, South Carolina Senate, and county commissioner)
- J. E. Green – sergeant of arms South Carolina Senate
- Richard Theodore Greener – South Carolina school system commissioner 1875
- Harry E. Hayne – Secretary of State of South Carolina 1872–1878 and State Land Commissioner (South Carolina Senate, South Carolina House, South Carolina Constitutional Convention, and postmaster)
- Styles Hutchins – state judge (also Tennessee House of Representatives)
- Albert Osceola Jones – clerk of South Carolina House of Representatives 1868–1876
- Walter R. Jones – secretary of the State Financial Board (also city council clerk)
- Henry W. Purvis – Adjunct General 1872–1876 (also South Carolina House)
- John Williams – Sergeant at Arms of the South Carolina House of Representatives
- Jonathan Jasper Wright – Associate Justice of South Carolina Supreme Court 1870–1877 (also South Carolina Senate) (Note: Wright was the first African American to occupy a judicial position in the United States.)

=== Federal offices ===
- Robert B. Anderson – postmaster of Georgetown March 16, 1898 – February 28, 1902 (also South Carolina House
- Frazier B. Baker – postmaster of Effingham March 15, 1892 – September 2, 1893; Lake City July 30, 1897 – February 22, 1898 (Note: Murdered during a white mob attack on February 22, 1898.)
- Samuel Bampfield – postmaster of Beaufort October 5, 1897 – February 2, 1900 (also South Carolina House)
- Robert R. Bethea – postmaster of Latta July 31, 1890 – August 16, 1894
- Benjamin A. Boseman – postmaster of Charleston March 18, 1873 – February 23, 1881 (also South Carolina Constitutional Convention and South Carolina House)
- William E. Boykin – postmaster of Mayesville April 12, 1882 – September 10, 1885
- Israel W. Brown – postmaster of Hardeeville July 20, 1883 – April 4, 1885
- Marion F. Campbell – postmaster of Beaufort February 28, 1891 – April 8, 1893
- Richard J. Cochran – postmaster of Bucksville October 6, 1890 – January 16, 1895
- Joseph S. Collins – postmaster of Eastover February 18, 1898 – October 15, 1900
- Harriet "Hattie" R. Commander – postmaster of Chesterfield June 11, 1889 – December 11, 1893
- John Z. Crook – postmaster of St George May 14, 1883 – January 23, 1890; April 29, 1885 – January 20, 1894
- Eliza H. Davis – postmaster of Summerville July 23, 1873 – September 10, 1884
- James A. Davison – postmaster of Blackville March 20, 1890 – October 2, 1897; September 19, 1893 –April 5, 1906
- Adam C. Dayson – postmaster of Stono June 6, 1892 – February 28, 1895
- Wesley S. Dixon – postmaster of Barnwell February 23, 1882 – January 11, 1884
- A. H. Durant – postmaster of Marion August 25, 1884 – May 18, 1885
- Julius Durant – postmaster of Paxville July 21, 1897 – November 11, 1908
- Philip E. Ezekiel – postmaster of Beaufort July 17, 1871 – February 26, 1887
- Lawrence Faulkner – postmaster of Society Hill October 17, 1877 – May 17, 1889
- Irving T. Fleming – postmaster of Magnolia (became Lynchburg in 1905) January 26, 1898 – January 12, 1911
- Theodore B. Gordon – postmaster of Conway August 12, 1891 – June 12, 1894
- John D. Graham – postmaster of Sheldon October 15, 1890 – December 20, 1899; April 19, 1898 – December 31, 1905
- Charles Samuel Green – postmaster of Plantersville October 26, 1883 – May 12, 1885 (also South Carolina House)
- Moses W. Harrall – postmaster of Timmonsville March 3, 1884 – July 24, 1889; January 16, 1885 – January 30, 1894
- Charles D. Hayne – postmaster of Aiken March 23, 1869 – January 23, 1871 (South Carolina Constitutional Convention, South Carolina Secretary of State, South Carolina House, and South Carolina Senate)
- James H. Holloway – postmaster of Marion Court House September 9, 1870 – August 25, 1884
- Louisa C. Jones – postmaster of Ridgeland September 30, 1897 – January 7, 1910
- Robert M. Keene – postmaster of Statesburg August 16, 1889 – October 9, 1893
- Moses J. Langley – postmaster of Chopee March 15, 1890 – May 2, 1894
- John Lee – postmaster of Chester April 27, 1875 – November 27, 1876 (also South Carolina Senate)
- Edward D. Littlejohn – postmaster of Gaffney May 7, 1892 – November 4, 1893
- Major D. Macfarlan – postmaster of Cheraw July 9, 1892 – November 13, 1897; December 9, 1893 – April 23, 1900
- John W. Manigault – postmaster of Providence December 21, 1889 – September 4, 1890
- John C. Mardenborough – postmaster of Port Royal December 31, 1879 – February 1, 1898; August 18, 1885 – February 23, 1905
- Henry J. Maxwell – postmaster of Bennettsville March 16, 1869 – November 16, 1870 (also South Carolina Senate)
- John J. Mays – postmaster of Branchville February 25, 1883 – February 29, 1885
- Benjamin W. Middleton – postmaster of Midway March 24, 1870 – December 16, 1872
- Mary S. Middleton – postmaster of Midway December 16, 1872 – August 30, 1875
- Isaac R. Miller – postmaster of Bishopville February 26, 1890 – July 31, 1890
- J. W. Moody – postmaster of Mullins July 3, 1884 – September 17, 1889; May 4, 1885 – December 26, 1893
- W. J. Moultrie – postmaster of Georgetown July 22, 1884 – August 2, 1886
- William Emory Nichols – postmaster of Nichols July 30, 1890 – August 4, 1891
- Frederick Nix Jr. – postmaster of Blackville August 7, 1879 – May 11, 1885 (also South Carolina House)
- William A. Paul – postmaster of Walterborough February 14, 1884 – May 17, 1889; June 12, 1885 – May 23, 1893
- John T. Rafra – postmaster of Society Hill May 17, 1889 – September 22, 1893
- Edward C. Rainey – postmaster of Georgetown January 11, 1875 – June 7, 1877
- Laura Reed – postmaster of Edisto Island May 30, 1898 – September 21, 1908; March 12, 1901 – January 12, 1910
- John J. Reynolds – postmaster of Verdery May 24, 1889 – November 11, 1890
- Alexander S. Richardson – postmaster of Chester September 22, 1873 – April 27, 1875
- Joseph V. Rivers – postmaster of Lady's Island March 19, 1879 – September 8, 1885
- Thomas Robinson – postmaster of Bamberg December 27, 1883 – April 21, 1885
- Thaddeus Sasportas – postmaster of Orangeburg March 19, 1869 – February 17, 1870 (also South Carolina House and South Carolina Constitutional Convention)
- Edward J. Sawyer – postmaster of Bennettsville August 27, 1883 – May 9, 1892; June 29, 1885 – November 13, 1893
- Daniel Sanders – postmaster of Walterborough March 31, 1873 – February 14, 1884
- Robert Smalls – Collector of Customs at Beaufort 1899–1913 (also U.S. Congress, South Carolina House, South Carolina Senate, and South Carolina Constitutional Convention) (Note: Smalls lost this position in 1913 when newly installed President Woodrow Wilson segregated federal offices.)
- Ishmael H. Smith – postmaster of Port Royal June 22, 1889 – August 9, 1893
- Frances J. M. Sperry – postmaster of Georgetown September 27, 1890 – June 19, 1893
- Robert H. Stanley – postmaster of Dovesville July 29, 1889 – December 26, 1893
- D. Augustus Straker – Inspector of Customs at the port of Charleston (also South Carolina House).
- Robert A. Stewart – postmaster of Manning May 17, 1889 – December 26, 1893
- William D. Tardif Jr. – postmaster of Foreston March 3, 1884 – May 1885
- Robert S. Tarleton – postmaster of White Hall August 20, 1883 – April 22, 1885
- Henry C. Tindal – postmaster of Paxsville March 12, 1891 – December 26, 1893
- Cohen Whithead or Whitiehead – postmaster of Kingstree July 26, 1877 – October 25, 1886
- Charles McDuffie Wilder – postmaster of Columbia April 5, 1869 – June 2, 1885 (also South Carolina House and South Carolina Constitutional Convention)
- Joshua E. Wilson – postmaster of Florence February 8, 1876 – January 27, 1885; March 24, 1890 – July 18, 1899; April 9, 1883 – March 9, 1886; May 11, 1894 – September 1, 1909
- Zachariah Wines – postmaster of Society Hill October 30, 1897 – November 23, 1904 (also South Carolina House)

=== Local offices ===
- Ennals J. Adams – Charleston City Council 1868
- Macon B. Allen – judge of Charleston County Criminal Court 1873; probate judge for Charleston County 1876 (also a justice of the peace in Massachusetts) (Note: Allen was the first African American elected to a municipal judgeship in the United States.)
- Harrison N. Bouey – Edgefield County probate judge in 1875 (Note: Bouey was elected county sheriff in 1876 but was not granted the position.)
- Malcom Brown – Charleston City Council 1869
- Richard H. Cain – Charleston City Council 1868 (U.S. Congress and South Carolina Attorney General, Senate, House, Constitutional Convention)
- Richard Dereef – Charleston City Council 1868
- Robert B. Elliott – Barnwell County commissioner (also U.S. Congress, South Carolina Attorney General, South Carolina Constitutional Convention, and South Carolina House)
- W. G. Fields – Charleston City Council 1874
- S. B. Garrett – Charleston City Council 1874
- John A. Godfrey – Charleston City Council 1874
- John Gordon – Charleston City Council 1874
- R. N. Gregorie – Charleston City Council 1874
- William R. Hampton – Charleston City Council 1869
- Richard Holloway – Charleston City Council 1869
- Robert Howard – Charleston City Council 1868, 1869
- Walter R. Jones – Clerk of the City Council of Columbia (also State Financial Board)
- William McKinlay – Charleston City Council 1868, 1869, 1874 (also South Carolina House and South Carolina Constitutional Congress)
- A. B. Mitchell – Charleston City Council 1874
- B. Moncrief – Charleston City Council 1874
- George Shrewsbury – Charleston City Council 1874
- Thomas Small – Charleston City Council 1869
- Stephen Atkins Swails – mayor of Kingstree 1868 (also South Carolina Senate)
- Philip Thorne – Charleston City Council 1869
- James Wagoner – York County trial justice
- Edward P. Wall – Charleston City Council 1868, 1869
- Launcelot F. Wall – Charleston City Council 1869
- William Weston – Charleston City Council 1868
- William James Whipper – judge of probate Beaufort County (also South Carolina House and South Carolina Constitutional Convention) (Note: Whipper was elected by the legislature as a Circuit Court Judge, but Governor Chamberlain refused to commission him.)

== Tennessee ==
Only one African American served in the Tennessee Legislature during the 1870s, but more than a dozen followed in the 1880s as Republicans retook the governorship. They advocated for schools for African Americans, spoke against segregated public facilities, and advocated for voting rights protections.

=== Tennessee House of Representatives ===
- John W. Boyd – Tipton County 1881 Weakley County 1883 (also magistrate)
- Thomas F. Cassels – Shelby County 1881
- Greene E. Evans – Shelby County 1885
- William A. Feilds – Shelby County 1885 (also justice of the peace)
- Jesse M. H. Graham – Montgomery County, 1895
- William C. Hodge – Hamilton County 1885 (also alderman)
- Leon Howard – Shelby County 1883
- Styles Hutchins – Hamilton County 1887–1888 (also state judge in South Carolina)
- Sampson W. Keeble – Davidson County 1871 (also magistrate)
- Samuel A. McElwee – Haywood County 1879–1883
- Isham F. Norris – Shelby County 1881
- David F. Rivers – Fayette County 1883, was reelected for the 1885 term but forced to leave the county
- Thomas A. Sykes – Davidson County 1877, 1881 (he also served in the North Carolina House)

=== Other state offices ===
- James H. Sumner – door-keeper of the Tennessee House of Representatives 1867–1869

=== Other state and federal offices ===
- James Carroll Napier – State Department Clerk (also Nashville Board of Aldermen)

=== Local offices ===
- John W. Boyd – magistrate in Tipton County 1876–1882, 1885 ?–1906 (also Tennessee House)
- Randall Brown – Davidson County commissioner
- William A. Feilds – Shelby County justice of the peace (also Tennessee House)
- Charles Gowdey – Nashville Board of Aldermen
- William C. Hodge – 4th Ward of Chattanooga alderman 1878–1887 (also Tennessee House)
- Sampson W. Keeble – Davidson County magistrate 1877–1882 (also Tennessee House)
- James Carroll Napier – Nashville Board of Aldermen (also State Department Clerk)
- William Bennett Scott Sr. – mayor of Maryville 1869
- Josiah T. Settle – Assistant Attorney General for Shelby County 1885–1887 (also Mississippi House)

== Texas ==
During the Reconstruction era, four African Americans won election to the Texas Senate and 32 to the Texas House of Representatives.

=== Texas Senate ===
- Walter Moses Burton – Austin, Fort Bend, and Wharton counties 1874–1876; Fort Bend, Waller, and Wharton counties 1876–1883
- Matthew Gaines – District 16/Lee County 1870–1873
- Walter E. Riptoe – Harrison County 1876–1881
- George Ruby – Brazoria, Galveston, and Matagorda counties 1870–1871, 1873 (also Texas Constitutional Convention)

=== Texas House of Representatives ===
- David Abner Sr. – Harrison and Rusk counties 1874 (also Texas Constitutional Convention)
- Richard Allen – Harris and Montgomery counties 1870, 1873
- Edward Anderson – Harris and Montgomery counties 1873 (Note: Unseated after being sworn into office.)
- Alexander Asberry – Robertson County 1889
- Houston A. P. Bassett – Grimes County 1887
- Thomas Beck – Grimes County 1874, 1879
- D. W. Burley – Robertson, Leon, and Freestone counties 1870
- Silas Cotton – Robertson, Leon, and Freestone counties 1870
- Goldsteen Dupree – Montgomery and Harris counties 1870
- Robert J. Evans – Grimes County 1879–1883
- Jacob E. Freeman – Waller, Fort Bend, and Wharton counties 1874, 1880
- Harriel G. Geiger – Robertson County 1879, 1881
- Bedford G. Guy – Washington County 1879
- Nathan H. Haller – Brazoria County 1892–1897
- Jeremiah J. Hamilton – Fayette and Bastrop counties 1870
- William H. Holland – Waller, Fort Bend, and Wharton counties 1876
- Mitchell Kendall – Harrison County 1870 (also Texas Constitutional Convention)
- Robert A. Kerr – Bastrop County 1881
- Doc C. Lewis – Wharton County 1881
- Elias Mayes – Brazos County 1879, 1889
- David Medlock – Limestone, Falls, and McLennan counties 1870
- John Mitchell – Burleson, Brazos, and Milam counties 1870; Burleson and Washington counties 1873 (also Texas Constitutional Convention)
- E. C. Mobley – Robertson County 1882
- Henry Moore – Harrison County 1870, 1873
- Robert J. Moore – Washington County 1883–1889
- Sheppard Mullens – McLennan County 1870
- Edward Patton – San Jacinto and Polk counties 1891
- Henry Phelps – Wharton, Austin, and Fort Bend counties 1872
- Meshack R. Roberts – Fifth District/Rusk and Harrison counties 1873, 1875; Tenth District/Harrison County 1877
- Alonzo Sledge – Washington and Burleson counties 1879
- Robert Lloyd Smith – Colorado County 1895–1899
- Henry Sneed – Waller, Wharton, and Fort Bend counties 1877
- James H. Stewart – 48th District/Robertson County 1885
- James H. Washington – Grimes County 1873
- Allen W. Wilder – Washington County 1873
- Benjamin Franklin Williams – 25th District/Lavaca and Colorado counties 1871; 37th District/Waller, Fort Bend, and Wharton counties 1879; 53rd District/Waller and Fort Bend counties 1885 (also Texas Constitutional Convention)
- Richard Williams – Walker, Grimes, and Madison counties 1870, 1873
- George W. Wyatt – Waller and Fort Bend counties 1883

=== Texas Constitutional Convention ===
- David Abner Sr. – District 5/Harrison and Rusk counties 1875 (also Texas House)
- Charles W. Bryant – Harris County 1868–1869
- Stephen Curtis – Brazos County 1868–1869
- Bird Davis – Wharton County 1875
- Melvin Goddin – 15th District 1875
- Wiley Johnson – Harrison County 1868–1869
- Mitchell Kendall – Harrison County 1868–1869 (also Texas House)
- Ralph Long – Limestone, Navarro, and Hill counties 1868–1869
- Lloyd Henry McCabe – Fort Bend County 1875
- James McWashington – Montgomery County 1868–1869
- John Mitchell – Burleson and Washington counties 1875 (also Texas House)
- Sheppard Mullens – McLennan County 1868 (also Texas House)
- William Reynolds – Waller County 1875
- George Ruby – Brazoria, Galveston, and Matagorda counties 1868–1869 (also Texas Senate)
- Benjamin O. Watrous – Washington County 1868–1869
- Benjamin Franklin Williams – 1868–1869 (also Texas House)

=== Federal offices ===
- Norris Wright Cuney – United States Collector of Customs Port of Galveston 1889 (Board of Aldermen)
- Jasper N. Hamilton – postmaster of Eylau April 10, 1890 – June 11, 1895

=== Local offices ===
- Norris Wright Cuney – 12th district member of the Galveston Board of Aldermen 1883 (also U.S. Customs Collector)

== Vermont ==
=== Local offices ===
- Stephen Bates, Sheriff of Vergennes and the first Black chief law enforcement officer in Vermont history, 1879

== Virginia ==
In 2012, the Virginia Senate enacted Joint Resolution No. 89, recognizing that Reconstruction in Virginia lasted from 1869 to 1890 due to Jim Crow laws; federal Reconstruction ended in 1877.

=== Senate of Virginia ===
- James W. D. Bland – Prince Edward County 1869 (also Virginia Constitutional Convention)
- Cephas L. Davis – Mecklenburg County 1879
- John M. Dawson – Charles City, Elizabeth City, James City, Warwick, and York counties 1874–1877
- Joseph P. Evans – Petersburg 1874
- Nathaniel M. Griggs – Prince Edward County 1887–1890
- James R. Jones Mecklenburg County – 1875–1877 and 1881–1883
- Isaiah L. Lyons – Surry, York, Elizabeth City, and Warwick counties 1869–1871
- William P. Moseley – Goochland County 1869–1871 (also Virginia Constitutional Convention)
- Francis "Frank" Moss – Buckingham County 1869–1871 (also Virginia House and Virginia Constitutional Convention)
- Daniel M. Norton – James City and York counties 1871–1873 and 1877–1887 (also Virginia Constitutional Convention)
- Guy Powell – Nottoway, Lunenburg and Brunswick counties 1875–1878
- John Robinson – Cumberland County 1869–1873 (also Virginia Constitutional Convention)
- William N. Stevens – Petersburg 1871–1878 and Sussex County 1881 (also Virginia House)
- George Teamoh – Norfolk County 1869–1871 (also Virginia Constitutional Convention)

=== Virginia House of Delegates ===
- William H. Andrews – Surry County 1869–1871 (also Virginia Constitutional Convention)
- William H. Ash – Amelia and Nottoway counties 1887
- Briton Baskerville, Jr. – Mecklenburg County 1887
- Edward David Bland – Prince George and Surry counties 1879–1884
- Phillip S. Bolling – Cumberland and Buckingham counties; elected in 1883 but was ruled ineligible
- Samuel P. Bolling – Cumberland and Buckingham counties 1883–1887
- Tazewell Branch – Prince Edward County 1874–1877
- William H. Brisby – New Kent County 1869–1871
- Goodman Brown – Prince George and Surry counties 1887
- Peter J. Carter – Northampton County 1871–1878
- Matt Clark – Halifax County 1874
- George William Cole – Essex County 1879
- Asa Coleman – Halifax County 1871–1873
- Johnson Collins – Brunswick County 1879
- Aaron Commodore – Essex County 1875–1877
- Miles Connor – Norfolk County 1875–1877
- Henry Cox – Chesterfield and Powhatan counties 1869–1877
- Isaac Dabbs – Charlotte County 1875–1877
- McDowell Delaney – Amelia County 1871–1873
- Amos Andre Dodson – Mecklenburg County 1883
- Shed Dungee – Cumberland and Buckingham counties 1879–1882
- Jesse Dungey – King William County 1871–1873
- Isaac Edmundson – Halifax County 1869–1871
- Ballard T. Edwards – Chesterfield and Powhatan counties 1869–1871
- Joseph P. Evans – Petersburg 1871–1873 (also Virginia Senate)
- William D. Evans – Prince Edward County 1877–1880
- William W. Evans – Petersburg 1887
- William Faulcon – Prince George and Surry counties 1885–1887
- George Fayerman – Petersburg 1869–1871
- James A. Fields – Elizabeth City and James City counties 1889
- Alexander Q. Franklin – Charles City County 1889
- John Freeman – Halifax County 1871
- William Gilliam – Prince George County 1871–1875
- James P. Goodwyn – Petersburg 1874
- Armistead Green – Petersburg 1881–1884
- Robert G. Griffin – James City and York counties 1883
- Nathaniel M. Griggs – Prince Edward County 1883 (also Virginia Senate)
- Ross Hamilton – Mecklenburg County 1869–1882, 1889
- Alfred W. Harris – Petersburg 1881–1888
- H. Clay Harris – Halifax County 1874–1875
- Henry C. Hill – Amelia County 1874–1875
- Charles E. Hodges – Norfolk County 1869–1871
- John Q. Hodges – Princess Anne County 1869–1871
- Henry Johnson – Amelia and Nottoway counties 1889–1890
- Benjamin Jones – Charles City County 1869–1871
- James R. Jones – Mecklenburg County 1885–1887 (also Virginia Senate)
- Peter K. Jones – Greensville County 1869–1877 (also Virginia Constitutional Convention)
- Robert G. W. Jones – Charles City County 1869–1871
- Rufus S. Jones – Elizabeth City and Warwick counties 1871–1875
- William H. Jordan – Petersburg 1885–1887
- Alexander G. Lee – Elizabeth City and Warwick 1877–1879
- Neverson Lewis – Chesterfield and Powhatan counties 1879–1882
- James F. Lipscomb – Cumberland County 1869–1877
- William P. Lucas – Louisa County 1874–1875
- John W. B. Matthews – Petersburg 1871–1873
- J. B. Miller Jr. – Goochland County 1869–1871
- Peter G. Morgan – Petersburg 1869–1871 (also Virginia Constitutional Convention and city council)
- Francis "Frank" Moss – Buckingham County 1874 (also Virginia Senate and Virginia Constitutional Convention)
- Armistead S. Nickens – Lancaster County 1871–1875
- Frederick S. Norton – James City and Williamsburg counties 1869–1871
- Robert Norton – Elizabeth City and York counties 1869–1872, 1881
- Alexander Owen – Halifax County 1869–1871
- Littleton Owens – Princess Anne County 1879–1882
- Richard G. L. Paige – Norfolk County 1871–1875, 1879–1882
- William H. Patterson – Charles City County 1871–1873
- Caesar Perkins – Buckingham County 1869–1871, 1878–1888, 1887
- Fountain M. Perkins – Louisa County 1869–1871
- John W. Poindexter – Louisa County 1875–1877
- Joseph B. Pope – Southampton County 1879
- Guy Powell – Brunswick County 1881 (also Virginia Senate)
- William H. Ragsdale – Charlotte County 1869–1871
- John H. Robinson – Elizabeth City and James City, and York counties 1887
- R. D. Ruffin – Dinwiddie County 1875
- Archer Scott – Amelia and Nottoway counties 1875–1877, 1879–1884
- George Lewis Seaton – Alexandria County 1869–1871
- Dabney Smith – Charlotte County 1881
- Henry D. Smith – Greensville County 18790
- Robert M. Smith – Elizabeth City and Warwick counties 1875–1877
- William N. Stevens – Sussex County 1869–1879 (also Virginia Senate)
- John B. Syphax – Arlington County 1874
- Henry Turpin – Goochland County 1871
- John Watson – Mecklenburg County 1869 (also Virginia Constitutional Convention)
- Maclin C. Wheeler – Brunswick County 1883
- Robert H. Whittaker – Brunswick County 1875–1877
- Ellis Wilson – Dinwiddie County 1869–1871

=== Virginia Constitutional Convention ===
- William H. Andrews – Surry County 1867–1868 (also Virginia House)
- James D. Barrett – Fluvanna County 1867–1868
- Thomas Bayne – Norfolk 1867–1868
- James W. D. Bland – Prince Edward County 1867–1868 (also Virginia Senate)
- William Breedlove – Essex County 1867–1868
- John Brown – Southampton County 1867–1868
- David Canada – Halifax County 1867–1868
- James B. Carter – Chesterfield and Powhatan counties 1867–1868
- Joseph Cox – Richmond 1867–1868
- John Wesley Cromwell – Clerk of the Virginia Constitutional Convention 1867
- Willis Augustus Hodges – Princess Anne County 1867–1868
- Joseph R. Holmes – Charlotte and Halifax counties 1867–1868
- Peter K. Jones – Greensville and Sussex counties 1867–1868 (also Virginia House)
- Samuel F. Kelso – Campbell County 1867–1868
- Lewis Lindsey – Richmond 1867–1868
- Peter G. Morgan – Petersburg 1867–1868 (also Virginia House and city council)
- William P. Moseley – Goochland County 1867–1868 (also Virginia Senate)
- Francis "Frank" Moss – Buckingham County 1867–1868 (also Virginia House and Virginia Senate)
- Edward Nelson – Charlotte County 1867–1868
- Daniel M. Norton – Yorktown 1867–1868 (also Virginia Senate)
- John Robinson – Cumberland County 1867–1868 (also Virginia Senate)
- James T. S. Taylor – Albemarle County 1867–1868
- George Teamoh – Portsmouth 1867–1868 (also Virginia Senate)
- Burwell Toler – Hanover County 1867–1868
- John Watson – Mecklenburg County 1867–1868 (also Virginia House)

=== Federal offices ===
- P. H. A. Braxton – collector at the United States Custom House in Westmoreland County (also constable)
- William Breedlow or Breedlove – postmaster of Tappahannock March 3, 1870 – March 13, 1871
- Robert H. Cauthorn – postmaster of Dunnsville September 21, 1897 – October 24, 1901
- James H. Cunningham – postmaster of Manchester September 20, 1869 – August 1, 1872
- William Henry Hayes – postmaster of Boydton June 17, 1889 – March 25, 1893
- John T. Jackson Sr. – postmaster of Alanthus March 23, 1891 – January 31, 1940
- William H. Johnson – postmaster of Baynesville November 29, 1893 – October 23, 1897
- Wade H. Mason – postmaster of Bluestone March 13, 1890 – November 14, 1902
- Isaac Morton – postmaster of Port Royal March 2, 1870 – October 29, 1872
- Daniel A. Twyman – postmaster of Junta August 12, 1898 – October 23, 1898

=== Local offices ===
- P. H. A. Braxton – King William County constable 1872 (also U.S. Custom House collector)
- Peter G. Morgan – Petersburg city council (also Virginia House and Virginia Constitutional Convention)
- V. Cook Nickens – constable of Leesburg Magisterial District 1873

== Washington ==
Washington did not have any African American legislators during Reconstruction.

=== Washington House of Representatives ===
- William Owen Bush – 1889–1895

== West Virginia ==
West Virginia did not have any African American legislators during the Reconstruction.

=== West Virginia House of Delegates ===
- Christopher Payne – Fayette County 1896 (also Consul General to the Danish West Indies 1903)

== Wyoming ==
Wyoming did not have any African American legislators during Reconstruction.

=== Wyoming Territorial House of Representatives ===
- William Jefferson Hardin – Laramie County 1879–1883 (Note: The next African American to serve in Wyoming's legislature was Liz Byrd who served in Wyoming's House and a few years later to the Wyoming Senate.)

== See also ==
- List of first African-American U.S. state legislators
- African-American officeholders in the United States, 1789–1866
- Disfranchisement after the Reconstruction era
- List of African-American officeholders (1900–1959)
- List of African–American Republicans
- List of African American firsts
- List of first African-American mayors
- List of African-American statewide elected officials
