= Guastavino =

Guastavino is a surname. Notable people with the surname include:

- Rafael Guastavino (1842–1908), Spanish architect and builder
- Rafael Guastavino III (1872–1950), Spanish architect
- Jean-Marie Guastavino (1886-1960), French politician
- Carlos Guastavino (1912-2000), Argentine composer
- Pedro Guastavino (born 1954), Argentine politician
- Diego Guastavino (born 1984), Uruguayan football player
- Vera Guastavino (born 1957), Belgian Physician

== See also ==
- Guastavino tile, patented by Rafael Guastavino in 1885
