= Guastavino tile =

Thin ornaments for a type of low brickwork vault

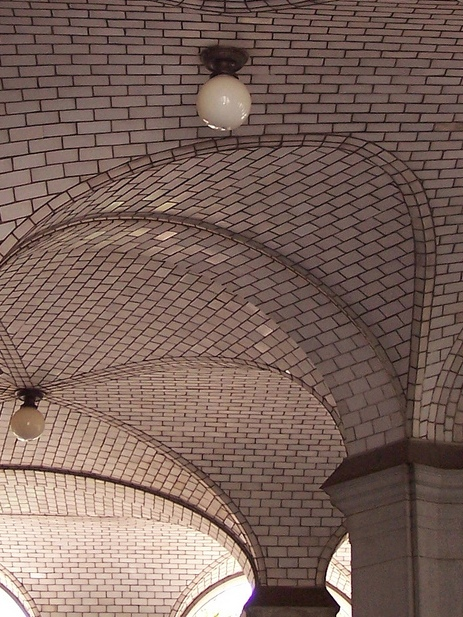
Guastavino ceiling tiles on the south arcade of the Manhattan Municipal Building

The Guastavino tile arch system is a thin-tile vault system introduced to the United States in 1885 by Spanish architect and builder Rafael Guastavino (1842–1908). It was patented in the United States by Guastavino in 1892. The Guastavino Fireproof Construction Company operated from 1889 to 1962, continuing with Rafael Guastavino Jr. following his father's death, and was headquartered in Woburn, Massachusetts, in a building of their own design which still stands. Their records and drawings are preserved by the Department of Drawings & Archives in the Avery Architectural and Fine Arts Library.

== Description ==
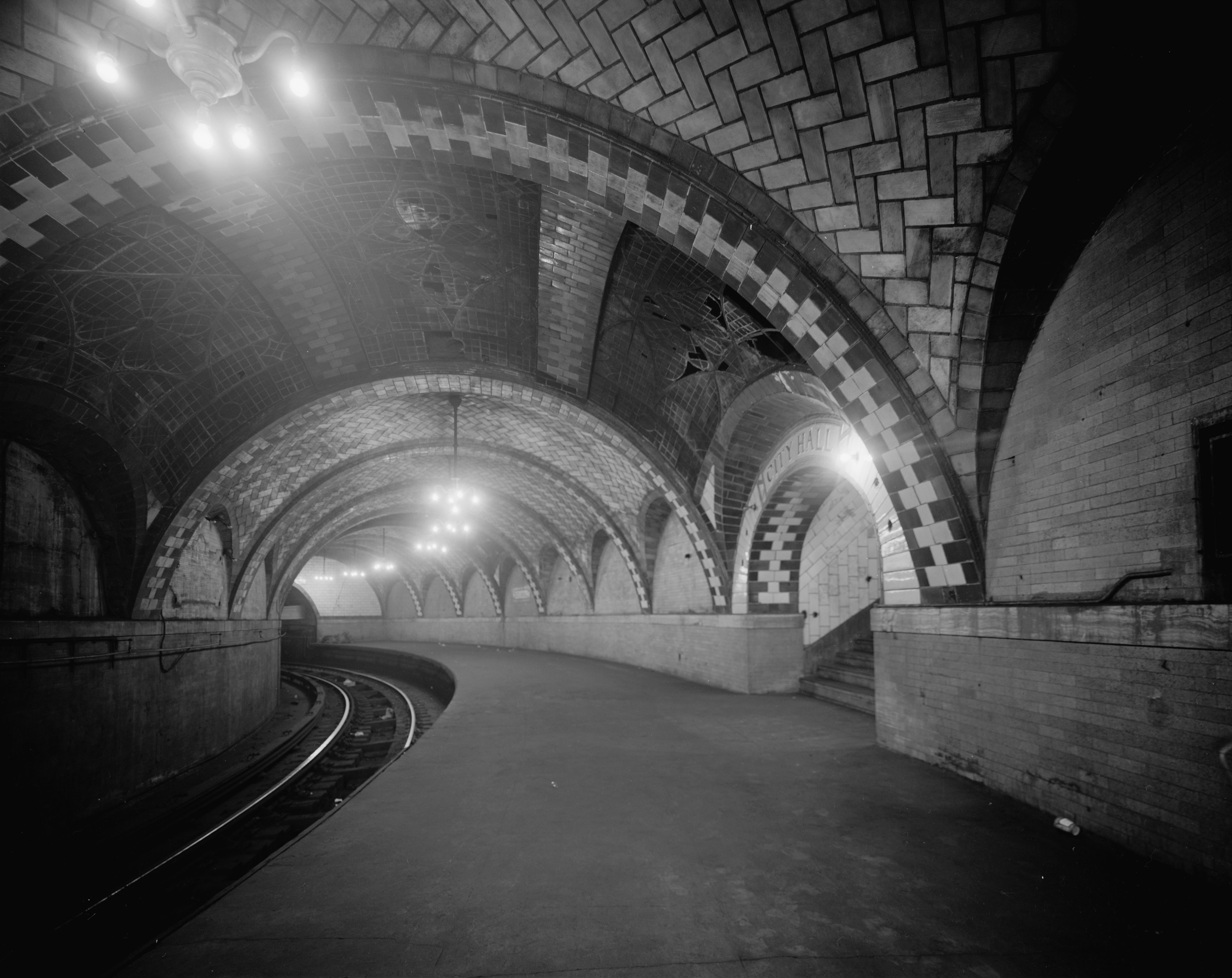
Guastavino tile vaulting in the City Hall station of the New York City Subway

Guastavino vaulting is a technique for constructing robust, self-supporting arches and architectural vaults using interlocking terracotta tiles and layers of mortar to form a thin skin, with the tiles following the curve of the roof as opposed to horizontally (corbelling), or perpendicular to the curve, as in Roman vaulting. The technique is known as timbrel vaulting (because of its supposed likeness to the skin of a timbrel or tambourine), Catalan vaulting, or "compression-only thin-tile vaulting".

The Guastavino terracotta tiles are standardized, less than 1 inch (25 mm) thick, and about 6 by 12 inches (150 by 300 mm) across. They are usually set in three herringbone-pattern courses with a sandwich of thin layers of Portland cement. Unlike heavier stone construction, these tile domes could be built without centering. Supporting formwork was still required for structural arches which established a framework for the ceiling. The large openings framed by the support arches were then filled with thin Guastavino tiles fabricated into domed surfaces. Each ceiling tile was cantilevered out over the open space, relying only on the quick-drying cements developed by the company.

Guastavino believed that his system represented an innovation in structural engineering, as his tile system allowed for architectural solutions that were impossible with traditional masonry arches and vaults. Subsequent research has shown the thin-tile vault is comparable to the masonry vault, but with a lighter weight, permitting flatter arch profiles. These flatter profiles would produce unacceptable horizontal thrust if constructed in thicker, heavier masonry.

Construction of Guastavino tile arches in McKim Building at Boston Public Library (1889)

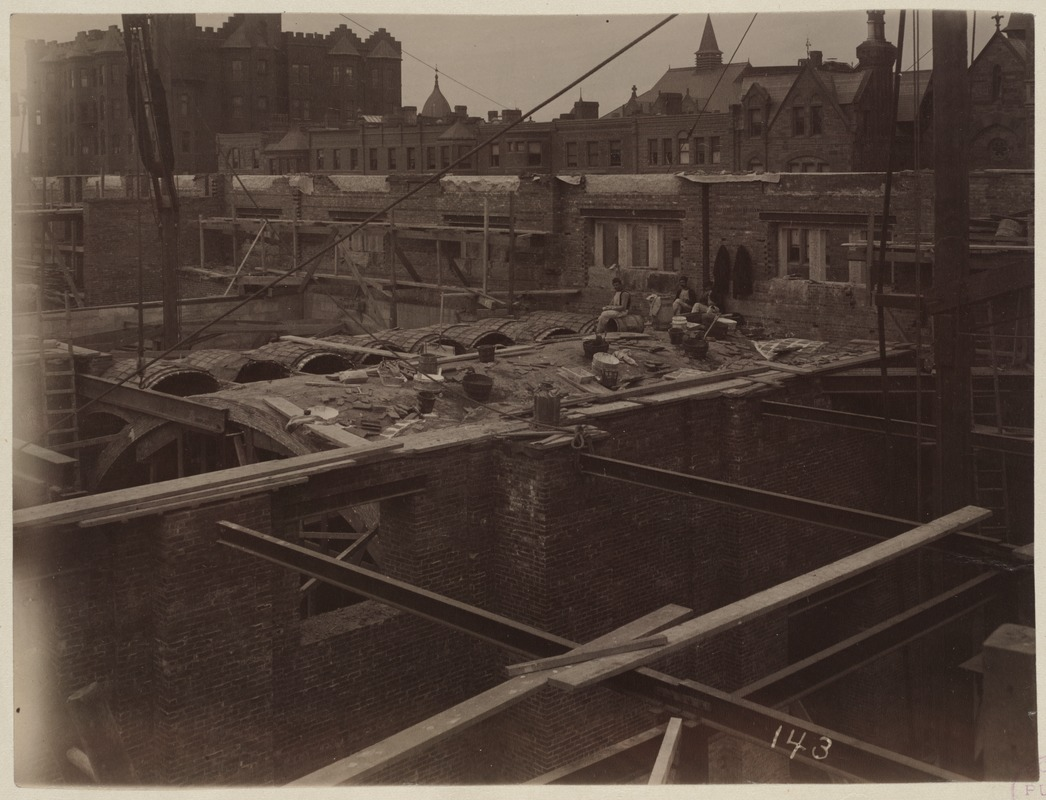
Steel I-beams framing the building provide structural support for Guastavino tile arches

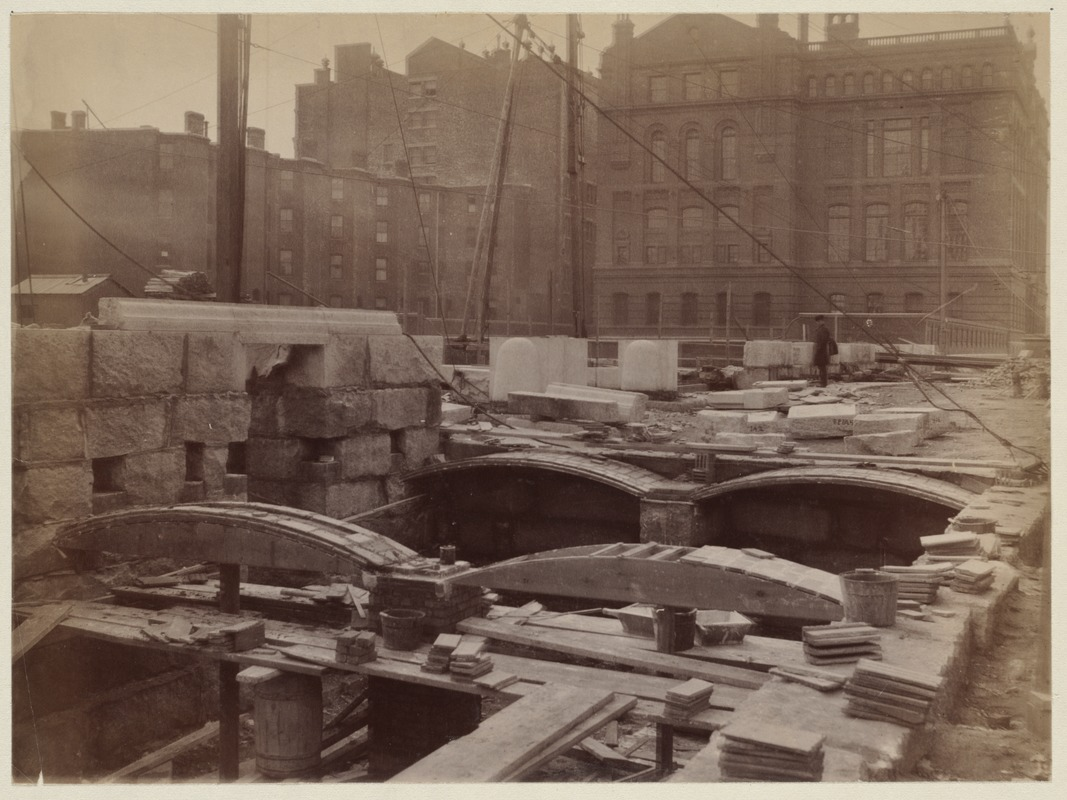
Formwork for shallow tile arches along Boylston Street

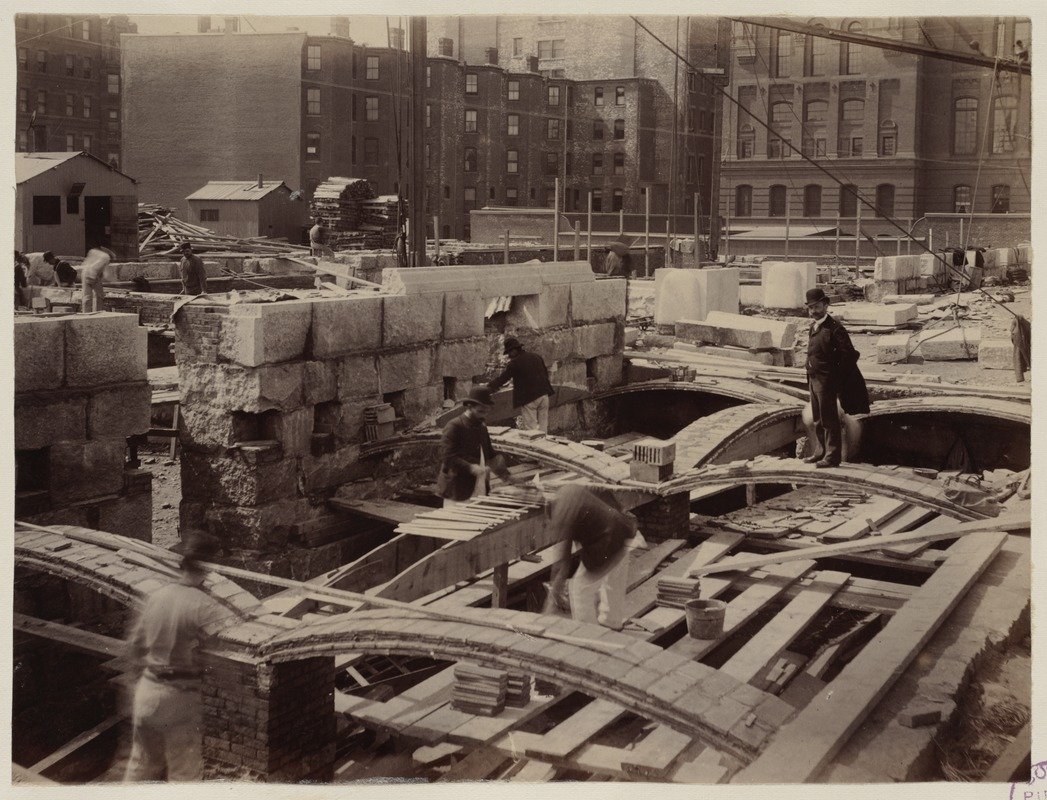
Rafael Guastavino inspecting recently laid tile arch along Boylston Street

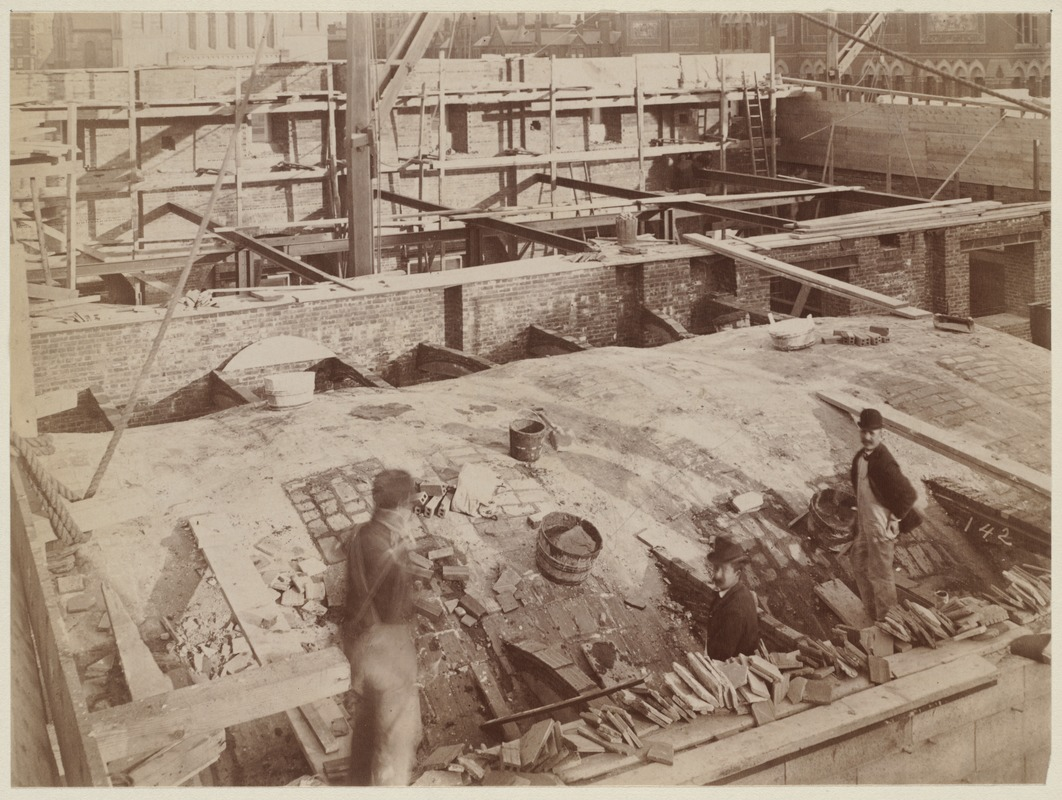
Workmen filling in tile vault domed ceilings

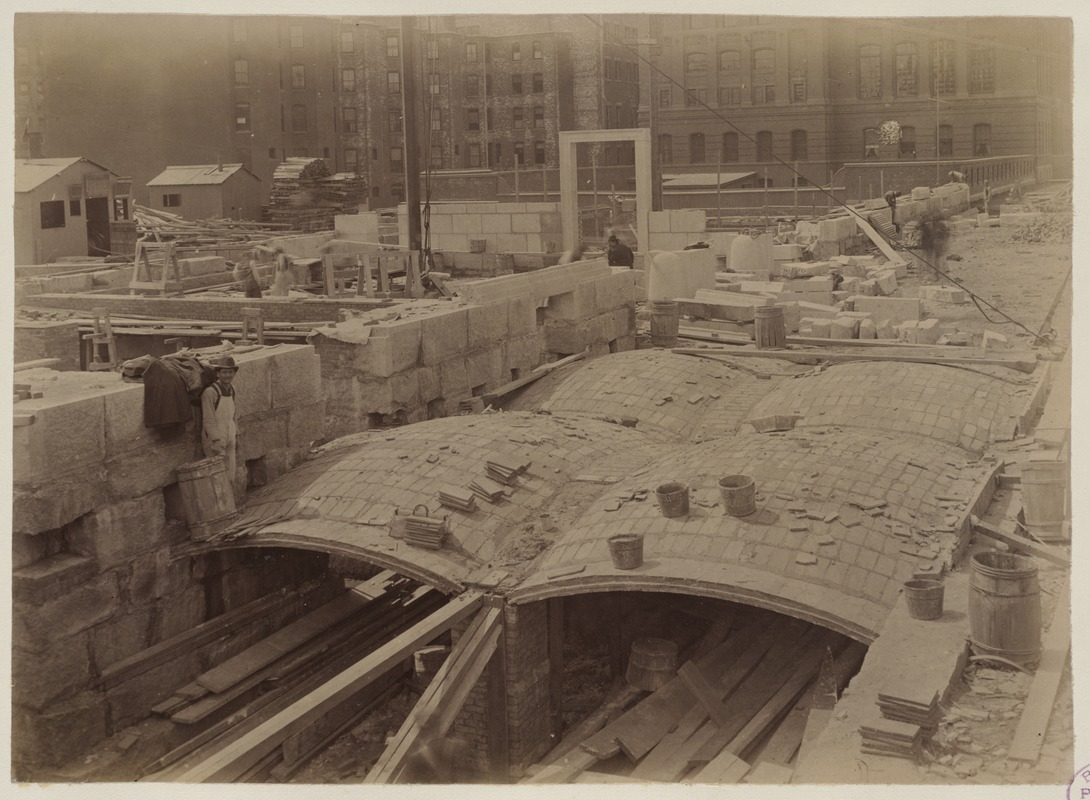
Four completed tile domes along Boylston Street

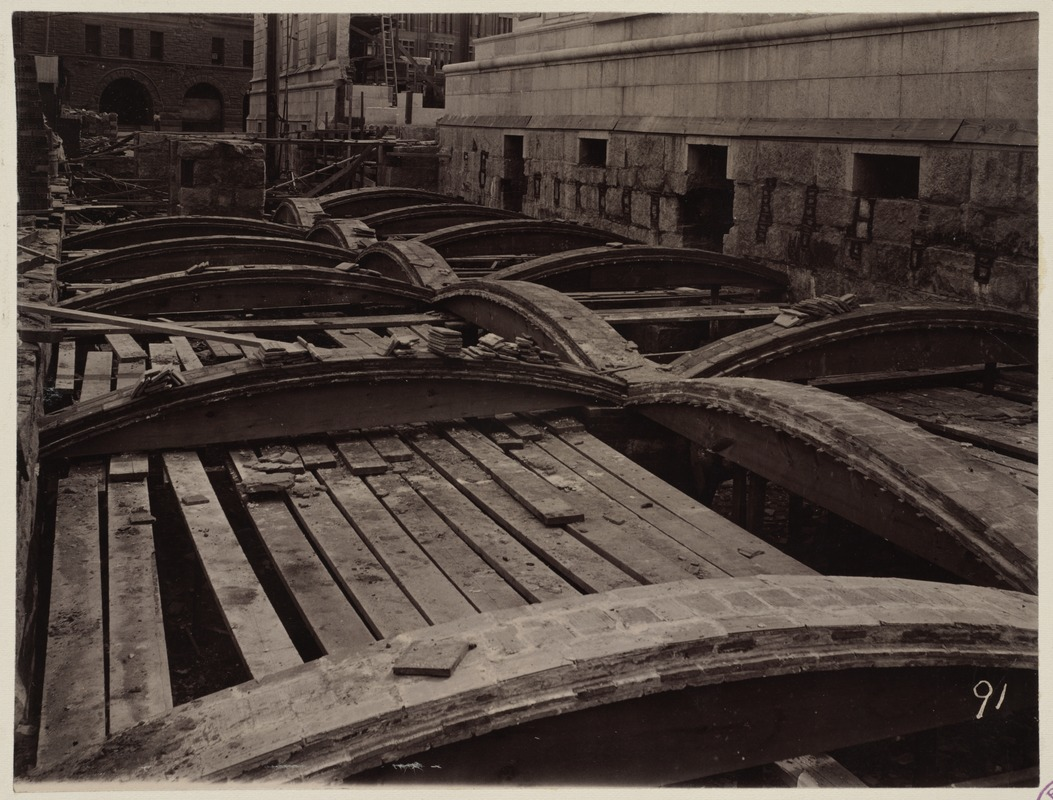
Tile arches along Dartmouth Street

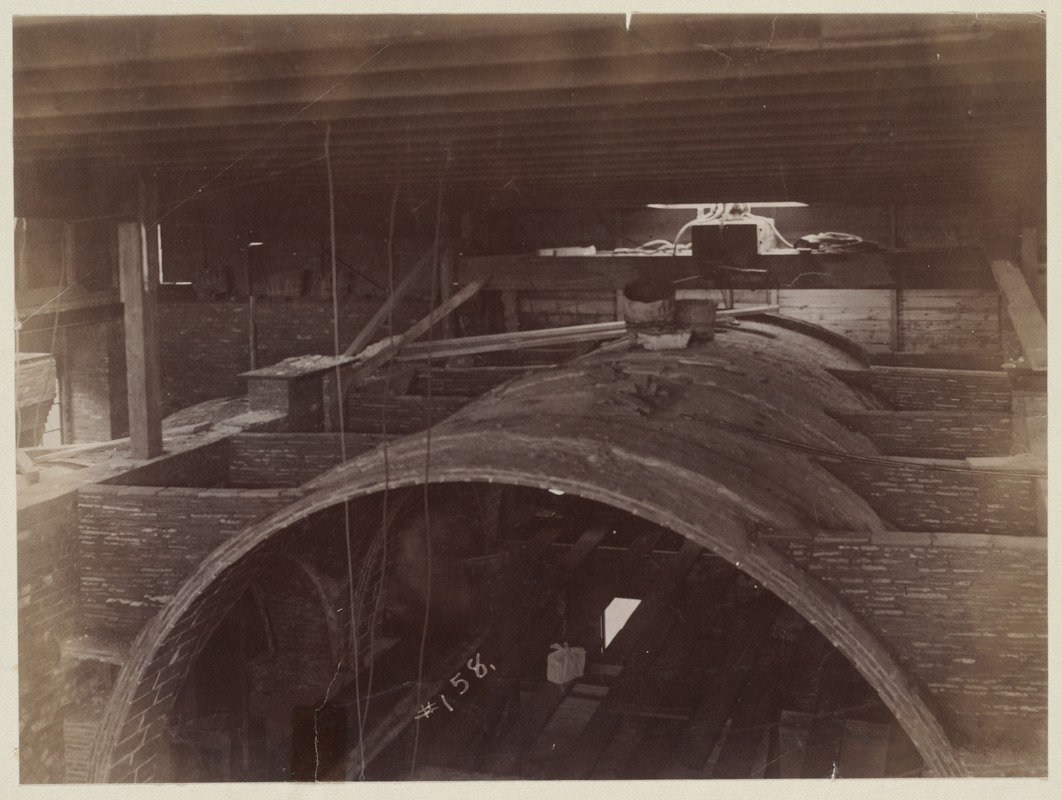
Tile arches and buttresses in entrance hall

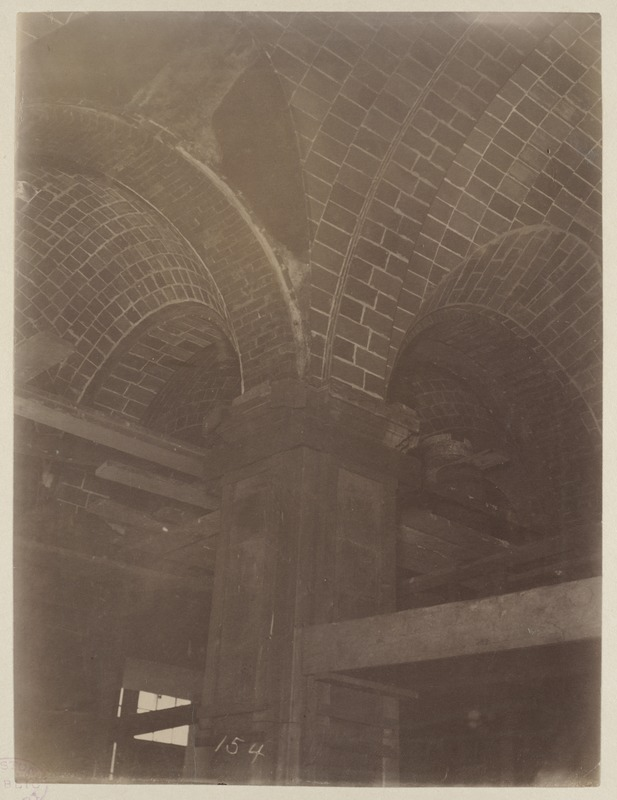
Closeup of completed tile arches and column in entrance hall

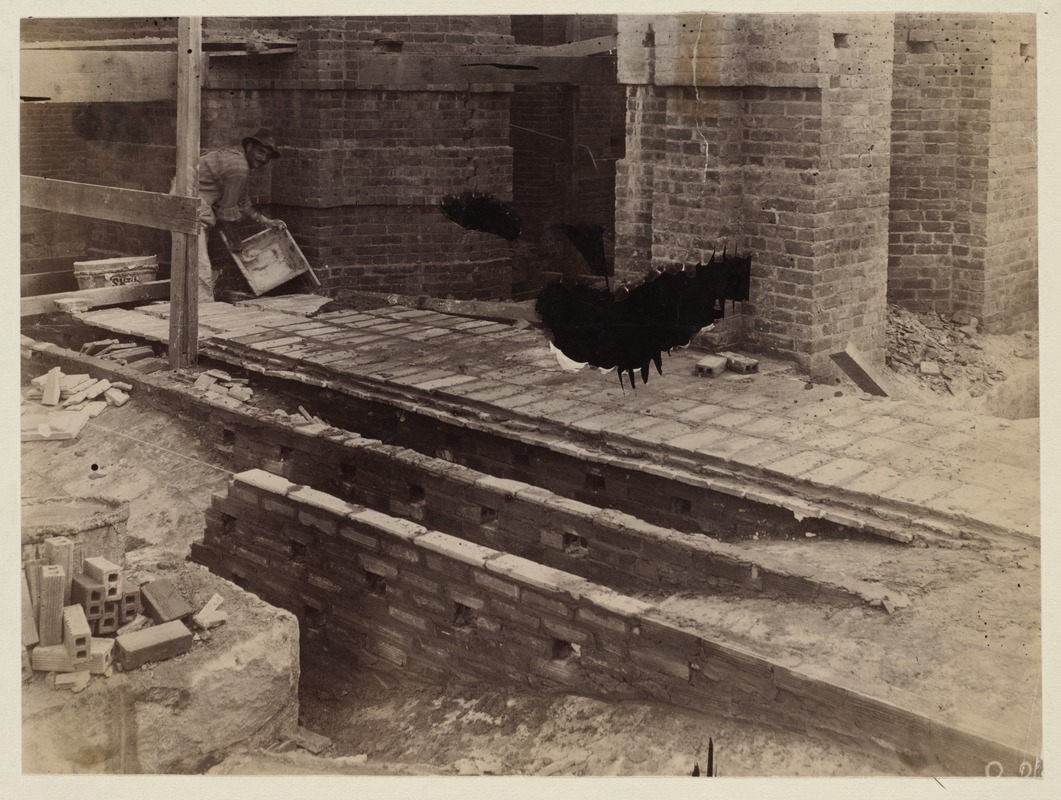
Guastavino tile vaults are strong enough to support the flooring above.

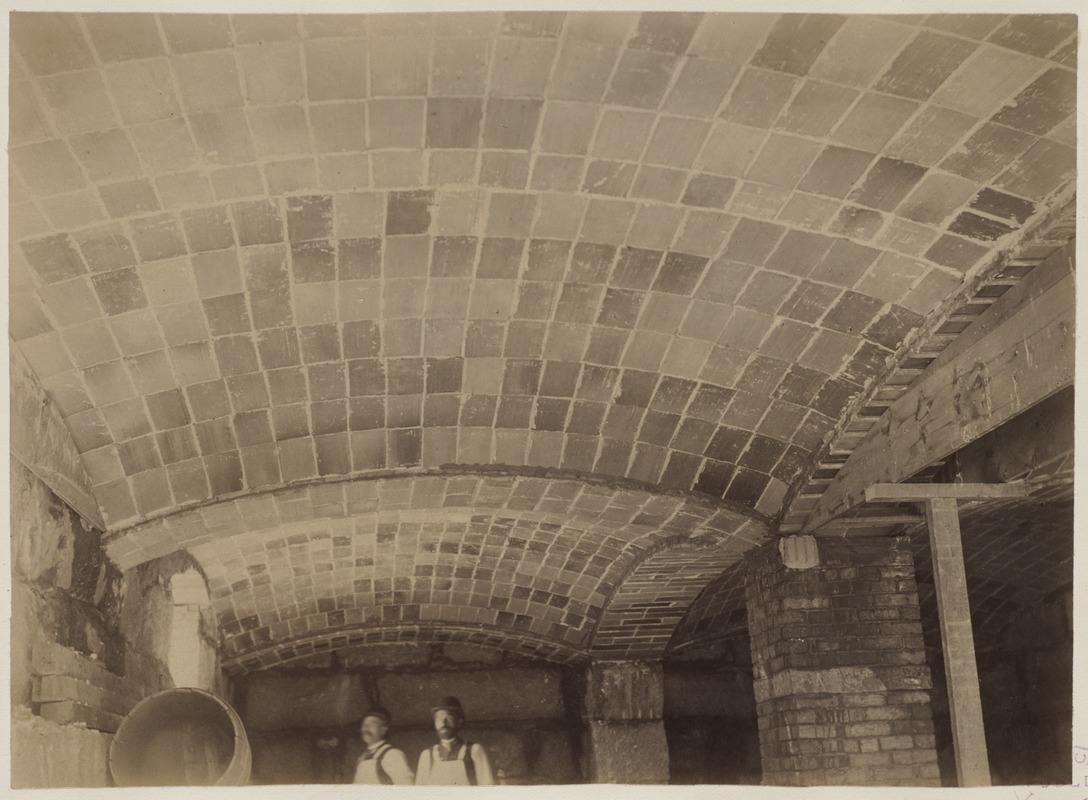
Completed tile domed ceiling in basement

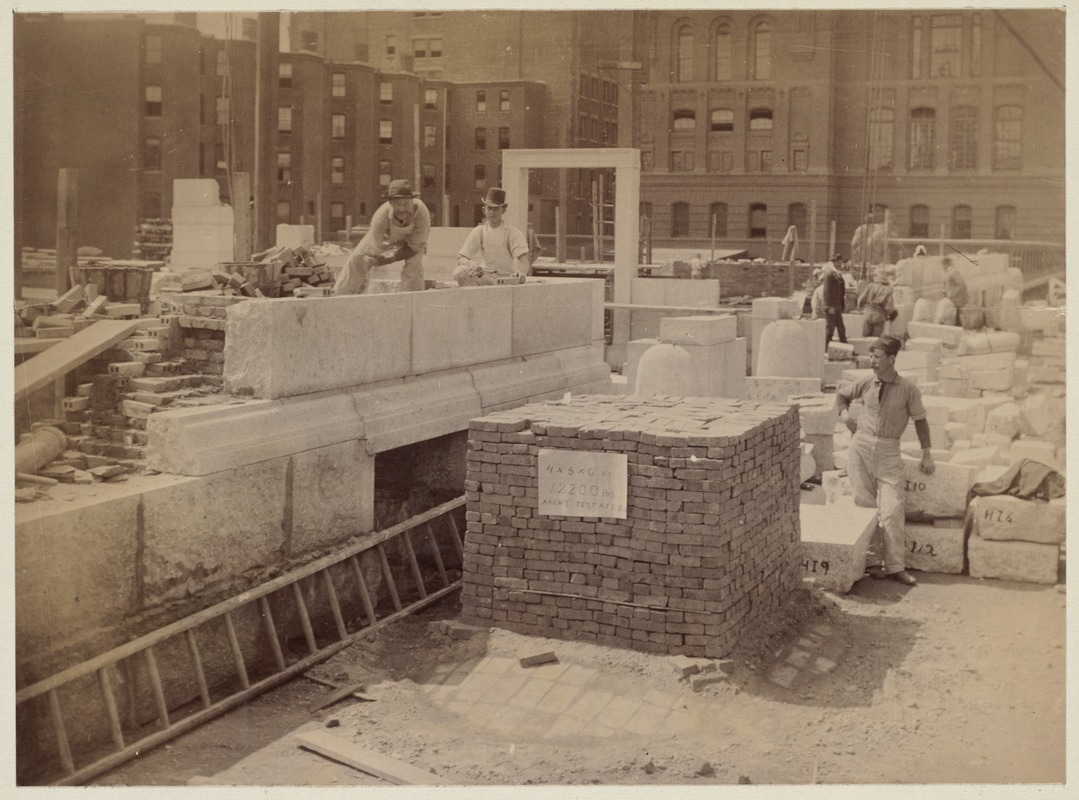
Load testing of tile arches

== Installations ==
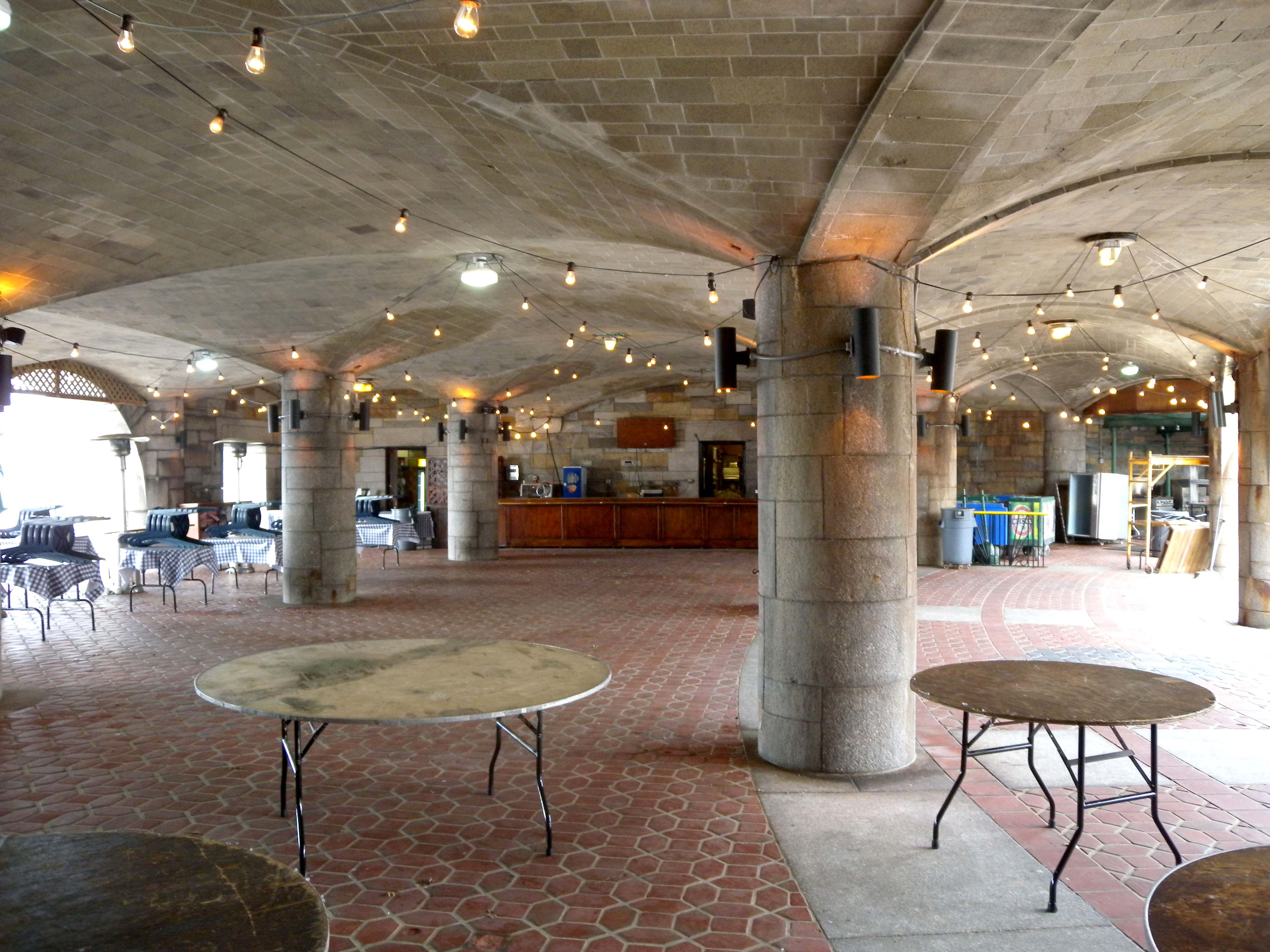
Cafe at 79th Street Rotunda in New York City

Guastavino tile is found in many prominent Beaux-Arts structures in the United States, particularly New York and Massachusetts. In New York City, these include the Oyster Bar and whispering gallery in Grand Central Terminal, the Manhattan Municipal Building, and the 79th Street Rotunda, among at least 100 others from the period that the Guastavino company operated. It is also found in some non-Beaux-Arts structures such as the crossing of the Cathedral of St. John the Divine.

In September 2012, the Boston Public Library (Rafael Guastavino's first major architectural work in the United States) hosted the Palaces for the People exhibition highlighting Guastavino installations and their legacy; an expanded version was later exhibited at the Museum of the City of New York in 2014.

== See also ==
- Akoustolith, a Guastavino company tile product
- Glazed architectural terra-cotta
- List of architectural vaults
- First Church of Christ, Scientist (Cambridge, Massachusetts)
- Ed Koch Queensboro Bridge
- Basilica of St. Lawrence, Asheville
- Biltmore Estate
- Grant's Tomb
- Grand Central Oyster Bar & Restaurant
