= Rafael Guastavino =

Builder and engineer (1842–1908)

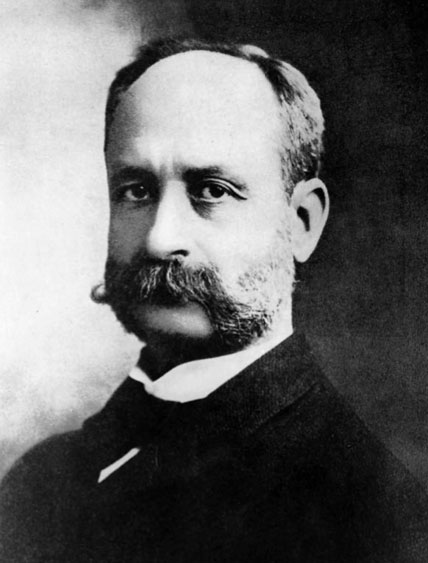
- Portrait of Rafael Guastavino
- Born: Rafael Guastavino Moreno; March 1, 1842; Valencia, Spain
- Died: February 1, 1908 (aged 65); Asheville, North Carolina, United States
- Resting place: Basilica of St. Lawrence, Asheville
- Relatives: Rafael Guastavino III (son)
- Engineering career
- Discipline: Architectural engineering
- Significant advance: Guastavino tile

Rafael Guastavino Moreno (Spanish pronunciation: [rafaˈel ɣwastaˈβino]; March 1, 1842 – February 1, 1908) was a Spanish building engineer and builder who immigrated to the United States in 1881; his career for the next three decades was based in New York City.

Based on the Catalan vault, he created the Guastavino tile, a "Tile Arch System", patented in the United States in 1885, which was used for constructing robust, self-supporting arches and architectural vaults using interlocking terracotta tiles and layers of mortar. His work appears in numerous prominent projects designed by major architectural firms in New York and other cities of the Northeast. Guastavino tile is found in some of New York's most prominent Beaux-Arts landmarks and in major buildings across the United States. It is also used in numerous architecturally important and famous buildings with vaulted spaces.

== Guastavino Fireproof Construction Company ==
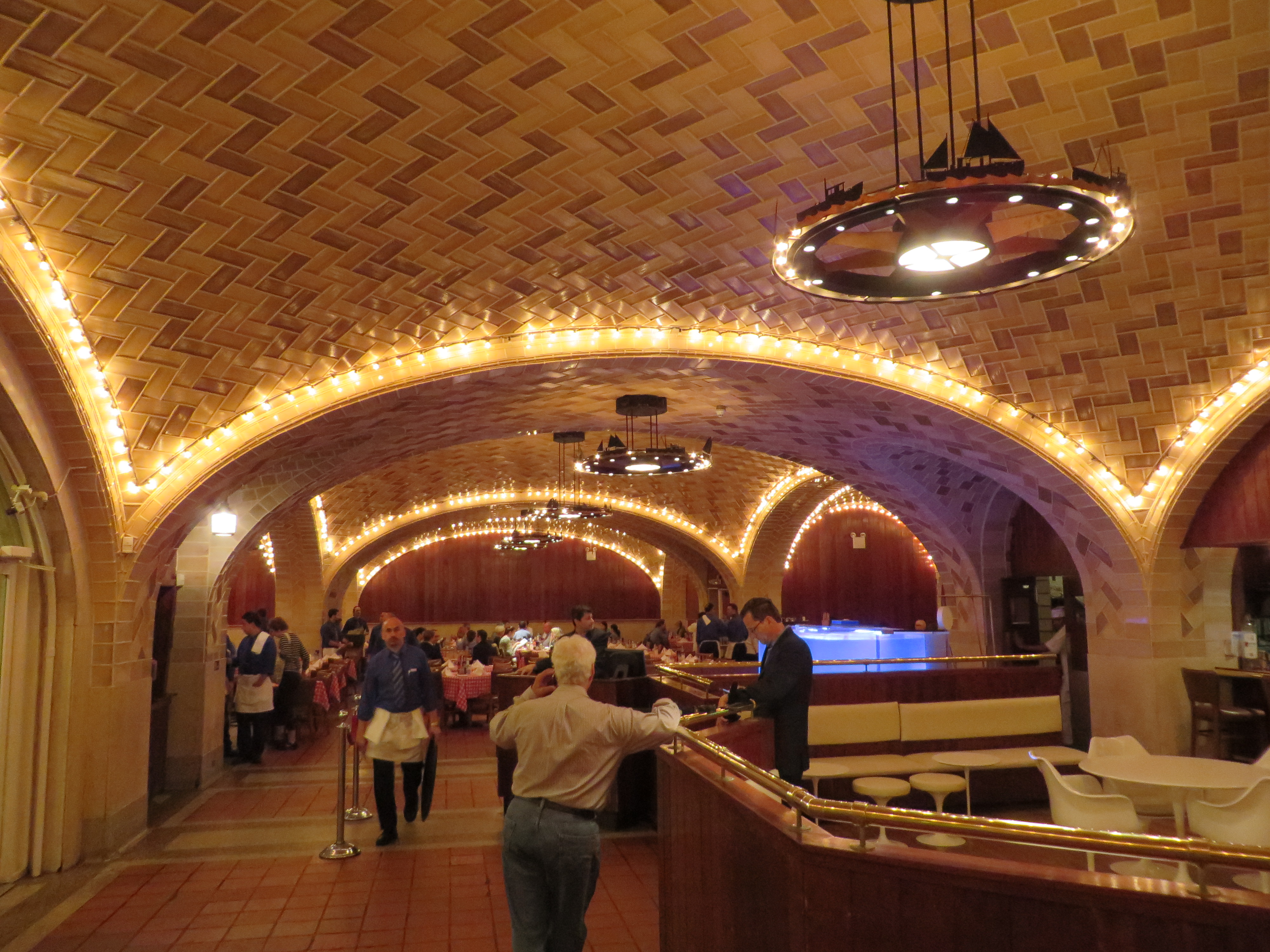
Guastavino tile vaulting at the Grand Central Oyster Bar & Restaurant

In 1881 Guastavino came to New York City from Valencia, with his youngest son, nine-year-old Rafael Jr. In Spain he had been an accomplished architect and was a contemporary of Antoni Gaudí. In the March 7, 1885 article entitled "The Dakota Apartment House", printed in The Real Estate Record and Builders Guide, Guastavino was identified as the contractor in charge of "fireproof construction" of the luxury apartment building, which was completed in 1884. Though not specified, the work may very well have included the groined vault entries on the south side on West 72nd Street, and the north side on West 73rd Street, as well as the construction of the subterranean basement, and the 3-foot thick arched floors between the basement and attic levels.

Guastavino was commissioned by the firm of McKim, Mead, and White for their Boston Central Library (1889), which increased his reputation with every major architect on the East Coast. His published drawings of interior decoration of the Spanish Renaissance style caught the eye of an architect, who asked him to submit a design for the planned New York Progress Club building. After forming a partnership with William Blodgett, Guastavino eventually was offered a construction position in 1890 with George W. Vanderbilt to construct arches for the new mansion, Biltmore Estate at Asheville, North Carolina.

After working on the estate, Guastavino decided to build his own retirement home in the mountains of Black Mountain, North Carolina in a 500-acre valley. His property, Rhododendron, also had a vineyard, dairy, brick kiln, and more. This property currently is owned by Christmount Assembly, the conference center for the Christian Church (Disciples of Christ). Guastavino's wife Francesca remained in the house until she died in 1946, and all that remains is a brick foundation and a wine cellar. The property holds artifacts that may be visited, including the kiln and chimney, a wine cellar, beautiful old stone walls, and many smaller structures that have been rediscovered as modern buildings have been constructed there.

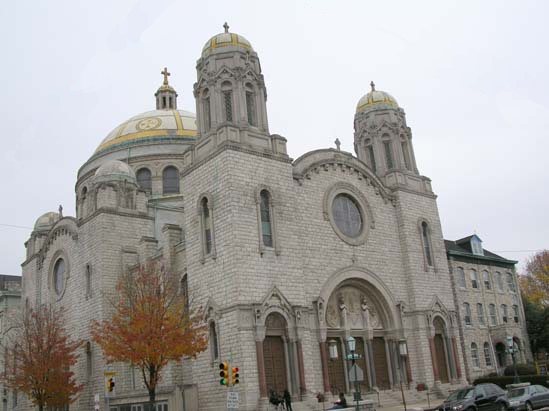
St. Francis de Sales Roman Catholic Church in Philadelphia

Guastavino and his son also developed twenty-four products that were awarded patents. Their company, Guastavino Fireproof Construction Company, run by the father and then by his son, was incorporated in 1889. It executed its final contract in 1962. Akoustolith was one of several trade names used by Guastavino.

Hundreds of major building projects incorporate the distinctive Tile Arch System. In Chicago, the central nave vaulting of Rockefeller Chapel at the University of Chicago uses 100,000 Guastavino tiles. In Boston, Guastavino tiles are found in the Boston Central Library; in New York City, in the Grand Central Terminal, Grant's Tomb, Carnegie Hall, the American Museum of Natural History, Congregation Emanu-El of New York, and St. Bartolomew's Episcopal Church; and in Washington, D.C. in the United States Supreme Court Building and the National Museum of Natural History on the National Mall. Guastavino tiles form the domes of Philadelphia's St. Francis de Sales Roman Catholic Church. At Pittsburgh's Union Station, the vaulting of the carriage turnaround is a Guastavino tile system. Wall and vault tiles are by Guastavino at the Buffalo Central Terminal. In Nebraska, the tiles may be seen in the Nebraska State Capitol.

=== Work in New York City ===
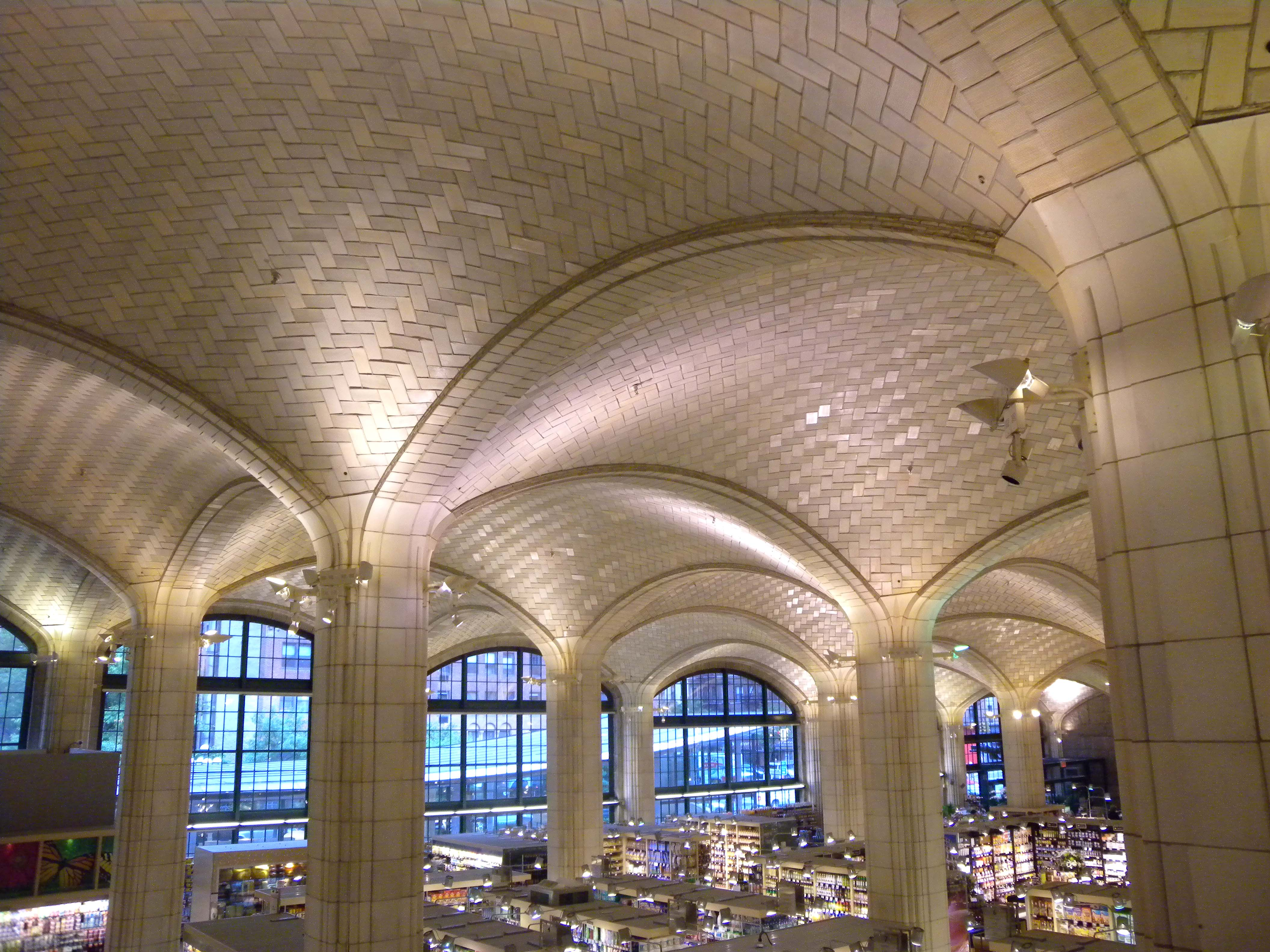
Bridgemarket, under Queensboro Bridge

In 1900, New York architects Heins & LaFarge hired Guastavino to help construct City Hall station, the underground showpiece for the IRT Main Line, the first part of the then-new New York City Subway. The station, although elegant, was never convenient or popular, as it was superseded by nearby stops with connections to Brooklyn. After the city closed it in 1945 because needed upgrades were too expensive, it became a legendary abandoned Manhattan underground relic. Subway buffs and urban spelunkers knew about it. Guastavino also installed the ceiling of the south arcade of the Manhattan Municipal Building, which was constructed during 1907-1914.

The Guastavinos had entered New York as immigrants via Ellis Island. In 1917 the younger Rafael Guastavino III was commissioned to rebuild the ceiling of the Ellis Island Great Hall. The Guastavinos set 28,258 tiles into a self-supporting interlocking 56-foot (17 m)-high ceiling grid so durable and strong that during the restoration project of the 1980s only seventeen of those tiles had to be replaced.

The largest dome created by the Guastavino Company was over the central crossing for the Cathedral of St. John the Divine in Manhattan: it is 100 ft (30 m) in diameter and 160 feet (49 m) high. This dome was intended to be a temporary structure, to be replaced by a high central tower. In 2009 this "temporary" fix celebrated the 100th anniversary of its construction. Guastavino received this contract due to the much lower price he could quote because his system served as its own scaffolding. This was an extreme test of his system, however. The masons had to work from above, each day adding a few rows of tiles, and standing on the previous day's work to make progress. At the edges, many layers of tile were laid, and the dome thins as it rises toward the center.

== As building engineer ==
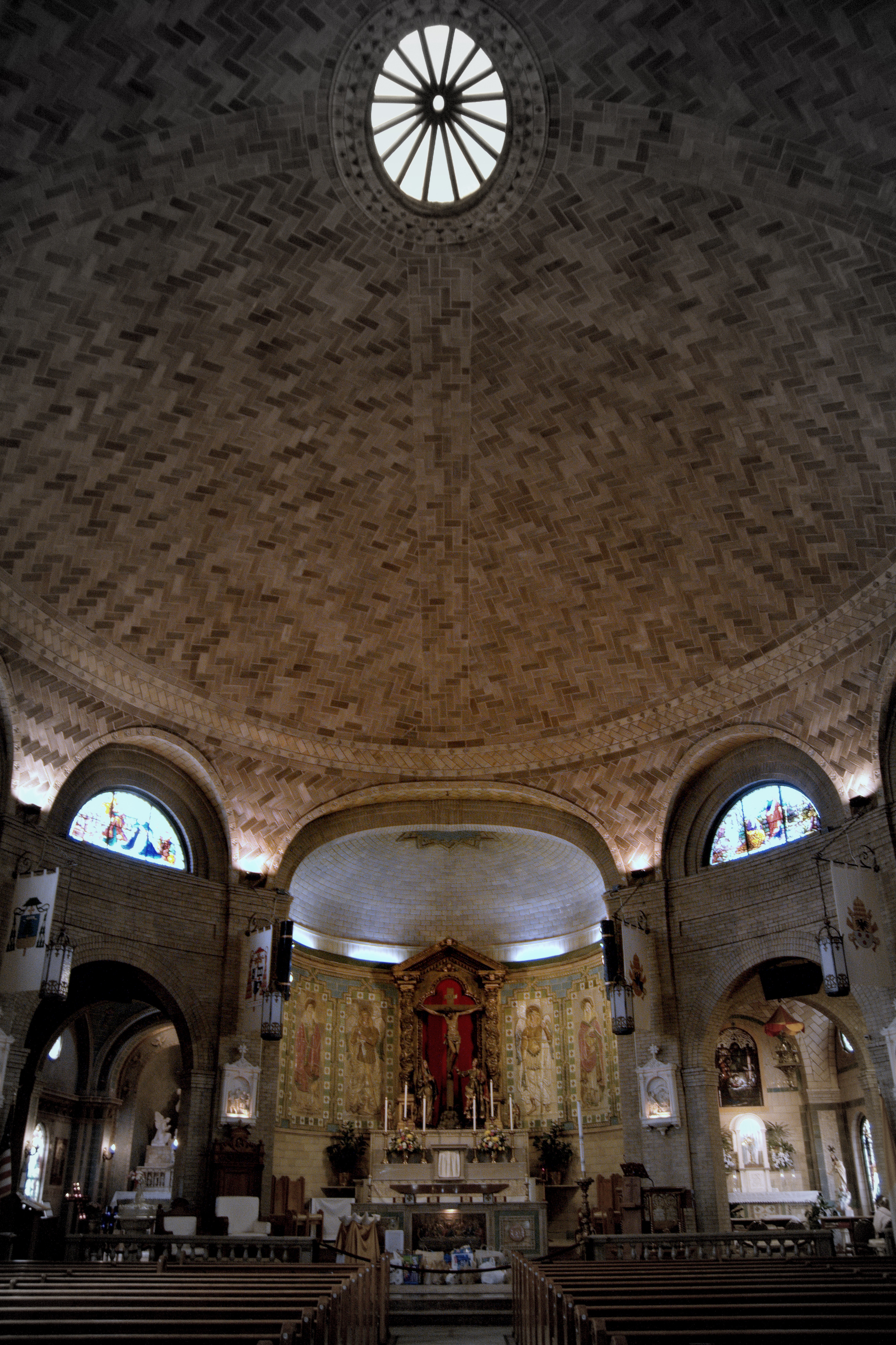
Inside dome of the Basilica of St. Lawrence, and final resting place of Rafael Guastavino in Asheville, North Carolina.

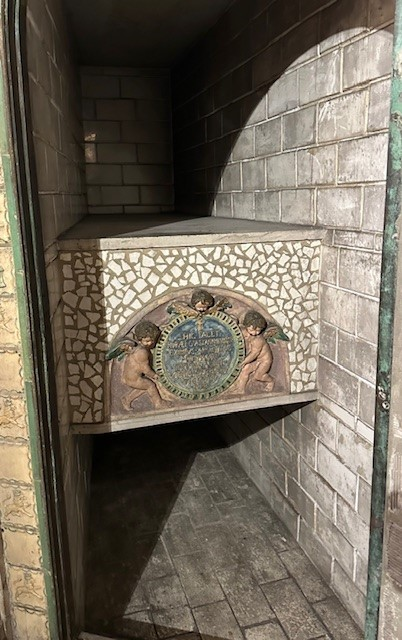
The crypt of Rafael Guastavino in the transept of the Basilica of St. Lawrence.

Few structures designed and built by Guastavino alone have been identified. He was responsible for a series of surviving rowhouses with unusual Moresque features on West 78th Street (121–131 known as the "red and whites"), on Manhattan's Upper West Side. Another of his structures, now used as an event space called Guastavino's, is located under the Midtown Manhattan end of the Queensboro Bridge. His son Rafael's Mediterranean villa (1912), built entirely of Guastavino tiles, still stands on Awixa Avenue, in Bay Shore, Long Island and was added to the National Register of Historic Places in 2013.

== Family ==
Guastavino lived with his aunt and uncle when he studied architecture in Barcelona, and he had a relationship with their adopted daughter Pilar. When he was 17 and she was 16, Pilar became pregnant, and the two married. They had three sons together, but Guastavino had an affair with nanny Paulina Roig, after which Pilar left her husband, later moving to Argentina. It is believed Paulina was the mother of Guastavino's fourth son Rafael Jr., and the three, along with the two previous daughters she had, moved to New York City together in 1881. However, Paulina and her two daughters returned to Spain that same year.

Guastavino began a relationship with Francesca Ramirez, who was much younger than he was, and he pretended Francesca was his daughter until they moved to North Carolina in the early 1890s. They married in 1894, when Guastavino was 51 and she was 33. At that time, he tried searching for his ex-wife and sons but had no luck.

== Retirement and legacy in North Carolina ==
After working on a commission at the Biltmore Estate, Guastavino retired to Black Mountain.

The site of his estate is now used as Christmount, the conference and retreat center of the Christian Church (Disciples of Christ). Ruins of the original Guastavino Estate still stand, and a collection of Guastavino memorabilia is held in the Christmount library. The Rafael Guastavino, Sr., Estate was listed on the National Register of Historic Places in 1989.

In North Carolina, Guastavino continued his work. He is buried in the crypt of the Basilica of St. Lawrence, Asheville, which he designed in 1905 as his final project. His son Rafael Jr., succeeded him at the helm of Guastavino Fireproof Construction Co. and used their signature vaulted tiling system in a number of notable projects in North Carolina, including Duke Chapel in Durham, the Jefferson Standard Building in Greensboro, the Morehead-Patterson Bell Tower in Chapel Hill, and Basilica Shrine of St. Mary in Wilmington.

== Archival sources ==
- The records and drawings of the Guastavino Fireproof Construction Company are held by the Department of Drawings & Archives in the Avery Architectural and Fine Arts Library at Columbia University in New York City.

== See also ==
- First Church of Christ, Scientist (Cambridge, Massachusetts)
