= First Church of Christ, Scientist (Cambridge, Massachusetts) =

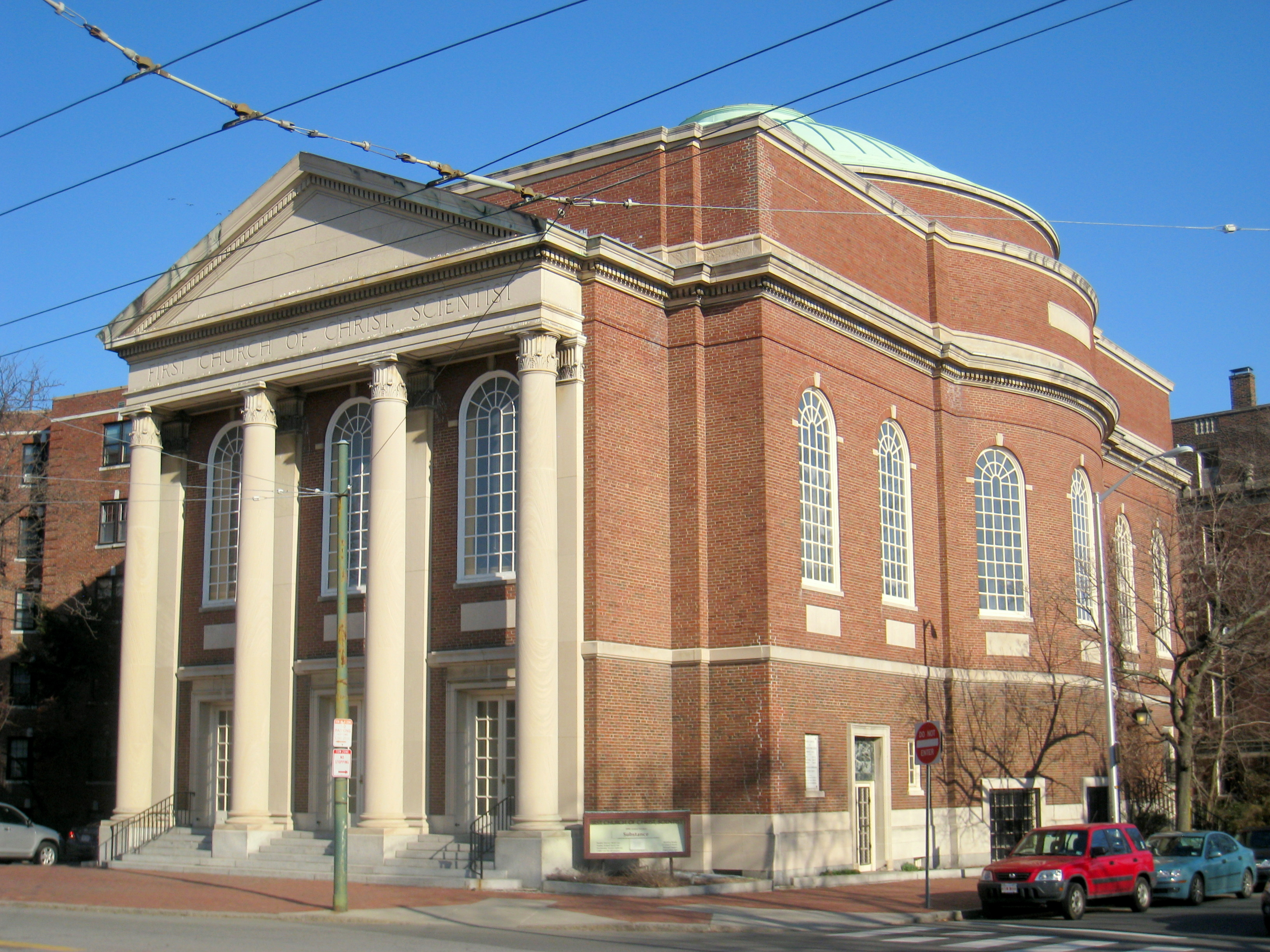
- The church in 2009
- First Church of Christ, Scientist
- 42°22′42″N 71°07′15″W
- Address: 13 Waterhouse Street; Cambridge, Massachusetts
- Country: United States
- Denomination: Christian Science
- Website: christiansciencecambridge.org

History
- Status: Parish church
- Dedicated: May 23, 1937

Architecture
- Functional status: Open
- Architect(s): Giles M. Smith; Bigelow and Wadsworth (later Bigelow, Wadsworth, Hubbard and Smith)
- Architectural type: Church; 6 storeys (incl. basement)
- Style: Classical Revival
- Years built: 1924–1930
- Completed: April 30, 1930

Specifications
- Materials: Red brick; copper-clad dome
- Building details

Height
- Roof: Single dome

Design and construction
- Engineer: Guastavino Fireproof Construction Company (dome)

First Church of Christ, Scientist is an historic redbrick 6-story domed Christian Science church building located at 13 Waterhouse Street, in Cambridge, Massachusetts.

== History ==
It was designed in 1917 by church member Giles M. Smith of the noted Boston architectural firm of Bigelow and Wadsworth (later Bigelow, Wadsworth, Hubbard and Smith), who patterned it after Thomas Jefferson's The Rotunda at the University of Virginia and the Pantheon in Rome. Due to cost constraints it was built in two phases between 1924 and 1930. The basement and ground floor levels topped by a belt course comprised the first phase, while the additional four stories and the massive dome comprised the second and final phase.

The dome was designed and built by the noted Guastavino Fireproof Construction Company, which in 1898 had done the reconstruction of the dome in The Rotunda at UVA and the construction in 1906 of the dome of the Mother Church Extension in Boston. Guastavino used its patented tile arch system consisting of Akoustolith, a porous ceramic material resembling stone, on the interior, with limestone on the exterior. The tile was manufactured at its plant in nearby Woburn. In 1933 copper flashing was added to the exterior of the dome in order correct a leakage problem. An oculus provided light to the interior.

The first services in the completed building were held on April 30, 1930, and after becoming debt free, it was dedicated on May 23, 1937.

First Church of Christ, Scientist is still located in the building, and is still an active branch of the Christian Science Mother Church.
