= Rafael Guastavino Sr. Estate =

Historic house in North Carolina, United States

- Rafael Guastavino, Sr., Estate
- U.S. National Register of Historic Places
- U.S. Historic district
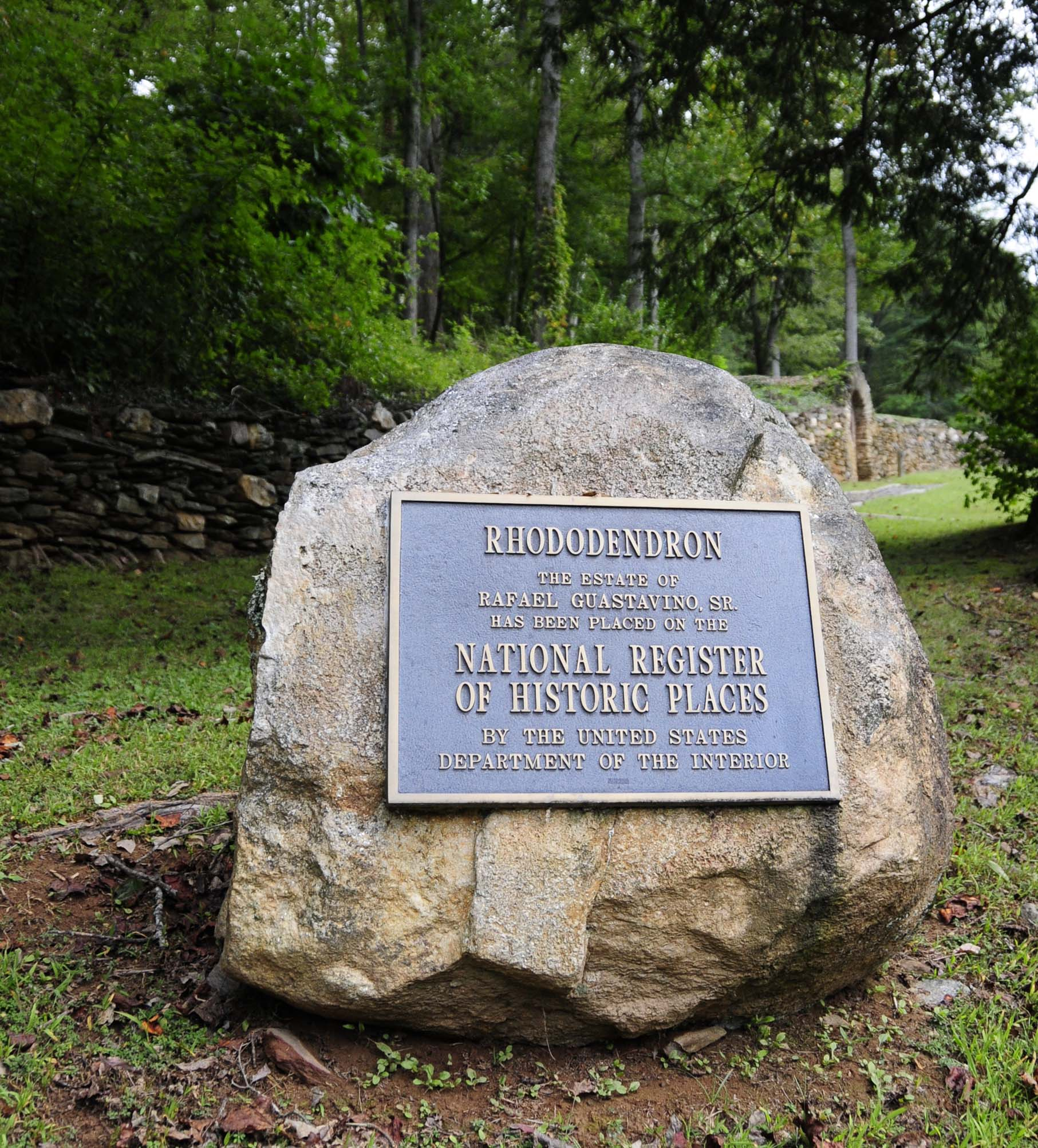
- Rafael Gustavino Monument, September 2012

- Location within North Carolina Location within the United States
- Location: NC 9, 0.8 miles S of jct. with SR 2713, near Black Mountain, North Carolina
- Coordinates: 35°35′51″N 82°18′35″W
- Area: 8 acres (3.2 ha)
- Built: 1895
- Built by: Guastavino, Rafael, Sr.
- NRHP reference No.: 89000849
- Added to NRHP: July 13, 1989

The Rafael Guastavino Sr. Estate, also known as Rhododendron, is a historic estate and a national historic district located near Black Mountain, Buncombe County, North Carolina. The district encompasses three contributing sites and three contributing structures associated with the former estate of the noted Spanish-born architectural engineer Rafael Guastavino. Although the house was razed in the late 1940s, the property includes above-ground ruins and landscaping, the ruins of Guastavino's tile kiln and its brick stack. Other contributing elements are a section of stone wall, a vaulted hillside cellar (traditionally known as the wine cellar), the exposed foundation ruins of the house, and earthworks. The estate was Guastavino's principal residence for the last 14 years of his life. The property is now Christmount, the conference and retreat center of the Christian Church (Disciples of Christ).

It was listed on the National Register of Historic Places in 1989.
