= Akoustolith =

Akoustolith is a porous ceramic material resembling stone. Akoustolith was a patented product of a collaboration between Rafael Guastavino Jr. (the son of Rafael Guastavino) and Harvard professor Wallace Sabine over years starting in 1911. It was used to limit acoustic reflection and noise in large vaulted ceilings. Akoustolith was bonded as an additional layer to the structural tile of the Tile Arch System ceilings built by the Rafael Guastavino Company of New Jersey. The most prevalent use was to aid speech intelligibility in cathedrals and churches before the widespread use of public address systems.

== History ==
Akoustolith was first introduced by the Guastavino Fireproof Construction Company, in collaboration with Wallace Sabine of Harvard University, in 1915. The founder of the Guastavino Company, Rafael Guastavino Sr., had immigrated to the United States from Spain in 1881, bringing with him the method of timbrel-vault construction, also known as cohesive construction. The Raphael Guastavino Company's vaulting technique created monolithic assemblies by layering thin bricks and structural tiles with fast-drying mortar. The Guastavino Technique, as it came to be known, consisted of multiple layers of plaster and tile in the construction of masonry vaulting; the first course of tile was set in its position with quick setting mortar creating form-work for the subsequent layers. Tiles were placed in concentric circles in the construction of domes, while in ribbed vaults, ribs served as the general form-work. Upon Guastavino Sr.'s death in 1908, his son, Rafael Guastavino Jr. took over the Guastavino Fireproof Construction Company; he was largely responsible for the company's development of acoustical finishes, including the incorporation and development of Rumford and Akoustolith tiles.

Raphael Guastavino Jr. and Wallace Sabine patented Akoustolith in 1916, to be used as a facing for Guastavino's timbrel vaults. The two had previously collaborated in the development of the Rumford tile, a ceramic acoustical finish used in the construction of the St. Thomas Church in New York City. While initially a success, the cost to manufacture Rumford tile led the company to focus on the development of the cheaper and more durable Akoustolith. As a non-ceramic tile, the sound absorption properties produced by Akoustolith's rough and porous surface, was an improvement on the Rumford tile . With the exception of the replacement of the first layer of tiles with the sound-absorbing Akoustolith, the Guastavino method of construction was unaltered. The effectiveness of Akoustolith in the reduction of reverberation led to its use in the construction of ecclesiastical spaces.

Following Sabine's death in 1919, Guastavino continued to patent acoustical building products. The Guastavino Fireproof Construction Company remained in business until 1962, its decline is attributed to the increased cost of hand labor in conjunction with the rise of concrete-shell construction. As timbrel-vault construction waned, the installation and production of acoustical materials helped sustain the company. By the late 1920s and early 1930s, a considerable portion of the firm's business was related to these products. However, as other corporations began to mass-produce less-expensive acoustical building materials, Guastavino products ceased to be competitive.

== Composition and properties ==
Akoustolith developed as an improvement on the earlier Rumford tile. Rumford tiles had previously been made with rich organic soil that burned off during the firing process and created pores, this procedure was ultimately irregular and difficult to control. Consequently, Akoustolith was produced by binding well-sorted pumice particles with Portland cement to create an artificial stone, a process which offered consistency and allowed for a variety of shapes and color. Although sand and Portland Cement were typically used in the production of Akoustolith, the tile patent states that crushed rock or brick could be used as the aggregate, while lime or Plaster of Paris could be used as the binding material.

Akoustolith's efficiency in absorbing different pitches was largely dependent upon the dimensions of its particles; its most imperative feature was its use of aggregate graded to a uniform size. Finer grades of aggregate were sieved out, leaving spaces between the particles, and creating an intercommunicating pore structure that absorbed sound. According to Guastavino's and Sabine's 1916 patent Akoustolith absorbed "much in excess of 15% of sounds in the pitch between the middle C and the third octave above the middle C, which are the characteristic sounds which distinguish articulate speech."

Designed with a graded porosity to increase their range of absorption, the stone-like finish of Akoustolith tiles consisted of a mix of coarser aggregate to facilitate the absorption of low pitches. Similarly, the bedding face consisted of a mix of finer aggregate to absorb higher pitches. Eventually, different grades of the material were sold; these varied in size and sound-absorption coefficients.

== Building with Akoustolith ==
Although the production of Akoustolith tile was short-lived, its effectiveness in reducing reverberation in ecclesiastical spaces led to its installation in a variety of building types, including commercial, industrial, and institutional structures. The acoustical and fireproof nature of Akoustolith was advertised, and to a lesser degree, its ability to resist the condensation of moisture. In addition, Akoustolith's aesthetic qualities were touted: the tiles were available in several shades of gray and buff intended to blend with the warm colors of adjacent stone.

Resembling a stone-like masonry material, Akoustolith tile was incorporated into several of the Guastavino Company's major building projects, including the 1929 construction of the Buffalo Central Terminal. Completed in the late 1920s, Fellheimer & Wagner's Buffalo Central Terminal was the largest installation of Akoustolith completed by the Guastavino Company.

== Example projects ==
Fellheimer & Wagner's design of the Buffalo Central Terminal, in New York, was the largest installation of the Akoustolith completed by the Guastavino Company.

New York architect Bertram Goodhue specified the use of the Guastavino tile in his 1920 design for the Nebraska Capitol. Consequently, the Nebraska Capitol features tiled vaults and domes, and meeting rooms constructed with Akoustolith tiles.

Ralph Adams Cram's 1921 design for the Princeton University Chapel employs the Guastavino Company's Akoustolith tile vaulting.
