= Grand Central Oyster Bar & Restaurant =

Restaurant in New York City

Coordinates: 40°45′8.4″N 73°58′38″W

Oyster Bar

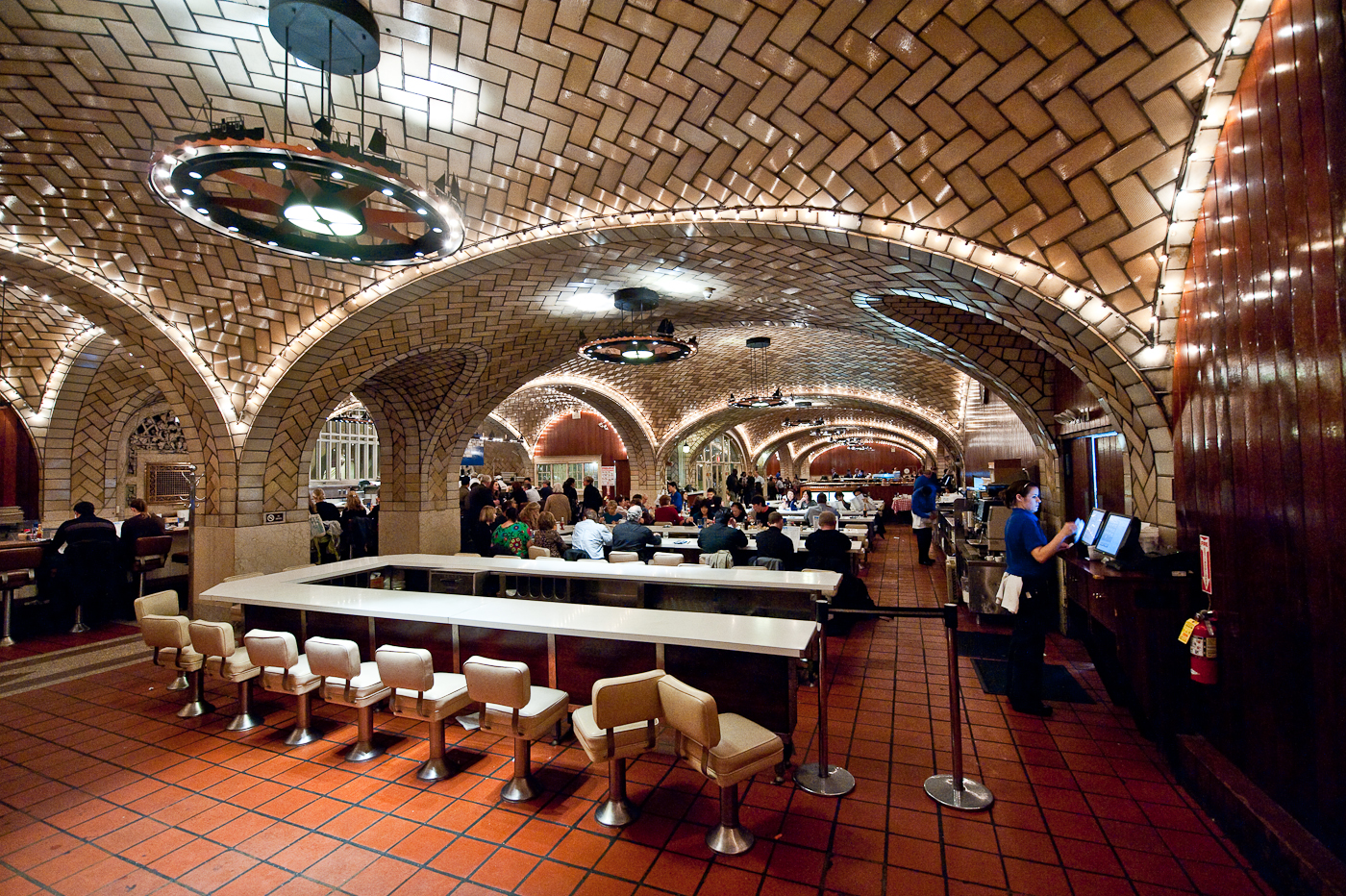
- Interactive map of Oyster Bar

Restaurant information
- Established: 1913
- Food type: Seafood
- Dress code: Casual
- Location: Lower Level, Grand Central Terminal, 89 East 42nd Street, New York, NY 10017
- Reservations: Yes
- Other locations: Tokyo
- Website: oysterbarny.com

The Grand Central Oyster Bar & Restaurant is a seafood restaurant on the lower level of Grand Central Terminal at 42nd Street and Park Avenue in Manhattan, New York City.

== History ==
The restaurant space was first opened as the Grand Central Terminal Restaurant. Although Grand Central Terminal opened on February 2, 1913, its opening was celebrated one day prior, February 1, with a dinner at the restaurant, arranged for Warren and Wetmore along with 100 guests.

The restaurant was operated by The Union News Company. It closed briefly for renovations following a 1997 fire.

Jerome Brody sold the Oyster Bar to employees in 1999, and died in 2001. Brody chose to sell to staff to preserve the union and employee satisfaction in his transition. As of 2017, all non-union, managerial staff are part of the Employee Stock Ownership Program (ESOP). The initial group of managers bought a near-majority of the company's stock with a loan between 1999 and 2001. They purchased the remainder between 2004 and 2008. Staff at the Oyster Bar are represented by UNITE HERE Local 100.

In 2016, the Zagat Survey gave it a food rating of 22/30, "Very Good To Excellent".

The Oyster Bar closed for a majority of 2020 during the COVID-19 pandemic. It briefly reopened for two weeks and closed again when its underground location failed to attract foot traffic. It then resumed its activities back to normal business from 2021 on.

== Architecture ==
Its architecture features the vaulted, Guastavino tiled ceilings common in the era of its construction. The archway in front of the restaurant is also famous for an acoustical quirk making it a whispering gallery by which someone standing in one corner can hear someone standing in the opposite corner perfectly no matter how softly they speak.

== Branches ==
Two Japanese branches have opened in Tokyo. The first, the GCOBR Shinagawa, is located on the 4th floor of Atre Shinagawa in the Shinagawa Station. The second, GCOBR Marunouchi, is located in Marunouchi MY PLAZA near Tokyo Station. A small branch was located in Terminal C at Newark Liberty International Airport, but closed in about 2021.

== Gallery ==
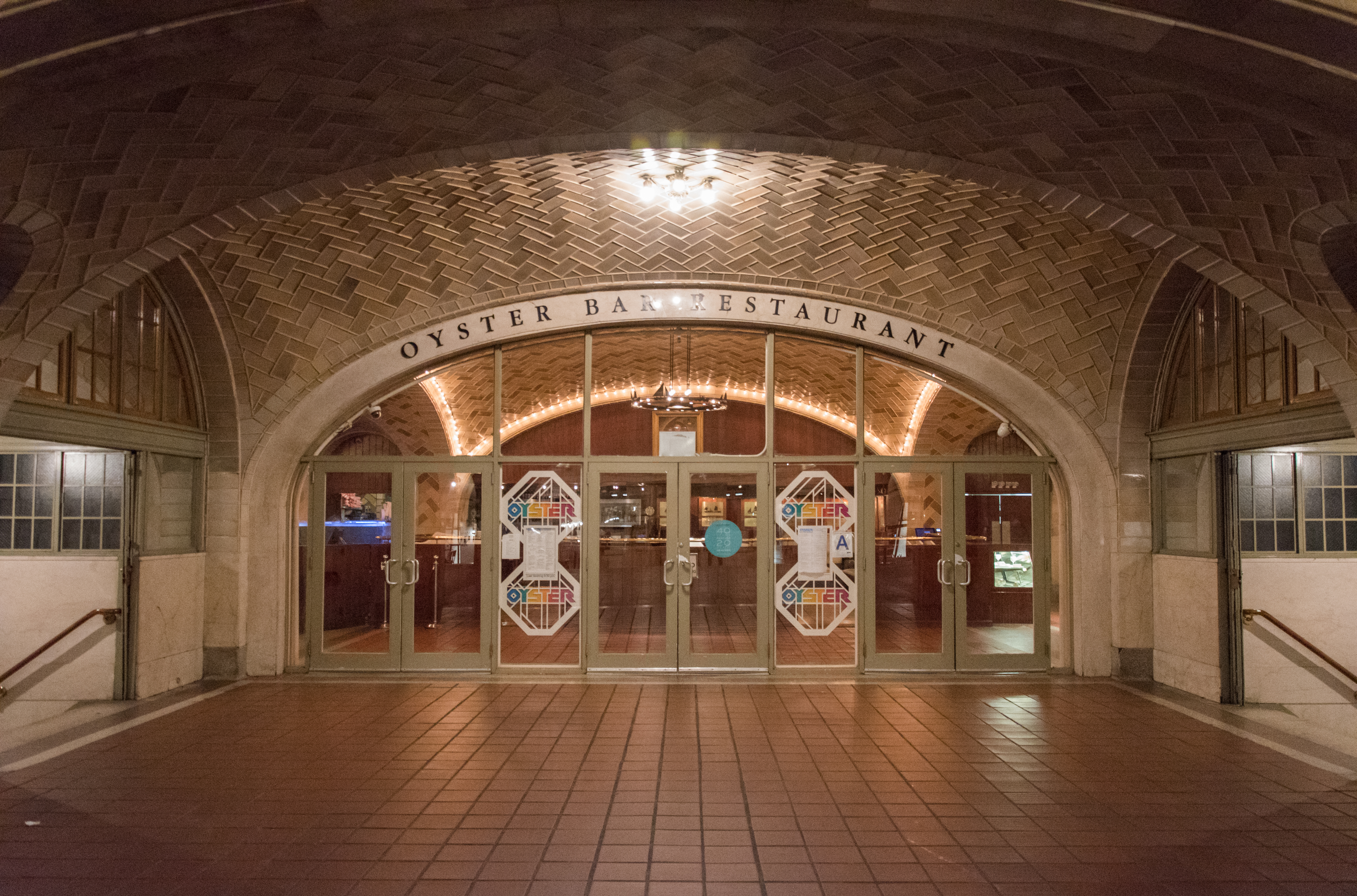
Main entrance

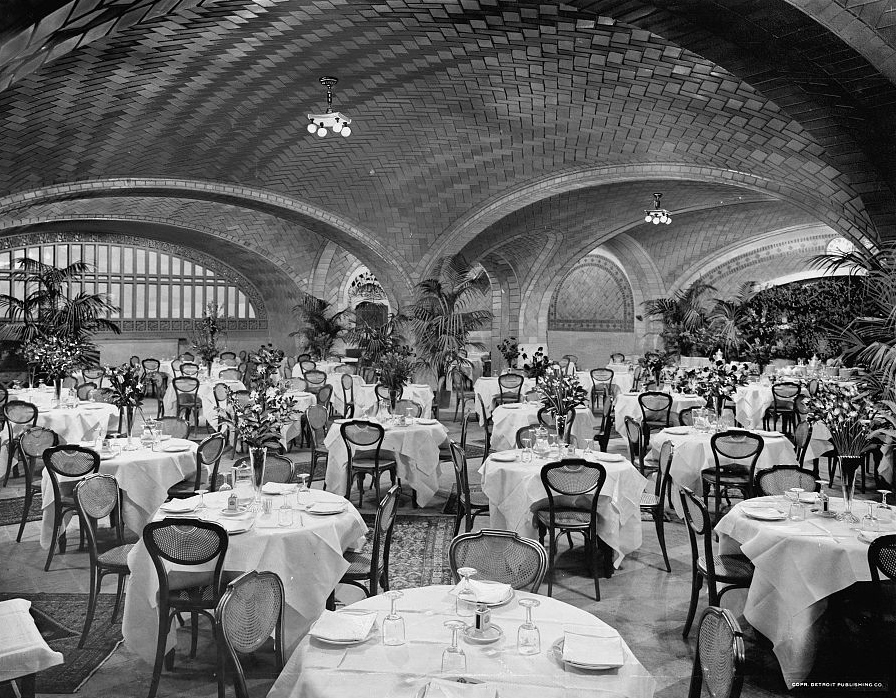
Original decor

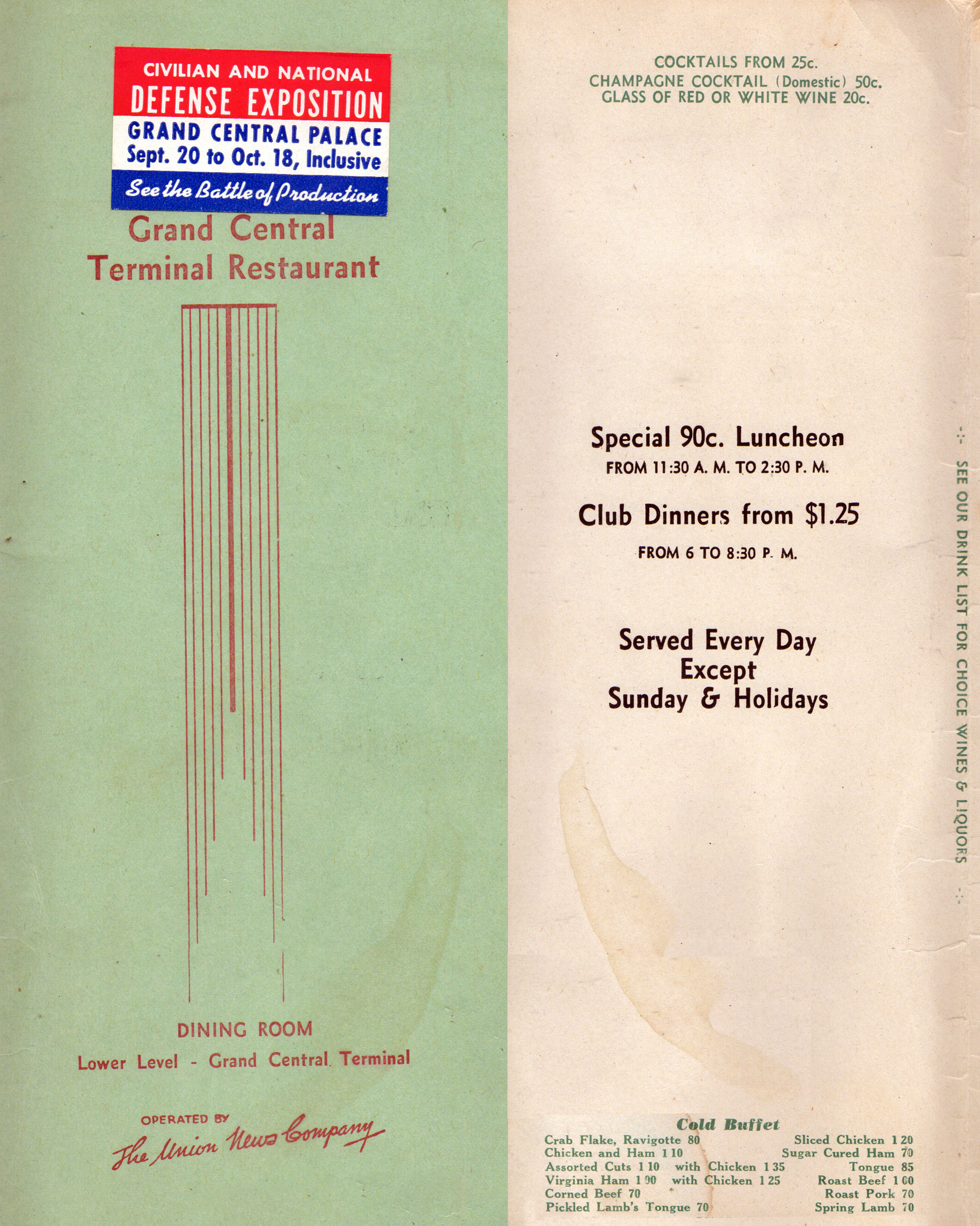
Menu (1941)

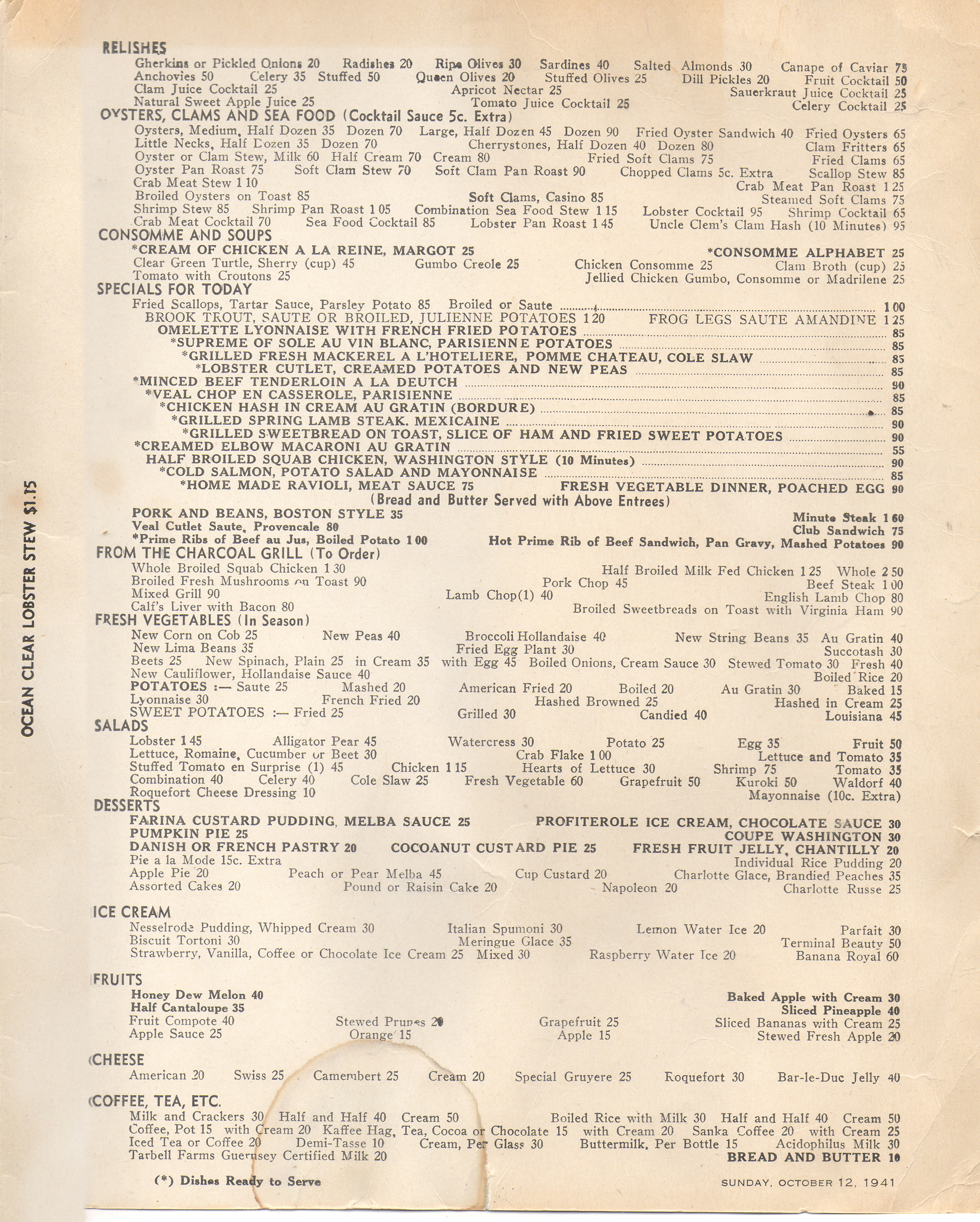
Menu (1941)

== See also ==
- List of oyster bars
- List of restaurants in New York City
- List of seafood restaurants
- Ratskeller
