= Catalan vault =

Low brickwork arch

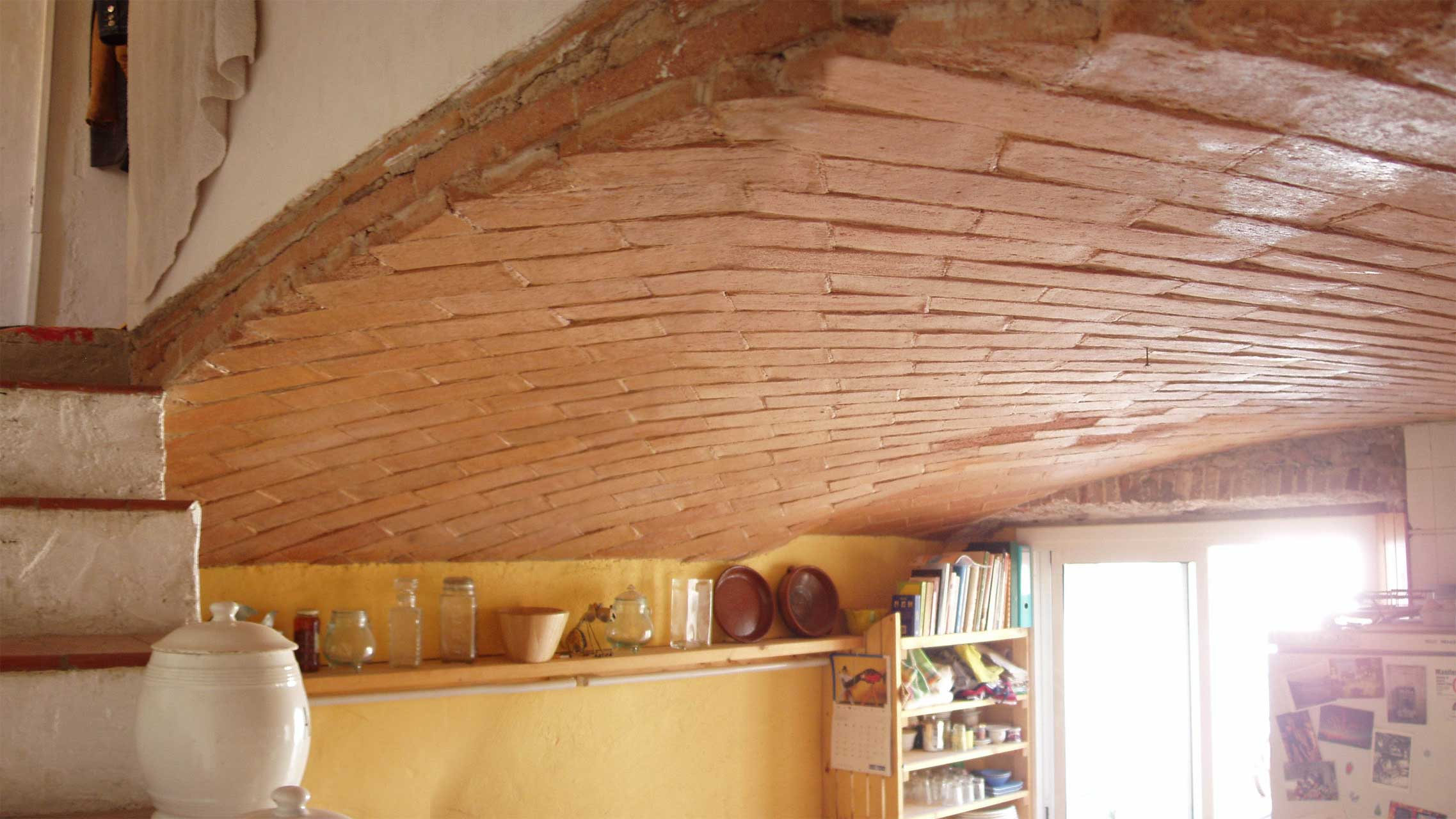
A Catalan vault in a house in Barcelona

The Catalan vault (Catalan: volta catalana), also called thin-tile vault, Catalan turn, Catalan arch, boveda ceiling (Spanish bóveda 'vault'), timbrel vault or timbrel arch, is a type of low brickwork arch forming a vaulted ceiling that often supports a floor above. It is constructed by laying a first layer of light bricks lengthwise "in space", without centering or formwork, and has a much gentler curve than most other methods of construction.

== Structural technique ==
Whereas the Romans had mastered the technique of building vaults in brick, they did not structure their vaults in the same way. In Catalonia, the Valencian Land and neighboring areas, the Catalan vault technique was developed and flourished as a traditional form, and has spread around the world in more recent times through the work of Catalan architects such as Antoni Gaudí and Josep Puig i Cadafalch, and the Valencian architect Rafael Guastavino.

As Block & Rippmann explain, "constructing vaults in brick was mastered by the Romans, but it evolved as time passed. The Catalan vaulting technique in particular made it possible to build spectacular structures [...]. In many respects, Catalan vaulting is in the lineage of the common brick vault of Roman times, but the bricks are not laid, as they had typically been, in an upright position, but employed flat, usually in three layers."

A study on the stability of the Catalan vault is kept at the archive of the Institute of Catalan Studies, where it is said to have been entrusted by Josep Puig i Cadafalch.

Though it is popularly called the Catalan vault, this construction method is found throughout the Mediterranean and the invention of the term "Catalan vault" occurred in 1904 at an architectural congress in Madrid.

The technique was brought to New Spain (colonial Mexico), and is still used in parts of contemporary Mexico.

== In the United States ==
Valencian architect and builder Rafael Guastavino introduced the technique to the United States in the 1880s, where it is called Guastavino tile. It is used in many major buildings across the United States, including the Boston Central Library, the New York Grand Central Terminal, and many others.

== See also ==
- Illusionistic ceiling painting
- List of architectural vaults
