= Rafael Guastavino III =

Spanish-American builder and engineer

- Born: Rafael Guastavino Expósito; May 12, 1872; Barcelona, Spain
- Died: October 19, 1950 (aged 78); Bay Shore, New York, U.S.
- Resting place: St. Patrick Cemetery, Bay Shore, New York, U.S.
- Spouse: Elsie S. Mann
- Father: Rafael Guastavino
- Engineering career
- Discipline: Architectural engineering

Rafael Guastavino Expósito (May 12, 1872 – October 19, 1950) was a Spanish architect. He was the son of fellow architect Rafael Guastavino (1842–1908).

== Early life ==
Guastavino was born in Barcelona, Spain, in 1872, to Rafael Guastavino Sr. (1842–1908) and Paulina Roig. He was the third Rafael Guastavino, after his father and paternal grandfather, Rafael Guastavino Buch (1817–1875). Guastavino Sr. and his eight-year-old son arrived in New York City in 1881. The elder Guastavino had separated from his wife after he began an affair with the family's nanny, Francesca Ramirez, who traveled with them to the United States.

== Career ==
Guastavino Jr. was an apprentice to his father and mastered the art of tile vaulting. While Guastavino Jr. was working on the Biltmore Estate in the early 1890s, the family lived on Black Mountain, on an estate known as Rhododendron. By 1895, the younger Guastavino was gaining more of a role in the Guastavino Fire Proof Construction Company.

Guastavino Sr. died in 1908 and was interred in a vault in the Basilica of St. Lawrence in Asheville, North Carolina, which he helped design alongside Richard Sharp Smith. It was completed the following year by Guastavino Jr., who was also working on projects in New York City (Cathedral of St. John the Divine), Boston (Boston Public Library), Pittsburgh and Baltimore.

One of his most noted works was the Basilica Shrine of St. Mary in Wilmington, North Carolina, while he was also responsible for the Maxwell B. Chambers Memorial Building at Davidson College, Duke Chapel in Durham, the Centenary United Methodist Church in Winston-Salem and the Morehead–Patterson Bell Tower at the University of North Carolina at Chapel Hill.

== Personal life ==
Guastavino married Elsie S. Mann, with whom he had two known children: Rafael Guastavino IV and Louise Gulden.

== Death ==
Guastavino died in Bay Shore, New York, in 1950, four years after the death of his stepmother. He was interred in St. Patrick Cemetery. His daughter was also buried there upon her death in 2004.
