= Jean-Marie Guastavino =

French politician (1886–1960)

Jean-Marie Guastavino (1 April 1886 - 26 August 1960) was a French politician.

Guastavino was born in Algiers, Algeria. He represented the Independent Radicals (from 1932 to 1936) and the Radical Party (from 1936 to 1940) in the Chamber of Deputies.
