= Basilica of St. Lawrence (Asheville, North Carolina) =

Catholic minor basilica in Asheville, North Carolina

The Minor Basilica of Saint Lawrence
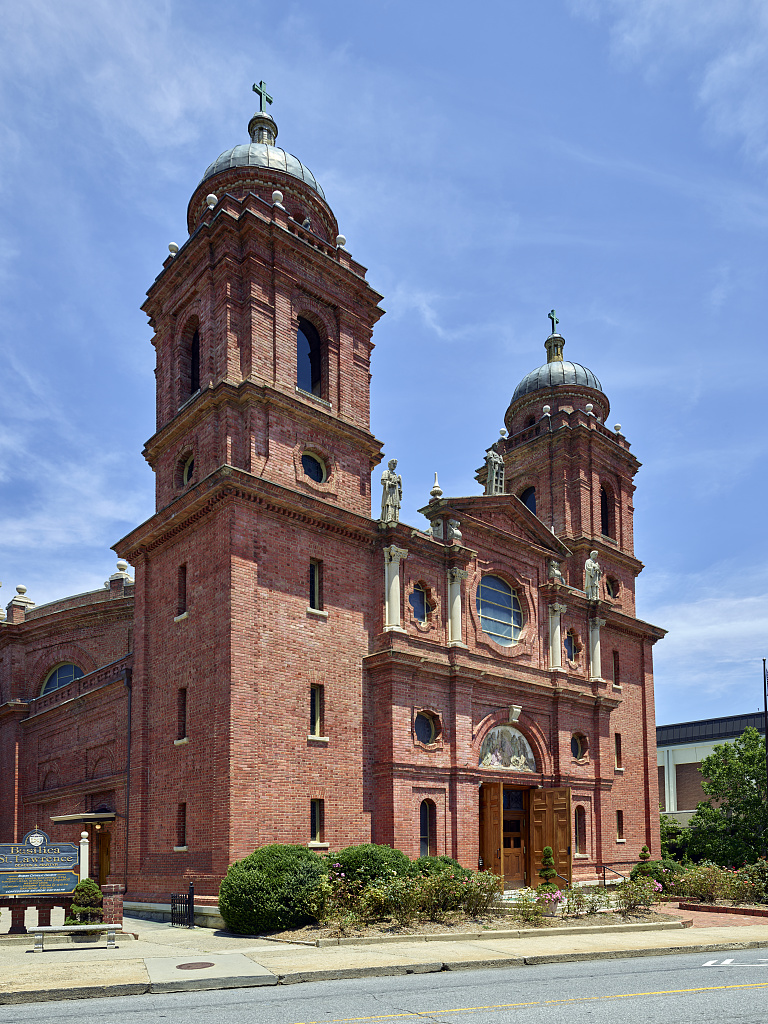
- Principal Facade, Basilica of St. Lawrence

Religion
- Affiliation: Catholic Church
- Diocese: Diocese of Charlotte
- Leadership: Rev. Msgr. Roger Arnsparger, Rector
- Status: Minor Basilica

Location
- Location: Asheville, North Carolina, United States
- State: North Carolina

Architecture
- Architects: Rafael Guastavino; Richard Sharp Smith
- Style: Spanish Renaissance architecture
- Completed: 1909

Website
- www.saintlawrencebasilica.org
- Church of St. Lawrence
- U.S. National Register of Historic Places
- Location within North Carolina
- Location: 97 Haywood St., Asheville, North Carolina
- Coordinates: 35°35′51″N 82°33′23″W
- Area: 1 acre (0.40 ha)
- Built: 1905
- NRHP reference No.: 78001933
- Added to NRHP: March 24, 1978

The Minor Basilica of St. Lawrence the Deacon & Martyr is a minor basilica of the Catholic Church in downtown Asheville, North Carolina, United States. The church was designed and built in 1905 by Spanish architect Rafael Guastavino (who is interred there) along with his fellow architect R. S. Smith and the Catholic community of Asheville. Pope John Paul II elevated the status of the church to minor basilica in 1993. It is a parish church, located within the Diocese of Charlotte. It is on the National Register of Historic Places and is the only basilica in western North Carolina. Its dome, inspired by the Royal Basilica of Our Lady of the Forsaken of Valencia, has a span of 58 by 82 feet (18 by 25 m), and is reputed to be the largest, freestanding, elliptical dome in North America. The architectural style is Spanish Renaissance Revival.

It is located in the Downtown Asheville Historic District.

== Interior ==
The inside of the basilica is adorned with statues of saints, including St. Lawrence, St. Cecilia, St. Rose of Lima, St. Patrick, and St. Peter the Apostle. The Daprato Statue Company made the statues in Italy. The high altar is made from Tennessee marble. Above the high altar in the sanctuary is a Spanish wood carving of the Virgin Mary and John the Apostle mourning at the crucifixion of Christ. Behind the wood carving of the crucifixion and covering the entire wall of the apse are polychrome, terra cotta, ornamental partitions of the Four Evangelists and Archangels St. Raphael and St. Michael.

=== Stained glass windows ===
The basilica is known for its many elaborate stained glass windows, many of which were made in Munich, Germany. On the right wall of the basilica, the windows depict the Annunciation of the Blessed Virgin Mary, the Visitation of the Blessed Virgin Mary, the Nativity of Christ, the Child Christ Teaching in the Temple, and the Conversion of Saint Paul. On the left wall the windows depict the Wedding at Cana, Christ Healing the Daughter of Jairus, the Calming of the Wind and Waves, the Agony in the Garden, and the Resurrected Christ appearing to St. Mary Magdalene. The two large windows, one on the eastern wall and one on the western wall, represent Christ healing the afflicted and the Transfiguration of Christ. The large window in the organ loft portrays the Resurrection of Christ.

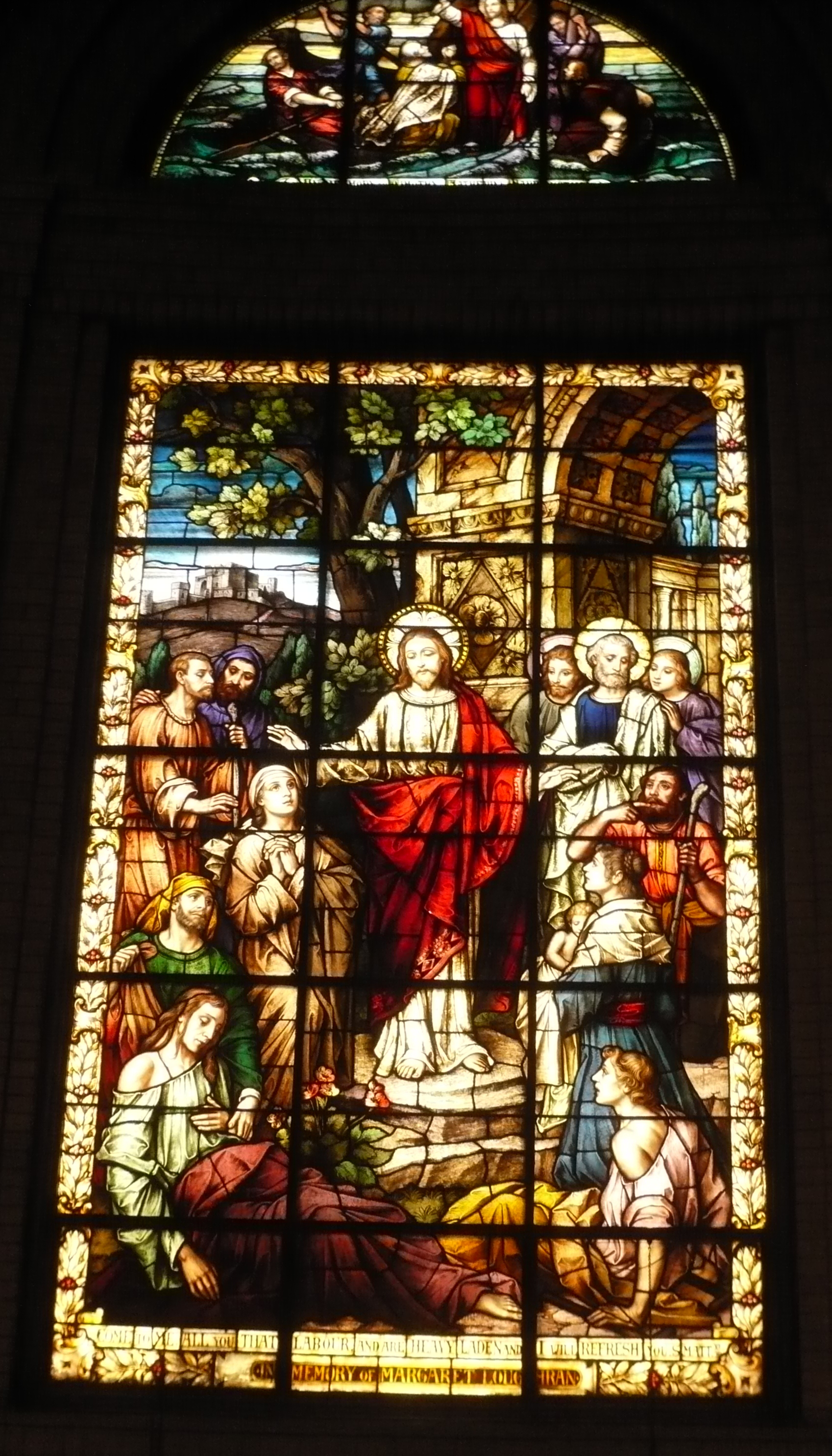
Christ Healing the Afflicted

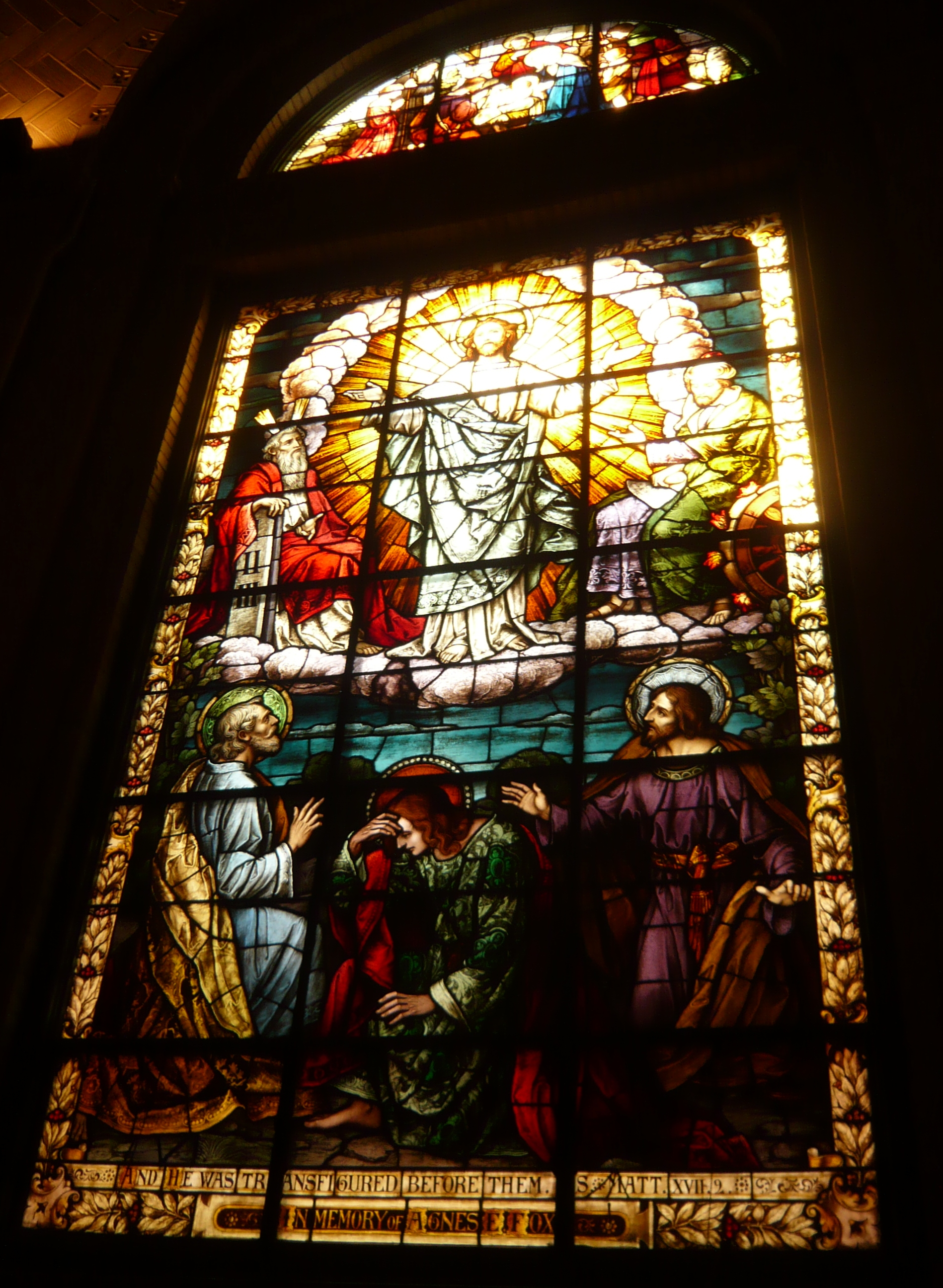
The Transfiguration of Christ

=== Chapels ===
To the right and the left of the high altar are two chapels.

==== Chapel of Our Lady ====
The first chapel, to the left of the altar, is a lady chapel named "Chapel of Our Lady" that contains a Marian altar made of marble, with a statue of the Immaculate Conception adorned by two angels. On the front of the Marian altar are carvings of St. Margaret, St. Lucia, St. Cecilia, St. Catherine of Alexandria, St. Barbara, St. Agnes, St. Agatha, and St. Rose of Lima. Forming a frame around the altar are a series of tiles with the names of the Blessed Virgin Mary selected from the Litany of the Blessed Virgin and in the center is a fragment of an Italian marble depicting the Nativity of Christ. Above the Marian altar are seven doves that represent the Seven Gifts of the Holy Spirit. The icons of the Blessed Virgin Mary in the chapel depict the Virgin Mary as Our Lady of Czestochowa, Our Lady of Perpetual Help, Our Lady of Guadalupe, and Our Lady of the Annunciation, with votive candles under each icon. The two stained glass windows in the chapel are of Our Lady, Star of the Sea and Saint Raphael the Archangel. In the back left of the chapel is the crypt of Rafael Guastavino.

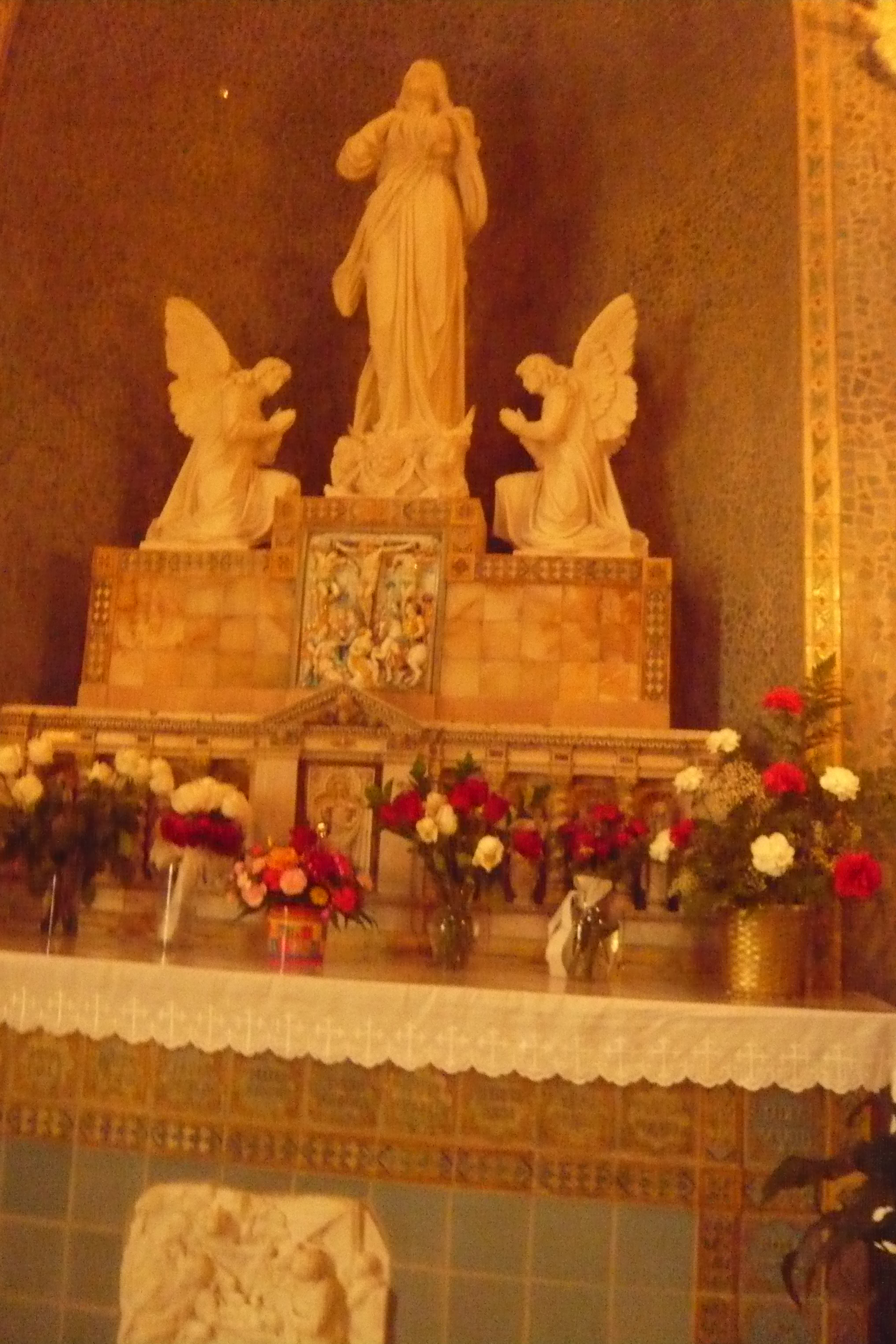
Marian altar

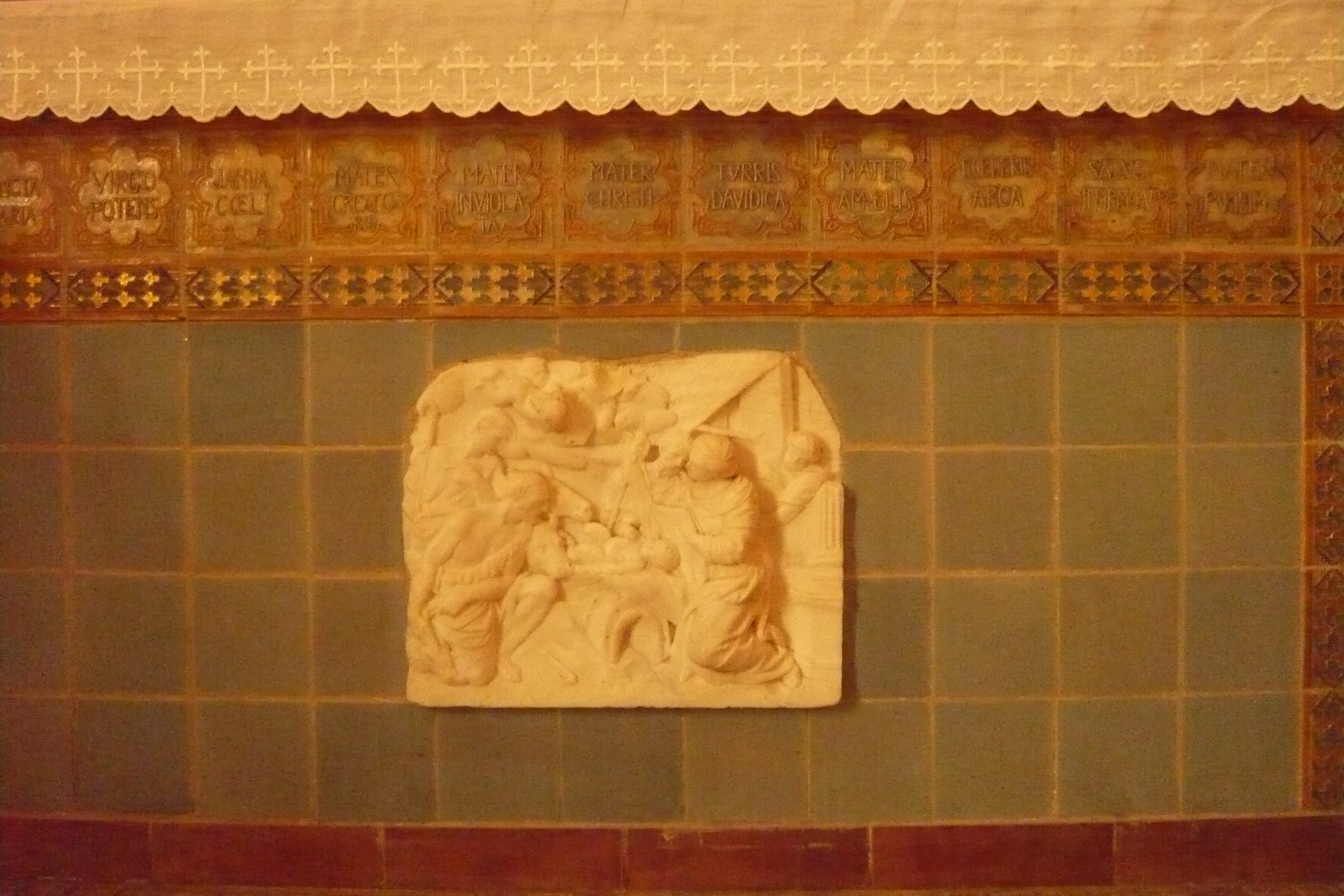
Italian marble relief of the Nativity of Christ

==== Eucharistic Adoration Chapel ====
The second chapel, to the right of the main altar, is the "Eucharistic Adoration Chapel", originally named the "Chapel of St. Joseph". The chapel is used for Eucharistic adoration and private prayer. The Holy Eucharist is displayed on the chapel's altar before and after Mass for adoration, prayer, and meditation. The stained-glass window above the altar depicts the Nativity of Christ, similar to the tile painting in the Marian chapel. The eastern wall's window is a stained glass painting depicting the death of Saint Joseph in the arms of his family: Jesus Christ and the Blessed Virgin Mary. The smaller window in the chapel depicts Saint Lawrence, to whom the basilica is dedicated. The chapel's altar and part of the apse wall are a mosaic of bits of tile assembled by Rev. Peter Marion and Rev. Patrick Marion, who were priests during the construction of the basilica.

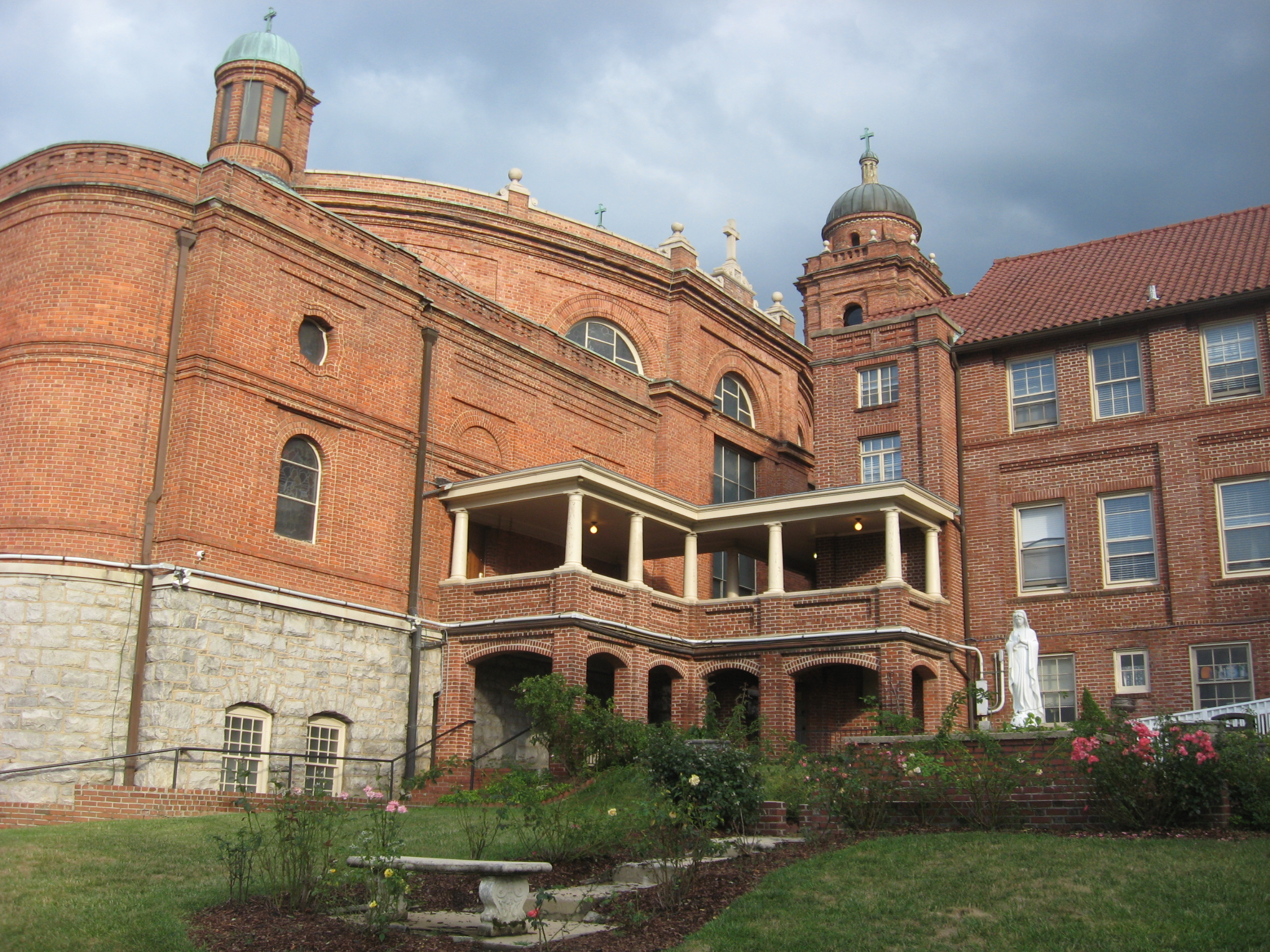
Mary garden behind the Basilica

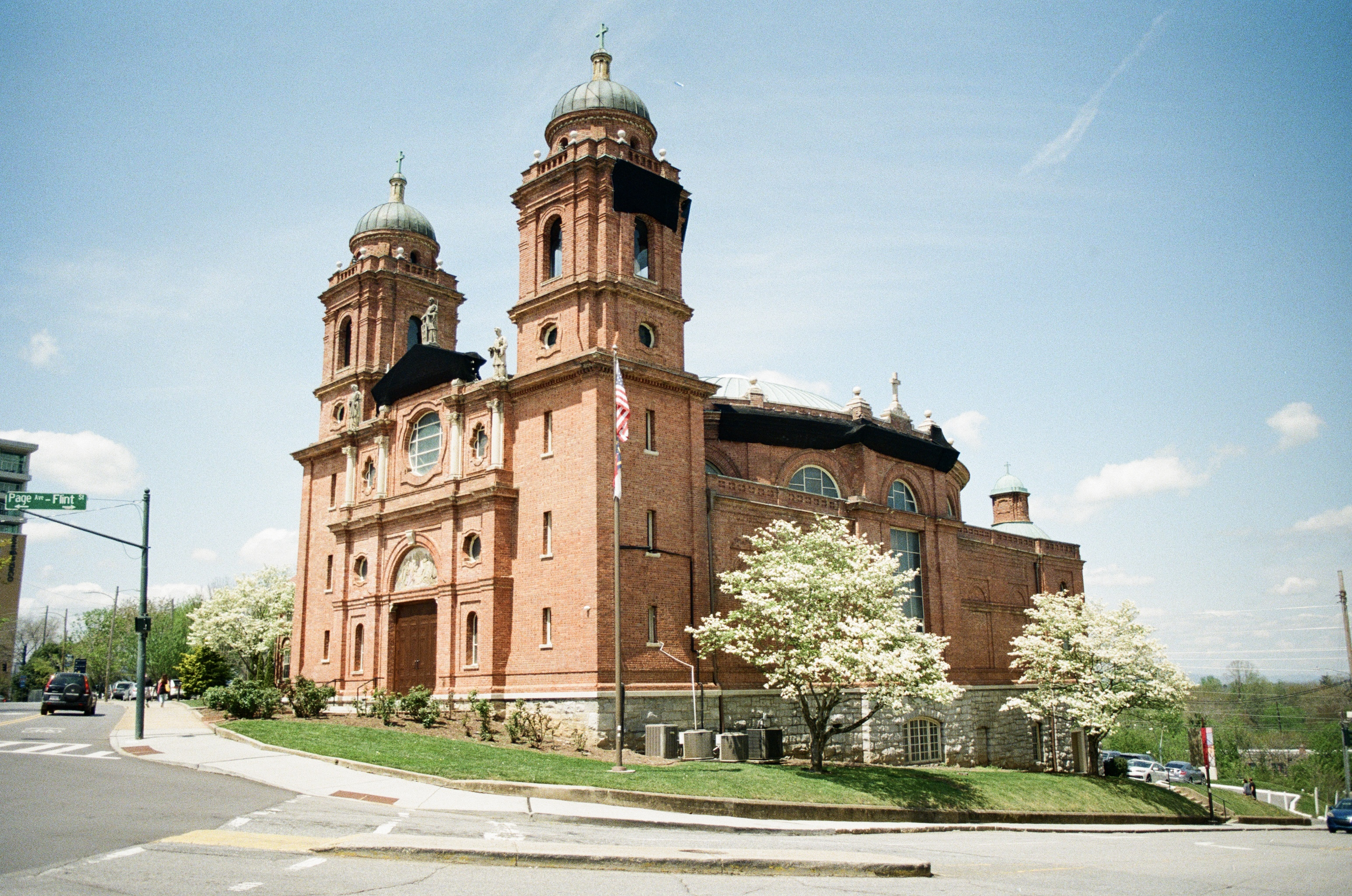
Basilica of St. Lawrence under renovations in April of 2022

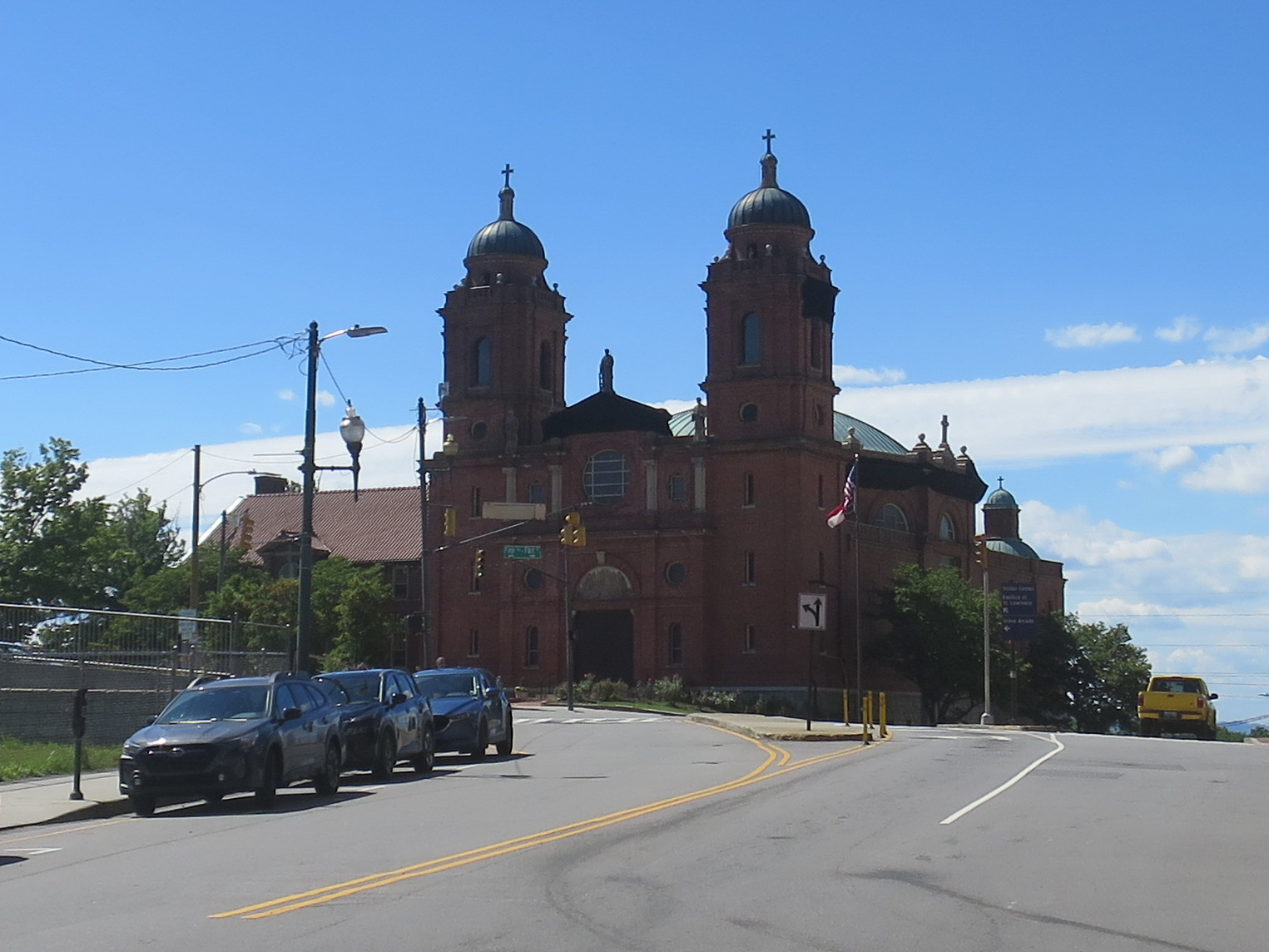
Basilica of St. Lawrence as viewed from Haywood St.

== Grounds ==
The basilica includes a rectory for the priest, a Catholic library, and a gift shop for tourists, which are open after weekend Masses. Behind the basilica is a Mary garden, which contains a life sized, white statue of the Blessed Virgin Mary.

== Restoration ==
The National Park Service declared the church a site of "National Significance" in 2010 for its "architectural and engineering distinctions, rather than its religious importance." A report by the church estimated the impact on tourism to be $30 million.

As of 2024, the Asheville Citizen-Times said the historic building had "significant damage to the interior and exterior of the building" and was in urgent need of repair and restoration". The basilica had water leaks, falling masonry due to mortar problems, and a copper dome that had reached its life expectancy. Improved rainwater collection and replacement of the cornice were also needed. The parish raised $3 million and the Basilica Preservation Fund received $1 million more, including $750,000 from the Save America's Treasures program, a grant announced by the NPS on August 20, 2024. An additional $2 million was needed just for the first phase but full restoration was expected to cost $23 million and take 10 years. John G. Waite Associates of New York City was helping with the project.

== Gallery ==
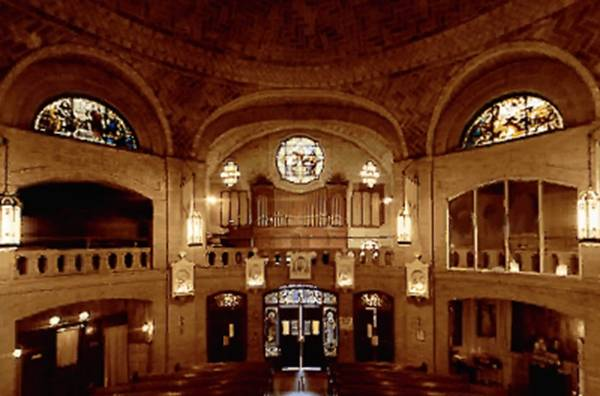
Rear of the Basilica

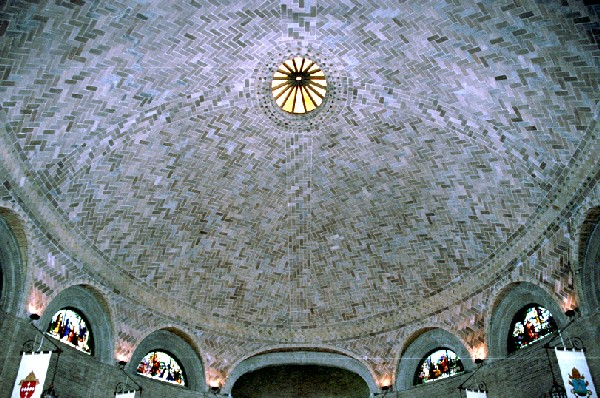
Dome of the Basilica

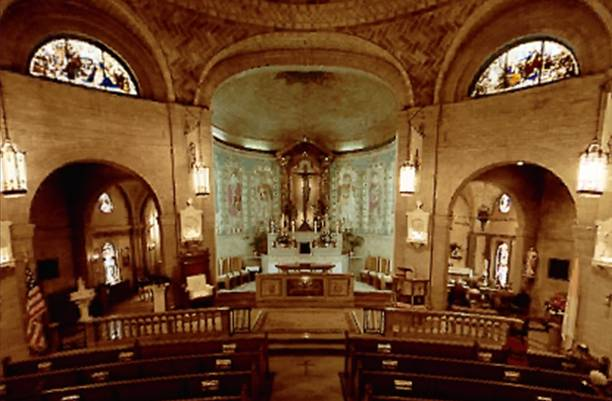
Altar of the Basilica

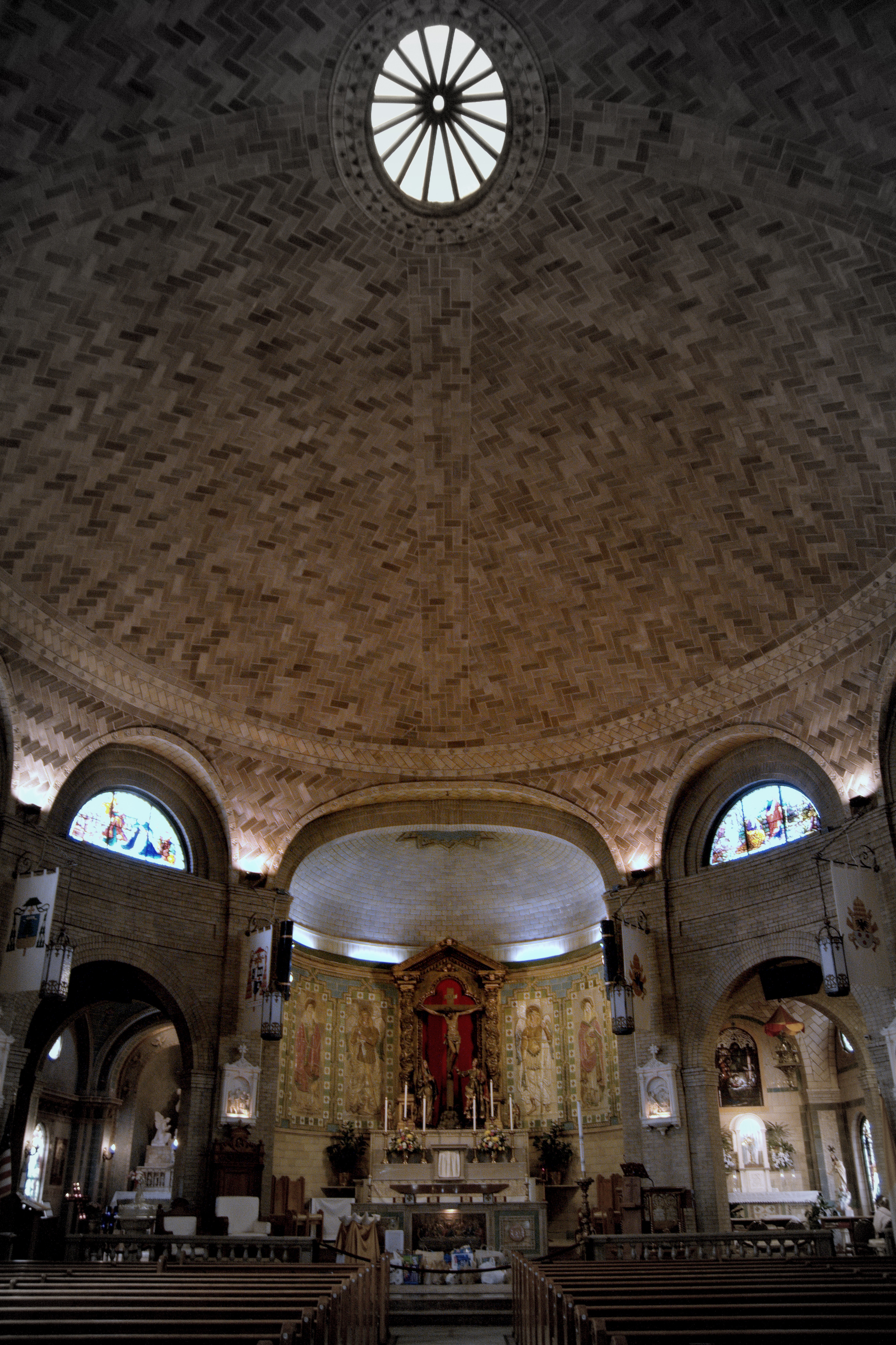
Inside the structure of the dome is the tomb of Rafael Guastavino
