= John R. Bryant =

Political leader

John R. Bryant was an American political leader in North Carolina. He was elected to represent Halifax County in the North Carolina House of Representatives in 1870 and 1872. He served in the North Carolina Senate during the 1874 and 1876–1877 terms. He was one of five African Americans serving during that term. They were Hanson T. Hughes, George A. Mebane, William H. Moore, and William P. Mabson.

He was succeeded in the North Carolina Senate by Henry Eppes.

== See also ==
- African American officeholders from the end of the Civil War until before 1900
