= George W. Price =

American politician (c.1843–1901)

George W. Price Jr. (c. 1843 – October 22, 1901) was a laborer, sailor, and politician in North Carolina. An African American, he served in the North Carolina House of Representatives and North Carolina Senate during the Reconstruction era.

Enslaved from birth in North Carolina, he worked as a plasterer to build a number of Wilmington landmarks, including the Bellamy Mansion and Thalian Hall. In 1862, along with William B. Gould and others, Price ran from slavery and joined the U. S Navy. After Emancipation, Price was elected state representative and senator from New Hanover County, North Carolina.

Prior to the Civil War, Price was enslaved by George Benticott. During a rainy night on September 21, 1862, Price escaped with seven other enslaved men (Note: They included William B. Gould, Joseph Hall, Andrew Hall, John Mackey, Charles Gile, John Mitchell, and William Chance.) by rowing a small boat 28 nautical miles (52 km) down the Cape Fear River. Just as the dawn was breaking, they rushed out into the Atlantic Ocean near Fort Caswell. There, the USS Cambridge of the Union blockade picked them up as contraband. Though they had no way of knowing it, within an hour and a half of their rescue President Abraham Lincoln convened a meeting of his cabinet to finalize plans to issue the Emancipation Proclamation.

Price enlisted into the United States Navy on board the Cambridge, but may have later deserted. (Note: Gould records in his diary that "George P---e" was one of three men who deserted.) He corresponded with William B. Gould throughout the war. After the war, Price grew to have considerable influence within the Black and Republican communities and was elected to the North Carolina House of Representatives from 1869-1870 and the North Carolina Senate from 1870 to 1872.

Price was known as an orator, and frequently spoke at ceremonies around North Carolina. In 1881, he led a Black delegation to Washington D.C. where they protested the unfair distribution of federal jobs to President James A. Garfield.

== Early life ==
George W. Price Jr. was born in 1843 or 1844. Enslaved in his youth, Price worked as a plasterer under his father, who, though enslaved, was a popular minister in the Wilmington area. In their capacity as plasterers they may have performed work on Bellamy Mansion and Thalian Hall.

== American Civil War and aftermath ==
One night in September 1862, amidst the American Civil War, Price, William B. Gould, and six other slaves escaped Wilmington by rowing a small boat out of its harbor to the USS Cambridge, a U.S. Navy ship enforcing the federal blockade. They subsequently enlisted in the navy. Price apparently deserted in November; Gould wrote in his diary that he went ashore in Beaufort on November 10 and never returned. One of Price's contemporaries later referenced his desertion in a political argument.

Price spent much of the remainder of the war in Union-occupied Beaufort and New Bern, which provided refuge to many escaped slaves. He became active in freedmen's politics, and on August 28, a mass meeting of blacks in the city elected him, Abraham Galloway, and John Randolph Jr. to advertise a statewide freedmen's convention in Raleigh on September 29. He attended the convention and, in August 1866, served on a committee on resolutions for a black assembly convened in New Bern to express support for the Freedmen's Bureau.

== Political career in Wilmington ==
Price eventually returned to Wilmington, establishing a residence close to his father's home. He worked as a merchant, real estate dealer, and African Methodist Episcopal Zion Church minister. He also continued to work as a plasterer.

Price was active in Republican Party politics. Benefitting from the political support of his father, he was elected to the Wilmington Board of Aldermen in 1868. Price was one of 17 colored men elected to the North Carolina House of Representatives in 1868, representing New Hanover County from 1869 to 1870. He served on its Committee of Military Affairs. He spoke frequently during the body's floor debates. In March 1869 he supported a resolution in favor of re-enfranchising Confederates who had been excluded from political life. In 1870, he was elected to fill a vacancy in the North Carolina Senate caused by the death of Abraham Galloway, serving from 1870 to 1872. As a state senator, he spoke against an attempt to call a new state constitutional convention for fear of voter suppression and opposed the realignment of the boundary between Nash and Edgecombe counties. In 1874 he became a city marshal and a justice of the peace.

Owing to his prominence, Price was frequently invited as a guest orator at large events in Wilmington. In 1881, he was selected by Republicans to lead a delegation to Washington D.C. to meet with President James A. Garfield to discuss allocations of federal patronage in North Carolina. His delegation met with the president on March 17 and advocated for the replacement of Raleigh postmaster William Woods Holden by James H. Harris. He led an additional delegation for the same purpose in May. In 1885, he was invited to speak before the General Assembly about "The Negro in the South". In 1887 he worked as a federal customs inspector. In 1889, Price was elected president of the North Carolina State Emigration Bureau, an organization which advocated for the departure of poor black farmers from the state in search of economic prospects elsewhere.

== Later life ==
Price continued to work as an artisan and plasterer into the 1890s. By the latter part of the decade he was working as an auctioneer. In 1900, he was recorded as the owner of the "Brooklyn Jobbing House," a used goods store. Price was struck and killed by a freight train at the Wm. E. Worth & Company ice factory in Wilmington on October 22, 1901. Investigators believed that Price had been attempting to cross the railroad tracks quickly when the train surprised him. Newspapers accounts conflict on his surviving relations. A funeral was held for him at Chestnut Street Presbyterian Church and he was buried at Pine Forest Cemetery.

== See also ==
- African American officeholders from the end of the Civil War until before 1900

== Works cited ==
- Alexander, Roberta Sue (1985). North Carolina Faces the Freedmen : Race Relations During Presidential Reconstruction 1865–67. Durham: Duke University Press. ISBN 0-8223-0628-X.
- Balanoff, Elizabeth (January 1972). "Negro Legislators in the North Carolina General Assembly, July, 1868-February, 1872". The North Carolina Historical Review. 49 (1): 22–55. JSTOR 23529002.
- Cecelski, David (2012). The Fire of Freedom: Abraham Galloway and the Slaves' Civil War. Chapel Hill: University of North Carolina. ISBN 978-1-4696-2190-6.
- Evans, William McKee (1995). Ballots and Fence Rails: Reconstruction on the Lower Cape Fear (reprint ed.). Athens: University of Georgia Press. ISBN 0-8203-1731-4.
- Gould IV, William B. (2002). Diary of a Contraband: The Civil War Passage of a Black Sailor (paperback ed.). Stanford University Press. ISBN 0-8047-4708-3.
- Justesen, Benjamin R. (2012). George Henry White: An Even Chance in the Race of Life (reprint ed.). Baton Rouge: Louisiana State University Press. ISBN 9780807144770.
- Reaves, William M. (1998). Strength Through Struggle: The Chronological and Historical Record of the African-American Community in Wilmington, North Carolina, 1865-1950. New Hanover Public Library. ISBN 9780967041001.
