= Mabson =

Mabson is a surname. Notable people with the surname include:

- George Lawrence Mabson (died 1885), American politician
- Omar Mabson II (born 2007), American football player
- William P. Mabson (1844 or 1846–1916), American politician
