= Wilmington Historic District =

Historic district in North Carolina, United States

- Wilmington Historic and Archeological District
- U.S. National Register of Historic Places
- U.S. Historic district
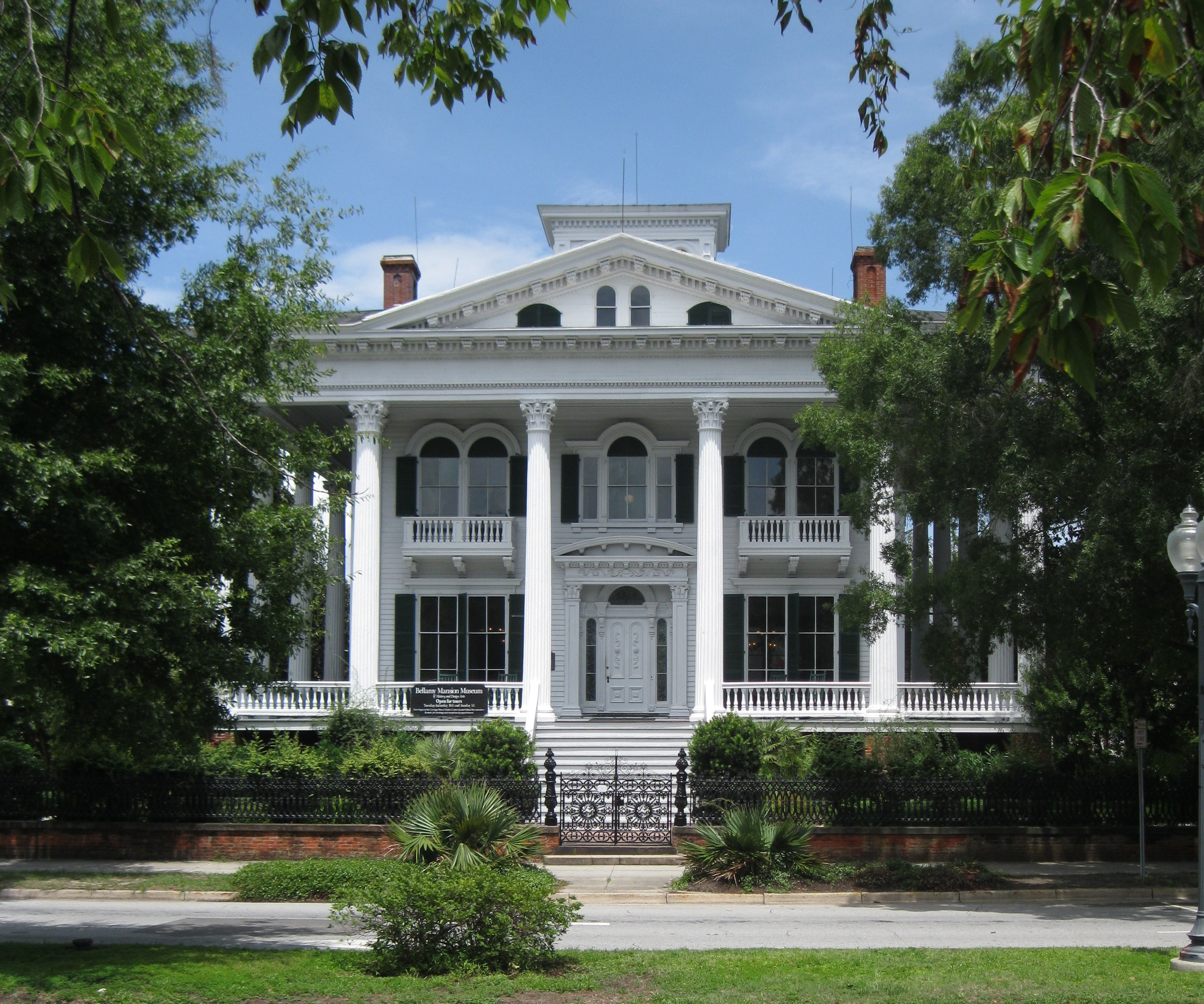
- Bellamy Mansion, August 2012

- Location within North Carolina Location within the United States
- Location: Roughly bounded by Wright, S. 7th, and Harnett Sts., and N/S line 100 yds. W of North East Cape Fear River; also roughly bounded by Harnett, 7th, 3rd, and Howard, Campbell, 9th, 12th, and Princess, Dock, Castle 8th, and 14th, and 9th, Wright, and Greenfield, Wilmington, North Carolina
- Coordinates: 34°14′06″N 77°57′03″W
- Area: 1,070 acres (430 ha)
- Built: 1737, 1898
- Architect: Lynch and Foard; Boney, Leslie N., Sr.
- Architectural style: Mixed (more Than 2 Styles From Different Periods); Queen Anne, Bungalow/craftsman, et al.
- NRHP reference No.: 74001364, 03000344 (Boundary Increase)
- Added to NRHP: May 6, 1974, May 1, 2003 (Boundary Increase)

The Wilmington Historic District is a national historic district located at Wilmington, New Hanover County, North Carolina. The district encompasses 875 contributing buildings 38 contributing sites, and 3 contributing structures in the historic core and surrounding residential sections of Wilmington. The district developed after Wilmington was laid out in 1737, and includes notable examples of Queen Anne and Bungalow/American Craftsman style architecture. Located in the district are the separately listed City Hall/Thalian Hall and Alton Lennon Federal Building and Courthouse. Other notable buildings include:

- Smith-Anderson House (c. 1745)
- St. John's Masonic Lodge (1803)
- Burgwin-Wright House and Gardens (1771)
- DuBois-Boatwright House
- George Cameron House (c. 1800)
- DeRosset House (c. 1845)
- Bellamy Mansion (1859)
- Edward Latimer House (1882)
- Burrus House (1880s)
- McKoy House (1887)
- Victoria Theatre (1915)
- Cape Fear Hotel (1923-1925)
- St. James Episcopal Church (begun 1839) designed by Thomas U. Walter
- St. Thomas Roman Catholic Church (1846)
- First Baptist Church (1859-1870) designed by Samuel Sloan
- Temple of Israel (1875)
- New Hanover County Courthouse (1892)
- St. Mary's Catholic Church (1912).

It was listed on the National Register of Historic Places in 1974, with a boundary increase in 2003.

== Gallery ==
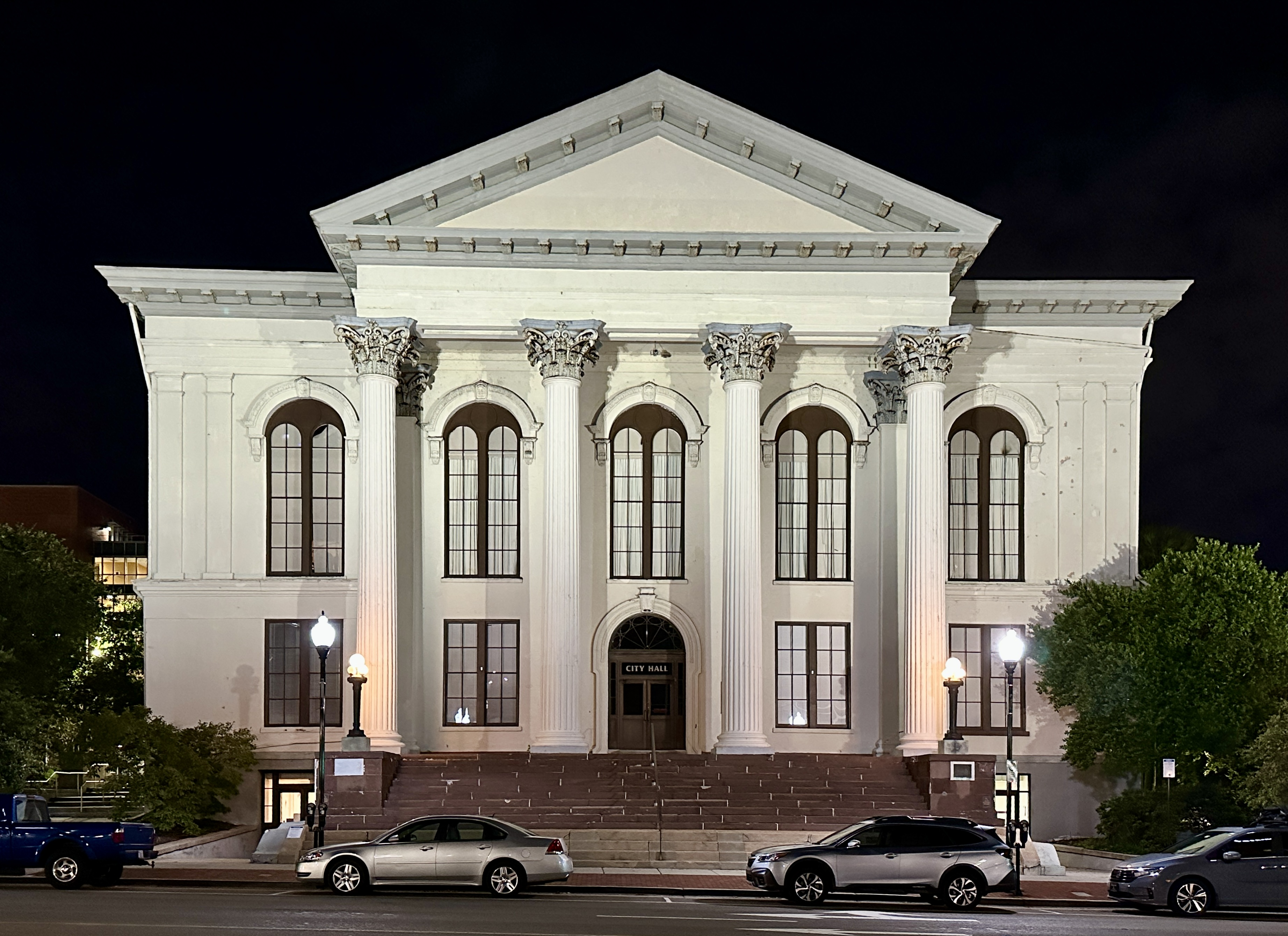
City Hall/Thalian Hall, 2025

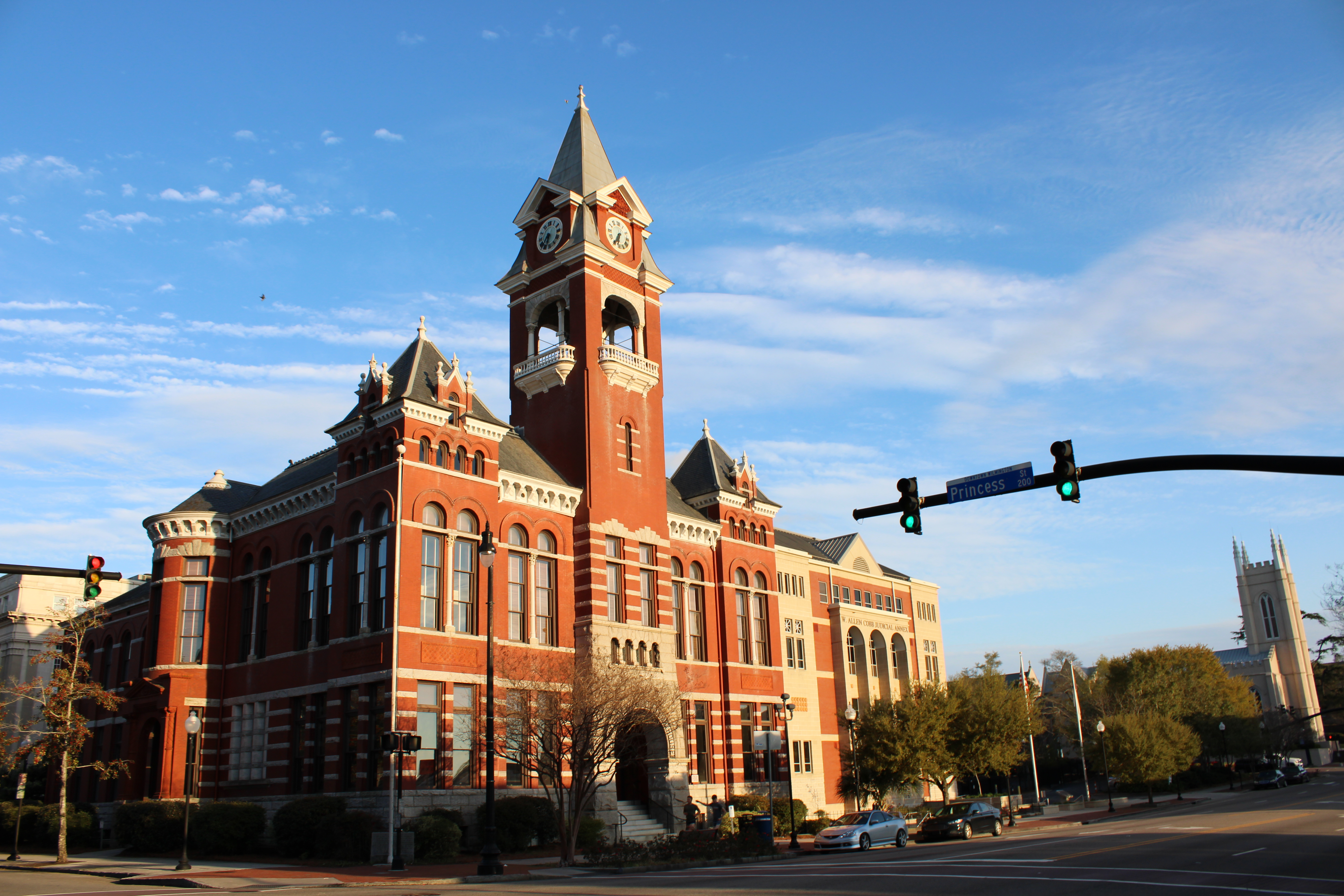
New Hanover County Courthouse, 2023

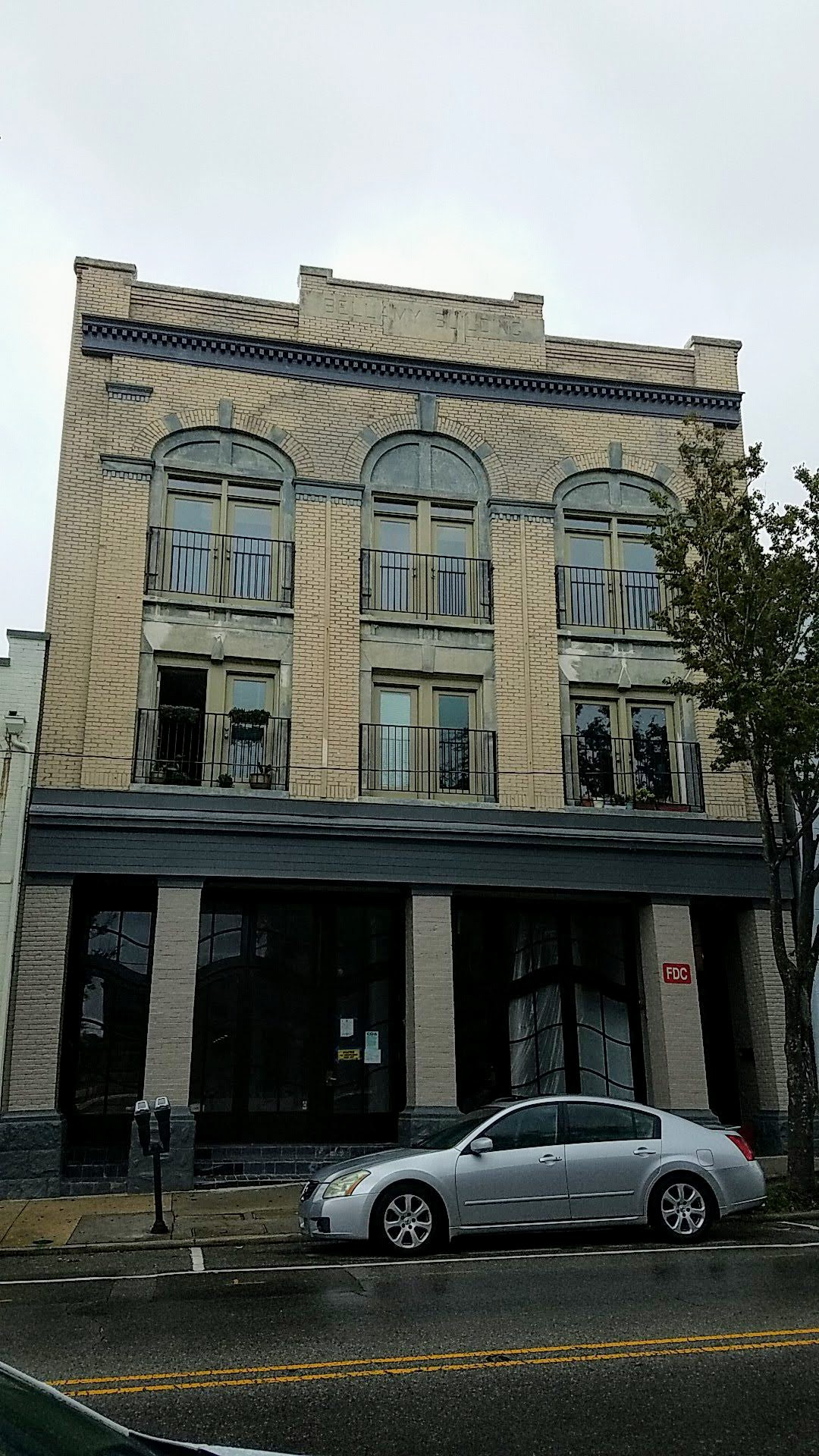
Bellamy-Wiggins Building, 2020

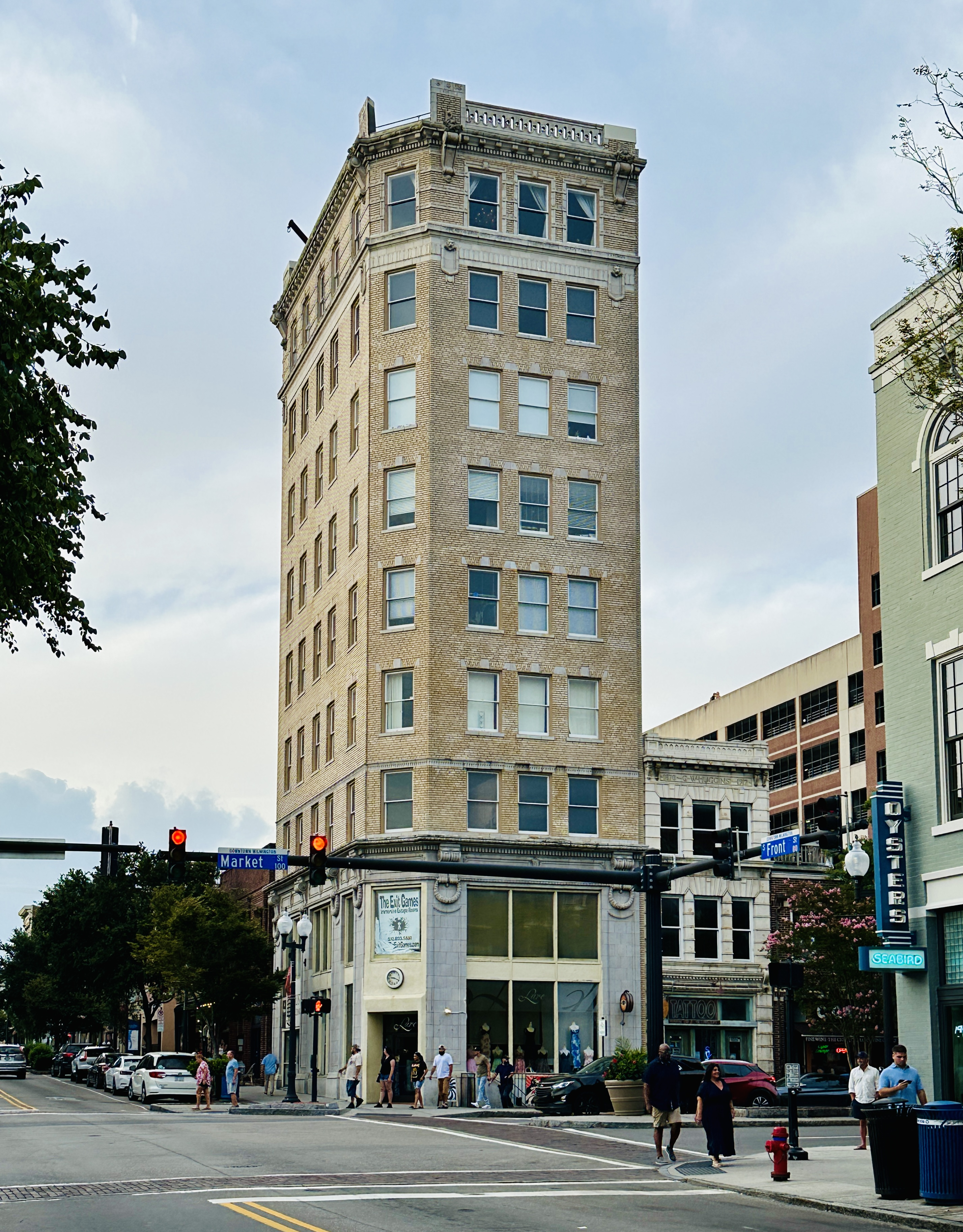
Trust Building, 2025

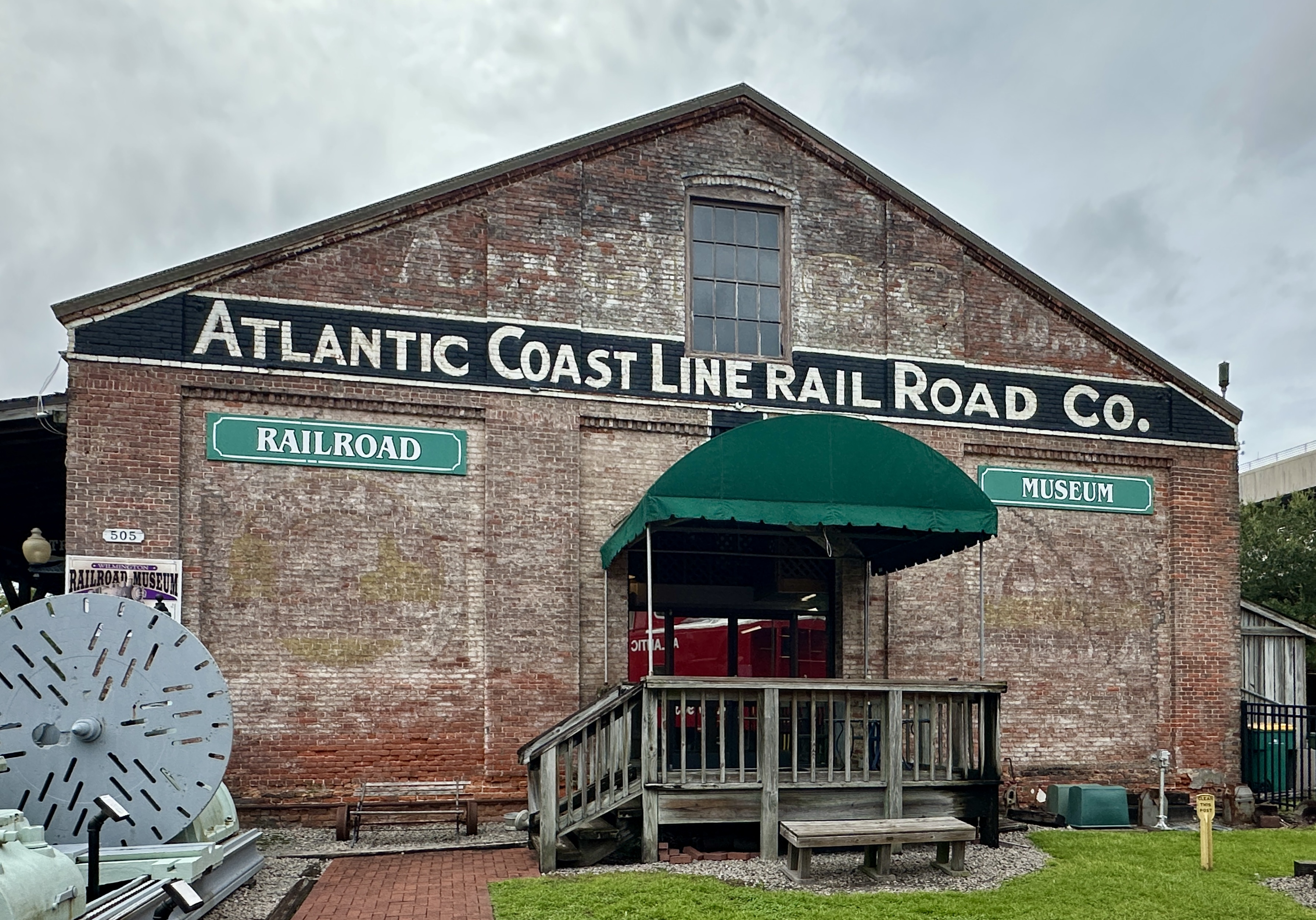
Wilmington Railroad Museum, 2025
