= William H. Moore (North Carolina politician) =

North Carolina politician

William H. Moore was a state legislator in North Carolina. He served in the North Carolina House of Representatives during the Reconstruction era. He represented New Hanover County and served with other African Americans in the state legislature. His post office was in Wilmington, North Carolina. He served with Henry Brewington and Alfred Lloyd who also represented New Hanover in the 1874-1875 session. All three were African Americans.

He represented New Hanover County in the North Carolina House of Representatives in 1874 and in the North Carolina Senate in 1876. In the 1874, all three of New Hanover's state representatives were African American. Henry Brewington and Alfred Lloyd were the others. He was African American.

In 1876 and 1877 he was one of five African American state senators in North Carolina. The others were Hanson T. Hughes, George A. Mebane, John R. Byrant, and William P. Mabson.

== See also ==
- African American officeholders from the end of the Civil War until before 1900
- William H. McLaurin
