= William P. Mabson =

African American 19th-century state legislator (1846–1916)

Member of the North Carolina Senate from the 5th district
- In office August 6, 1874 – August 1, 1878
- Preceded by: Henry Eppes
- Succeeded by: Franklin D. Dancy

Member of the North Carolina House of Representatives from Edgecombe County
- In office 1872–1873

Personal details
- Born: William Patrick Mabson c. 1844, or November 1, 1846 Wilmington, North Carolina, U.S.
- Died: December 20, 1916 Austin, Texas, U.S.
- Party: Republican
- Relations: George L. Mabson (brother)
- Occupation: Educator, minister, newspaper owner, editor, politician

William Patrick Mabson Sr. (c. 1844 or 1846 – December 20, 1916), was an American educator, minister, newspaper owner, editor, and politician. He was a state legislator in North Carolina for at least two terms, active during the Reconstruction era. Mabson was one of the founders of Freedom Hill (now Princeville) in Edgecombe County, North Carolina.

== Biography ==
William Patrick Mabson Sr. was the son of an African American woman, Eliza Moore, and a prominent white man, George W. Mabson, in Wilmington, North Carolina. His date of birth was either c. 1844 or November 1, 1846. His brother was George Lawrence Mabson, North Carolina's first Black lawyer.

Mabson was educated at Lincoln University in Pennsylvania. After the Civil war he moved to Freedom Hill, North Carolina. He and two others are credited with incorporating the town, now known as Princeville. He worked as a school teacher in 1867, a career he followed into the 1880s. He was a Methodist and also had worked as a Methodist minister.

Mabson was first elected to the North Carolina House of Representatives in 1872 representing Edgecombe County, North Carolina but in 1873 the legislature expelled him for not being an eligible resident of the county. He later was elected to the North Carolina Senate in 1874 and was one of five African Americans who served in the senate during the 1876–1877 session. (Note: The other four were George Mebane, William H. Moore, Hanson T. Hughes, and John R. Bryant.) He was also a delegate to North Carolina's 1875 constitutional convention. In 1880 he lost the election to Benjamin Hart, and his political career ended.

In 1889, he moved his family to Austin, Texas, and he remained active in politics. He was the owner and editor of the Austin Searchlight weekly Black political newspaper, which ceased production shortly after his death. Only a few issues of the Austin Searchlight exist in archives, and little is known about this former newspaper. Mabson died on December 20, 1916, in Austin, Texas.

== See also ==
- African American officeholders from the end of the Civil War until before 1900
