= George Mebane =

American state legislator

George Allen Mebane (born July 4, 1850) was a state legislator in North Carolina. He lived in Windsor. He was African American. He served in the North Carolina Senate during the 1876–1877 session representing Bertie County and Northampton County.

He served along with four other African Americans in the North Carolina Senate in the 1876–1877 session, William H. Moore, Hanson T. Hughes, John R. Bryant, and William P. Mabson.

== See also ==
- African American officeholders from the end of the Civil War until before 1900
