= William McLaurin =

American politician

William McLaurin was an American politician and Republican member of the North Carolina House of Representatives in the Reconstruction Era. He represented New Hanover County from 1872 to 1874. During the American Civil War, he met William B. Gould in New York City. McLaurin served in the Union Navy during the Civil War.

He was African American. He served with fellow African Americans Henry Brewington and Alfred Lloyd who also represented New Hanover County in the North Carolina House.

== Works cited ==
- Gould IV, William B. (2002). Diary of a Contraband: The Civil War Passage of a Black Sailor (paperback ed.). Stanford University Press. ISBN 0-8047-4708-3.
