= Cornelia Read =

American former enslaved woman (1837 – 1906)

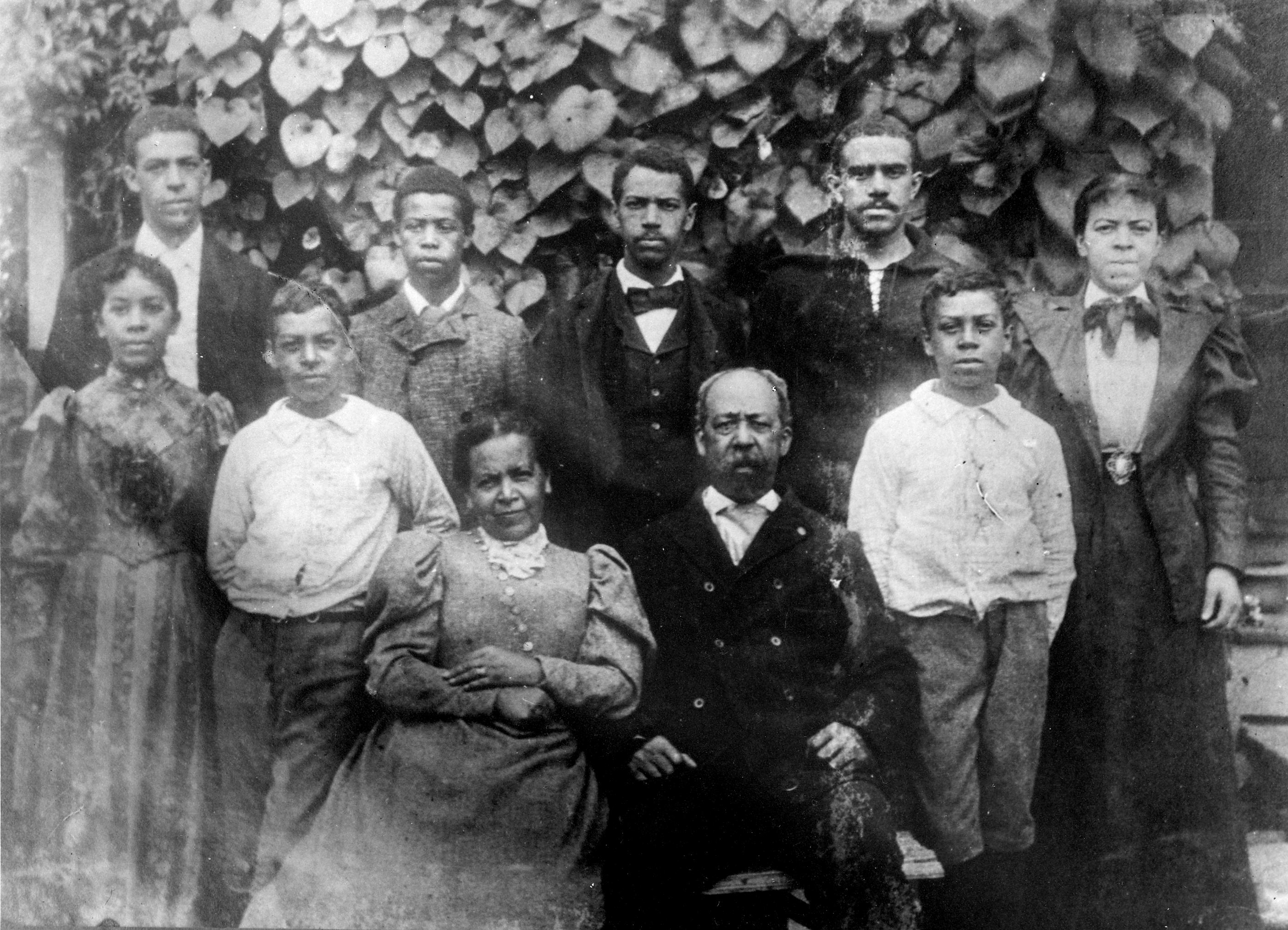
Cornelia (front left) and her family in the late 1880s

Cornelia Read (1837 – 1906) was an American woman known for her redemption from slavery.

== Early life ==
She was born into slavery on 30 May 1837 in Charleston, South Carolina, the daughter of William Read and his wife Diana, née Williams. In 1858 she was in Wilmington, North Carolina, owned by John Maffit.

== Redemption from slavery ==
A fundraising effort by Diana’s sisters Ann and Julia Williams and the Nantucket African Baptist Church raised $700 to redeem Diana. Ann's husband Rev James Crawford, pastor of the Church, traveled to North Carolina to redeem Cornelia for $1000, passing as white on the train journey. James Crawford brought the two women into his household and later married Diana. Cornelia and her younger cousin Juliana became managers of the household after the death of Diana in 1860.

== Later life and family ==
In Nantucket she became the most frequent correspondent of Union Navy officer William B. Gould, whom she had probably met in Wilmington. Gould said that they had known each other since childhood, but 'their relationship seems to have flowered after he visits her in Nantucket in May 1863 when his ship is docked in Boston.' They married on 22 November 1865 and moved to Dedham, Massachusetts, where they raised their seven children. Their great-grandson is lawyer William B. Gould IV. Cornelia was active in the work of the Episcopal Church of the Good Shepherd, which her husband had founded, and that of the Grand Army of the Republic, a veterans’ organisation.
