= Alton Lennon Federal Building and Courthouse =

- Federal Building and Courthouse
- U.S. National Register of Historic Places
- U.S. Historic district – Contributing property
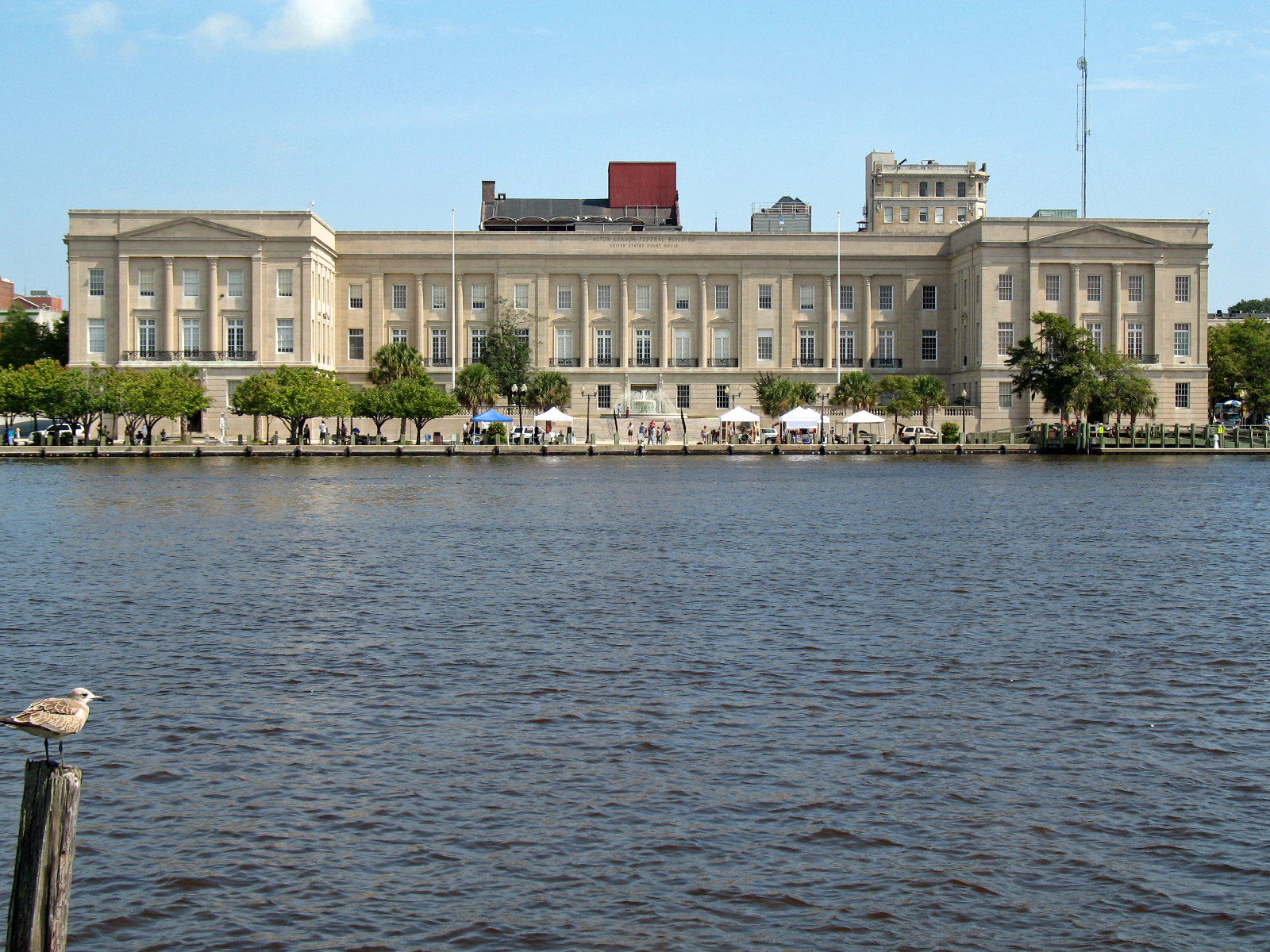
- Federal Building and Courthouse, September 2009

- Location within North Carolina Location within the United States
- Location: N. Water between Market and Princess St., Wilmington, North Carolina
- Coordinates: 34°14′7″N 77°57′0″W
- Area: 0.8 acres (0.32 ha)
- Built: 1916-1919
- Architect: Wetmore, James A.
- Architectural style: Classical Revival
- NRHP reference No.: 74001363
- Added to NRHP: May 2, 1974

Alton Lennon Federal Building and Courthouse, also known as the Customs House, is a historic Federal building and courthouse located at Wilmington, New Hanover County, North Carolina. It was designed by the Office of the Supervising Architect under James A. Wetmore and built between 1916 and 1919. It is an imposing three-story, Classical Revival style light sandstone building. It consists of a central mass with balanced projecting wings having engaged pedimented porticos. The design of the front facade of the earlier 1840s customs house is incorporated into the projecting wings to the cast iron details. The building measures 332 feet by 113 feet. The building was named for U.S. Congressman and Senator Alton Lennon (1906-1986) in 1976. It was used as the outside of the courthouse on seasons 7-9 of Andy Griffith's TV series Matlock on ABC.

The Lennon Building was listed on the National Register of Historic Places in 1974. It is located in the Wilmington Historic District. It houses the Wilmington Division of the United States District Court for the Eastern District of North Carolina.
