= Caterina Jarboro =

American opera singer

Background information
- Born: July 24, 1898; Wilmington, North Carolina
- Died: August 13, 1986 (aged 88) Manhattan, New York City
- Genres: Opera
- Formerly of: Alfredo Salmaggi

Caterina Jarboro (born Katherine "Katie" Lee Yarborough; July 24, 1898 – August 13, 1986) was an American opera singer. She was the first black female opera singer to sing with a major company, twenty-two years before Marian Anderson's début at the Metropolitan Opera.

== Biography ==
Jarboro was born in 1898 as Katherine Lee Yarborough in Wilmington, North Carolina. Her father John was African American and her mother Annie was Native American. She had at least four siblings and was raised Catholic, having been baptized at St Thomas Church in her hometown.

Jarboro studied in North Carolina and then in New York. She sang in the theater musical Shuffle Along and in James P. Johnson's Running Wild. In 1930 she debuted in opera with Verdi's Aida at the Puccini Theatre in Milan, Italy.

In 1933, twenty-two years before Marian Anderson's début at the Metropolitan Opera, impresario Alfredo Salmaggi hired Jarboro to sing with his opera company at the New York Hippodrome. She was presented in the title role of Verdi's Aida.

Later she appeared with the company as Sélika in Meyerbeer's L'Africaine. She was the first female black opera singer ever to perform a leading role with an otherwise all-white company in America (baritone Jules Bledsoe had sung Amonasro with the Cleveland Stadium Opera in 1932). This milestone earned Salmaggi special recognition from First Lady Eleanor Roosevelt. Many other opera appearances throughout Europe followed.

She returned to the United States in 1941. Among her performances were a recitals at the Town Hall in 1942 and Carnegie Hall in 1944. The New York Metropolitan Opera Association invited her to become a member, but when they realized she was not Italian, but Afro-Indian, they denied her membership. After a lengthy and successful career she declined membership when a second invitation was extended. She retired in 1955. She was a member of Alpha Kappa Alpha sorority.

Jarboro died on August 13, 1986, in Manhattan at age 88. Her siblings alive at her time of death were Joseph Yarborough of Philadelphia, and Anna Gayle of Palmetto, Florida.
