= William P. Canaday =

American politician and newspaper editor

William Parker Canaday
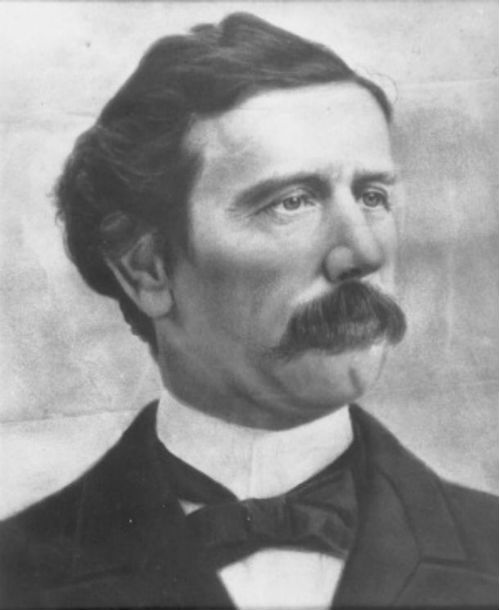

Sergeant at Arms of the United States Senate
- In office December 18, 1883 – June 30, 1890

Personal details
- Born: Carteret County, North Carolina
- Died: September 27, 1892
- Party: Republican

William Parker Canaday (died September 27, 1892) was an American politician and newspaper editor. Born and raised in North Carolina, he served in the Confederate States Army during the American Civil War. He later joined the Republican Party and edited The Wilmington Post, a Republican paper, from 1872 to 1884. He served as Sergeant at Arms of the United States Senate from 1883 to 1890.

== Early life ==
Canaday was born and raised on a farm in Carteret County, North Carolina.

Upon the outbreak of the American Civil War, Canaday enlisted in the 10th North Carolina Regiment, Confederate States Army. He was commissioned as a lieutenant in Company G in November 1863 and served through the end of the war. Afterwards he worked as a rosin weigher at the port of Wilmington.

== Political career ==
Canaday joined the North Carolina Republican Party upon its creation. (Note: Historian William McKee Evens attributed Canaday's choice of political affiliation to his disdain of the local aristocracy and a sympathy for the "plain people of the South".) He quickly garnered a following among Wilmington's blacks and white working class population. A strong proponent for equal rights for blacks, he advocated for allocation of political patronage to them to increase their representation in government. When warned by a Republican journalist that he was "kindling a fire among the negroes that you will not be able to put out," Canaday replied that he would "keep up the flames, until justice is done the long oppressed colored people of this country." The Wilmington Journal, a Conservative paper, denounced him for practicing "social equality by eating and drinking together [with blacks] at the same time and at the same table." He was appointed by Governor William Woods Holden to the rank of colonel and shared command of the 22nd Regiment of the North Carolina Militia with fellow politician George Lawrence Mabson.

As customs collector in Wilmington, 12 of his 17 staffers were black. In 1873, Canaday was elected mayor of Wilmington, while Republicans secured control of the board of aldermen. In February 1875, the Conservative majority in the North Carolina General Assembly moved to break Republican control over the city by amending its charter to gerrymander Republicans into one district, enacting stricter voter registration requirements, and mandating a new election on March 11. Conservatives won control over the board and elected A. H. Van Bokkelen as mayor. After the incumbents refused to vacate their offices, Bokkelen sued to have them removed, leading to the case Bokkelen v. Canaday being debated before the North Carolina Supreme Court in June. The court ruled unanimously in favor of the incumbents and voided the gerrymander and March election.

In 1872, Canady assumed the editorship of The Wilmington Post, the city's Republican paper, which had been caught in Republican factional disputes and suffered from high turnover and financial difficulties. Under his editorship, the paper's written quality suffered and printed more scandalous news stories but embraced more democratic values. He also assumed a more politically confrontational tone, declaring that he was not managing a "milk and cider concern" and daring his critics to make good on their threats towards the paper's staff. He hired black journalist C. H. Moore to serve as an associate editor. In response to Conservative race-baiting tactics, Canaday's Post launched personal attacks against its political opponents, including making open accusations of miscegenation. Despite his fervor, the paper continued to suffer from financial problems due to a lack of advertising customers. The declining fortunes of the Republican Party in the state as well as the physical degradation of the paper's printing press led Canaday to cease publication in 1884.

Following Republican James Garfield's inauguration as president of the United States, a delegation of North Carolina Republicans came to the White House to see him with Canaday acting as their master of ceremonies. He was one of the few white public figures in the state to support conventions held by black Republicans in May 1881 and March 1882 to discuss and encourage their civic and political participation in North Carolina.

In 1882, Canaday ran as the Republican candidate in North Carolina's 3rd congressional district, narrowly losing to the Democratic candidate.

Canaday secured election as Sergeant at Arms of the United States Senate largely owing to his friendship with Senator John Sherman. Sherman nominated him to the post on December 18, 1883 and he was elected in a vote, 32 to 28. While serving in that capacity he enticed several Senators to invest in several enterprises in which several lost money. Former Senator William Mahone sued Canaday after he refused to refund him for returned shares of the Gold Mining Company of Arizona, which several senators declared was a fraudulent business. As a result, he was pressured to resign, with his retirement announced on May 21, 1890 effective June 30.

Canaday subsequently opened an office in Washington D.C. from which he conducted various businesses, including a law office, money lending, and patent insurance.

== Death ==
Canaday died by suicide on September 27, 1892.

== Works cited ==
- Beckel, Deborah (2010). Radical Reform: Interracial Politics in Post-Emancipation North Carolina. University of Virginia Press. ISBN 9780813930527.
- Clark, Walter, ed. (1901). Histories of the Several Regiments and Battalions from North Carolina in the Great War, 1861–1865. Vol. I. Raleigh: State of North Carolina. LCCN 02026034.
- Evans, William McKee (1995). Ballots and Fence Rails: Reconstruction on the Lower Cape Fear (reprint ed.). Athens: University of Georgia Press. ISBN 0-8203-1731-4.
- Justesen, Benjamin R. (2012). George Henry White: An Even Chance in the Race of Life (reprint ed.). Baton Rouge: Louisiana State University Press. ISBN 9780807144770.
- Plambeck, Charles Thelen (May 2025). "Constitutional History of the North Carolina Free Elections Clause". North Carolina Law Review. 103 (4): 1143–1244.
