= Porters Neck, North Carolina =

- Unincorporated community
- Location within North Carolina Location within the United States
- Coordinates: 34°17′39″N 77°46′10″W
- Country: United States
- State: North Carolina
- County: New Hanover

Area
  - Total: 5.78 sq mi (14.98 km^{2})
  - Land: 5.41 sq mi (14.01 km^{2})
  - Water: 0.37 sq mi (0.97 km^{2})
- Elevation: 20 ft (6.1 m)

Population (2020)
  - Total: 7,397
  - Density: 1,367.2/sq mi (527.87/km^{2})
- Time zone: UTC-5 (Eastern (EST))
  - Summer (DST): UTC-4 (EDT)
- Area codes: 910, 472
- GNIS feature ID: 2584329

Porters Neck is an unincorporated community and census-designated place in New Hanover County, North Carolina, United States. As of the 2020 census, Porters Neck had a population of 7,397.

== History ==
William B. Gould was enslaved on Nicholas Nixon's plantation on Porters Neck before escaping in 1862.

== Geography ==
According to the U.S. Census Bureau, the community has an area of 5.708 square miles (14.78 km^{2}); 5.365 square miles (13.90 km^{2}) of its area is land, and 0.343 square miles (0.89 km^{2}) is water.

== Demographics ==
Historical population
Census	Pop.	Note	%±
2010	6,204		—
2020	7,397		19.2%
U.S. Decennial Census

=== 2020 census ===
As of the 2020 census, Porters Neck had a population of 7,397. The median age was 53.5 years. 17.9% of residents were under the age of 18 and 35.8% of residents were 65 years of age or older. For every 100 females there were 86.9 males, and for every 100 females age 18 and over there were 83.7 males age 18 and over.

97.9% of residents lived in urban areas, while 2.1% lived in rural areas.

There were 3,164 households in Porters Neck, of which 23.6% had children under the age of 18 living in them. Of all households, 62.3% were married-couple households, 11.2% were households with a male householder and no spouse or partner present, and 23.1% were households with a female householder and no spouse or partner present. About 26.8% of all households were made up of individuals and 18.0% had someone living alone who was 65 years of age or older.

There were 3,403 housing units, of which 7.0% were vacant. The homeowner vacancy rate was 1.2% and the rental vacancy rate was 3.8%.

Racial composition as of the 2020 census
Race	Number	Percent
White	6,593	89.1%
Black or African American	218	2.9%
American Indian and Alaska Native	11	0.1%
Asian	112	1.5%
Native Hawaiian and Other Pacific Islander	2	0.0%
Some other race	101	1.4%
Two or more races	360	4.9%
Hispanic or Latino (of any race)	253	3.4%
