= Basilica Shrine of St. Mary (Wilmington, North Carolina) =

Historic Catholic basilica in Wilmington, North Carolina

Basilica Shrine of Saint Mary
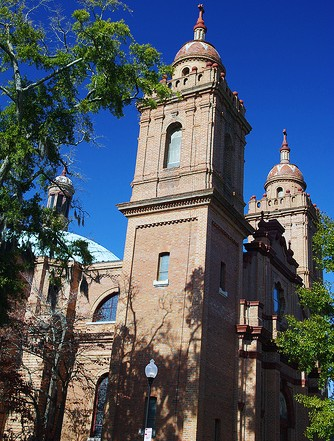
- Basilica Shrine of Saint Mary
- Basilica Shrine of Saint Mary
- Location: 412 Ann Street, Wilmington, North Carolina
- Country: United States
- Denomination: Catholic Church
- Sui iuris church: Latin Church
- Website: www.saintmarybasilica.org

History
- Status: Minor basilica, diocesan shrine, parish church
- Dedication: Blessed Virgin Mary
- Dedicated: April 12, 1912

Architecture
- Functional status: Active
- Architect: Rafael Guastavino
- Style: Spanish Baroque
- Years built: 1908–1911
- Groundbreaking: May 20, 1908

Specifications
- Materials: Brick and tile

Administration
- Diocese: Raleigh

Clergy
- Bishop: Luis R. Zarama
- Vicar: Rev. Drew Eliot Navarro
- Pastor: Very Rev. Jairo Alberto Maldonado-Pacheco
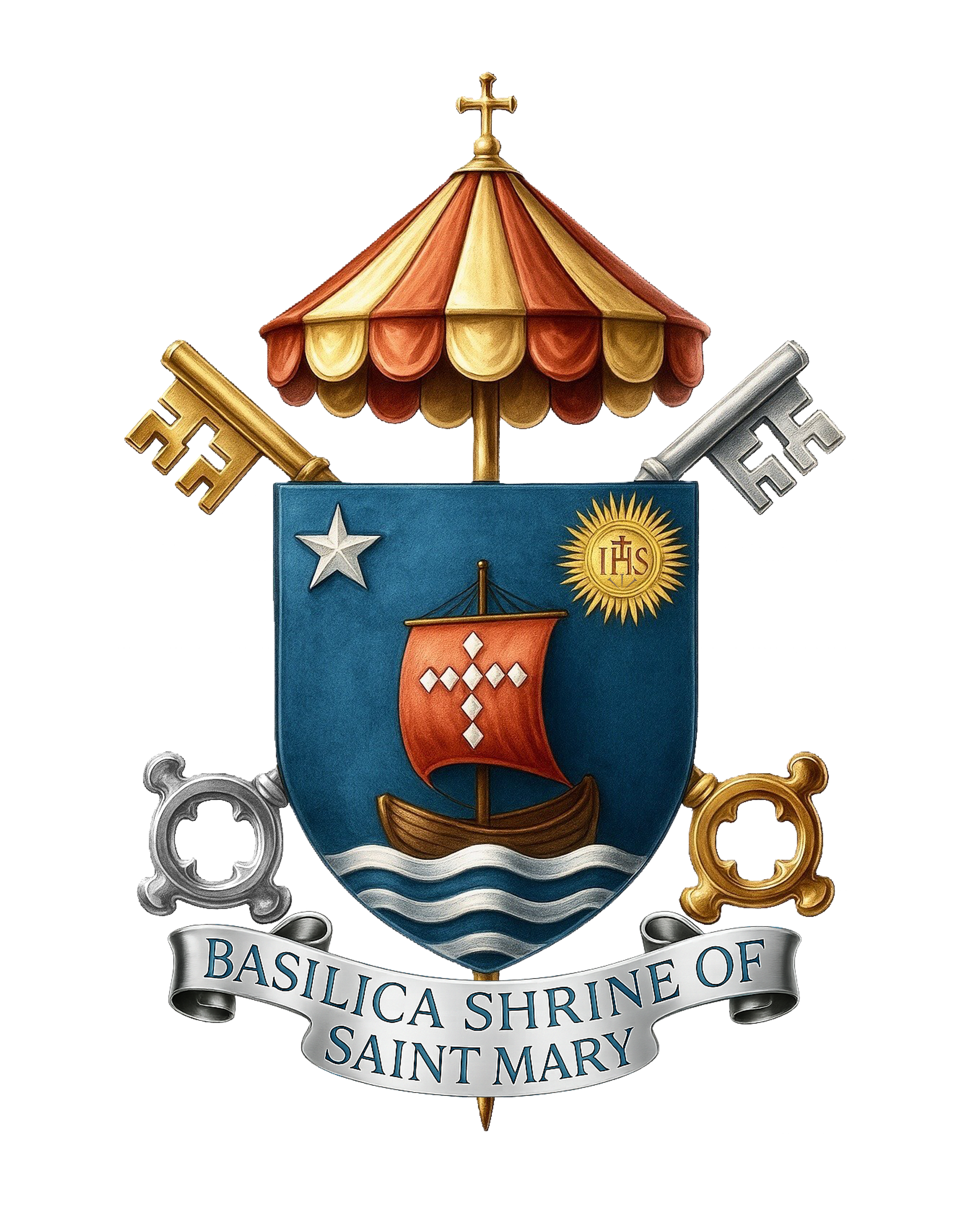
- St. Mary's Catholic Church
- U.S. Historic district – Contributing property
- Location within North Carolina Location within the United States
- Location: 412 Ann St. Wilmington, North Carolina
- Coordinates: 34°13′55.9″N 77°56′35.9″W
- Part of: Wilmington Historic District (ID74001364)
- Added to NRHP: May 6, 1974

The Basilica Shrine of Saint Mary is a Catholic minor basilica, diocesan shrine, and parish church in Wilmington, North Carolina, United States. It belongs to the Diocese of Raleigh. The present Spanish Baroque church, designed by Spanish architect Rafael Guastavino and completed in 1911, is notable for its self-supporting brick-and-tile vaulting and dome.

The church served as a pro-cathedral for the Catholic jurisdiction in North Carolina before the establishment of the Diocese of Raleigh. It was designated a diocesan shrine in 2005 and was granted the title of minor basilica in 2013.

St. Mary's is a contributing property in the Wilmington Historic District, which was added to the National Register of Historic Places in 1974.

== History ==
=== Early Catholic community ===
The history of the parish dates to the early nineteenth century, when John England, bishop of the Diocese of Charleston, periodically visited Wilmington and celebrated Mass for the city's small Catholic population in private homes and, on occasion, Protestant churches.

England's successor, Bishop Ignatius A. Reynolds, formally established the Wilmington parish on January 1, 1845. The Rev. Thomas Murphy was appointed its first resident priest. In 1846–1847 Murphy oversaw construction of St. Thomas the Apostle Catholic Church on Dock Street, the first Catholic church in Wilmington.

In 1868, James Gibbons, the newly appointed vicar apostolic of North Carolina, took up residence in Wilmington, and St. Thomas became his pro-cathedral. Gibbons later became archbishop of Baltimore and a cardinal.

Gibbons invited the Sisters of Our Lady of Mercy from Charleston to Wilmington in 1869. The sisters established a convent and began a Catholic school, beginning a long association between the parish and Catholic education in Wilmington.

=== Construction of St. Mary's ===
By the beginning of the twentieth century, the congregation had outgrown St. Thomas. Plans for a larger church were developed under the pastor, Monsignor Christopher Dennen, on parish property at South Fifth Avenue and Ann Street.

Ground was broken on May 20, 1908. Leo Michael Haid, O.S.B., the vicar apostolic of North Carolina, laid the cornerstone. The church was designed by Spanish-born architect Rafael Guastavino, whose patented tile-vaulting system had been employed in numerous major American buildings. Guastavino died in February 1908, and construction was carried forward by his son, Rafael Guastavino Jr.

The first service in the new church was held on December 17, 1911. Cardinal James Gibbons returned to Wilmington and dedicated the building as St. Mary Pro-Cathedral on April 12, 1912.

When the Diocese of Raleigh was established in 1924, St. Mary's ceased to function as a pro-cathedral and became St. Mary Church. The episcopal see was established in Raleigh.

=== St. Thomas parish and racial segregation ===
The earlier St. Thomas church was initially expected to be demolished after St. Mary's was constructed. Instead, in 1911–1912, Katharine Drexel, founder of the Sisters of the Blessed Sacrament, provided funds for its acquisition for the use of Wilmington's African-American Catholic community.

The Josephites assumed responsibility for St. Thomas in 1916. A separate Catholic school for Black children also operated in association with the parish. Catholic schools in the Diocese of Raleigh were desegregated during the 1960s.

A major fire damaged St. Thomas in 1966, after which the St. Thomas and St. Mary congregations were merged. St. Thomas was later deconsecrated and became the present-day Saint Thomas Preservation Hall.

=== Shrine and basilica ===
St. Mary was designated the Diocesan Shrine of Saint Mary on December 6, 2005.

On June 13th 2013, the Holy See granted St. Mary the title of minor basilica, and the church subsequently adopted the name Basilica Shrine of Saint Mary. A historical marker erected by the Historic Wilmington Foundation gives August 2, 2013, as the date on which the church became known as the Basilica Shrine of Saint Mary.

The basilica remains an active parish of the Diocese of Raleigh. As of 2026, its pastor and rector is the Very Rev. Jairo Alberto Maldonado-Pacheco and its parochial vicar is the Rev. Drew Eliot Navarro.

== Architecture ==
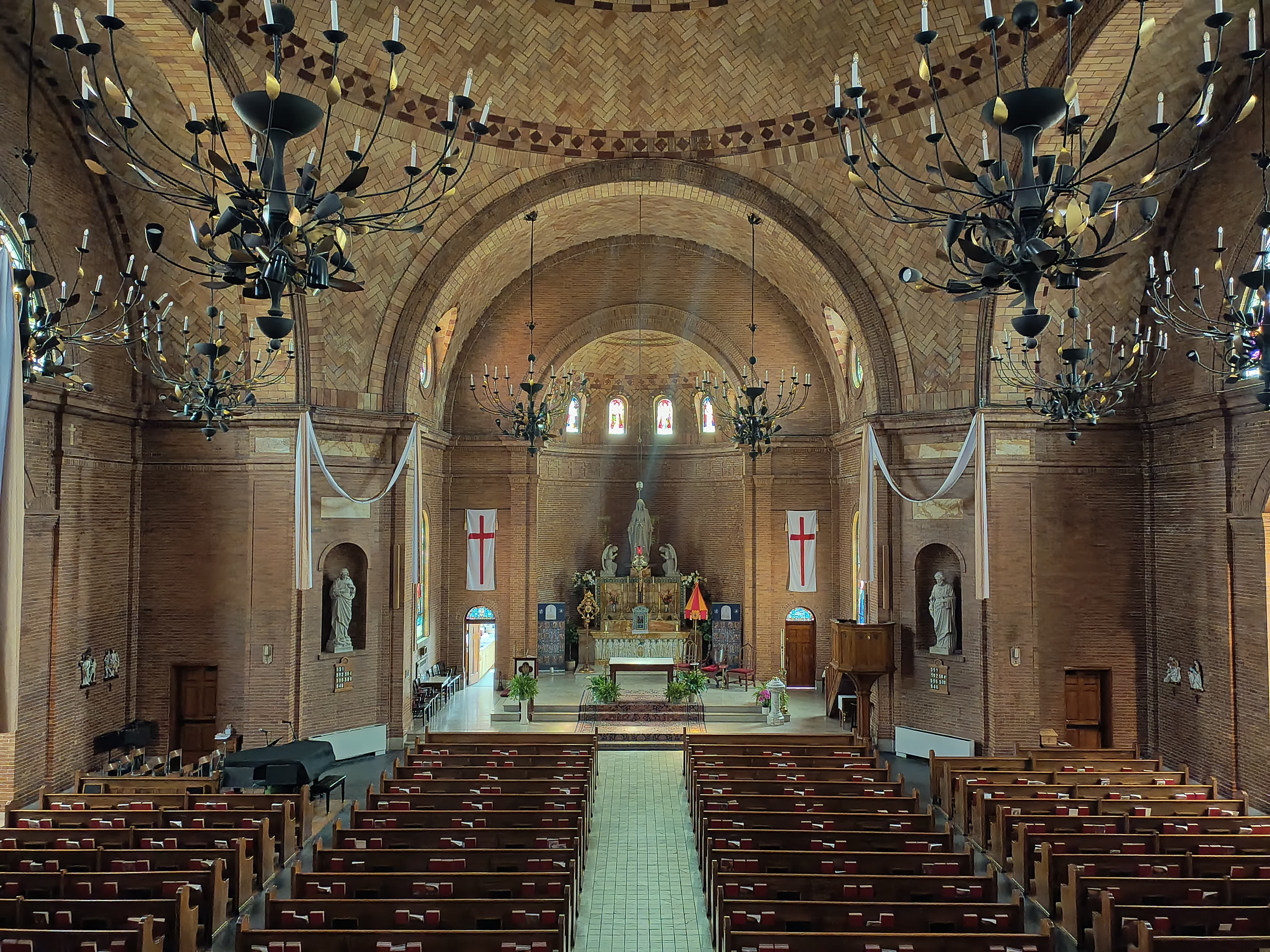
Interior of the basilica

St. Mary's is an example of Spanish Baroque architecture and is particularly significant for its use of the structural tile system associated with Rafael Guastavino. The National Register nomination describes the church as being constructed of brick and tile without structural steel or wooden beams and without nails.

The church has a cross-shaped plan, with a large dome over the crossing and barrel vaults above portions of the interior. Its principal façade is flanked by two tall towers capped by domed cupolas, while a broad Baroque gable marks the central entrance. The building rises from a rusticated granite base, and copper covers the principal dome and portions of the roof.

The principal dome is a self-supporting tiled structure based on the Guastavino tile system. Thin layers of terra-cotta tile were bonded together with mortar, producing lightweight but structurally rigid vaults. The National Register nomination specifically identifies the tiled, self-supporting dome as one of the church's significant architectural features.

St. Mary's is unusual among buildings associated with the Guastavino firm because the Guastavinos were responsible not only for the vault construction but also for the architectural design. The firm also designed interior elements including the altars and a terra-cotta frieze depicting the apostles.

The elder Rafael Guastavino was one of the principal developers and promoters of cohesive tile construction in the United States. Other North Carolina buildings associated with the Guastavino firm include the Basilica of St. Lawrence in Asheville, Duke University Chapel, and buildings in Greensboro and Chapel Hill.

=== Alterations and restoration ===
Side entrances were added to the church during the 1950s. The main entrance was also modified to accommodate a stained-glass representation of the Last Supper.

A major renovation was undertaken in 1988 during the pastorate of the Rev. Thomas Hadden, with Gerald Allen & Associates of New York serving as consulting architects. Work included cleaning and repair of the interior masonry, changes to the sanctuary, new marble flooring, refinishing the pews, laying slate floors in the aisles, installation of chandeliers and a new sound system, and renovation and enlargement of the organ.

The parish states that in 1994 the church was among the recipients of the American Institute of Architects' Religious Art and Architecture awards.

== Historic designation ==
St. Mary's stands within the Wilmington Historic District, which was listed on the National Register of Historic Places in 1974. The district's National Register nomination specifically identifies St. Mary's as one of Wilmington's architecturally notable public buildings, describing its Spanish Baroque design, tiled dome, brick-and-tile construction, and twin cupola-capped towers.

== St. Mary Catholic School ==
The parish operates St. Mary Catholic School, a Catholic school serving students from preschool through eighth grade.

The school's origins date to 1869, when Bishop James Gibbons invited the Sisters of Our Lady of Mercy from Charleston, South Carolina, to establish a Catholic school in Wilmington. Three sisters—Mother Augustine Kent, Sister Mary Charles Curtin, and Sister Mary Baptist Sheehan—opened the Academy of the Incarnation in the Benjamin Beery House at 202 Nun Street with 36 pupils.

In January 1871, the sisters established St. Peter's Parochial School for Girls for children from poorer families. The Academy of the Incarnation and the girls' parochial school were merged in 1888 as St. Mary's Female Parochial School.

Catholic education for boys began in 1872 with St. Thomas's Parochial School for Boys in the basement of St. Thomas the Apostle Church. A separate boys' school building was subsequently constructed near Fifth Avenue and Ann Street. It opened in 1878 with an enrollment of 50 boys. By 1888 the boys' and girls' institutions were being identified collectively as St. Mary's Parochial School.

The Sisters of Mercy remained associated with St. Mary School until 1991. A separate Catholic school serving Black students operated in Wilmington from the late nineteenth century; following diocesan desegregation in the 1960s, members of the Franciscan Handmaids of the Most Pure Heart of Mary joined the faculty at St. Mary's.

St. Mary School describes itself as the oldest Catholic school in North Carolina. The school was founded in 1869 and continues to operate on the parish campus.

== Tileston complex ==
Across Ann Street from the basilica is the historic Tileston school complex. The original Tileston school was established in the nineteenth century by educator Amy Morris Bradley and philanthropist Mary Tileston Hemenway and was used for public education in Wilmington for many decades.

After the city ceased using the buildings, St. Mary Parish acquired the Tileston complex in 1988 for $17,000 and restored it for parish and educational uses. The complex now contains parish offices, school facilities, meeting rooms, and the Sister Isaac Center, the parish's social-outreach ministry.

== Notable events ==
Mother Teresa visited St. Mary parish and school in 1975.

== See also ==
- Catholic Church in the United States
- List of Catholic basilicas
- List of Catholic cathedrals in the United States
- Rafael Guastavino
- Guastavino tile
