= William B. Gould =

American enslaved person, Civil War veteran and diarist

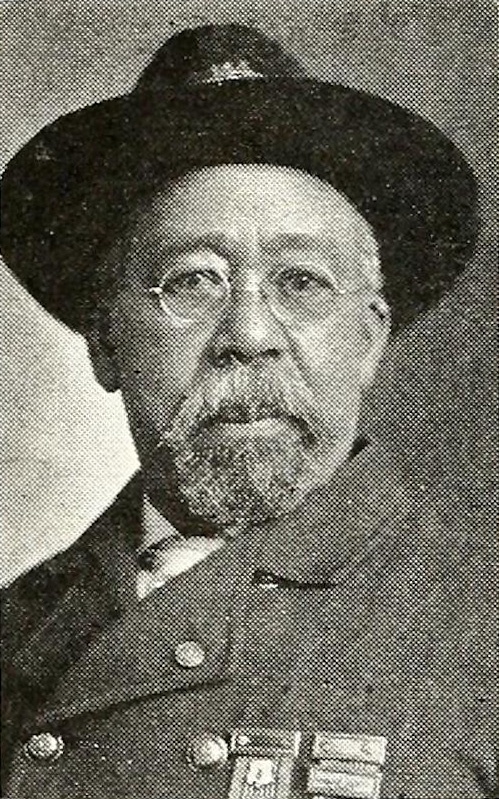
William B. Gould

William Benjamin Gould Sr. (November 18, 1837 – May 25, 1923) was a former enslaved person and veteran of the American Civil War, serving in the U.S. Navy. His diary is one of only a few written during the Civil War by a formerly enslaved person that has survived, and the only one by a formerly enslaved sailor. The story of his life has been chronicled by his great-grandson in his book Diary of a Contraband: The Civil War Passage of a Black Sailor (2002) which annotates the diary and includes five additional chapters on the life and accomplishments of Gould.

== Early life ==
William B. Gould was born in Wilmington, North Carolina, on November 18, 1837, to an enslaved woman, Elizabeth "Betsy" Moore, (Note: Moore died March 13, 1865, just before the liberation of Wilmington.) and Alexander Gould, an English-born resident of Granville County, NC. He was enslaved by Nicholas Nixon, a peanut planter who owned a large plantation on Porters Neck and at Rocky Point. Gould learned masonry. Nixon hired him out to construction and renovation projects around the Wilmington area. His carved initials can be seen in the plaster of the antebellum Bellamy Mansion in Wilmington. Other projects he worked on remain unidentified.

The outbreak of the Civil War brought danger to Wilmington in the form of crime, disease, threat of invasion, and "downright bawdiness." This prompted many slave owners to move inland, resulting in less supervision over those they were enslaving. During a rainy night on September 21, 1862, Gould escaped with seven other enslaved men (Note: They included George W. Price, Joseph Hall, Andrew Hall, John Mackey, Charles Gile, John Mitchell, and William Chance.) by rowing a small boat 28 nautical miles (52 km) down the Cape Fear River. They embarked on Orange Street, just four blocks from where Gould lived on Chestnut St. (Note: Nixon's slave quarters were on Chestnut Street in Wilmington, between Third and Fourth Streets.) Sentries were posted along the river, adding additional danger. The boat had a sail, but they did not raise it until they were out in the Atlantic for fear of being seen.

Just as the dawn was breaking on September 22, they rushed out into the Atlantic Ocean near Fort Caswell and hoisted their sail. There, the USS Cambridge of the Union blockade picked them up as contraband. Other ships in the blockade picked up two other boats containing friends of Gould in what may have been a coordinated effort. (Note: They include Virgil Richardson and Ben Greer, who were picked up by the USS Penobscot, and Thomas Cowan, Charles Mallet, and Frank Clinton, who were rescued by the USS Monticello.) Though Gould had no way of knowing it, within an hour and a half of his rescue President Abraham Lincoln convened a meeting of his cabinet to finalize plans to issue the Emancipation Proclamation.

During the war, his home was burned and with it a family Bible. His birthday was inscribed in that Bible but that was the only record of his birth.

== Naval service ==
There had been some concern about the numbers of slaves who were escaping and making it to Union ships before Gould's escape. One captain had written to the Navy Department asking what was to be done with them as they did not have room for the extra men. William A. Parker, the captain of the Cambridge, however, had written to Acting Rear Admiral Samuel Phillips Lee just five days before picking up Gould that his ship was short 18 men due to desertions and sickness. As a result, he said, he intended to fill the vacancies with escaped slaves.

After his boarding the Cambridge, Gould notes that he was "kindly received by officers and men." In his diary he noted that on October 3, 1862, he took "the Oath of Allegiance to the Government of Uncle Samuel." Upon joining the U.S. Navy on board the Cambridge, he was given the rank of First Class Boy. At the time, boy was the highest rank a black sailor could earn. He was later promoted to landsman and then ward room steward, making him a petty officer but without the authority that came as an officer of the line.

The Cambridge was part of the Atlantic Blockading Squadron, enforcing the blockade of the Confederate coastline. Gould found the work to be difficult and lonely, recording after just three months on the ship that all the men had the blues. Still, Gould believed he was "defending the holiest of all causes, Liberty and Union." During his service he saw combat and chased Confederate ships across the Atlantic Ocean to Europe. In a span of five days, the Cambridge and two other ships were able to capture four blockade runners and chase a fifth to shore.

Gould also served on the USS Ohio. While on board of the Ohio, he came down with the measles and had to leave the ship to go to the hospital. His time in the hospital, from May to October 1863, is the only time he broke from his habit of writing in his diary. During this time he was visited by one of his maternal cousins, a Jones, who was the child of emancipated slaves who moved north for fear of being re-enslaved.

In October 1863, after he was recovered, Gould was transferred to the USS Niagara. The ship was in port in Gloucester, Massachusetts, waiting for a full complement of men. On December 10, it unexpectedly left port and raced up the eastern seaboard to Nova Scotia chasing after the Chesapeake. The Chesapeake had been captured off the coast of Cape Cod by Confederate sympathizers from the Maritime Provinces.

From June 1, 1864, until well into 1865, Gould and the Niagara sailed to and around Europe, searching for Confederate ships. The Niagara was involved in two major confrontations while in Europe, including the taking of the CSS Georgia. It stalked the CSS Stonewall along the coasts of Spain and Portugal, but declined to fight the armored ship and let it get away. It was also on the hunt for the CSS Alabama, the CSS Florida, the CSS Shenandoah, and the Laurel, but they did not find them.

While off the coast of Cadiz, Spain, those on board the Niagara learned of the surrender of the Confederate Army. "I heard the Glad Tidings that the Stars and Stripes had been planted over the Capital of the D--nd Confederacy by the invincible Grant," Gould committed to his diary. Not knowing that it signaled the end of the war, the Niagara set sail again, this time searching for Confederate ships in Queenstown, Ireland. The Irish came out in great numbers to see the American warship. Leaving Ireland, the Niagara sailed to Charlestown, Massachusetts, where Gould received an honorable discharge after three years of service in the United States Navy.

During his first leave from the ship in the spring of 1863, Gould visited Mary Moore Jones, his maternal aunt, in Boston and then his eventual wife, Cornelia Read, on Nantucket. There were a number of other women (Note: Including Ann E. Hoagland of Brooklyn, Matilda Culbreth of Brooklyn, and "Mrs. White.") that he visited in New York during leaves as well. Gould had an active social life during leaves, attending concerts, lectures, and public meetings. During his time in New York he also met William McLaurin, a future North Carolina state representative.

Though black men served alongside white men in the Navy during the Civil War and made up roughly 15% of the Union Navy, Gould experienced racism while serving on board the USS Cambridge. He recorded the relative racial equality he observed in the Navy, while also highlighting the persistent slights and occasional instances of overt discrimination experienced by Black sailors. Black soldiers from a Maryland regiment who had been taken aboard temporarily were "treated shamefully," Gould said, when they were not allowed to eat out of mess pans and were called disparaging names. The incident seemed to be out of the ordinary, suggesting that it was not common while serving.

== Post-war life ==
=== Career ===
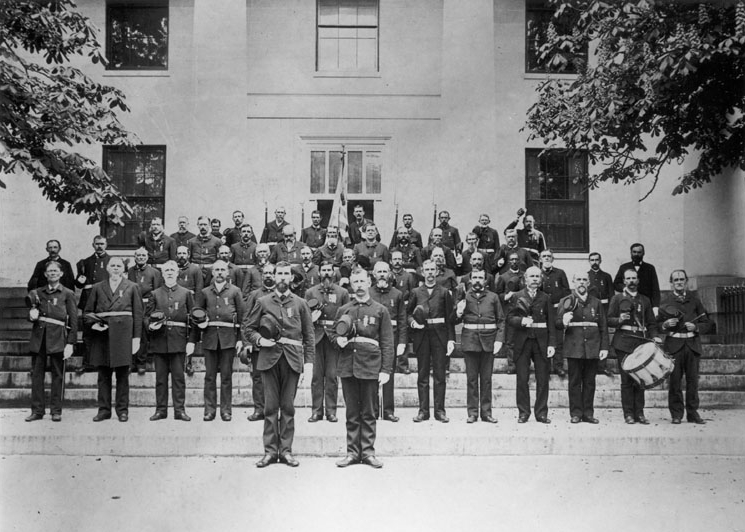
William Gould with the GAR on Dedham's 250th anniversary.

Gould visited Wilmington after the war, perhaps in October 1865, and found it to be largely deserted, very unlike the bustling city he knew before the war. He found it to be an improvement, however, where many of the trappings of the former slave economy had been removed.

Gould married in 1865 and spent his first year as a married man working as a plasterer on Nantucket. After living in New Hampshire and in Taunton, Massachusetts, for a time, in 1871 the Goulds moved to 303-307 Milton Street in Dedham, Massachusetts. In Dedham, Gould became a building contractor and pillar of the community. Gould "took great pride in his work" as a plasterer and brick mason. His skill was rewarded with contracts for public buildings, including several schools.

He helped to build the new St. Mary's Church in his adopted hometown of Dedham. While working on the church, one of his employees improperly mixed the plaster. Even though it was not visible by looking at it and though the defect would not be discovered for some time, Gould insisted that it be removed and reapplied correctly. The decision nearly bankrupted him, but it helped cement his reputation in the town. He also worked as a stonemason, constructing buildings around Dedham.

He later took the minutes of the Hancock Mutual Relief Association.

=== Social and civic life ===
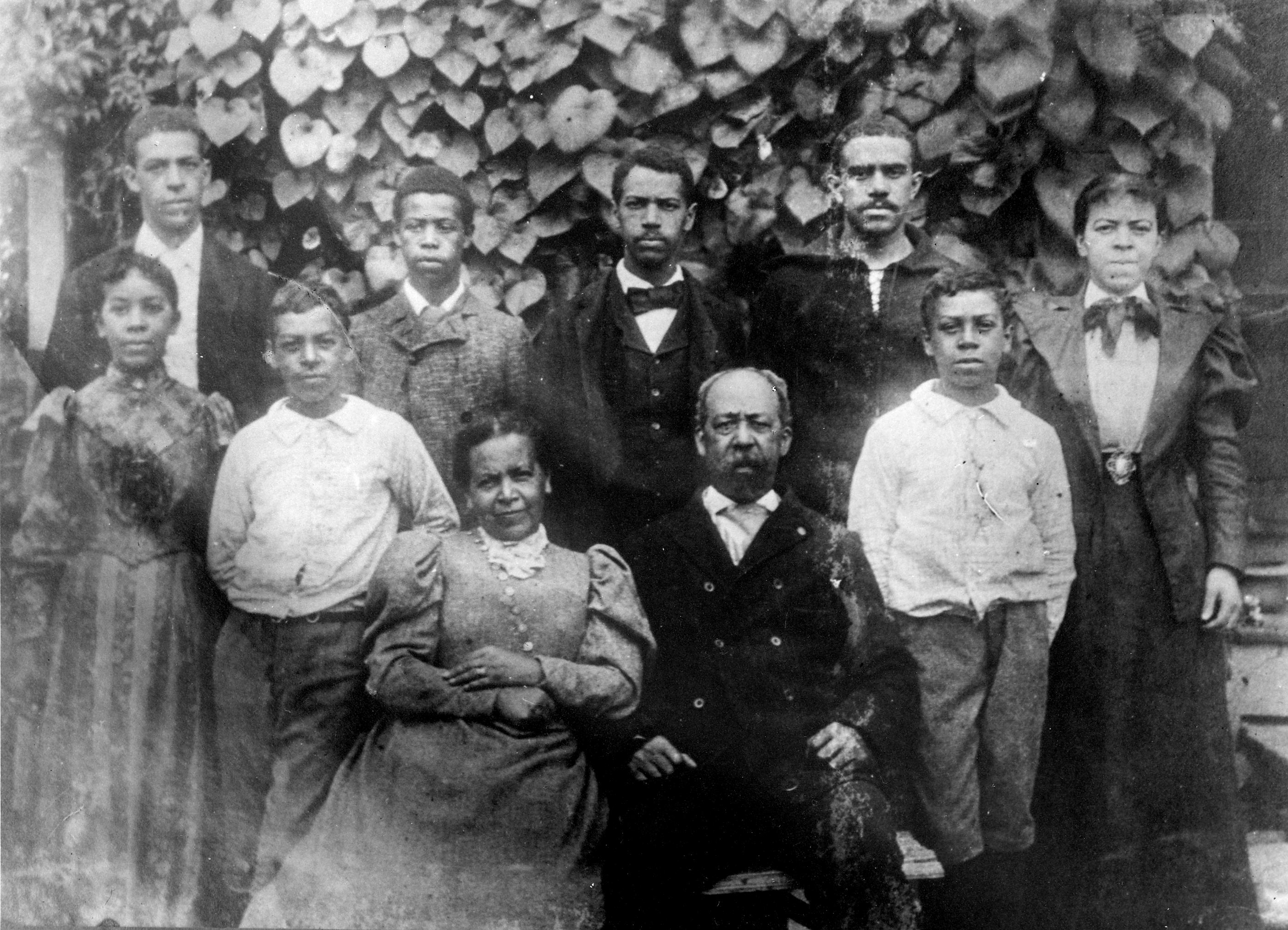
William and Cornelia Gould with their children.

Shortly before he got sick with the measles, Gould met John Robert Bond, another black sailor serving on the Ohio. The Gould home was close to the border with Readville, where Bond settled after the war. (Note: Also nearby was James M. Trotter, a black officer of the 54th Massachusetts Volunteer Infantry Regiment.) The two would reconnect ten years after the war and become good friends. Gould would later serve as godfather to Bond's second son.

Gould helped to build the Episcopal Church of the Good Shepard in Oakdale Square, though as a parishioner and not as a contractor. He and his wife were baptized and confirmed there in 1878 and 1879. (Note: Four generations of Goulds would ultimately be baptized there.) As a signer of the Articles of Incorporation, he was one of its founders. Gould's family remained active members of the church and, along with the Bonds and one other family, the Chesnuts, were the only black parishioners. There was only one other black family in Dedham at the time. Gould and his family were more likely to experience subtle slights on account of their race as opposed to outright racism while living in Dedham.

Gould was extremely active in the Charles W. Carroll (Note: Charles Whiting Carroll was born in Dedham on May 30, 1836, was fitted for college in the Dedham High School. He was graduated at Dartmouth College with the class of 1859 and was a member of the Suffolk Bar. He was commissioned 1st Lieut of Company F on July 26, 1861 and Captain October 29, 1861. In the charge at Bull Run, Carroll acted as Lieut Colonel of the regiment. While retiring from the field and bringing up the rear of the regiment, he was struck by a ball near the shoulder blade which probably penetrated the spinal column as he was rendered helpless and, in the confusion of retreat, was left behind. His friend, Adjt Baker, two days after succeeded in passing the rebel lines under a flag of truce and found him where he had fallen and in a state of suffering although he had not been wholly uncared for by the enemy. The next day, a carriage was sent to bring him within the Union lines but he died two hours before it reached its destination. He was decently buried on the field but the remains were subsequently brought home and buried with solemn rites.) Post 144 of the Grand Army of the Republic (GAR). He "held virtually every position that it was possible to hold in the GAR from the time he joined [in 1882] until his death in 1923, including the highest post, commander, in 1900 and 1901." He attended the statewide encampments of the GAR in the late 19th and early 20th centuries with Bond and other black veterans from the area. He also joined the Mt. Moriah Masonic Prince Hall Lodge in Cambridge with several other black veterans. In 1911, Gould was interviewed by the local veteran's association about his wartime experiences.

By 1886, Gould would earn enough esteem in the community to be appointed to the General Staff and to lead the parade held in honor of Dedham's 250th anniversary. Gould gave a speech at Dedham's 1918 Decoration Day celebrations at which he received "an ovation welcome." He also regularly spoke to school children on Memorial Day and presided over the town's celebrations of the holiday. Gould was driven through town on parade days into the 1920s in cars adorned with red, white, and blue decorations.

Gould was a committed Republican, as were his children. He adamantly opposed the notion that newly emancipated blacks should be repatriated to Africa or Haiti, saying they had been born under the American flag and would know no other.

=== Family ===
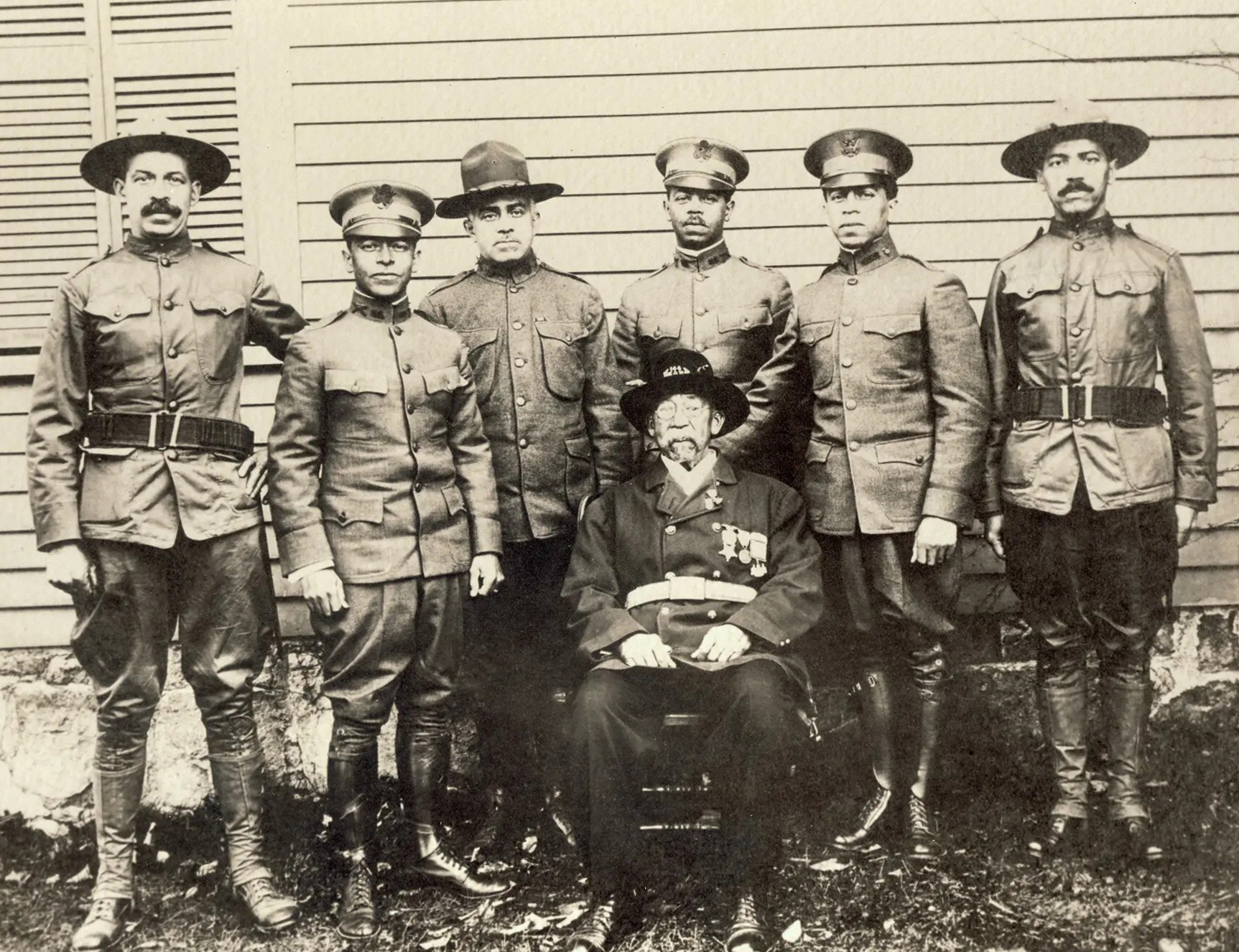
Gould and his six sons in military uniforms

After he was discharged from the Navy on September 29, 1865 at the Charlestown Navy Yard in Massachusetts, Gould considered moving back to North Carolina where he believed he would have "a fair chance of success [in] my business". Instead, he immediately went to Nantucket where he married Cornelia Williams Read, (Note: Not much is known about Read. She was born in Charleston, South Carolina on May 30, 1837. Her last owner was John Newland Maffitt, a naval officer and Confederate privateer, who later commanded the CSS Florida while Gould was chasing it. When Maffitt put Read and her mother up for sale, Read's uncle, Rev. James E. Crawford, raised $1,000 to purchase Read and $700 to purchase her mother. Crawford was alerted to the sale by another of Read's uncles, Henry Highland Garnet. During the trip north, Read was not allowed to sit in the first class car with the other passengers but was placed in the baggage car. She arrived in New Bedford, Massachusetts, by February 1858 and Nantucket shortly thereafter. She died in 1906.) on November 22, 1865, at the African Baptist Church on Nantucket. Rev. James E. Crawford, Read's uncle, officiated. Gould had known Read since childhood, and she was his most frequent wartime correspondent. Cornelia, who had been purchased out of slavery, was then living on Nantucket.

Their oldest daughter, Medora Williams, was born on Nantucket, and their oldest son, William B. Gould Jr., was born in Taunton. The rest, Fredrick Crawford, Luetta Ball, Lawrence Wheeler, Herbert Richardson, and twins James Edward and Ernest Moore, were all born in Dedham.

The 1880 United States census lists a boy with the last name of Mabson living with the Goulds and working as an employee of Gould's. The child is almost certainly the son of one of Gould's nephews through his sister Eliza, George Lawrence Mabson or William Mabson.

Five of his sons would fight in World War I and one in the Spanish–American War. A photo of the six sons and their father, all in military uniform, would appear in the NAACP's magazine, The Crisis, in December 1917. The three youngest sons, all officers, were training to go and fight in World War I in France. Gould's great-grandson would describe them as "a family of fighters."

== Literacy ==
It is unknown how Gould learned to read and write, as in much of the South it was illegal to teach those skills to the enslaved. However, it is clear that he was educated and able to express himself elegantly. In his diary, Gould quoted Shakespeare, had some knowledge of French, and knew a handful of Spanish expressions. It is possible that he was educated in the Front Street Methodist Church near Nixon's slave quarters, or at St. John's Episcopal Church.

During stops in New York while in the Navy, Gould frequently visited the offices of The Anglo-African, an abolitionist newspaper. Gould raised funds for the publication, become an avid reader, and serve as a correspondent under the pen name "Oley." While on board the Niagara, Gould often corresponded with Robert Hamilton, the publisher.

During the war, Gould sent and received a large number of letters. None of them survive, but each is noted in his diary. They include family, friends, former shipmates, other contraband, and acquaintances in North Carolina, New York, Massachusetts. He corresponds frequently with George W. Price who escaped with him, and with Abraham Galloway, both of whom served in the North Carolina General Assembly after the war. He most frequently writes to his eventual wife, Cornelia Read, and they exchange at least 60 letters during the war. Cornelia attended school after she moved to Nantucket; it is unclear whether she knew how to read and write prior.

=== Diary ===
Beginning with his time on the Cambridge and continuing through his discharge at the end of the war, Gould kept a diary of his day-to-day activities. According to John Hope Franklin, Gould's diary is one of three known diaries in existence written during the Civil War by former slaves, and the only one by a Union sailor. It is a "wealth of information about what it was like to be an African American in the Union Navy."

The diary begins on September 27, 1862, five days after boarding the Cambridge, and runs until his discharge on September 29, 1865. There is a section missing, which included the dates of September 1863 to February 1864. It consists of two books plus 40 unbound pages. It is thought that some sections of the diary, which would cover late 1864 and early 1865, have been destroyed.

In the diary, Gould chronicles his trips to the northeastern United States, the Netherlands, Belgium, Spain, Portugal, and England. The diary is distinguished not only by its details and eloquent tone, but also by its author's reflections on the conduct of the war, his own military engagements, race, race relations in the Navy, and what African Americans might expect after the war and during the Reconstruction Era.

== Legacy ==
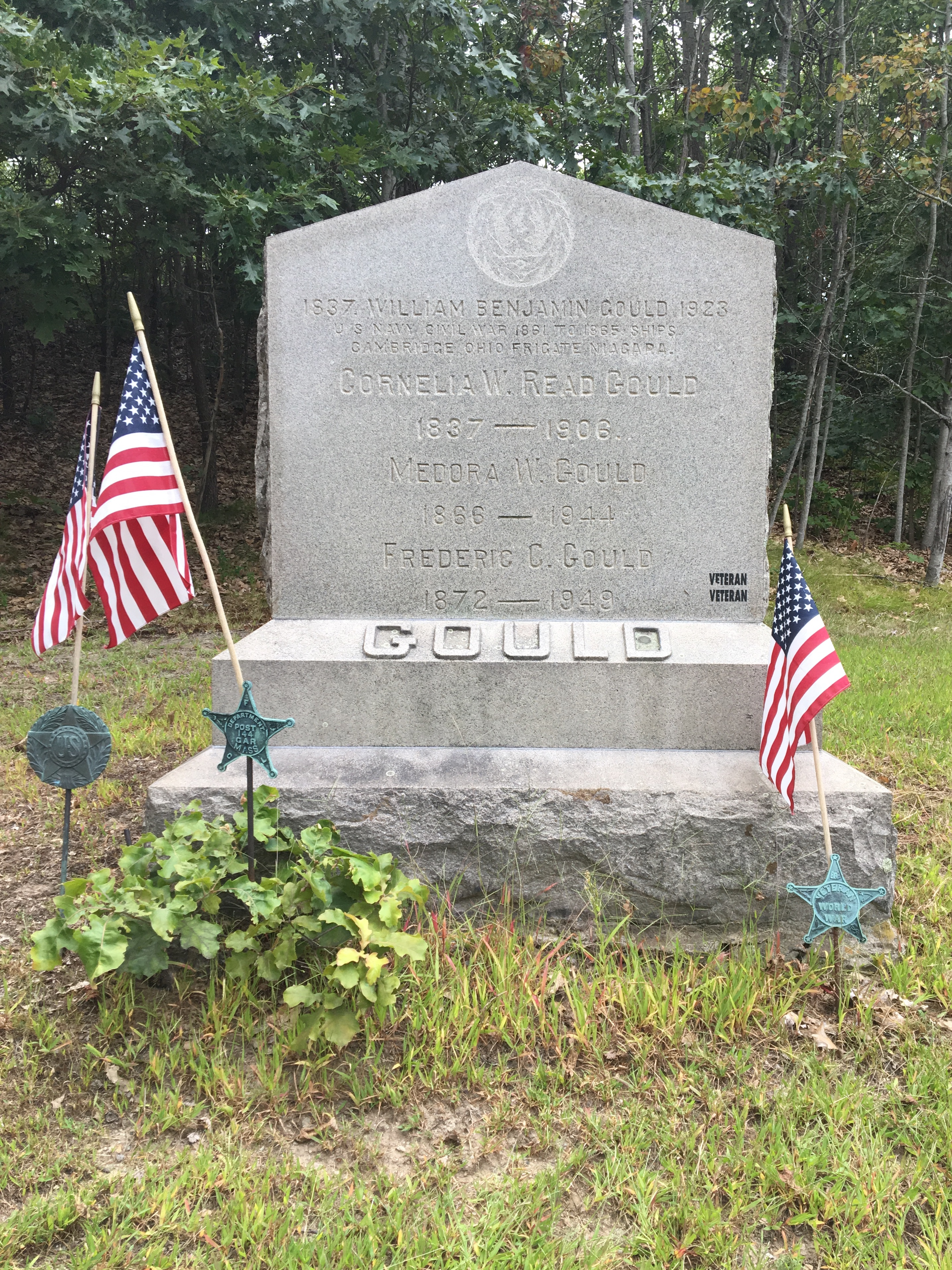
Gould's gravestone at Brookdale Cemetery

Gould died on May 25, 1923, at the age of 85 and was interred at Brookdale Cemetery in Dedham. The Dedham Transcript reported his death under the headline "East Dedham Mourns Faithful Soldier and Always Loyal Citizen: Death Came Very Suddenly to William B. Gould, Veteran of the Civil War."

The New York Times published an obituary about Gould on June 17, 2022, as part of "Overlooked", "a series of obituaries about remarkable people whose deaths, beginning in 1851, went unreported in The Times."

A pew at the Church of the Good Shepherd is dedicated to Gould and Cornelia. Gould's story is now taught as part of the Dedham Public Schools curriculum.

On July 13, 2023, 30 members of Congress wrote a letter to Secretary of the Navy Carlos Del Toro, requesting that a ship be named in Gould's honor. They suggested that a Arleigh Burke-class destroyer, which are named for naval veterans, or a John Lewis-class replenishment oiler, which are named for those who advanced civil rights, would be an appropriate choice. On June 14, 2024, the House of Representatives as a whole voted to direct the Secretary to name a ship for Gould as part of the National Defense Authorization Act.

=== Diary of a Contraband ===
Gould's diary was discovered 35 years after his death, in 1958, when his attic was being cleaned out. His grandson, William B. Gould III, showed it to his son, William B. Gould IV. At the time, they had known that Gould served in the Navy during the Civil War, but not if he had been enslaved or free prior to his service.

Gould IV began researching his ancestor's life, a process that would last more than 50 years. While teaching at Harvard in the 1970s, Gould IV researched his namesake's life in nearby Dedham. When he served as the chairman of the National Labor Relations Board under President Bill Clinton in the 1990s, he searched the National Archives. It was only in 1989 that Gould IV discovered his ancestor had been enslaved prior to the war. Gould IV found a notation in the log of the Cambridge that noted Gould had been picked up as contraband and listed the name of his enslaver.

Gould IV went on to edit his great-grandfather's diary and publish it as a book titled Diary of a Contraband: The Civil War Passage of a Black Sailor while Charles A. Beardsley Professor of Law Emeritus at Stanford Law School. (Note: Much is known about his life from the pension applications he made to the Department of the Interior in 1888, 1912, 1913, and 1915.) He donated the original diary to the Massachusetts Historical Society in 2006. The foreword to the published edition was written by United States Senator Mark O. Hatfield. According to Hatfield, Gould's "outstanding life, in Dedham, Massachusetts, following the war, exemplifies American citizenship at its best--citizenship that burned brightly because our nation transcended the inhumanity of slavery."

Gould's diary was featured on the July 3, 2001, edition of Nightline. In 2020, the Episcopal Diocese of Massachusetts donated copies of the book to local schools and libraries.

=== Park and statue ===
On November 9, 2020, the Town of Dedham renamed a 1.3 acre park as the William B. Gould Memorial Park. The park on Mother Brook is about 0.5 miles from Gould's home on Milton Street. The park was formally dedicated on September 23, 2021, before a crowd of more than 100.

At the dedication, a sign with Gould's name and image was unveiled by his great-great-great-grandchildren and then blessed by the former rector of the Church of the Good Shepherd. A committee was established to erect a sculpture of him on the site by Memorial Day 2023, the 100th anniversary of Gould's death. The names of four finalists, all artists of color, were announced at the dedication. The commission ultimately went to Pablo Eduardo.

On May 28, 2023, the statue was unveiled before a crowd of hundreds by Timothy, Alina, and William B. Gould VI, three of Gould's great-great-great-grandchildren. (Note: When the black cloth covering the statue got caught on the statue's head, two of the reenactors from the Massachusetts 54th helped remove it with their bayonets.) The ceremony took place a few days after the 100th anniversary of Gould's death.

The ceremony included the 54th Massachusetts Infantry Regiment reenactors who posted the colors before the national anthem was performed by students from the Dedham Public Schools. The 54th also fired a volley salute after the statue was unveiled. The statue was blessed by Rev. Chitral De Mel, the rector of the Church of the Good Shepherd, and an opening prayer was offered by Rev. Wayne Belschner of St. Mary's.

Tera Hunter of Princeton University gave the keynote address in which she put Gould's service in the Navy and his time in Dedham in the context of the Civil War and the political and social changes in the United States during this period. Gould's great-grandson, William B. Gould IV, gave remarks and was presented with a scale model maquette of the statue during the ceremony. The master of ceremonies was Joe Castiglione and Eduardo also spoke.

The statue portrays Gould as an older man, as he would have been known to the people of Dedham. His hands are slightly enlarged and his posture is slightly stiff, demonstrating that he worked hard jobs his entire life. It includes the coat he wore as Commander of the Carrol Post of the Grand Army of the Republic, and a toolbox with symbolic tools he used in his life such as a compass, a trowel, and a pen. A copy of his diary sits open on his lap.

The bronze was poured at the Somerset Foundry in Bath, Maine. Inside the statue is a time capsule built by students at Blue Hills Regional Technical School that holds more than 30 items, including a COVID-19 pandemic-era face mask, a list of slang words, and a copy of the Town charter. (Note: The capsule was built by seniors Paul McCann and Nathan Finn.) The time capsule is scheduled to be opened in 100 years.

== Works cited ==
- Alexander, Adele Logan (July 2000). Homelands and Waterways: The American Journey of the Bond Family, 1846-1926 (Amazon Kindle ed.). Knopf Doubleday Publishing Group. ISBN 978-0-307-42625-3.
- Worthington, Erastus (1869). Dedication of the Memorial Hall, in Dedham, September 29, 1868: With an Appendix. John Cox, Jr.
- Gould IV, William B. (2002). Diary of a Contraband: The Civil War Passage of a Black Sailor (paperback ed.). Stanford University Press. ISBN 0-8047-4708-3.
