= Temple of Israel (Wilmington, North Carolina) =

Reform synagogue in North Carolina, US

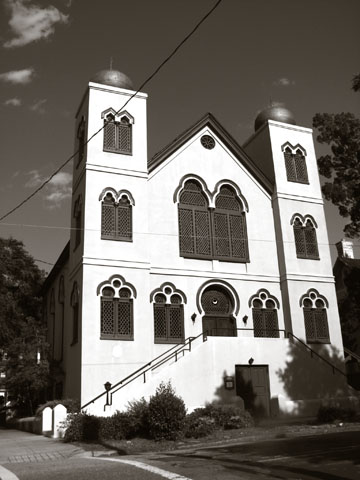
- Temple of Israel façade

- Location in North Carolina

Religion
- Affiliation: Reform Judaism
- Ecclesiastical or organisational status: Synagogue
- Leadership: Rabbi Ben Shull
- Year consecrated: May 12, 1876
- Status: Active

Location
- Location: 1 South Fourth Street, Wilmington, North Carolina 28401
- Country: United States
- Coordinates: 34°14′08″N 77°56′40″W

Architecture
- Architect: Samuel Sloan
- Type: Synagogue
- Style: Greek Revival; Moorish Revival
- Established: 1872 (as a congregation)
- Completed: 1876

Specifications
- Dome: Two
- Materials: Masonry; stucco

Website
- temple-of-israel.org

The Temple of Israel is a Reform Jewish synagogue located on the corner of Fourth and Market Streets in Wilmington, North Carolina, in the United States. Built in 1876, the Temple of Israel is the oldest synagogue in North Carolina and one of the earliest Reform synagogues in the American South.

== History ==
Sephardic Jews first arrived in North Carolina during the early 18th century. By 1852, a Jewish Burial Society was formed in Wilmington with a Hebrew cemetery opening in 1855. An Orthodox Jewish congregation was formed in 1867, but did not succeed. In 1872, a Reform congregation was started by German Jews and their synagogue, the Temple of Israel, was dedicated on May 12, 1876.

== Architecture ==
Designed by Samuel Sloan, the synagogue is a combination of Greek Revival and Moorish Revival styles. The Moorish architecture is unique in the city of Wilmington, but was common during late 19th century for many American synagogues. The synagogue features horseshoe arches and twin towers topped with golden onion domes. The building's exterior was restored in 1982, 2000 and 2013. It is a contributing building in the Wilmington Historic District.

== Notable members ==
- Arthur Bluethenthal (1891–1918), Princeton All American football player and World War I pilot
