= Saint Thomas Preservation Hall =

Former Catholic church in North Carolina, United States

Coordinates: 34°14′3″N 77°56′48″W

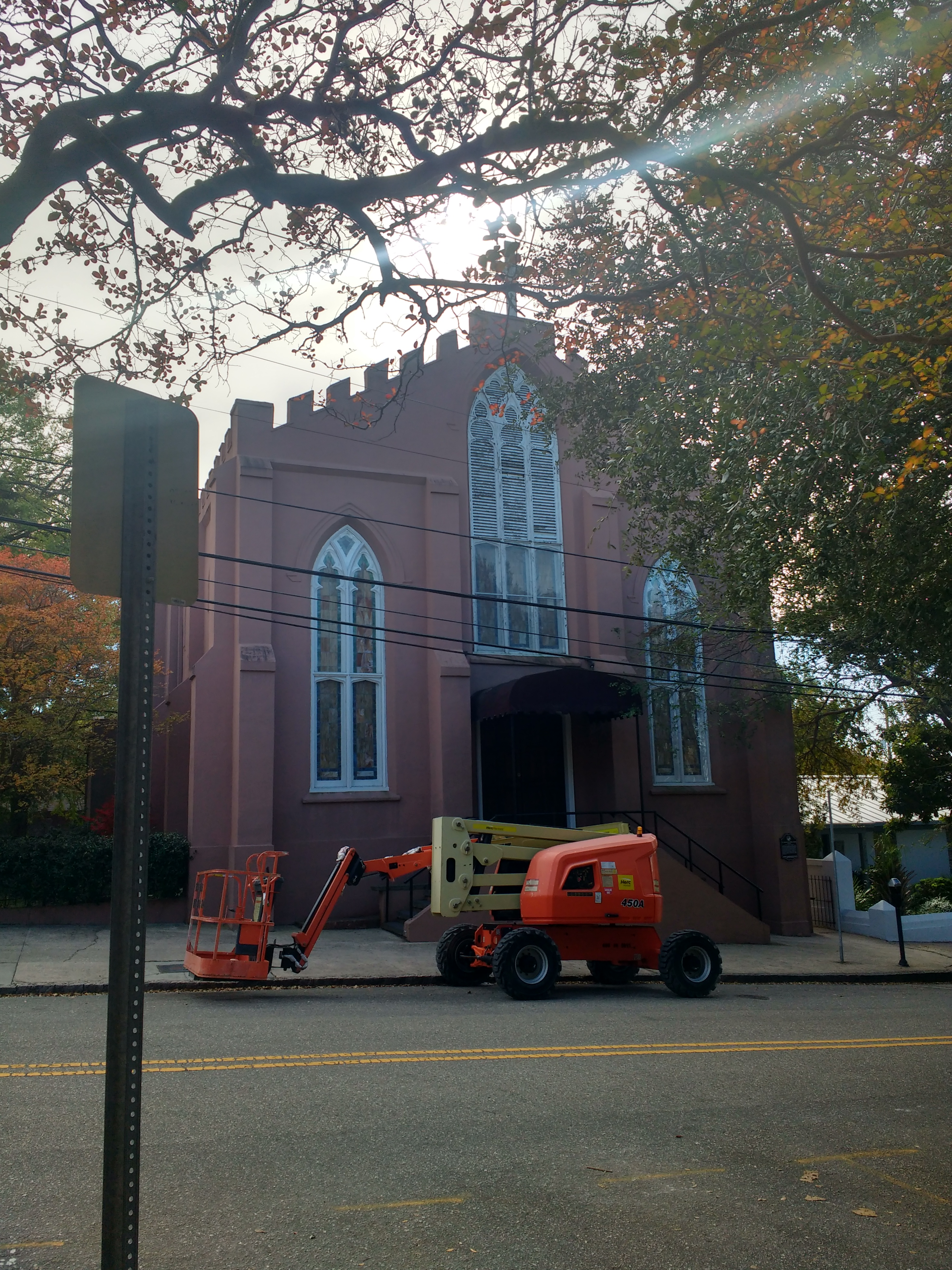
Saint Thomas Preservation Hall, in downtown Wilmington, North Carolina.

Saint Thomas Preservation Hall is a historic former Catholic church and Gothic Revival style building located in downtown Wilmington, North Carolina. It is currently a wedding and arts venue.

== St. Thomas the Apostle Catholic Church ==
Constructed in 1846 by Robert B. Wood, St Thomas the Apostle served a small but growing parish of Catholics in New Hanover County. The church's construction and parish was overlooked by Fr Thomas Murphy. The church later became the pro-Cathedral of North Carolina when Fr James Gibbons was consecrated as the vicar apostolic.

In 1908, the parish bought land at South Fifth Street and Ann, where the Basilica Shrine of St Mary would later be completed in 1912, which allowed the growing parish more space. Fr Christopher Dennen, an Irish priest, convinced the parish to keep the church as a place of congregation for the Black Catholics in the area. With a donation from Mother Katharine Drexel of $12,000, this was made possible. The Josephites staffed the parish for many years thereafter, beginning in 1911 to 1966.

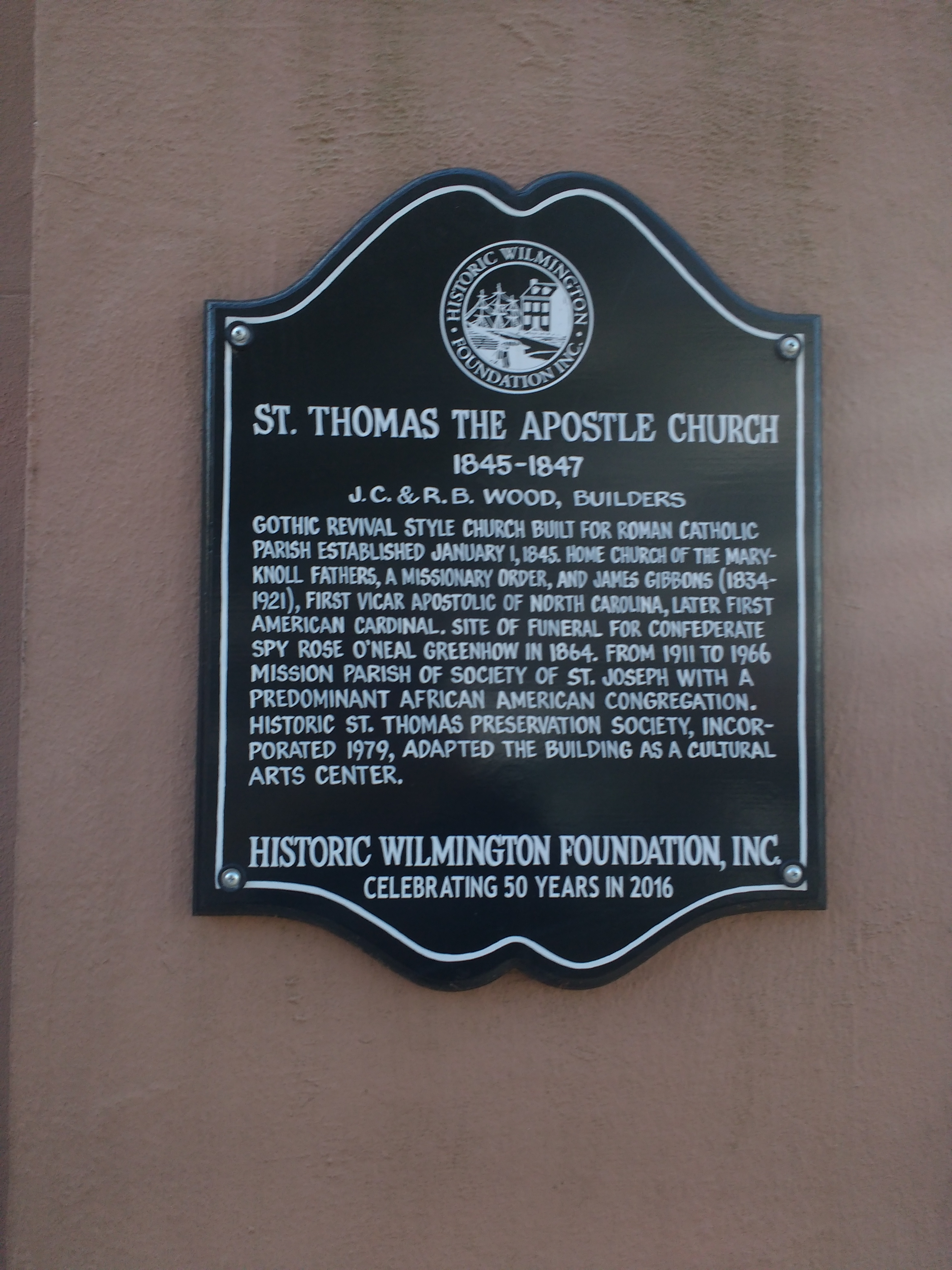
St Thomas the Apostle Church Plaque

After a fire in 1966, the St Mary's and St Thomas parishes decided to desegregate, leaving the St Thomas Church unneeded. The church formally deconsecrated in 1979, and in 1982 the Saint Thomas Historical Trust became the official owner of the title.

Now it operates as a wedding and arts venue, and underwent a large renovation in 2004.

== Notable people ==
- Thomas Frederick Price, a Maryknoll ordained at St. Thomas. Price was the first native North Carolinian to be ordained into the priesthood.
- Rose O'Neal Greenhow, famous Confederate spy. Her funeral Mass was held at St Thomas before she was laid to rest in Oakdale Cemetery.
- Caterina Jarboro, Black opera singer who was baptized at the parish.
