= William B. Gould IV =

American lawyer (born 1936)

Chair of the National Labor Relations Board
- In office March 7, 1994 – August 27, 1998
- President: Bill Clinton
- Preceded by: James M. Stephens
- Succeeded by: John C. Truesdale

Member of the National Labor Relations Board
- In office March 7, 1994 – August 27, 1998

Personal details
- Born: William Benjamin Gould IV; July 16, 1936 (age 90) Boston, Massachusetts, U.S.
- Party: Democratic
- Spouse: Hilda
- Children: 3
- Relatives: William B. Gould (great-grandfather)
- Education: University of Rhode Island; Cornell Law School

William Benjamin Gould IV (born July 16, 1936) is an American lawyer who is currently the Charles A. Beardsley Professor of Law, Emeritus at Stanford Law School. Gould was the first black professor at Stanford Law School.

Gould was born on July 16, 1936, in Boston, Massachusetts to William B. Gould III and Leah F. Gould. He grew up in Long Branch, New Jersey. Gould attended the University of Rhode Island and then Cornell Law School. An Episcopalian, he was baptized at the Church of the Good Shepherd in Dedham, Massachusetts and confirmed at St. James in Long Branch.

He also served as the Chairman of the National Labor Relations Board from 1994 to 1998. In this position, he helped to negotiate then end of the 1994–95 Major League Baseball strike.

He was responsible for the publication of the diary of his great-grandfather William B. Gould, an escaped slave who served in the Union Navy during the United States Civil War. With his wife, Hilda, he has three sons, William V, Timothy, and Edward.

== Works cited ==
- Gould IV, William B. (2002). Diary of a Contraband: The Civil War Passage of a Black Sailor (paperback ed.). Stanford University Press. ISBN 0-8047-4708-3.
