= Thalian Hall =

- Thalian Hall (City Hall)
- U.S. National Register of Historic Places
- U.S. Historic district – Contributing property
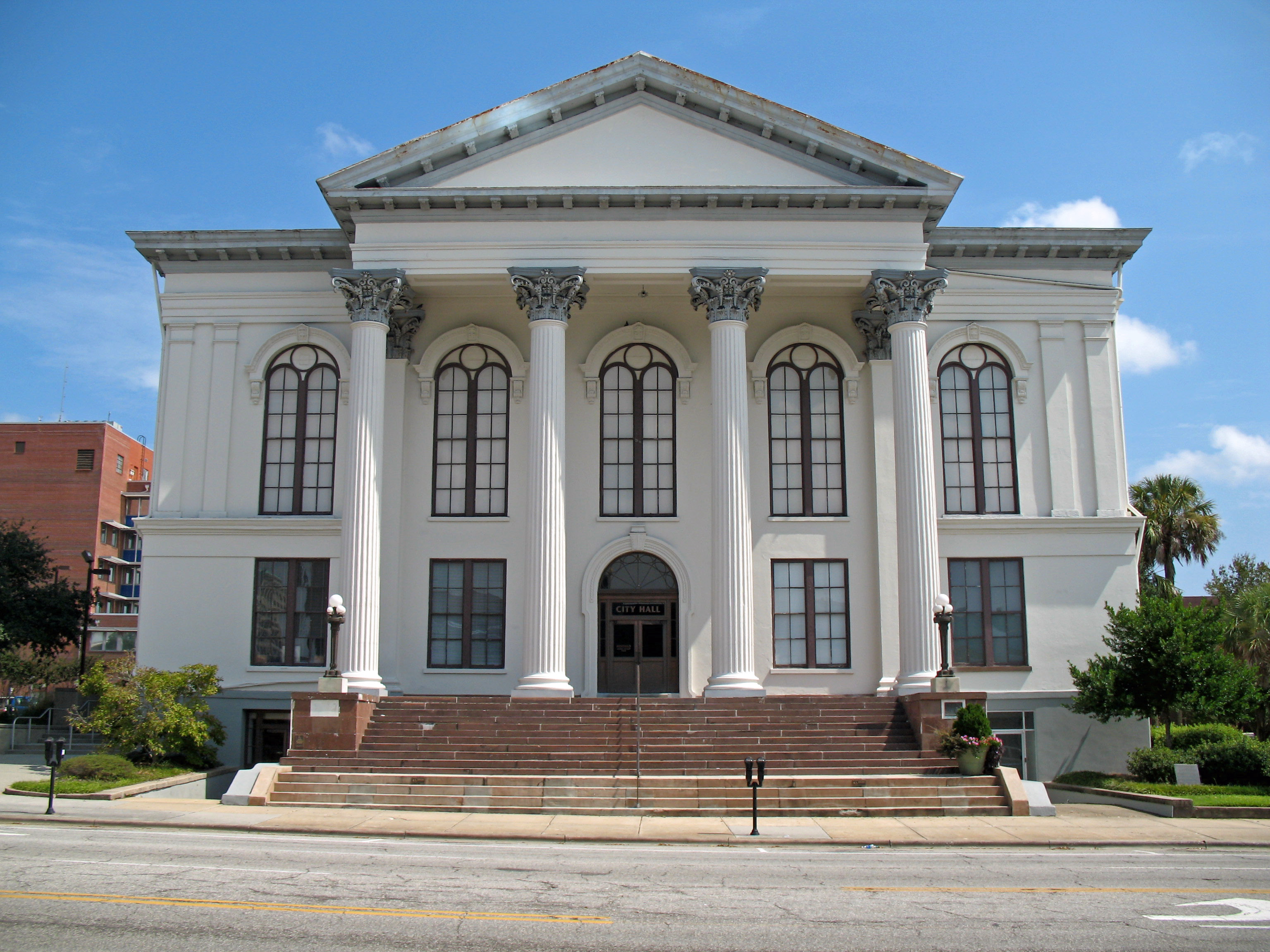
- City Hall-Thalian Hall, September 2009

- Location within North Carolina Location within the United States
- Location: 310 Chestnut St. and 102 N 3rd St., Wilmington, North Carolina
- Coordinates: 34°14′14″N 77°56′48″W
- Area: 0.3 acres (0.12 ha)
- Built: 1858
- Built by: Post, James F.
- Architectural style: Classical Revival, Late Victorian
- NRHP reference No.: 70000464
- Added to NRHP: April 3, 1970

Thalian Hall is a historic city hall and theatre located at Wilmington, New Hanover County, North Carolina. It was built in 1858, and is a two-story, five-bay, stuccoed brick building with a combination of restrained Classical Revival and flamboyant Late Victorian design elements. The front facade features a tetrastyle Corinthian order portico. The Thalian Hall Center for the Performing Arts hosts professional, regional, and local shows to this day and is one of the most heavily utilized historic theatres in the United States. The building has been under the management of the Thalian Hall Center for the Performing Arts, Inc. since 1963.

It was listed on the National Register of Historic Places in 1970. It is located in the Wilmington Historic District.
