= George Lawrence Mabson =

American politician

George Lawrence Mabson (1846 – October 4, 1885) was a member of the North Carolina House of Representatives and the North Carolina State Senate, as well as the North Carolina Constitutional Convention of 1875.

George Lawrence Mabson was born in 1846 in Wilmington, North Carolina. He was the son of a black woman, Eliza Moore, and a prominent white man, George W. Mabson. His brother through the same father was William P. Mabson, who was also mix-race and later worked as a politician.

In the 1854, he was sent to Boston to attend school. During the Civil War, Mabson first served in the United States Navy and then joined Company G, 5th Massachusetts Cavalry Regiment in February 1864 and mustered out in Clarksville, Texas, a full Command Sergeant. He fought in the Siege of Petersburg.

After earning a degree from Howard University Law School, he became the first black lawyer in North Carolina, being admitted to the New Hanover County Bar in 1871. He was also active in the Republican Party. In 1870, he was elected to the North Carolina House of Representatives. He was elected to the North Carolina State Senate in 1872 representing New Hanover. He was appointed by Governor William Woods Holden to the rank of colonel and shared command of the 22nd Regiment of the North Carolina Militia with fellow politician William P. Canaday.

He was the nephew of William B. Gould and correspond with him frequently during the Civil War. In the 1880s, a child who was likely either his son or nephew lived with and worked for Gould in Dedham, Massachusetts.

Mabson was elected president of the J. C. Abbott Post 15 chapter of the Grand Army of the Republic when it organized in Wilmington in 1884.

Mabson died on October 4, 1885, at his home in Wilmington, and was buried at Pine Forest Cemetery in Wilmington.

== Works cited ==
- Evans, William McKee (1995). Ballots and Fence Rails: Reconstruction on the Lower Cape Fear (reprint ed.). Athens: University of Georgia Press. ISBN 0-8203-1731-4.
- Gould IV, William B. (2002). Diary of a Contraband: The Civil War Passage of a Black Sailor (paperback ed.). Stanford University Press. ISBN 0-8047-4708-3.
- Reid, Richard M. (2008). Freedom for Themselves: North Carolina's Black Soldiers in the Civil War Era. Chapel Hill, North Carolina: University of North Carolina Press. ISBN 0-8078-3174-3.
