= Alfred Lloyd =

Public official and state legislator in North Carolina

Alfred Lloyd (1837 – ?) was a public official and state legislator in North Carolina. He represented New Hanover County in the North Carolina House of Representatives in 1872 and 1874. He represented Pender County in the North Carolina House in 1876.

Alfred Lloyd was born in Onslow County in 1837. He married twice but had no children. He worked as a carpenter. He lived in Wilmington. In 1874, he was one of the incorporators of the Farmers, Mechanics and Laborers' Union Aid Association.

Lloyd served as a justice of the peace for six years. He served with fellow New Hanover Representatives Henry Brewington and William H. Moore in 1874. All three were African American.

Pender County was established from New Hanover County in 1875. Lloyd was Pender County's first representative in the state house, serving a term from 1876 to 1877. He was a Republican. In 1888, he was nominated by a splinter group of "Independent Republicans" to run for the 12th district State Senate seat. He placed third in the general election.

He built the Union Chapel Methodist Church at Harrison Creek in 1886.

== Works cited ==
- Reaves, William M. (1998). Strength Through Struggle: The Chronological and Historical Record of the African-American Community in Wilmington, North Carolina, 1865-1950. New Hanover Public Library. ISBN 9780967041001.
