= Henry Brewington =

American state legislator

Henry Brewington was an American state legislator in North Carolina. He represented New Hanover County in the North Carolina House of Representatives in 1874. He was one of 13 African Americans who served that term in the House. He was one of three African Americans who represented New Hanover County in the North Carolina House of Representatives in 1874. New Hanover Representatives Alfred Lloyd and William H. Moore were the two other African Americans who served during his term.

== See also ==
- African American officeholders from the end of the Civil War until before 1900
