= USS Cambridge (1860) =

Gunboat of the United States Navy

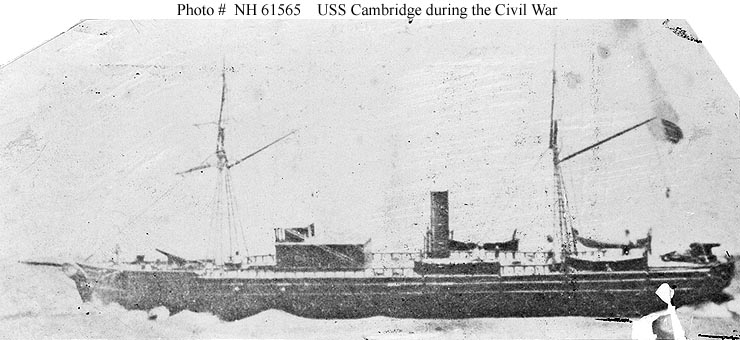
- USS Cambridge (1861-1865) Depicted during the Civil War. This 19th-century photographic print may be of an artwork, or possibly a model.

History

United States
- Name: USS Cambridge
- Launched: 1860
- Acquired: 30 July 1861
- Commissioned: 29 August 1861
- Decommissioned: June 1865
- Fate: Sold, 20 June 1865

General characteristics
- Type: Gunboat
- Displacement: 868 long tons (882 t)
- Length: 200 ft (61 m)
- Beam: 32 ft (9.8 m)
- Draft: 13 ft 6 in (4.11 m)
- Propulsion: Steam engine; screw-propelled
- Speed: 10 kn (12 mph; 19 km/h)
- Complement: 96
- Armament: 2 × 8 in (203 mm) rifles

USS Cambridge was a heavy (868 long tons (882 t)) steamship purchased by the Union Navy at the start of the American Civil War.

She was outfitted as a gunboat, with two powerful 8 in (203 mm) rifled guns, and assigned to the blockade of ports and waterways of the Confederate States of America.

== Service history ==
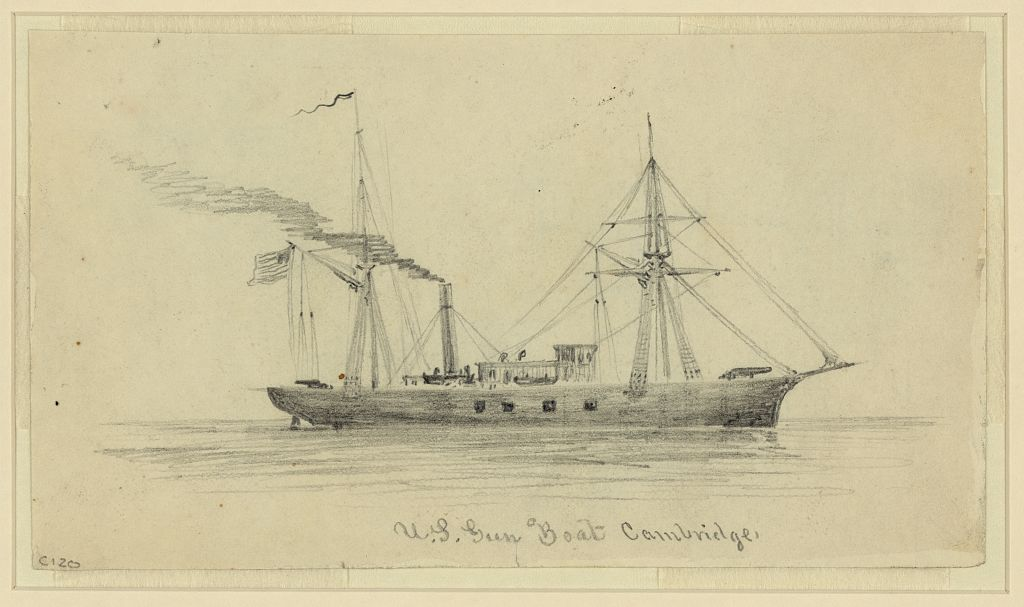
USS Cambridge drawing

Cambridge — an armed steamer — was built in 1860 by Paul Curtis, Medford, Massachusetts; purchased at Boston, Massachusetts on 30 July 1861; and commissioned on 29 August 1861, Commander W. A. Parker in command. Assigned to the North Atlantic Blockading Squadron from 9 September 1861 – 5 October 1864, and to the South Atlantic Blockading Squadron from 9 February 1865 until the close of the war, Cambridge helped tighten the stranglehold on the Confederacy as she cruised off the coasts of Virginia and North Carolina and South Carolina. Determined vigilance and alert action won her 11 prizes, some of them taken under the guns of Confederate shore batteries. In a brief five days, she and two other ships in company took four blockade runners, and chased a fifth ashore.

In one of her most daring exploits, Cambridge's guns drove a schooner ashore near Masonboro Inlet, North Carolina on 17 November 1862. Boat parties from Cambridge rowed through boiling surf, which swamped one of the boats, to burn the schooner, only to be made prisoner themselves by a party of armed Confederate men who sprang out of the brush. Cambridge was decommissioned at Philadelphia, Pennsylvania, and sold there on 20 June 1865.

== Historical Relevance ==
Cambridge is notable for having picked up escaped slave William B. Gould off Cape Fear, North Carolina.
