= Henry Eppes =

African-American politician (1830-1903

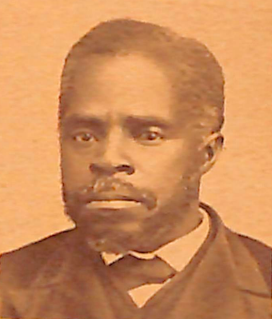

Member of the North Carolina Senate

Personal details
- Born: September 16, 1830 Halifax, North Carolina, US
- Died: January 26, 1903 (aged 72) Halifax, North Carolina, US
- Resting place: Halifax County, North Carolina, US
- Occupation: Minister, brick mason and plasterer

Henry Eppes (September 16, 1830 or 1831 – January 26, 1903) was an American politician and minister. Despite being born into slavery, he served seven terms in the North Carolina Senate and also served as a delegate for Halifax County to North Carolina's 1868 Constitutional Convention.

== Early life ==
Eppes was born enslaved in Halifax County, North Carolina on September 16, 1830 or 1831. Halifax County was part of North Carolina's "black belt", where the African American population outnumbered the white population. The county was also infamous as a "hotspot for criminal violence against former slaves."

Eppes did not have a formal education but taught himself to read and write. He married Lavina Knight and had 13 children with her. He worked as a brick mason, plasterer, and Methodist minister.

== Career ==
After the Civil War, Eppes worked as a registrar for the Freedmen's Bureau and attended the State Equal Rights League Convention of Freedmen in 1866. He also worked as a brick mason and plasterer. In 1867, the North Carolina Republicans selected Eppes to be a statewide campaign speaker. Eppes was elected to serve as a delegate for Halifax County in North Carolina's Constitutional Convention in 1868. He was one of 13 colored delegates. He served on the body's Committee on Homesteads.

Also in 1867, the Union military government appointed Eppes to work as a registrar. He was also appointed to be a justice of the peace for Halifax County in 1869.

Eppes was elected to the North Carolina Senate for the term beginning 1868, representing Halifax County. He was one of 13 colored men to serve that legislative term. The 1868 legislature met in two sessions. In the first session, Eppes served on the Committee on Corporations and the Committee on Privileges and Elections, and a special committee for locating a state penitentiary. In the second session he served on the Committee on Agriculture and a special committee for roads. During the term of the 1870 legislature he served on the Committee on Agriculture.

Eppes' legislation supported the rights of African Americans. In March 1869, he proposed legislation for equal access to public conveyances; however, his bill did not pass. In August 1868, Eppes supported a bill authorizing the creation of a state militia, arguing such a force could help curtail political violence. In February 1871 he opposed legislation redrawing the Nash–Edgecombe county line.

Eppes continuously served in the Senate from 1868 until 1874. He returned to serve in the Senate in 1879/1880. Following another break in his service, he sought the seat to the Senate in 1886 and won, serving in the subsequent legislature.

In 1886 a North Carolina colored teachers association—dissatisfied with the failure of the state to support a university for blacks—demanded that black students be enrolled at the University of North Carolina at Chapel Hill. In an attempt to pre-empt a white backlash to the demand, in February 1887, Eppes proposed legislation for the establishment of a separate statewide normal and collegiate institution for African American students. In presenting his bill, Eppes spoke of his desire for equal educational opportunities, rejected the notion that blacks wanted integrated institutions, and warned that "we will come again bye and bye" should the legislature fail to enhance educational opportunities for blacks. The Senate defeated the bill with 37 votes against to his one in support.

He was a delegate at the 1872 Republican National Convention held in Philadelphia, nominating Ulysses S. Grant to a second term as president.

After retiring from politics, Eppes invested in real estate in Halifax County and Wilmington, North Carolina. In 1889, he and other black leaders formed the People's Perpetual Building and Loan Association which empowered its shareholders to purchase homes by giving them access to credit. It operated until December 1898. Eppes' own real estate speculative activities left him heavily in debt by the time of his death.

== Legacy and honors ==
Eppes and other African American politicians who served between 1868 and 1900 were recognized by a 2013 Senate Joint Resolution by the North Carolina General Assembly.

== Personal life ==
Eppes was married to Lavinia Knight of Halifax County while they were both enslaved. The couple had thirteen children, seven of which survived to adulthood. Educator Charles Montgomery Eppes, namesake of the C. M. Eppes school in Greenville, North Carolina, was one of his sons.

Eppes was an elder and minister in the African Methodist Episcopal Church. While in Raleigh for legislative duties he served as a pastor at the St. Paul A. M. E. Church in Raleigh. He also was a delegate to the Methodist General Conference in Atlanta, Georgia and Baltimore, Maryland.

Eppes died on January 26, 1903, in Halifax following a bout of illness. (Note: Eppes' death date is incorrectly reported as 1917 in some sources. Hill notes that Eppes's son wrote a letter in February 1903 that mentions his father's funeral on January 29 in Halifax. The error probably resulted from the 1917 death certificate of a man named Henry Epps in Halifax County.) He was buried in the town three days later.

== See also ==
- African American officeholders from the end of the Civil War until before 1900

== Works cited ==
- Anderson, Eric (1980). Race and Politics in North Carolina, 1872–1901: The Black Second. Baton Rouge: Louisiana State University Press. ISBN 9780807107843 – via Google Books.
- Balanoff, Elizabeth (January 1972). "Negro Legislators in the North Carolina General Assembly, July, 1868-February, 1872". The North Carolina Historical Review. 49 (1): 22–55. JSTOR 23529002.
- Bernstein, Leonard (October 1949). "The Participation of Negro Delegates in the Constitutional Convention of 1868 in North Carolina". The Journal of Negro History. 34 (4): 391–409. doi:10.2307/2715607. JSTOR 2715607.
- Cheney, John L. Jr., ed. (1975). North Carolina Government, 1585-1974 : a Narrative and Statistical History. Raleigh: North Carolina Department of the Secretary of State.
- Haley, John H. (2014). Charles N. Hunter and Race Relations in North Carolina. Chapel Hill: The University of North Carolina Press. ISBN 9781469617060.
- Logan, Frenise A. (April 1958). "The Movement to Establish a State Supported College for Negroes". The North Carolina Historical Review. 35 (2): 167–180. JSTOR 23517050.
- Tomlinson, J. S. (1879). Tar Heel sketch-book. A brief biographical sketch of the life and public acts of the members of the General Assembly of North Carolina. Session of 1879. Raleigh, North Carolina: Raleigh News Steam Book and Job Office – via Internet Archive.
