= Hanson Truman Hughes =

North Carolinian state legislator

North Carolina House of Representatives

North Carolina Senate

North Carolina justice of the peace
- In office April 1881 – ?

Personal details
- Born: North Carolina, U.S.
- Died: July 16, 1910 East Orange, New Jersey, U.S.
- Spouse: Delia Ann Reid
- Children: 7
- Occupation: Politician, barber

Hanson Truman Hughes (died July 16, 1910) was an American politician and state legislator in North Carolina. He represented Granville County, North Carolina in the North Carolina House of Representatives in 1876. He was one of five African Americans serving in the North Carolina Senate in 1876 to 1877. He also worked as a barber.

== Early life ==
Hanson Truman Hughes was born in North Carolina. He may have been enslaved prior to the conclusion of the American Civil War. Hanson lived in early life in Oxford, a town in Granville County, North Carolina; and in later life he lived in Charlotte, North Carolina.

Hughes married Delia Ann Reid and together they had seven children. She died in 1897.

== Career ==
Hughes worked as a barber. He owned land and personal property of substantial value and became a leader within the African-American community. He served as a trustee of the A.M.E. Church in Raleigh and was one of two dozen agents authorized to collect money on its behalf.

In 1867, Hughes became the first colored man to serve on a jury in North Carolina during the Reconstruction era when he was summoned to serve for the U.S. District Court. He was prosecuted on riot charges in 1875 for leading a boisterous horseback procession in Oxford to celebrate the anniversary of the Emancipation Proclamation. The local Superior Court and State Supreme Court eventually determined that the procession was legal.

Hughes represented Granville County in the North Carolina House of Representatives from 1872 to 1875. He represented Granville in the State Senate from 1876 to 1877, serving alongside four other black solons. His credentials were accepted and he took his seat in the Senate on November 22, 1876.

In April 1881, Hughes was appointed as justice of the peace in Oxford Township.

== Later life ==
Hughes died while visiting one of his children in East Orange, New Jersey, on July 16, 1910, at 74 years of age.

== Works cited ==
- Cheney, John L. Jr., ed. (1981). North Carolina Government, 1585-1979: A Narrative and Statistical History (revised ed.). Raleigh: North Carolina Secretary of State. OCLC 1290270510.
- Frampton, Thomas Ward (May 2024). "The First Black Jurors and the Integration of the American Jury" (PDF). New York University Law Review. 99 (2): 515–577.
- Kenzer, Robert C. (1997). Enterprising Southerners: Black Economic Success in North Carolina, 1865-1915. University of Virginia Press. ISBN 9780813917337.
- Logan, Frenise A. (1984). "Black and Republican: Vicissitudes of a Minority Twice Over in the North Carolina House of Representatives, 1876-1877". The North Carolina Historical Review. 61 (3): 311–346. ISSN 0029-2494. JSTOR 23518927.
- Longley, Max (2020). Quaker Carpetbagger: J. Williams Thorne, Underground Railroad Host Turned North Carolina Politician. Jefferson: McFarland. ISBN 9781476637747 – via Google Books.
- Murray, Elizabeth Reid (1983). Wake, Capital County of North Carolina. Vol. 1. Raleigh: Capital County Publishing Company.
