= Richard Humbert =

American politician (1836–1905)

Richard H. Humbert or Humbird (September 1836 – June 15, 1905) was an American carpenter, soldier, minister, and merchant who was a delegate from Darlington County to South Carolina's 1868 Constitutional Convention. He also served multiple terms as a member of the South Carolina House of Representatives.

He served in the U.S. Colored Infantry during the American Civil War and was in a regiment stationed in South Carolina during the conflict. He enlisted in Poughkeepsie, New York, in March 1865.

He served in the South Carolina House of Representatives from 1871 to 1878. He appeared on a Union Republican Ticket (as Richard Humbird) with B. F. Whittemore, Isaac Brockenton, and Jordan Lang. He served in South Carolina's militia.

He was born in 1835 in Savannah, Georgia. He had four children.

In 1874 he was elected with J. A. Smith, S. J. Keith, and Alfred Rush.

He is credited with building the St. James A.M.E. Church at 305 Cherry Street in Abbeville, South Carolina.
