= Isaac Brockenton =

American politician (1828–1908)

Isaac P. Brockenton (May 19, 1828 - January 6, 1908) was a minister, trial justice, county commissioner, and state legislator in South Carolina. He represented Darlington County, South Carolina in the South Carolina House of Representatives.

He studied at Richmond Theological Seminary and was a founding leader of Macedonia Missionary Baptist Church in Darlington.

He served as a delegate from Darlington County to the 1868 South Carolina Constitutional Convention. He was a Republican.

He married Martha Jackson and had several children. He helped organize the Negro Baptist Convention of South Carolina and served as its president for 40 years. He also served as a moderator for the Pee Dee Baptist Association and on the Board of Trustees Member at Benedict College in Columbia, South Carolina and Morris College in Sumter, South Carolina. He was the first president of the Baptist Educational and Missionary Convention of South Carolina. He is buried at the Darlington Memorial Cemetery. The Library of Congress has an uncut sheet of Union Republican Tickets for B. F. Whittemore, Brockenton, Jordan Lang, and Richard Humbert (written as Richard Hunbird) for a convention.
