= Joseph H. Rainey House =

Historic house in South Carolina, US

- U.S. National Register of Historic Places
- U.S. National Historic Landmark
- U.S. Historic district – Contributing property
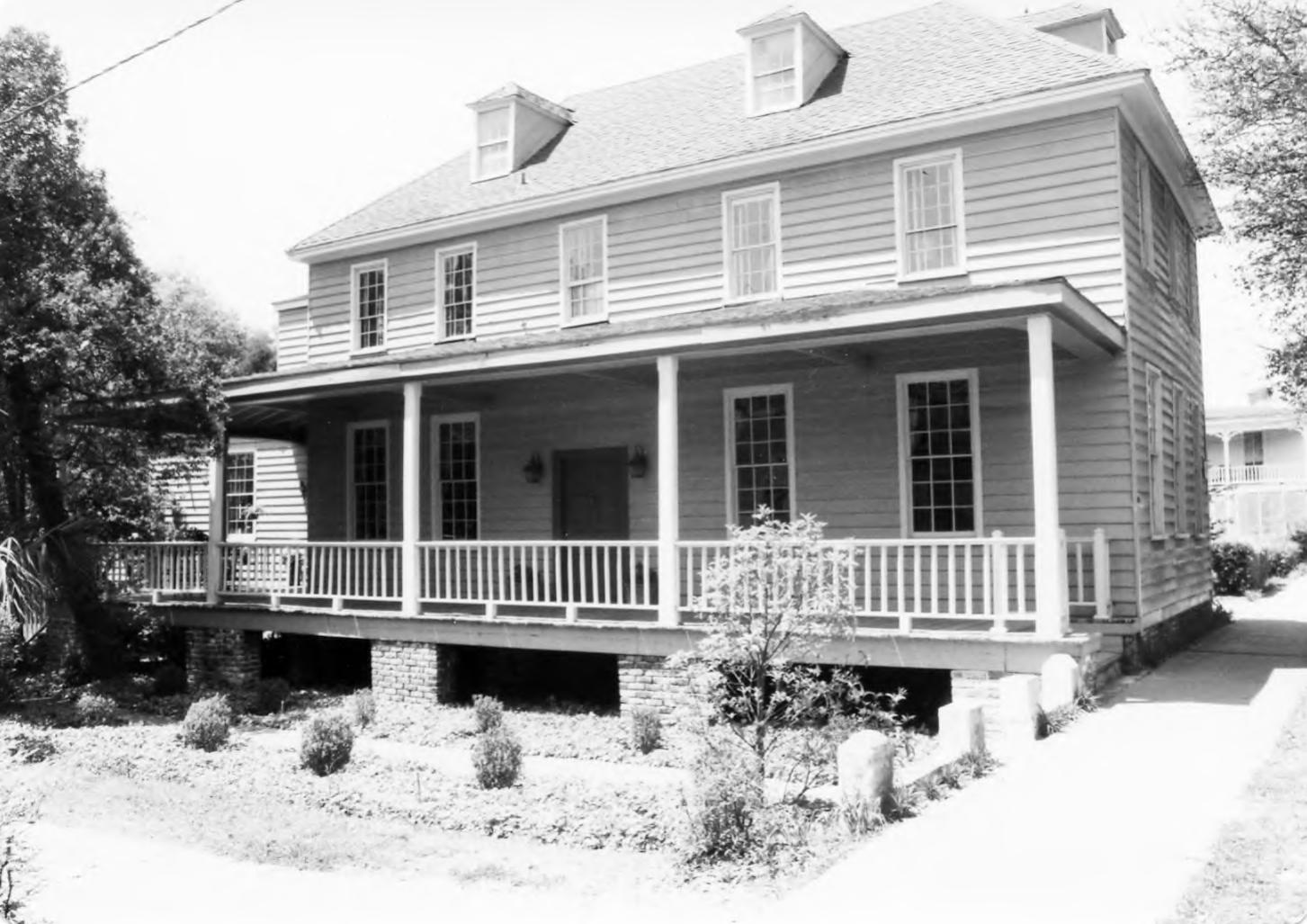

- Location within South Carolina Location within the United States
- Location: 909 Prince St., Georgetown, South Carolina
- Coordinates: 33°22′7.8″N 79°17′5″W
- Built: ca. 1760
- Part of: Georgetown Historic District (ID71000781)
- NRHP reference No.: 84003877

Significant dates
- Added to NRHP: April 20, 1984
- Designated NHL: April 20, 1984
- Designated CP: October 14, 1971

The Joseph H. Rainey House, also known as the Rainey-Camlin House, is a historic house at 909 Prince Street in Georgetown, South Carolina. Built in the 1760s, after the Civil War it was the home of Joseph H. Rainey, the first black United States Congressman (R-SC). Born into slavery and freed as a child by his parents, he served several terms, serving from 1870 into 1878. The house was designated a National Historic Landmark in 1984.

== Rainey ==
Rainey, born a slave in 1832 in Georgetown, was freed by his parents. They had been enslaved but succeeded in buying their own freedom from saving money from being leased out. They bought his freedom. His parents became reasonably prosperous with a barbershop business in Charleston, South Carolina, where they moved in 1846. They also enabled Joseph to gain some private education.

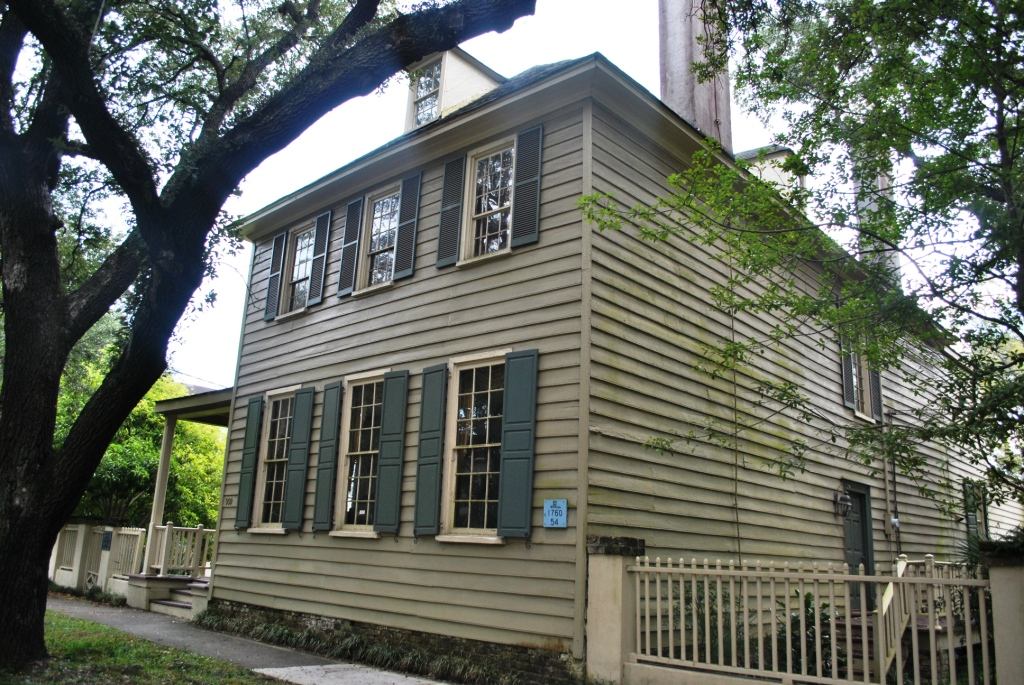
The house in 2013

In 1861 Rainey worked as a steward on a Confederate blockade-runner ship. After he was drafted in 1862 to serve the Confederacy as a laborer, he escaped with his wife to Bermuda. There he again worked as a barber, and borrowed books from friends and neighbors to continue his education.

In 1866, the Rainey couple returned to South Carolina. He became involved in politics after constitutional amendments were passed that gave African-American men the franchise. In 1868 Rainey was elected as a Republican to the South Carolina state senate. In 1870 he was selected to assume the U.S. Congress position denied to B. F. Whittemore on grounds of Whittemore's apparent corruption. He was reelected, and served four terms, finally losing election in 1878, as whites took back political power in the state.

He was the longest-serving Black congressman until William L. Dawson in the 1950s.

As a Congressman he spoke vigorously in support of enforcement of the Ku Klux Klan Act of 1871.

Rainey returned to his Georgetown home in 1886 and died in 1887.

== Home on Prince Street ==
According to "local tradition", the house was Rainey's birthplace in 1832. His family was said to live here until they moved to Charleston in 1846.

More surely known is that "it was from here that he launched his political career in 1867," after the Civil War. While Rainey served in Congress, the house served as his district headquarters. He lived here when on recess from Congress.

The home on Prince Street in Georgetown is a single family clapboarded house. It is 2½ stories tall, with two chimneys and a hipped roof interrupted by hipped dormers. It was restored during 1973–74. Much of the home is original, including cypress paneling, pine floors, and wainscotting.

The home was listed on the National Register of Historic Places in 1984 and was declared a National Historic Landmark that year.

== See also ==
- List of National Historic Landmarks in South Carolina
- National Register of Historic Places listings in Georgetown County, South Carolina
