= John A. Chesnut =

American politician

Member of the South Carolina House of Representatives

Member of the U.S. House of Representatives from 's Kershaw County district

Delegate to the South Carolina Constitutional Convention
- In office 1868–1868

Personal details
- Born: South Carolina, U.S.
- Citizenship: American
- Occupation: Politician

John A. Chestnut (also spelled Chesnut) was a delegate to the 1868 Constitutional Convention of South Carolina. He also served in the South Carolina House of Representatives.

His grandfather was freed by Col. James Chestnut.

He, S. G. W. Dill, and Justus Kendall Jillson represented Kershaw County at the convention.
