= Hamilton Hotel (Bermuda) =

Defunct hotel in Bermuda

Coordinates: 32°17′39″N 64°46′59″W

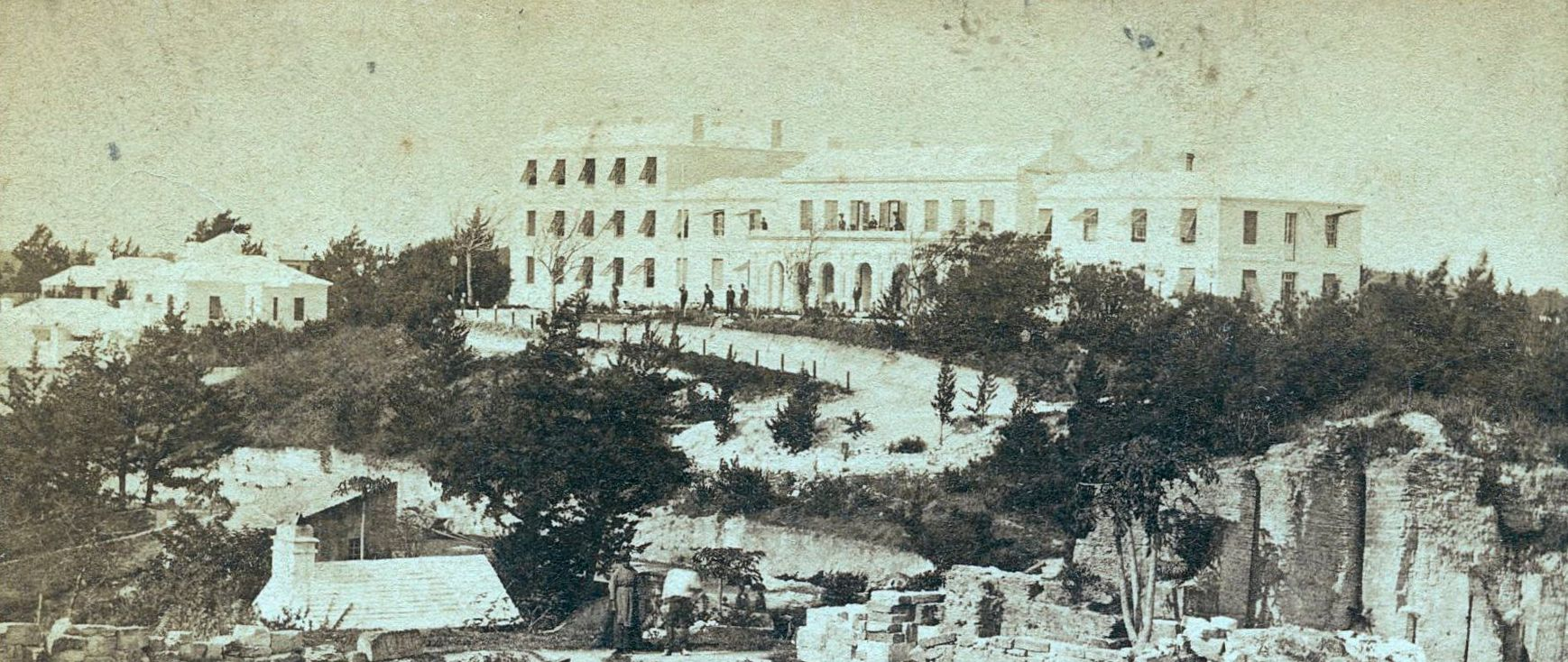
The Hamilton Hotel in 1875

Hamilton Hotel was the first purpose-built hotel in Bermuda. Located on Church Street (originally named Elliott Street) in Hamilton, construction began in 1852 and opened its doors in 1861. The hotel was instrumental in starting tourism in Bermuda. It was destroyed by fire in 1955.

== History ==
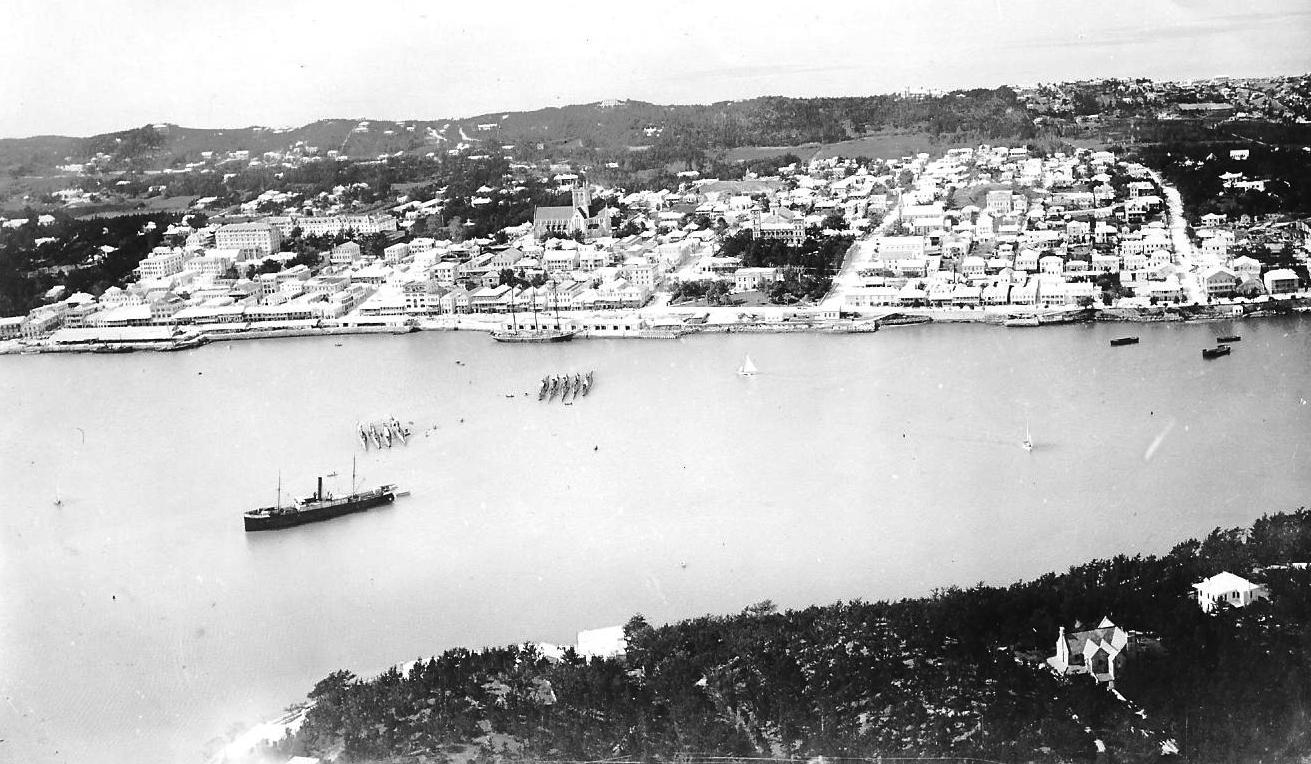
Hamilton Hotel is on the high ground at the left of this 1920s aerial photograph of the City of Hamilton and Hamilton Harbour

Construction was funded by the Corporation of Hamilton. The foundation stone of this building was laid by the Governor of Bermuda, Capt. Charles Elliot, R.N., on 19 August 1852, during the term of Mayor Henry James Tucker. Elliot was assisted in the ceremony by the members of the Masonic lodges, and by the heads of the various Public Departments, Imperial and Colonial. Completed in the following year, it originally had 36 rooms.

On 27 January 1863, a subscription ball was held there, the string band of the Flagship H.M.S. Nile furnishing the music. 21 April 1863 a public dinner was given as a sort of opening of the Hamilton Hotel. D. A. Crowell (died August, 1888, Sohooley's Mountains, New Jersey) conducted the hotel for a short space. The American Civil War exerted a depressing influence on the fortunes of the hotel. In 1865, Joseph Rainey moved his barber shop from St. George's town to the town of Hamilton when an outbreak of yellow fever threatened St. George's. Rainey worked at the Hamilton Hotel as a barber and a bartender, becoming a respected member of the community. When regular steam communication with New York City was assured, the late Jeremiah Harnett took a lease from the Corporation and associated with himself the late Mr. Dodge. The lease then entered on formed the groundwork one between Walter Aiken and the Corporation of Hamilton. James Russell Mead assumed control for the season of 1894. During the Second World War, the hotel housed a United Services Club for the recreation of Allied service personnel. Subsequently acquired by the colonial Government, then the Corporation of Hamilton, it was used for various purposes until it was destroyed by fire 23 December 1955 and replaced with the current City Hall.

== Architecture and fittings ==
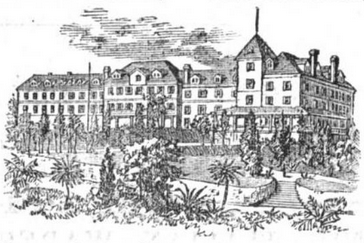
Hamilton Hotel, after additional floors were added to the original two-storey structure

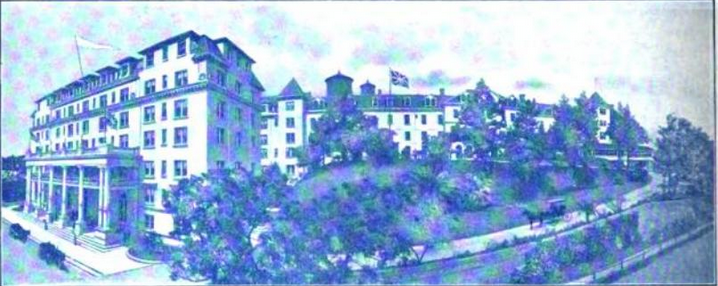
Hamilton Hotel, after construction of the new western wing

The original design comprized a two-storey centre (two which two additional floors, including an attic level, would be added) with two lateral wings and dining hall and kitchen in rear, the building being shaped as a capital The first addition made was a west wing, then extension of the dining room. The additions and alterations began in 1884 and completed 1886 altered entirely the whole aspect of the house and converted it into a hotel of large proportions. The old construction was carefully examined and wherever requisite either renewed or strengthened. In addition to the ordinary plastering, the whole building was painted externally.

New and extensive tanks were provided added. In 1888, a well was bored and successfully completed, still further improving them. In 1890, a steam passenger elevator was provided and more tankage constructed, and an ice-making machine introduced. In 1891, ten more bedrooms were added in the attic extended over the west wing instead of the flat Bermudian stone roof. In 1892, the office and waiting-room were enlarged under a better arrangement.

In 1909, it was enlarged and improved. There were then 260 rooms with baths, enough accommodation for 500 persons. It was substantial stone and concrete structure, lit with electricity and gas, and containing three elevators. There were 200 baths en-suite and numerous public baths on each floor. The hotel was heated by steam, and had open fires for cool days. The public rooms were large and comfortable, and an orchestra was provided.(Caledonian Publishing Company 1912, p. 333)

== Grounds ==
Situated on high ground overlooking the town and harbor of Hamilton, it afforded good views, and was convenient to shops, churches, Government buildings, parade grounds and the golf and cricket fields.(Caledonian Publishing Company 1912, p. 333) The grounds were laid out in terraces containing flowers and various shrubs, while the drive up and the steps for pedestrians were improved. To the northwest, adjoining the hotel in 1886, a new building called The Annex was erected, which afforded privacy to those staying there.

== Bibliography ==
- Caledonian Publishing Company (1912). The Caledonian (Public domain ed.). Caledonian Publishing Company.
- D. M. Lee (1894). The Bermuda Pocket Almanack, Guide and Directory ... (Public domain ed.). D. M. Lee.
- Philpott, Don (2 February 2004). Bermuda. Landmark Publishing Limited. ISBN 978-1-84306-039-0.
