= Joseph Rainey =

American politician (1832–1887)

Joseph Hayne Rainey
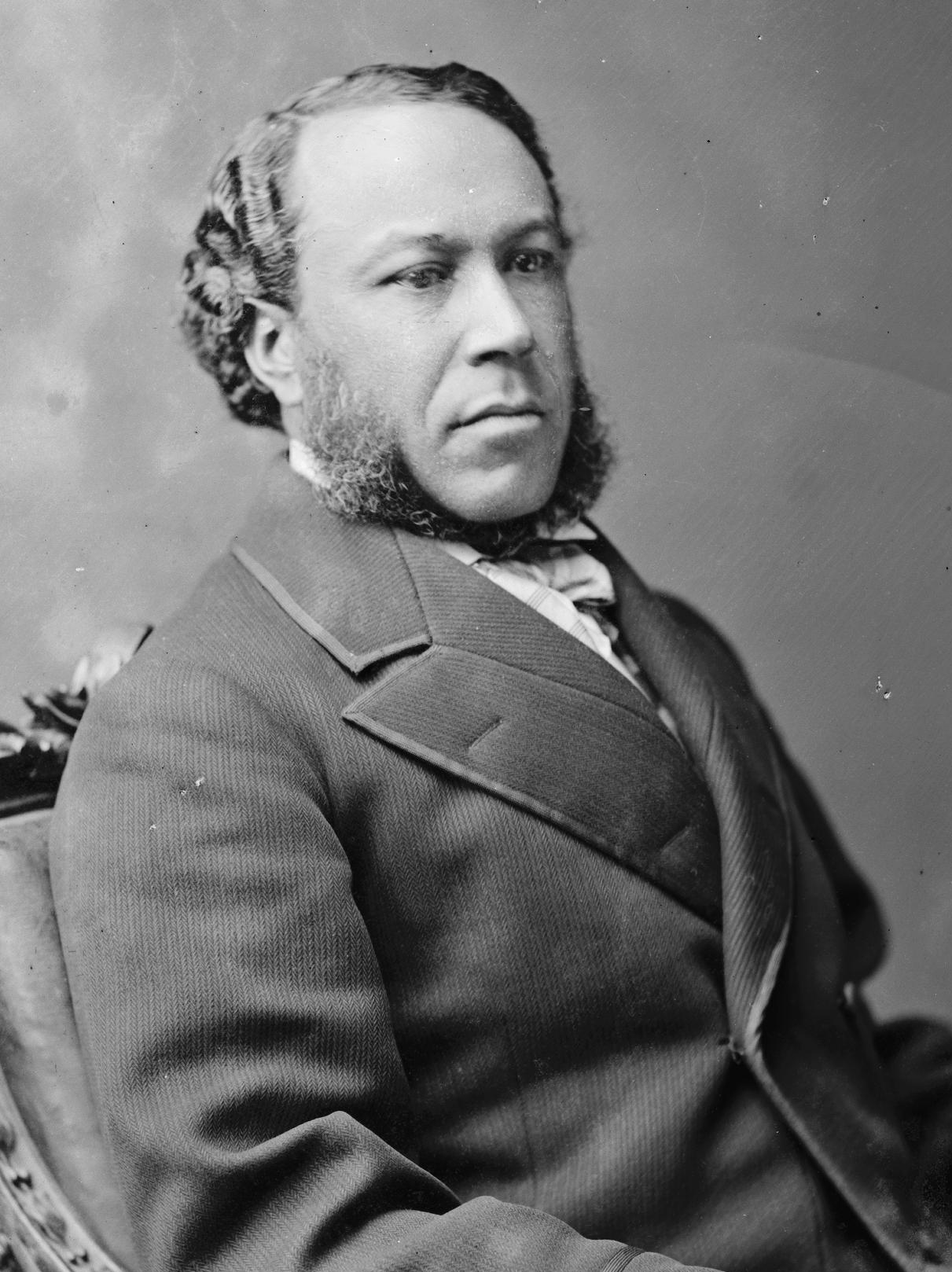
- Rainey, c. 1865–1880

Member of the U.S. House of Representatives from South Carolina's 1st district
- In office December 12, 1870 – March 3, 1879
- Preceded by: Benjamin F. Whittemore
- Succeeded by: John S. Richardson

Member of the South Carolina Senate from Georgetown County
- In office November 24, 1868 – November 28, 1870
- Preceded by: Richard Dozier
- Succeeded by: John Francis Beckman

Personal details
- Born: June 21, 1832 Georgetown, South Carolina, U.S.
- Died: August 1, 1887 (aged 55) Georgetown, South Carolina, U.S.
- Party: Republican
- Profession: Barber, politician, banker

Joseph Hayne Rainey (June 21, 1832 – August 1, 1887) was an American politician. He was the first black person to serve in the United States House of Representatives and the second black person (after Hiram Revels) to serve in the United States Congress. His service included time as presiding officer of the House of Representatives.

Born into a family of farmers and planters, Rainey was a member of the Republican Party.

== Early life and education ==
Joseph Hayne Rainey was born in 1832 in Georgetown, South Carolina. His mother, Grace was of African and French descent. His father Edward Rainey had been allowed by his master to work independently to earn money and develop a successful business as a barber. He paid a portion of his income to his master as required by law. Edward saved a substantial sum, and by the 1840s, he purchased his freedom and that of his wife and two sons. With educational opportunities severely limited for black people, Rainey followed his father into the barbering profession as an adult. It was an independent and well-respected trade that enabled him to build a wide social network in his community. By 1850, Edward Rainey had purchased a slave himself. By 1860, he had purchased more slaves, most likely working in his barbershop, along with Joseph.

== Personal life ==
In 1859, Rainey traveled to Philadelphia, Pennsylvania, where he met and married Susan, a free woman of color from the West Indies, who was also of African-French descent. They returned to South Carolina, where their three children were born: Joseph II, Herbert and Olivia.

== Career ==
=== American Civil War ===
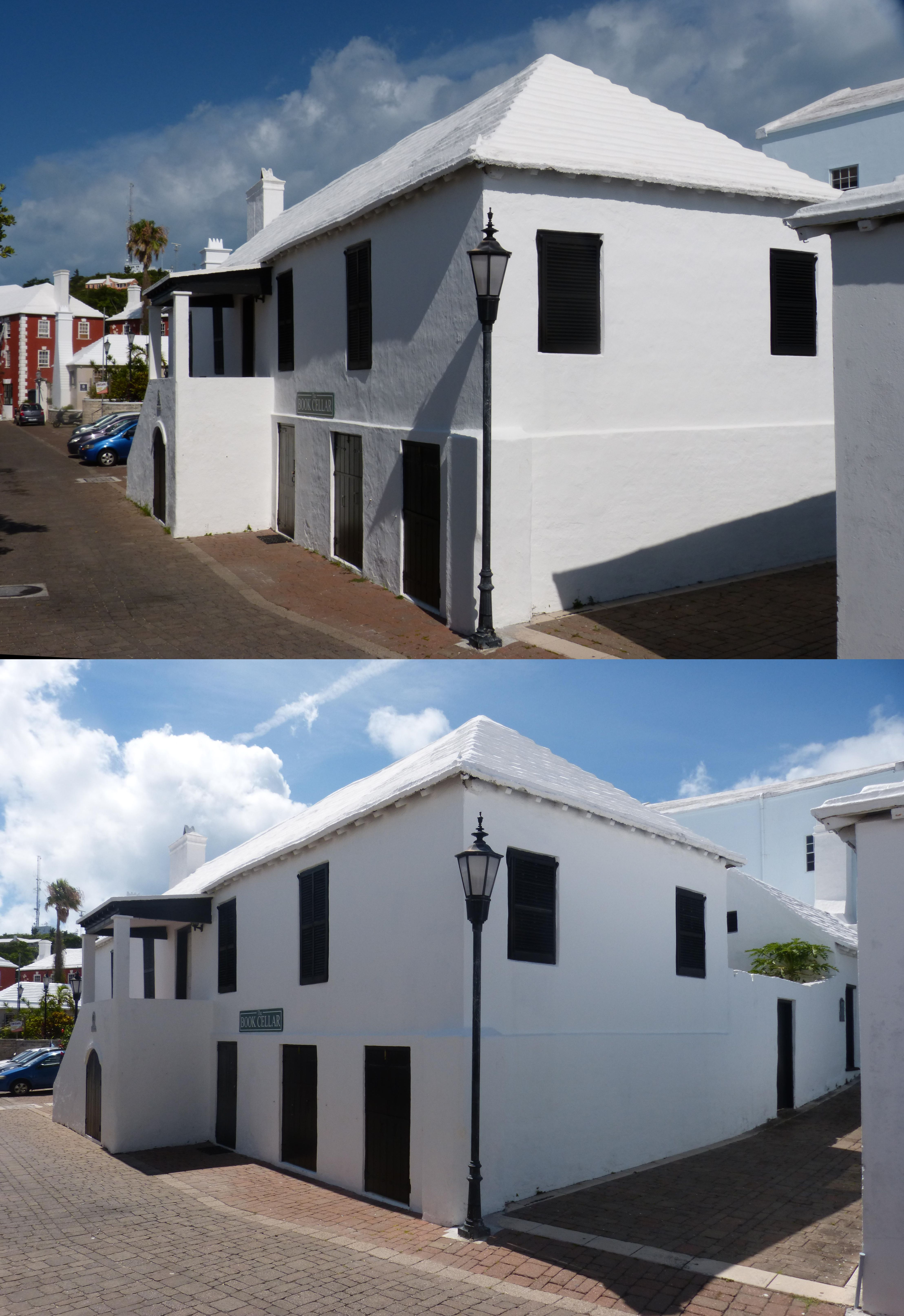
Tucker House on Water Street and Barber's Alley, St. George's, Bermuda

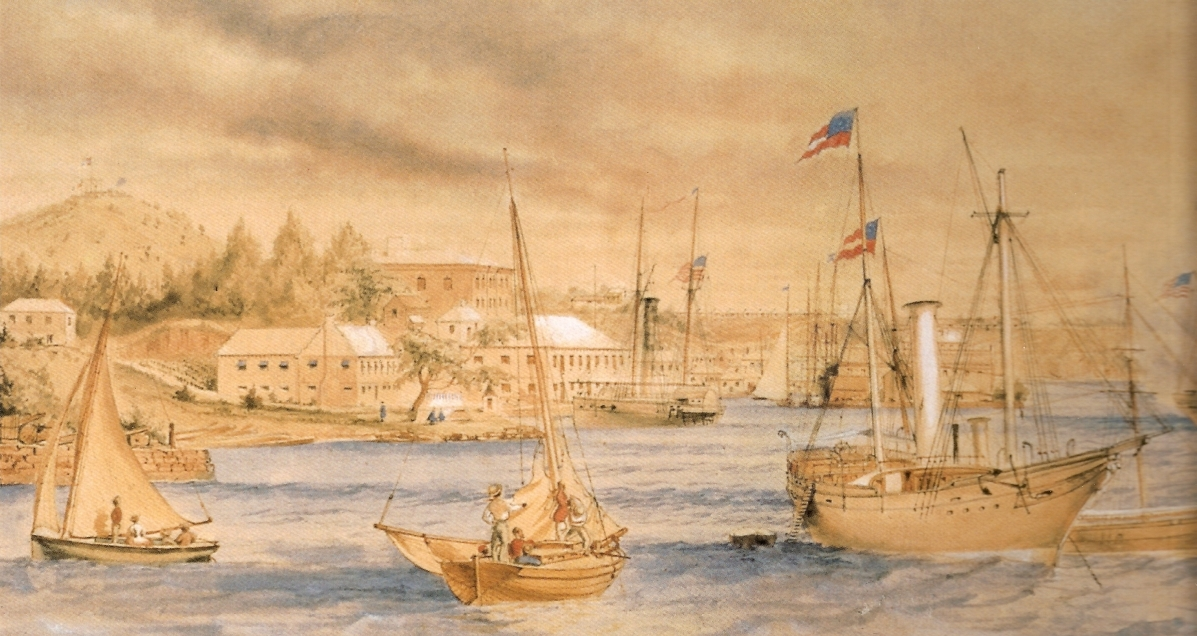
St. George's Harbour, ca. 1864. Confederate blockade runners are visible.

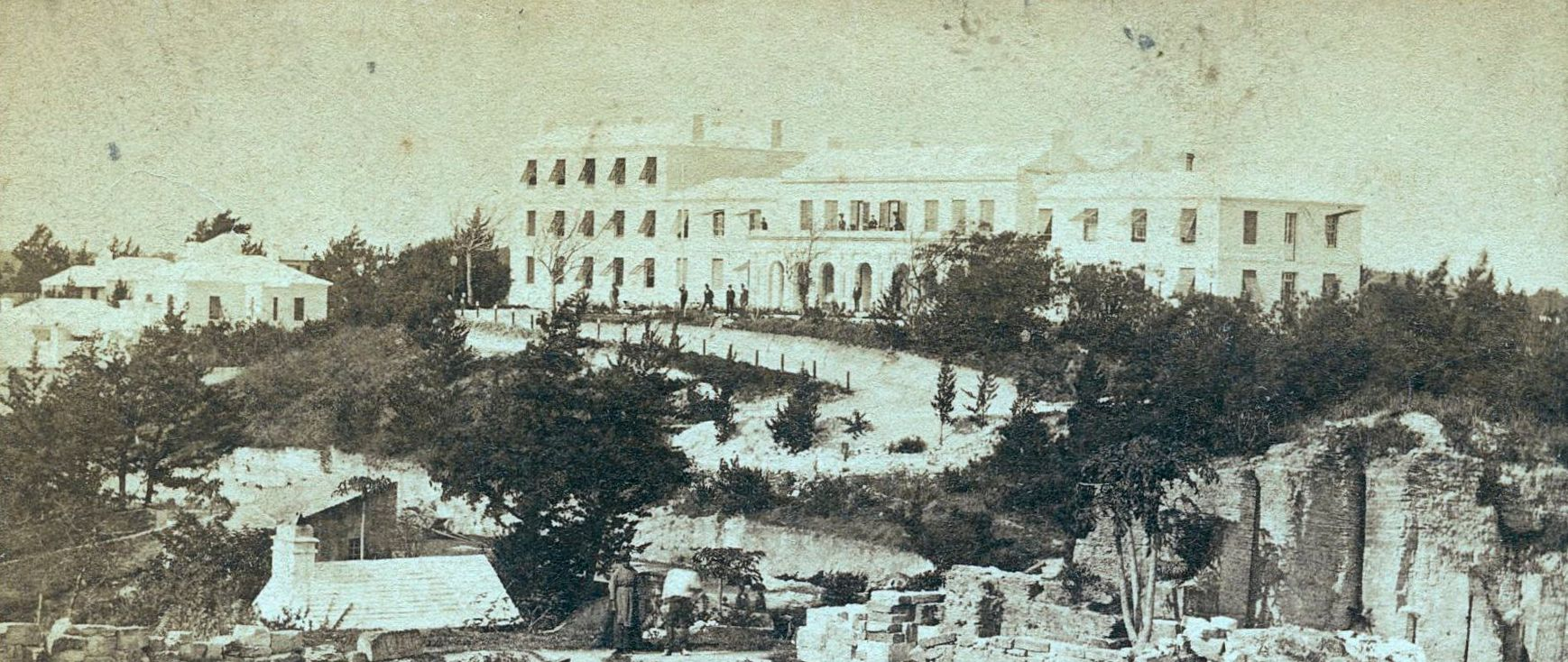
The Hamilton Hotel, in Hamilton, Bermuda, in 1875

In 1861, with the outbreak of the American Civil War, Rainey was among the free black people who were conscripted by the Confederates to work on fortifications in Charleston, South Carolina. He also worked as a cook and laborer on blockade runner ships.

In 1862, Rainey and his family escaped to the British Imperial fortress colony of Bermuda, 640 miles off Cape Hatteras, North Carolina. They settled in the town of St. George's, Bermuda (from which Charleston and South Carolina had been founded in 1669 under Governor William Sayle). There, Rainey worked as a barber. His shop was accessed from Barber's Alley and was located in the cellar of the "Tucker House", the building on the corner of Water Street and Barber's Alley that had previously been the home of Council President and sometimes acting Governor Henry Tucker of Bermuda. His wife, on the other hand, became a successful dressmaker with her own shop. In 1865, the couple moved to the town of Hamilton, Bermuda, when an outbreak of yellow fever threatened St. George's. Rainey worked at the Hamilton Hotel as a barber and a bartender, where his customers were mostly white. He became a respected member of the community and he and his wife earned a prosperous living in Bermuda. Bermuda, which had maintained close links with the former colonies in the South of the United States since the 17th Century, profited immensely from the war as the major point from which British and European manufactured weapons and supplies were trans-shipped by Confederate blockade runners into Charleston and other Southern ports, and Bermudian seamen, like Thomas Leslie Outerbridge, crewed blockade runners smuggling arms to the blockaded South. Not all Bermudians supported the Confederates, however. Black Bermudian stevedores brawled with Confederate sailors, and cargoes of Confederate cotton were burnt by arsonists on the docks of St. George's. Many black and white Bermudians fought for the Union, mostly in the U.S. Navy. Those who served in the U.S. Army included First Sergeant Robert John Simmons, who served in the 54th Massachusetts Volunteer Infantry Regiment and died in August 1863 as a result of wounds received in an attack on Fort Wagner, near Charleston, South Carolina, Robert Tappin (who had previously served in the U.S. Navy from 1863 to 1864), John Wilson and Joseph Thomas of the 31st Colored Infantry Regiment, John Thompson of the 26th Colored Infantry, Wate O. Harris, of the 6th Coloured Infantry, and George Smith.

=== Return to the U.S. and politics ===
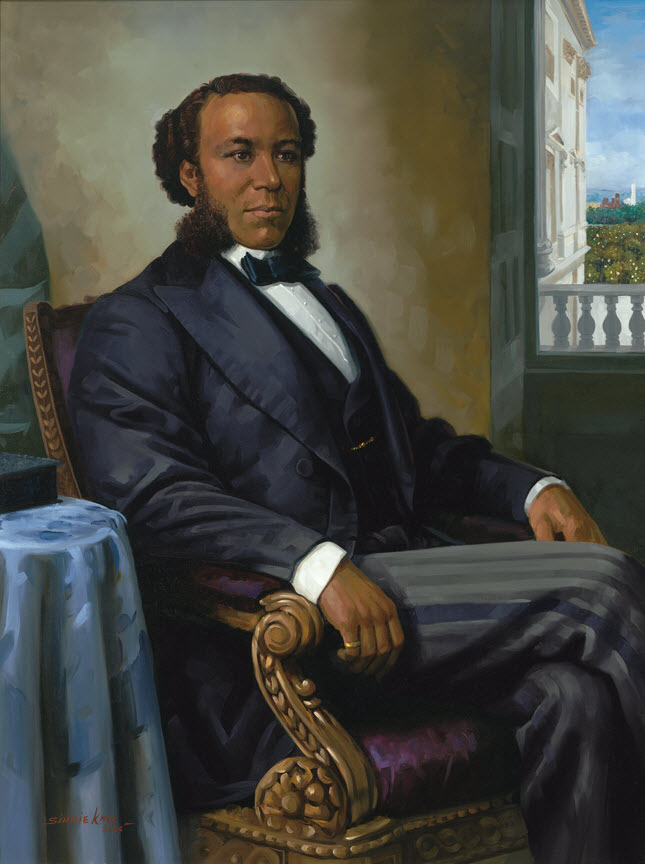
2004 portrait of Joseph Rainey by Simmie Knox, from the collection of the U.S. House of Representatives.

In 1866, following the end of the U.S. Civil War, Rainey and his family returned to South Carolina, where they settled in Charleston. In 1870, 43 percent of the city's population was African American, including many people of color who, like Rainey, had been free and held skilled jobs before the war. His experience and wealth helped establish him as a leader and he quickly became involved in politics, joining the executive committee of the state Republican Party. In 1868, he was a delegate to the state constitutional convention.

In 1870, Rainey was elected to the South Carolina Senate and became chair of the Finance Committee. He served only a short time as that year he won a special election as a Republican to fill a vacancy in the 41st United States Congress. This vacancy had been created when the House refused to seat Benjamin F. Whittemore, the incumbent. He had been censured by the House for corruption but re-elected.

Rainey was seated December 12, 1870 and was re-elected to Congress, serving a total of four terms. Serving until March 3, 1879, he established a record of length of service for a black Congressman that was not surpassed until that of William L. Dawson of Chicago in the 1950s. He supported legislation that became known as the Enforcement Acts, to suppress the violent activities of the Ku Klux Klan. This helped for a time, before white insurgents developed other paramilitary groups in the South, such as the White League and the Red Shirts.

Rainey made three speeches on the floor of Congress in support of what was finally passed as the Civil Rights Act of 1875. In 1873, he said he was not seeking 'social equality' and was content to choose his own circle.

He went on to say,

But we do want a law enacted that we may be recognized like other men in the country. Why is it that colored members of Congress cannot enjoy the same immunities that are accorded to white members? Why cannot we stop at hotels here without meeting objection? Why cannot we go into restaurants without being insulted? We are here enacting laws for the country and casting votes upon important questions; we have been sent here by the suffrages of the people, and why cannot we enjoy the same benefits that are accorded to our white colleagues on this floor?

With violence against black people increasing in the South, in 1874 Rainey purchased a "summer home" in Windsor, Connecticut. As a U.S. representative from South Carolina, Rainey could not use Windsor as his primary residence, but he moved his family there for their safety. While visiting, he became an active member of the First Church of Windsor. The "Joseph H. Rainey House", a c. 1830 Greek Revival, is located at 299 Palisado Avenue (it is used as a private residence). It was designated as one of 130 stops on the Connecticut Freedom Trail, established in 1996 to highlight the achievements of African Americans in gaining freedom and civil rights.

He also worked to promote the Southern economy. In May 1874, Rainey became the first African American to preside over the House of Representatives as Speaker pro tempore.

In the closing hours of Congress in 1878, Rainey was one of the few sober members present. He acted to ensure the passage of an $18 million civil service appropriation bill that would not have been passed without his firm presence.

Beginning in 1874, paramilitary terrorist groups such as the Red Shirts in North and South Carolina and Louisiana had acted openly as the military arm of the Democratic Party to suppress black voting. In July 1876, six black people were murdered in the Hamburg Massacre and, in October, between 25 and 100 were killed by white paramilitary groups in several days of violence in Ellenton, both in contested Aiken County, South Carolina.

In 1876, Rainey won re-election from the Charleston district against Democratic candidate John Smythe Richardson. Richardson challenged the result as invalid on the grounds of intimidation of Democrats by federal soldiers and black militias guarding the polls, but Rainey retained his seat. The 1876 election was marked by widespread fraud in the state. For instance, votes counted in the upland Edgefield County for the Democratic gubernatorial candidate Wade Hampton III exceeded by 2,000 the total number of registered voters in the county; similar results were counted in Laurens County. That year Democrats ultimately took control of the state government, and the next year the federal government withdrew its troops from the South as part of a national compromise; Reconstruction was ended.

In mid-1878, Rainey warned President Hayes of increasing violence and rhetoric meant to limit the African-American vote in South Carolina.

In 1878, Rainey was defeated in a second contest with Richardson, although black men continued to be elected for numerous local offices through much of the 19th century. White Democrats used their dominance of the state legislature to pass laws for segregation, Jim Crow and making voter registration more difficult, effectively disenfranchising black people. In 1895, they passed a new state constitution, that completed the disenfranchisement of most black people, stripping them of political power and excluding them from the political process for the next several decades into the 1960s.

== Later life and death ==
After leaving the U.S. Congress, Rainey was appointed as a federal agent of the US Treasury Department for internal revenue in South Carolina. He held this position for two years, after which he began a career in private commerce. He worked in brokerage and banking in Washington, DC for five years.

Rainey retired in 1886 and returned to South Carolina. At the age of 55, he contracted malaria and died less than a year later, in August 1887 in Georgetown, the city of his birth.

== Legacy ==
In 2018, the Joseph Rainey Center for Public Policy, 501(c)3 think-tank was founded by Sarah E. Hunt and Bishop Garrison with the stated goal of empowering the voices of women, minorities and mavericks in public policy.

== See also ==
- List of African American firsts
- List of African-American United States representatives

U.S. House of Representatives
Preceded by Benjamin F. Whittemore	Member of the U.S. House of Representatives from South Carolina's 1st congressional district 1870–1879	Succeeded by John S. Richardson
