= Darlington Memorial Cemetery =

Historic site in Darlington County, South Carolina, US

- U.S. National Register of Historic Places
- Location within South Carolina Location within the United States
- Location: Ave. D and Friendship St., Darlington, South Carolina
- Coordinates: 34.30199°N 79.85558°W
- Area: 9 acres (3.6 ha)
- Built: 1890
- NRHP reference No.: 05000576
- Added to NRHP: June 9, 2005

Darlington Memorial Cemetery, also known as the Darlington Community Cemetery or the Darlington City Cemetery, is a historic African-American cemetery located at Darlington, Darlington County, South Carolina. The cemetery dates from 1890, and until 1946 it was the only African-American cemetery within the city limits of Darlington. It was expanded by four additional acres in 1946, for a total of approximately nine acres. There are approximately 1,900 graves in the cemetery, with most burials dating from the early- to mid-20th century.

It was listed on the National Register of Historic Places in 2005.

== Notable burials ==
Burials at the cemetery include:

- James Lawrence Cain (1871–1944), educator
- Isaac Brockenton (1928–1908), minister and public figure
- Edmund H. Deas (1855–1915), politician
- Lawrence Reese (1864–1915), merchant and artisan
- Mable K. Howard (d. 1963), educator
