= John Boston (politician) =

American politician (c.1832 – c.1880)

John Boston (ca. 1832 – after 1880) was an American politician. He was enslaved before becoming a representative from Darlington County in the South Carolina House of Representatives during the Reconstruction era. He helped establish the Lamar Colored Methodist Church in 1865.

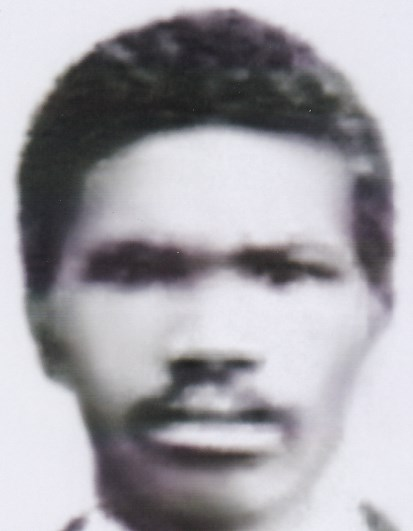
John Boston

== Early life ==
Boston was born into slavery around 1832 in Lisbon Township (now Lamar, South Carolina) in Darlington County, South Carolina.

== Career ==
In 1865, Boston founded the Lamar Colored Methodist Episcopal Church. He served as the church's minister from 1865 to 1867. The initial church services were held under a brush arbor until 1866, when the construction of the church was completed. The church is now the John Wesley Methodist Church.

In 1873, he attended the South Carolina Conference of the Methodist Episcopal Church. He was from Timmonsville, which is about 9 miles from Lamar. Boston was a school trustee, community supporter, and a real estate investor.

He represented Darlington County in the South Carolina House of Representatives from 1868 to 1870 and again from 1872 to 1874. In 1868, there were four representatives from Darlington, three of whom were colored: John Boston, Alfred Rush, and Jordan Lang. The white representative was G. Holliman. Boston was particularly focused on judicial integrity and civil rights. He lobbied for children of his constituents to gain acceptance to the University of South Carolina. For instance, R. Marcus Dubose was accepted in December 1869. Boston was a farmer by 1880 in the town of Lisbon in Boston Township, a former Darlington County township that was named after him.

== Personal life ==
Boston and his wife, Lucy A. Boston, had eight children: Henry, Cornelius, George, Ronnie, Jane, John H., J. Johnson, and Mary.

Boston was buried in what is now the John Wesley Methodist Church cemetery.

== See also ==
- African American officeholders from the end of the Civil War until before 1900
