= Alfred Rush =

American politician (??–1876)

South Carolina House of Representatives
- In office 1868–1870
- In office 1874 – May 13, 1876

Personal details
- Died: May 13, 1876 Timmonsville, South Carolina, U.S.

Alfred Rush (died May 13, 1876) was a state representative in South Carolina during the Reconstruction era, serving two non-consecutive terms between 1868 and 1876. Rush was one of four men who represented Darlington County, South Carolina, three of whom were African Americans and one was white. Rush was elected to serve just a few years after the Civil War (1861–1865). He was ambushed and murdered on May 13, 1876.

== Early and personal life ==
Alfred Rush was born a slave of mixed-race heritage near Ebenezer, South Carolina to the Gee family. In 1811, John Gee settled in what was then Darlington County, South Carolina. His first homestead and his 1,400 acres of land was at the present Five Points. Gee was an early magistrate for the county.

On the family's plantation, Rush operated a mill, was a blacksmith, and farmed. He was also a manservant to Edmond Gee, John's son. Edmond practiced law and was a state representative from 1826 to 1828. Rush learned how to read and was often in Edmund's presence as he carried out the responsibilities of a lawyer and politician. Edmond died by 1830 and Rush became his brother's manservant. Trusted by the Gees, Rush had plantation oversight responsibilities. The plantation operated a wide range of activities from the house work to food processing and storage, like the milk house, smokehouse, pantry. There was also a toolhouse and storehouse.

The Gee family and their slaves attended the Ebenezer Baptist Church. Rush was baptized there about 1848. Beginning about 1860, he was given permission to be a slave deacon to the enslaved congregation. He provided support and religious education for other enslaved people. He and others transferred to a black church in Darlington in 1866. That year, land was donated by George W. Pettigrew for the Savannah Grove Baptist Church, where he became a deacon.

Rush was emancipated after the Civil War, but angry former Confederate soldiers and Democrats, led "a campaign of terror" in the post-war years.

Rush became a leader with political power. Jack Gee remained a friend and was Rush's employer after he was freed.

He married Aggy. In 1869, Rush purchased a plantation for himself in the Savannah Grove-Meadow Prong community. They had a son, Walter C. Rush, who became a teacher in Effingham in 1880.

== Legislator ==
Whites were divided by political partisanship and whether or not they served the Confederacy. During Reconstruction, voting was made legal for blacks, which gave them a numerical advantage. Rush ran as a state representative and was elected with the assistance of the Gee family. Politics changed considerably from the start of the Reconstruction era that followed the Civil War.

Rush represented Darlington County in the South Carolina House from 1868 until 1870 and from 1874 until his death in 1876. In 1868, there were four representatives from Darlington, three of whom were colored: Rush, John Boston, and Jordan Lang. The white representative was G. Holliman.

He supported education and taxation for South Carolina during the Reconstruction era, writing the language for the Constitution of South Carolina that would provide free education for all. His stances and actions would likely have angered some of his constituents.

== Assassination ==
He was assassinated May 13, 1876, when he and his wife were ambushed on the way home from an election campaign picnic at Mt. Carmel Church near Timmonsville. Just one-half mile from his home, Rush steered the horses and buggy so the horses could get a drink of water at a creek. He was shot in the heart with a gun and died instantly near Effingham in Florence County, South Carolina. Five other state legislators were killed before him during Reconstruction.

A letter was written by Benjamin Franklin Whittemore and sent to South Carolina governor Daniel Henry Chamberlain calling on him to offer a reward and send investigators. The officials from Darlington County also said "this was a cold blooded murder and our people are very much excited over it." The letter had seventeen signatures including government officials, the sheriff, and several judges. A reward of $400 (equivalent to $9,675 in 2025) was established. An investigation was performed, and a neighbor William D. Purvis was tried, but he was acquitted. Aggy identified a suspect, but the medical examiner's testimony contradicted her. A historical marker near the site of his murder commemorates his life.

== Legacy ==
The South Carolina House of Representatives adopted a bill on March 14, 2014 as a memorial to Alfred Rush and his efforts to pass a bill for free public education for all in South Carolina.

Alfred E. Rush Academy in Quinby, South Carolina is named for him.
