= Samuel J. Keith =

American politician

Samuel J. Keith (c. 1834–1916) was a state representative in South Carolina. He was a carpenter and served in the Confederate Army before entering politician life. He served as a Republican in the South Carolina House of Representatives during the Reconstruction era from 1870 to 1877, representing Darlington County, South Carolina. In 1878, he became a Democrat.
