= Jordan Lang =

American politician (c.1813–1893)

Jordan Lang (c. 1813 - March 9, 1893) was a state legislator in South Carolina during the Reconstruction era. He had been a slave owned by the Lang family. He served in the South Carolina House of Representatives from 1868 until 1872 representing Darlington County, South Carolina. Lang Township and a school were named for him. Lang Township preceded the Palmetto School District.

He married Kizzie Keith and had 10 children. He belonged to the Macedonia Baptist Church in Darlington.

He served with fellow African American state legislators representing Darlington John Boston and Alfred Rush as well as white legislator G. Holliman. Rush was ambushed and assassinated in 1867.

Lawrence Chesterfield Bryant wrote about Lang and other African American politicians in South Carolina in his 1974 book South Carolina Negro Legislators: A Glorious Success.

== See also ==
- African American officeholders from the end of the Civil War until before 1900
