= Benjamin Franklin Whittemore =

American politician (1824–1894)

Benjamin Whittemore
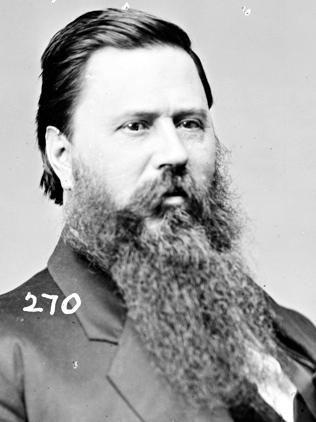

Member of the U.S. House of Representatives from South Carolina's 1st district
- In office July 18, 1868 – February 24, 1870
- Preceded by: John McQueen (1860)
- Succeeded by: Joseph Rainey

Member of the South Carolina Senate from the Darlington County district
- In office November 22, 1870 – June 9, 1877
- Preceded by: John Lunney
- Succeeded by: William Coker

Personal details
- Born: Benjamin Franklin Whittemore; May 18, 1824 Malden, Massachusetts, U.S.
- Died: January 25, 1894 (aged 69) Montvale, Massachusetts, U.S.
- Party: Republican
- Education: Amherst College

Military service
- Branch/service: United States Army (Union Army)
- Years of service: 1861–1865
- Unit: Army Chaplain Corps
- Battles/wars: American Civil War

Benjamin Franklin Whittemore (May 18, 1824 – January 25, 1894) was an American minister, politician, and publisher. After his theological studies, he was a minister and then a chaplain for Massachusetts regiments during the Civil War. Stationed in South Carolina at the war's end, he accepted the position of superintendent of education for the Freedmen's Bureau. A Republican, he was elected a U.S. representative from South Carolina. He was censured in 1870 for selling appointments to the United States Naval Academy and other military academies. He spent his later years in Massachusetts, where he was a publisher.

== Early life and education ==
Born in Malden, Massachusetts, Whittemore was the son of Susan Floyd and John Whittemore, who were married on June 22, 1823. They were both from Malden. He attended the public schools of Worcester and studied at Amherst College. Whittemore worked in mercantile establishments during the period in which he studied theology.

== Minister and chaplain ==
In 1859, he became a minister in the Methodist Episcopal Church of the New England Conference. During the Civil War, Whittemore served as chaplain of the 53rd Massachusetts Infantry Regiment, and later with the 30th Massachusetts Infantry Regiment, Veteran Volunteers.

== Freedmen's Bureau ==
When the war ended, he was stationed in the Darlington district in South Carolina, where he decided to stay. From 1865 to 1867, he held the position of superintendent of education for the Freedmen's Bureau. He established around 60 schools and churches, and met with freedmen and others in the community to develop educational programs. He founded the New Era, a weekly newspaper, in Darlington in 1865. He was editor in 1865, and James H. Norwood was the editor the following year. The paper was "devoted to the restoration, reconstruction, and union of the States". He also served on the Board of Regents of the Normal School from 1874 to 1877, located on the University of South Carolina campus.

== Career and resignation ==
He served as a delegate to the State constitutional convention in 1867 and was elected president of the Republican State executive board in 1867. He was elected to the South Carolina Senate in 1868 but resigned before the session to take a seat in Congress. He served as a delegate to the 1868 Republican National Convention. Upon the readmission of South Carolina to the Union, Whittemore was elected as a Republican to the Fortieth and Forty-first Congresses and served from July 18, 1868, to February 24, 1870, when he resigned under the eminent threat of expulsion from the House.

On February 24, 1870, the House of Representatives censured him for selling an appointment to the United States Naval Academy, United States Military Academy at West Point, and other military academies for up to $2,000 each appointment. He presented credentials of a second election to the same Congress on June 18, 1870, but the House declined to allow him to take his seat. Some of his constituents claimed they had a right to vote in whoever they wanted, as long as they "met the constitutional qualifications of citizenship, age, and residence." In response, Representative John A. Logan from Illinois stated that the House does have the right to reject a man of his character. "He is not merely a representative of the constituents who elect him, but his vote in this house is for the whole nation. If Congress shall not have the power to exclude a man of that kind, then the rights of the people of the whole country may be destroyed."

Whittemore was elected to the South Carolina Senate on November 22, 1870. He served until 1877 when he resigned.

=== Reconstruction era violence ===
After the assassinations of S. G. W. Dill (d. June 4, 1868) and B. F. Randolph (d. October 16, 1868), the Ku Klux Klan issued a letter that was printed in a newspaper warning Whittemore that he could meet the same fate as Dill, Randolph, and others. During the latter part of the Reconstruction era (1870 to 1877), there was increasing violence by Red Shirts, paramilitary insurgents who worked to suppress black voting. Democrats then regained power in the state legislature and began to pass laws to restrict voter registration and reduce the civil rights of freedmen. In 1876, South Carolina representative Alfred Rush, an African American freedman, was assassinated near his home in Darlington County. Whittemore wrote a letter to Governor Daniel Henry Chamberlain expressing concern. He asked for a reward and investigation. The letter was signed by 17 more people, including the local sheriff, two judges, and officials. A reward was offered, and an investigation was completed, but no one was found guilty.

== Later years ==
Whittemore returned to Massachusetts, settling in Woburn where he was a publisher.

== Personal life ==
Whittemore married Mandanna Dora (M. Dora) Stone, the daughter of George and Betsey Stone, on August 22, 1854, in Fitchburg, Massachusetts. Mandanna taught at the Fitchburg High School. They had two children.

By 1860, Rev. B.F. Whittemore was a member of a masonic lodge in Connecticut. He was initiated at the Hiram Lodge in Virginia in 1865 and transferred to the Mount Horeb Lodge in Woburn, Massachusetts on January 7, 1880.

His wife M. Dora Stone Whittemmore died in Woburn on June 7, 1872, at the age of 65. He died in Montvale, on January 25, 1894. He was interred in the Salem Street Cemetery in Woburn, as was his wife Mandanna (also Mandana) Dora Stone.

== See also ==
- List of United States representatives expelled, censured, or reprimanded

U.S. House of Representatives
Vacant Title last held by John McQueen; 1860	Member of the U.S. House of Representatives from South Carolina's 1st congressional district 1868–1870	Succeeded by Joseph Rainey
