= Solomon Dill =

Assassinated American Reconstruction politician

Solomon George Washington Dill (c. 1818 – 1868) was an abolitionist who served as a member of the South Carolina House of Representatives and a delegate of the state's 1868 Constitutional Convention. A white Republican, his supporters included many recently freed African Americans because of his liberal views on equality. He was murdered, likely by members of the Ku Klux Klan, due to his support of civil rights for African Americans.

== Political career ==
Dill was a controversial figure in Southern politics. He held openly anti-slavery views and advocated against propositions like literacy and property ownership as qualifications for voting, stating, “I do not believe that anybody with a Christian heart…would introduce such a bill…it is a fraud or a swindle.” After he publicly announced he was a Republican, he was consistently harassed, and even believed he would be murdered Dill had a friend stand guard outside of his house every night because of the constant death threats he would receive. Despite the criticism, he also had a large support base, mainly of freedmen. This support led to him being elected on April 14, 1868, to the State Legislature. He later ran for State Commissioner on June 2, 1868, and won that position posthumously.

Dill often gave speeches to freed people and others on the importance of patience and moderation. Opponents of Dill spread propaganda that he discussed hatred and advocated violence, but during the investigation of his murder, no evidence of those claims was found. After his murder, many of the local white population expected the African American residents to riot as a result. A few African Americans that were interviewed stated they did not because they believed Dill would not have wanted that. He had often preached about remaining peaceful and they “felt strongly that the guilty should suffer, but not the innocent.”

=== Constitutional Convention ===
Dill represented the state of South Carolina and helped draft the State Constitution of 1868. The state created a Constitution of 1865 but needed to be rewritten to accommodate for the 14th Amendment. After the federal passing of the 14th Amendment, South Carolina was mandated to ratify it and create a new constitution that allowed African Americans to vote. South Carolinians that could vote, including African Americans for the first time, selected delegates from their voting districts. Solomon Dill was one of the delegates chosen to help with the task because of his adamant anti-slavery views. The South Carolina Constitutional Convention of 1868 was the first convention to have African Americans participate in drafting the state constitution.

Dill and 123 other delegates met in Charleston, South Carolina, beginning on January 14, 1868, and lasted until March 17th, totaling 53 working days. Dill was part of the “Radical Republicans” within the convention, which equaled 63 of the delegates. Dill was one of only 13 whites that were a part of this group. Out of the 124 delegates, Dill was one of 48 white men, and the other 76 attendees were African American men.

== Murder ==
The Ku Klux Klan was founded in Tennessee in 1866, but by 1868 had established itself in South Carolina. South Carolina had an election in the Fall of 1868, and the KKK sought to intimidate and eliminate some of those who disagreed with their message. South Carolina saw a rise in violence that was a direct result of the upcoming election, though not all of it was organized by the KKK. Dill was one of three Republican politicians murdered in South Carolina that year while were running for office. At least 100 people were either murdered, beaten, or sexually assaulted between 1868 and 1871 because of their ethnicity or political views. While it isn't known if Dill's assassins were direct members of the KKK, the group's rapid growth and dissemination throughout the South represented an upward trend of violence toward African American and white sympathizers that were taking place throughout the South during this era.

On Thursday, June 4, 1868, Dill was at his home in Kershaw County with his wife, Rebecca Dill, and a friend, Nestor Ellison, an African American freedman, among other guests. Just after sunset at eight o’clock, a group went to his home and ended up shooting Dill in the cervical portion of the spine and Ellison in the head, killing both men. His wife was injured as well but survived. She told investigators they were sitting inside the house when an unknown gunman began firing shots into their home. Dill was hit immediately alongside Ellison, while Rebecca was shot as she was trying to escape.

== Investigation ==
In all, nine guests gave sworn testimonies from that night, but no killer was positively identified from the testimonies. The coroner, J.K. Witherspoon, examined Dill's body and concluded he died of homicide and reported that he died from two gunshot wounds.

After the community made limited and short-lived efforts to find Dill's killers, Army 1st Lieutenant George Price and a detachment of soldiers were sent to the town to investigate the murder further. Under the Reconstruction Acts enacted by Congress, federal military troops remained in charge of much of the Southern United States until the state could prove that they had met all of the qualifications to be self-governing. Because of this, Lt. Price headed the investigation into Solomon Dill's assassination. According to his investigation, Dill was native to South Carolina and had “a fair education” and “some property.”

A $10,000 reward was offered to anyone who gave information that led to the arrest of any of the murderers. Lt. Price ultimately concluded that ten shots were fired into the east door of the Dill residence the night of the 4th. By July 10, 11 men, all white, were arrested for the murder of Solomon Dill: Joseph Huckabee, William Nelson, George Mattox, John Picket, John Mickle, Abram Rabon, M. P. Kelly. William Kelly, Emmanuel, and William Parker, and Dr. John A Glenn. Samuel Mattox was also believed to have been involved, but was deemed too old to be placed in jail. He was allowed to return home where he could be cared for.

July 10 was also the last official report written by Lt. Price. After that, the murder suspects and all information about the investigation were handed over to the South Carolina Attorney General. Because of the constitutional convention, a new constitution was ratified and accepted by Congress, thus fulfilling South Carolina's requirements the federal government had imposed. South Carolina was allowed to regain its autonomy, and the military was pulled out of the state.

== Funeral ==
The Greenville Enterprise reported that Dill's funeral drew a large procession, almost exclusively of African Americans. The procession drew attention of the local authorities, multiple mourners were arrested. The Greenville Enterprise noted that arrests were made, but cast doubt on whether there was evidence against the "respectable white men" taken into custody.
