= Monroe Bell =

American politician

Monroe Bell (1826 or 1828/9 - 1900) was a laborer and state legislator who served in the Mississippi House of Representatives from 1872 until 1873.

== Biography ==
He was born in Mississippi either in 1826 or 1828/9.

Bell enlisted with the 5th U.S. Colored Heavy Artillery in November 1863 joining Company L and was made sergeant after serving just a month. A few months later in June 1864 he deserted.

He was a member of the Hinds County Board of Supervisors in 1870 and was elected to the Mississippi House of Representatives in 1871 serving one session from 1872 until 1873. He had been elected as a Radical and had been accused by legislator C. F. Norris of bribing member of the Radical party to support him.

He stood for Sheriff of Hinds County in September 1873 as the Republican nominee, but lost to William Jefferson who ran as an independent. Later the same year he was made major of the Hinds County militia.

He was tried in 1885 for attempting to poison his niece but his defense claimed it was only love powder "to kindle the ardent passion in her breast".

== See also ==
- African American officeholders from the end of the Civil War until before 1900
