= R. H. Isabelle =

Louisiana state legislator and military officer

Robert H. Isabelle was an influential figure in 19th-century Louisiana, known for his roles as a state legislator, a military officer in the United States Colored Infantry (USCI), and a pension agent in New Orleans. His contributions spanned various fields including education and military service.

== Military career ==
Isabelle served in the USCI, a branch of the Union Army composed of African-American soldiers during the American Civil War. His military service exemplified the significant role played by African Americans in the war effort.

== Political and civic engagement ==
Following his military service, Isabelle ventured into politics, serving as a state legislator in Louisiana. In addition to his legislative role, Isabelle was nominated and served as a pension agent in New Orleans. This position involved overseeing the distribution of pensions, particularly to war veterans, a vital role in the reconstruction era.

== Contribution to education ==
Isabelle made significant contributions to the field of education in Louisiana as the treasurer of the Third Ward School Board, highlighting his commitment to improving educational infrastructure and opportunities in the region.
