= Edward Charles Mickey =

American politician in South Carolina (born 1836)

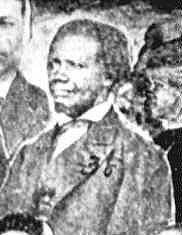

South Carolina House of Representatives
- In office 1868–1872

Personal details
- Born: January 3, 1836
- Died: Unknown

Edward Charles Mickey (January 3, 1836 - ?) was an American Reconstruction era legislator in South Carolina. His occupation was listed as tailor and minister. He served in the South Carolina House of Representatives from 1868 until 1872. He was one of many African American legislators who served as Republicans in South Carolina's House and Senate in 1868. He represented Charleston County. He was born in Charleston, South Carolina.
