= John W. Wyatt =

Union Army soldier

John W. Wyatt (b. 1831/2) was a soldier in the Union Army during the American Civil War, A.M.E. minister, delegate to Florida's 1868 Constitutional Convention, state legislator, county commissioner, and justice of the peace. He was described as being illiterate and an excellent orator.

Wyatt was elected to represent Leon County in the Florida House of Representatives from 1870 until 1874.

Wyatt chaired a legislative committee investigating a railroad's bonds in 1872. He also served on the Committee on Engrossed Bills.

== See also ==
- African American officeholders from the end of the Civil War until before 1900
