= Aesop Goodson =

American politician

South Carolina House of Representatives

Aesop Goodson was a state legislator and judge in South Carolina.

He served in the South Carolina House of Representatives. He was removed from his position as a trial justice by the governor and alleged it was because he treated people fairly without regard to color. He and others formed the American Union Literary Club in 1872. He was African American.

His children included Napoleon Goodson and Thaddeus "Tad" Goodson (1869 - 1957). Thaddeus along with Scipio Shiver provided a White folklorist with folk tales he published.
