= Phillip Carroll =

American politician

Member of the Florida House of Representatives
- In office 1881–1883

Personal details
- Born: March 1847 Maryland, U.S.
- Died: Unknown

Phillip Carroll (born March 1847) was an American politician. He served as a member of the Florida House of Representatives.

== Life and career ==
Carroll was born in Maryland. He was a farmer.

In 1881, Carroll was elected to the Florida House of Representatives, representing Leon County, Florida, serving until 1883.

He was living in Tallahassee in 1920.
