= Samuel Blandon =

American politician (1846–??)

Samuel Blandon (born 1846) was a farmer and politician in Alabama. He was born in South Carolina. He was elected in 1867 as a delegate to represent Lee County, Alabama in the Alabama Constitutional Convention. He is commemorated along with other black legislators who served during the period 1870-1879 in the Alabama legislature. He served one term in the Alabama House of Representatives in 1868.

== See also ==
- African American officeholders from the end of the Civil War until before 1900
