= Henry Burckmeyer =

American politician

Henry Z. Burckmeyer was an American politician. He was a state legislator in South Carolina. He represented Charleston County as an Independent in the South Carolina House of Representatives from 1874 to 1876. He was documented as a merchant who was free before the American Civil War. He has been described as "mullato".

He and other African-American political leaders in South Carolina were honoured in a 2019 / 2020 resolution.

== See also ==
- African American officeholders from the end of the Civil War until before 1900
