= Birch Gibson =

American politician

Birch Gibson (c. 1828 - September 10, 1895) was a state legislator and local official in Ocala, Florida. He was one of several African Americans to represent Marion County, Florida in the Florida House of Representatives during the Reconstruction era in 1872. He was elected in 1873. He served as on the Ocala City Council, in the state House, and as a justice of the peace.

He was born in Alabama.

== See also ==
- African American officeholders from the end of the Civil War until before 1900
