= Nathaniel T. Spencer =

American politician

Nathaniel T. Spencer (1844 - ?) was a tailor, minister, and politician in South Carolina. He was born in South Carolina and was enslaved. He served in the South Carolina House of Representatives from 1872 to 1874. He enrolled in the University of South Carolina's medical school. He was one of the founders of the Reform Apollo Society of Charleston. In 2019, he and other African Americans who served in South Carolina's legislature were honored in a resolution.
