= Merriman Howard =

American politician

Merriman Howard was a state legislator and sheriff in Mississippi. He served as sheriff in Jefferson County, Mississippi.

He was born in Mississippi. He was enslaved by owner Wade Harrison.

He was a trustee of Shaw University. He was also a trustee of newly established Alcorn University. His son was one of the first "colored" candidates appointed to West Point. He eventually moved to Washington, D.C., and worked for the U.S. Treasury.
