= Scipio Jasper =

American politician

T. Scipio Jasper (born c. 1815) was an American state legislator in Florida. He was one of several African American members of the Florida House of Representatives who served in the body for Marion County, Florida and lived in Ocala, Florida during the Reconstruction era.

Jasper was born a slave in South Carolina. He served in the Florida House in 1872 and 1873.

== See also ==
- African American officeholders from the end of the Civil War until before 1900
