= Shadrack Morgan =

South Carolinian politician

South Carolina House of Representatives

Shadrach Morgan, sometimes written Shadrack Morgan, was a member of the South Carolina House of Representatives during the Reconstruction era. His grandson had the same name graduated from Howard University and became a Civil Rights lawyer in South Carolina. The younger Shadrach also studied at South Carolina State University and helped register African Americans for selective service during World War II.
