= Guy Powell =

American politician

Guy Powell (1851–1900) was a pastor and state legislator in Virginia. He served in the Senate of Virginia from 1875 to 1879 and in the Virginia House of Delegates from 1881 to 1883.

He married Mary Ann Rylan January 27, 1869.

== See also ==
- African American officeholders from the end of the Civil War until before 1900
