= Singleton Coleman =

American politician

Singleton H. Coleman was a clergyman and state legislator in Florida. He served in the Florida House of Representatives from Marion County, Florida. He was a member of the Florida House in 1873 and 1874 during the Reconstruction era.

== See also ==
- African American officeholders from the end of the Civil War until before 1900
