= Abram Dannerly =

American politician

South Carolina House of Representatives
- In office 1872–1874

Personal details
- Born: October 1845

Abram Dannerly was an American politician. He was a member of the South Carolina House of Representatives during the Reconstruction era. He represented Orangeburg. He was expelled in 1874.
