= George Maxwell Mears =

American politician from South Carolina

George Maxwell Mears was an American politician. He was a member of the South Carolina House of Representatives in 1884 and 1885, as well as 1886 and 1887. He was born in Charleston.
