= Manly Wynne =

Alabama state legislator (1874 to 1876)

Manly Wynne was an American state legislator in Alabama. He served in the Alabama House of Representatives from 1874 until 1876.
