= Ellis Forrest =

American politician

South Carolina House of Representatives

Ellis Forrest was a member of the South Carolina House of Representatives during the Reconstruction era. He represented Orangeburg.
