= Ida B. Wells =

American journalist and civil rights activist (1862–1931)

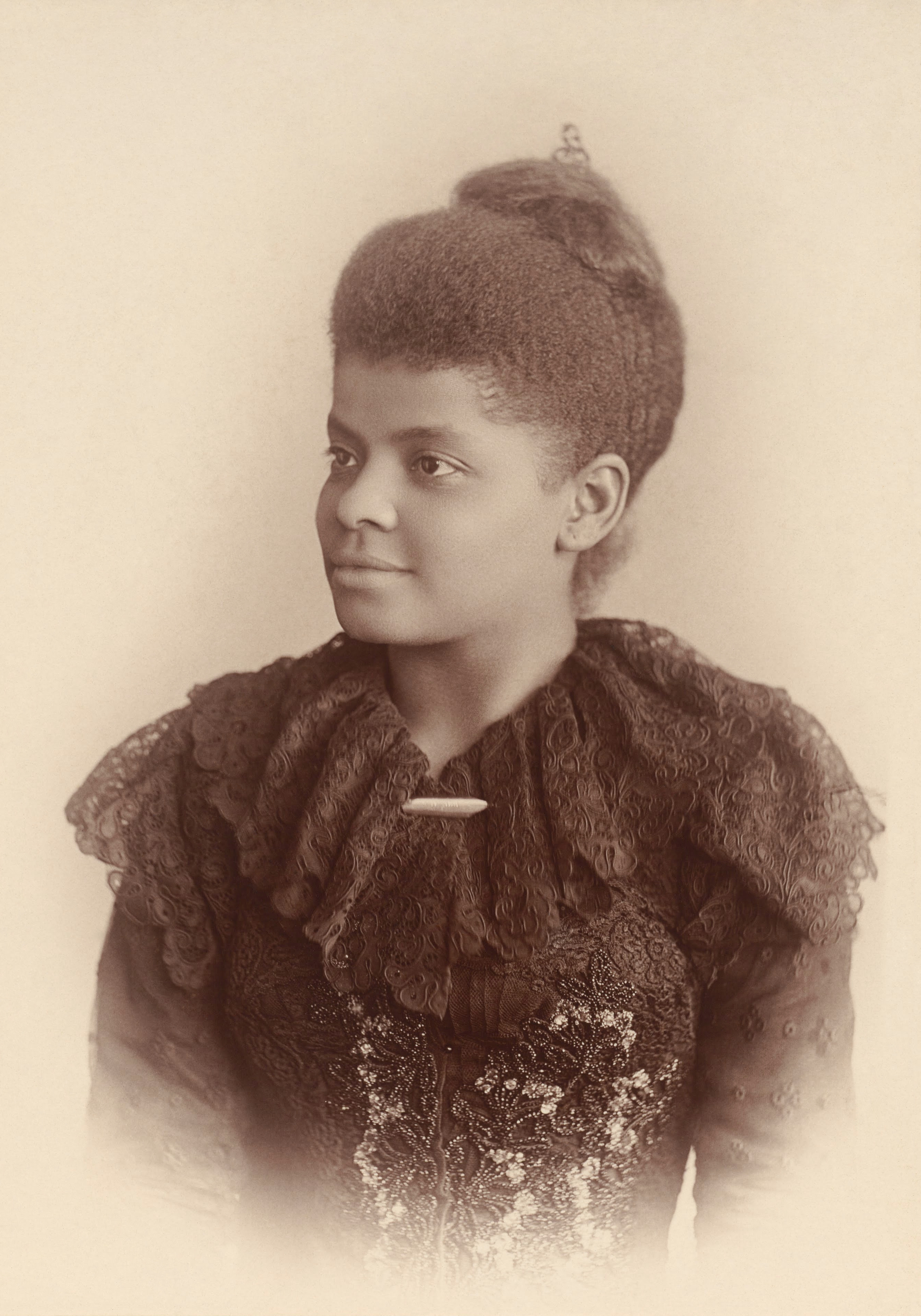
- Wells, c. 1893
- Born: Ida Bell Wells; July 16, 1862; Holly Springs, Mississippi, C.S.
- Died: March 25, 1931 (aged 68); Chicago, Illinois, U.S.
- Burial place: Oak Woods Cemetery
- Other names: Ida B. Wells-Barnett; Iola (pen name)
- Education: Rust College; Fisk University; LeMoyne-Owen College
- Occupations: Civil rights and women's rights activist; journalist and newspaper editor; teacher
- Political party: Republican
- Other political affiliations: Independent (1930)
- Spouse: Ferdinand L. Barnett (m. 1895)
- Children: 4, including Alfreda Duster

Ida Bell Wells-Barnett (July 16, 1862 – March 25, 1931) was an American investigative journalist, sociologist, educator, and early leader in the civil rights movement. She was one of the founders of the National Association for the Advancement of Colored People (NAACP). Wells dedicated her career to combating prejudice and violence, and advocating for African-American equality—especially for women.

Throughout the 1890s, Wells documented lynching of African-Americans in the United States in articles and through pamphlets such as Southern Horrors: Lynch Law in all its Phases and The Red Record, which debunked the fallacy frequently voiced by whites at the time – that all Black lynching victims were guilty of crimes. Wells exposed the brutality of lynching, and analyzed its sociology, arguing that whites used lynching to terrorize African Americans in the South because they represented economic and political competition—and thus a threat of loss of power—for whites. She aimed to demonstrate the truth about this violence and advocate for measures to stop it.

Wells was born into slavery in Holly Springs, Mississippi. She was freed as an infant under the Emancipation Proclamation, when Union Army troops captured Holly Springs. At the age of 16, she lost both her parents and her infant brother in the 1878 yellow fever epidemic. She got a job teaching and kept the rest of the family together with the help of her grandmother, later moving with some of her siblings to Memphis, Tennessee. Soon, Wells co-owned and wrote for the Memphis Free Speech and Headlight newspaper, where her reporting covered incidents of racial segregation and inequality. Eventually, her investigative journalism was carried nationally in Black-owned newspapers. Subjected to continued threats and criminal violence, including when a white mob destroyed her newspaper office and presses, Wells left Memphis for Chicago, Illinois. She married Ferdinand L. Barnett in 1895 and had a family while continuing her work writing, speaking, and organizing for civil rights and the women's movement for the rest of her life.

Wells was outspoken regarding her beliefs as a Black female activist and faced regular public disapproval, sometimes including from other leaders within the civil rights movement and the women's suffrage movement. She was active in women's rights and the women's suffrage movement, establishing several notable women's organizations. A skilled and persuasive speaker, Wells traveled nationally and internationally on lecture tours. Wells died on March 25, 1931, in Chicago, and in 2020 was posthumously honored with a Pulitzer Prize special citation "for her outstanding and courageous reporting on the horrific and vicious violence against African Americans during the era of lynching."

== Early life ==
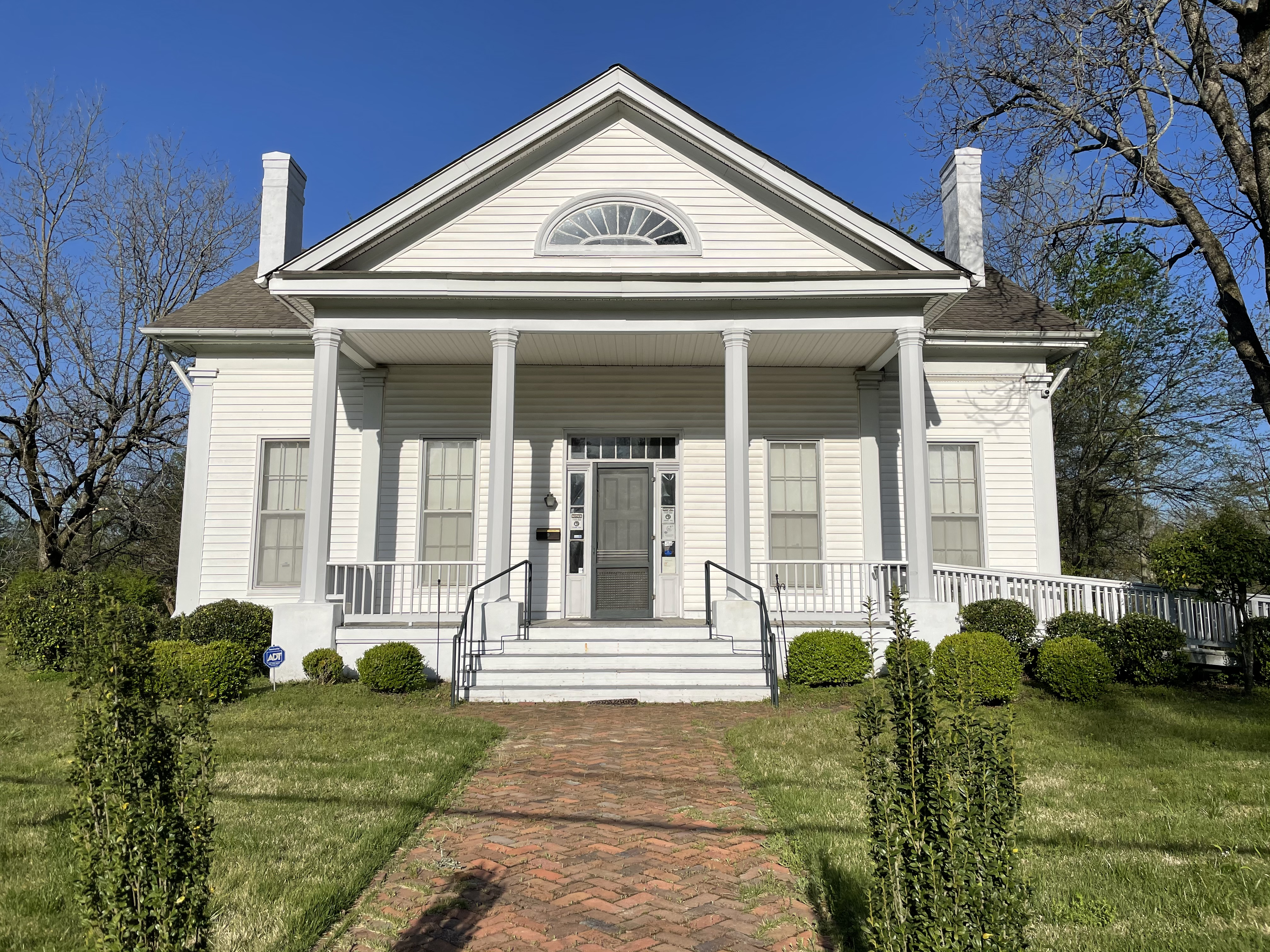
The Bolling–Gatewood House. The Wells family lived in slave quarters located behind the house of Spires Boling while enslaved to him, now a museum focused on Wells

Ida Bell Wells was born on the Boling Farm near Holly Springs, Mississippi. Born on July 16, 1862, Ida Wells was the first child of James Madison Wells (1840–1878) and Elizabeth "Lizzie" (Warrenton). James Wells was born to an enslaved woman named Peggy and Peggy's white enslaver, thus he was enslaved under the doctrine of partus sequitur ventrem. When James was 18, his father brought him to Holly Springs, hiring him out as a carpenter's apprentice to architect Spires Boling, with James's wages going to his enslaver. One of ten children born on a plantation in Virginia, Lizzie was abducted and trafficked away from her family and siblings and tried without success to locate her family following the Civil War. Lizzie was owned by Boling for domestic labor in his home, now the Bolling–Gatewood House. Before the Emancipation Proclamation was issued, both of Wells's parents were enslaved to Boling, and thus Ida was also born enslaved. James Wells built much of the Bolling–Gatewood house, in which Boling lived, and which in March 2002 became the Ida B. Wells–Barnett Museum. The Wells family lived elsewhere on the property. Ground plans on display in the Ida B. Wells–Barnett Museum identify shacks behind the house as the residence of the Wells family.

After emancipation, James became a trustee of the newly established Shaw University (now Rust College) in Holly Springs. He refused to vote for Democratic candidates during the period of Reconstruction, became a member of the Loyal League, and was known as a "race man" for his involvement in politics and his commitment to the Republican Party. He founded a successful carpentry business in Holly Springs in 1867, and his wife Lizzie became known as a "famous cook".

Ida B. Wells was one of their eight children, and she enrolled in Shaw University. In September 1878, both of Ida's parents died during a yellow fever epidemic that also claimed one of her brothers. Wells had been visiting her grandmother's farm near Holly Springs at the time and was spared.

Following the funerals of her parents and brother, friends and relatives decided that the five remaining Wells children should be separated and sent to foster homes. Wells resisted this proposition. To keep her younger siblings together as a family, she found work as a teacher in a rural Black elementary school outside Holly Springs. Her paternal grandmother, Peggy Wells (née Peggy Cheers; 1814–1887), along with other friends and relatives, stayed with her siblings and cared for them during the week while Wells was teaching.

About two years after, Wells's grandmother (Peggy) had a stroke and her sister Eugenia died, Wells and her two youngest sisters moved to Memphis to live with an aunt, Fanny Butler (née Fanny Wells; 1837–1908), in 1883. Memphis is about 56 miles (90 km) from Holly Springs.

== Early career and anti-segregation activism ==
Soon after moving to Memphis, Tennessee, Wells was hired in Woodstock by the Shelby County school system. During her summer vacations, she attended summer sessions at Fisk University, a historically Black college in Nashville, Tennessee. She also attended LeMoyne–Owen College, a historically Black college in Memphis. She held strong political opinions and provoked many people with her views on women's rights. At the age of 24, she wrote: "I will not begin at this late day by doing what my soul abhors; sugaring men, weak deceitful creatures, with flattery to retain them as escorts or to gratify a revenge."

. . . It is with no pleasure that I have dipped my hands in the corruption here exposed ... Somebody must show that the Afro-American race is more sinned against than sinning, and it seems to have fallen upon me to do so.

— Ida B. Wells (1892)

On September 15, 1883, and again on May 4, 1884, a train conductor with the Chesapeake and Ohio Railway ordered Wells to give up her seat in the first-class ladies car and move to the smoking car, which was already crowded with other passengers. In 1883, the United States Supreme Court had ruled against the federal Civil Rights Act of 1875 (which had banned racial discrimination in public accommodations). This verdict supported railroad companies that chose to racially segregate their passengers. When Wells refused to give up her seat on September 15, the conductor and two men dragged her out of the car. Wells gained publicity in Memphis when she wrote a newspaper article for The Living Way, a Black church weekly, about her treatment on the train. In Memphis, she hired an African-American attorney to sue the railroad. When her lawyer was paid off by the railroad, she hired a white attorney.

Wells won her case on December 24, 1884, when the local circuit court granted her a $500 (~$17,917 in 2025) award. The railroad company appealed to the Tennessee Supreme Court, which reversed the lower court's ruling in 1887. It concluded: "We think it is evident that the purpose of the defendant in error was to harass with a view to this suit, and that her persistence was not in good faith to obtain a comfortable seat for the short ride." Wells was ordered to pay court costs. Her reaction to the higher court's decision revealed her strong convictions on civil rights and religious faith, as she responded: "I felt so disappointed because I had hoped such great things from my suit for my people. ... O God, is there no ... justice in this land for us?"

While continuing to teach elementary school, Wells became increasingly active as a journalist and writer. She accepted an editorial position for a small Memphis journal, the Evening Star, and she began writing weekly articles for The Living Way newspaper under the pen name "Iola". Articles she wrote under her pen name attacked racist Jim Crow policies. In 1889, she became editor and co-owner with J. L. Fleming of The Free Speech and Headlight, a Black-owned newspaper established by the Reverend Taylor Nightingale (1844–1922) and based at the Beale Street Baptist Church in Memphis.

In 1891, Wells was dismissed from her teaching post by the Memphis Board of Education due to her articles criticizing conditions in the Black schools of the region. She was devastated but undaunted, and concentrated her energy on writing articles for The Living Way and the Free Speech and Headlight.

== Anti-lynching campaign and investigative journalism ==
=== The lynching at The Curve in Memphis ===
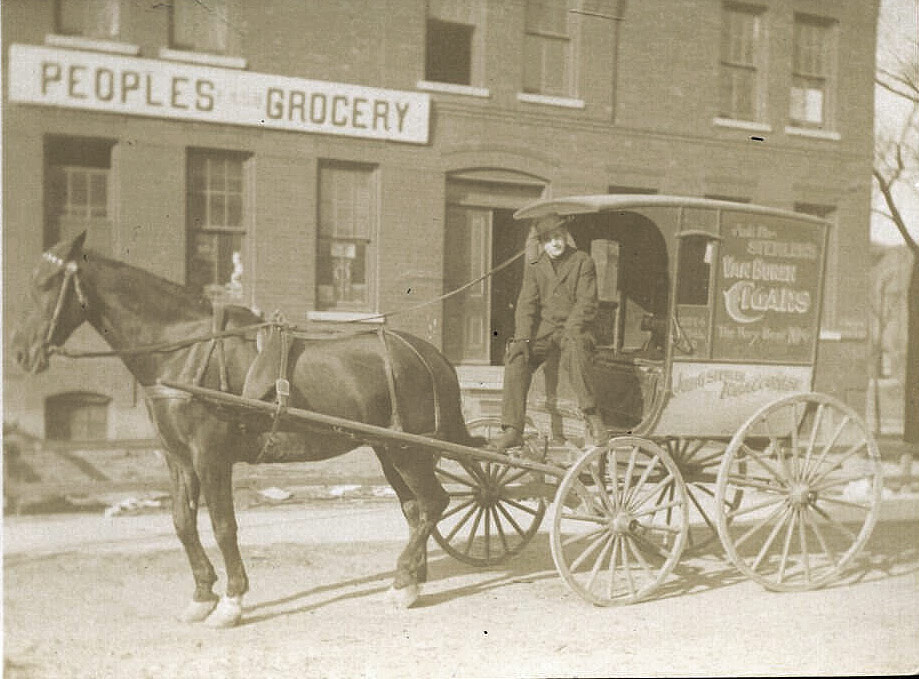
The People's Grocery near Memphis, Tennessee, was a successful African-American cooperative. The 1892 lynchings of its owners led Wells to begin her investigations of lynching.

In 1889, Thomas Henry Moss Sr. (1853–1892), an African American, opened People's Grocery, which he co-owned. The store was located in a South Memphis neighborhood nicknamed "The Curve". Wells was close to Moss and his family, having stood as godmother to his first child, Maurine E. Moss (1891–1971). Moss's store did well and competed with a white-owned grocery store across the street, Barrett's Grocery, owned by William Russell Barrett (1854–1920).

On March 2, 1892, a young Black male youth named Armour Harris was playing a game of marbles with a young white male youth named Cornelius Hurst in front of the People's Grocery. The two male youths got into an argument during the game, then began to fight. As the Black youth, Harris, seemed to be winning the fight, the father of Cornelius Hurst intervened and began to "thrash" Harris. The People's Grocery employees William Stewart and Calvin R. McDowell (1870–1892) saw the fight and rushed outside to defend the young Harris from the adult Hurst as people in the neighborhood gathered into what quickly became a "racially charged mob".

The white grocer Barrett returned the following day, March 3, 1892, to the People's Grocery with a Shelby County Sheriff's Deputy, looking for William Stewart. Calvin McDowell, who greeted Barrett, indicated that Stewart was not present, but Barrett was dissatisfied with the response and was frustrated that the People's Grocery was competing with his store. Angry about the previous day's mêlée, Barrett responded that "Blacks were thieves" and hit McDowell with a pistol. McDowell wrestled the gun away and fired at Barrett—missing narrowly. McDowell was later arrested but subsequently released.

On March 5, 1892, a group of six white men including a sheriff's deputy took electric streetcars to the People's Grocery. The group of white men were met by a barrage of bullets from the People's Grocery, and Shelby County Sheriff Deputy Charley Cole was wounded, as well as civilian Bob Harold. Hundreds of Whites were deputized almost immediately to put down what was perceived by the local Memphis newspapers Commercial and Appeal-Avalanche as an armed rebellion by Black men in Memphis. Thomas Moss, a postman in addition to being the owner of the People's Grocery, was named as a conspirator along with McDowell and Stewart. The three men were arrested and jailed pending trial.

Around 3:25 a.m. on the morning of March 9, 1892, a mob of approximately seventy-five masked men gained entry to the Shelby County Jail by ringing the bell and giving the name of a well-known officer, tricking the watchman into opening the outer door. The men seized and bound the watchman, then located and took Moss, McDowell, and Stewart from their cells. The mob carried the three men to an open field near Wolf River, about a quarter mile from the jail, where their gags were removed and they were allowed to speak for the first time. Just before they were shot, Moss said: "If you are going to kill us, turn our faces to the west." The mob then shot all three men to death and dispersed as quietly as it had assembled. The Memphis Appeal-Avalanche reports: Just before he was killed, Moss said to the mob: "Tell my people to go west, there is no justice here."

After the lynching of her friends, Wells wrote in Free Speech and Headlight urging Blacks to leave Memphis altogether:

There is, therefore, only one thing left to do; save our money and leave a town which will neither protect our lives and property, nor give us a fair trial in the courts, but takes us out and murders us in cold blood when accused by white persons.

Shelby County Sheriff McLendon, when asked if he would attempt to arrest the ringleaders, replied: "Yes, of course; my oath of office compels it, and I will take a posse out and do all I can." The event led Wells to begin investigating lynchings. She began to interview people associated with lynchings, including a lynching in Tunica, Mississippi, in 1892 where she concluded that the father of a young white woman had implored a lynch mob to kill a Black man with whom his daughter was having a sexual relationship, under a pretense "to save the reputation of his daughter". In a 1909 speech at the National Negro Conference, Wells said:

During the last ten years from 1899 to 1908 inclusive the number lynched was 959. Of this number 102 were white, while the colored victims numbered 857. No other nation, civilized or savage, burns its criminals; only under that Stars and Stripes is the human holocaust possible. Twenty-eight human beings burned at the stake, one of them a woman and two of them children, is the awful indictment against American civilization—the gruesome tribute which the nation pays to the color line.

=== Free Speech newspaper destroyed by a mob ===
Wells's anti-lynching commentaries in the Free Speech had been building, particularly with respect to lynchings and imprisonment of Black men suspected of raping White women. A story was published on January 16, 1892, in the Cleveland Gazette, describing a wrongful conviction for a sexual affair between a married White woman, Julia Underwood (née Julie Caroline Wells), and a single Black man, William Offet (1854–1914) of Elyria, Ohio. Offet was convicted of rape and served four years of a 15-year sentence, despite his sworn denial of rape. Underwood's husband, Rev. Isaac T. Underwood – after she confessed to him that she had lied two years later – diligently worked to get Offet out of the penitentiary. After hiring an influential Pittsburgh attorney, Thomas Harlan Baird Patterson (1844–1907), Rev. Underwood prevailed, Offet was released and subsequently pardoned by the Ohio Governor.

Dear Miss Wells:
Thank you for your faithful paper on the lynch abomination now generally practiced against colored people in the South. There has been no word equal to it in convincing power. I have spoken, but my word is feeble in comparison ... Brave woman! ...

— Frederick Douglass (October 25, 1892)

On May 21, 1892, Wells published an editorial in the Free Speech refuting what she called "that old threadbare lie that Negro men rape white women. If Southern men are not careful, a conclusion might be reached which will be very damaging to the moral reputation of their women."

Four days later, on May 25, The Daily Commercial wrote: "The fact that a Black scoundrel [Ida B. Wells] is allowed to live and utter such loathsome and repulsive calumnies is a volume of evidence as to the wonderful patience of Southern Whites. But we've had enough of it." The Evening Scimitar (Memphis) copied the story that same day, and added: "Patience under such circumstances is not a virtue. If the Negroes themselves do not apply the remedy without delay it will be the duty of those whom he has attacked to tie the wretch who utters these calumnies to a stake at the intersection of Main and Madison Sts., brand him in the forehead with a hot iron and perform upon him a surgical operation with a pair of tailor's shears."

A White mob ransacked the Free Speech office, destroying the building and its contents. James L. Fleming, co-owner with Wells and business manager, was forced to flee Memphis; and, reportedly, the trains were being watched for Wells's return. Creditors took possession of the office and sold the assets of the Free Speech. Wells had been out of town, vacationing in Manhattan; she never returned to Memphis. A "committee" of White businessmen, reportedly from the Cotton Exchange, located Rev. Nightingale and, although he had sold his interest to Wells and Fleming in 1891, assaulted him and forced him at gunpoint to sign a letter retracting the May 21 editorial.

Wells subsequently accepted a job with The New York Age and continued her anti-lynching campaign from New York. For the next three years, she resided in Harlem, initially as a guest at the home of Timothy Thomas Fortune (1856–1928) and wife, Carrie Fortune (née Caroline Charlotte Smiley; 1860–1940).

According to Kenneth W. Goings, no copy of the Memphis Free Speech survives. The only knowledge of the newspaper ever existing comes from reprinted articles in other archived newspapers.

=== Southern Horrors (1892) ===
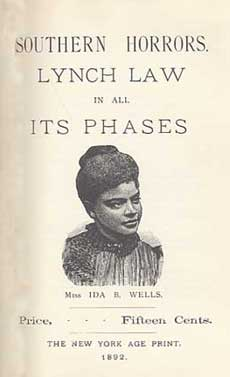
Cover of Southern Horrors: Lynch Law in All Its Phases

On October 26, 1892, Wells began to publish her research on lynching in a pamphlet titled Southern Horrors: Lynch Law in All Its Phases. Having examined many accounts of lynchings due to the alleged "rape of white women", she concluded that Southerners accused Black men of rape to hide their real reasons for lynchings: Black economic progress, which white Southerners saw as a threat to their own economic progress, and white ideas of enforcing Black second-class status in the society. Black economic progress was a contemporary issue in the South, and in many states whites worked to suppress Black progress. In this period at the turn of the century, Southern states, starting with Mississippi in 1890, passed laws and/or new constitutions to disenfranchise most Black people and many poor white people through use of poll taxes, literacy tests and other devices.

Wells, in Southern Horrors, adopted the phrase "poor, blind Afro-American Sampsons" to denote Black men as victims of "white Delilahs". The Biblical "Samson", in the vernacular of the day, came from Longfellow's 1865 poem, "The Warning", containing the line: "There is a poor, blind Samson in the land ... " To explain the metaphor "Sampson", John Elliott Cairnes, an Irish political economist, in his 1865 article about Black suffrage, wrote that Longfellow was prophesizing; to wit: in "the long-impending struggle for Americans following the Civil War, [he, Longfellow] could see in the Negro only an instrument of vengeance, and a cause of ruin".

=== A Red Record (1895) ===
After conducting further research, Wells published A Red Record, in 1895. This 100-page pamphlet was a sociological investigation of lynching in the United States since the Emancipation Proclamation of 1863. It also covered Black people's struggles in the South since the Civil War. A Red Record explored the alarmingly high rates of lynching in the United States (which was at a peak from 1880 to 1930). Wells said that during Reconstruction, most Americans outside the South did not realize the growing rate of violence against Black people in the South. She believed that during slavery, white people had not committed as many attacks because of the economic labor value of slaves. Wells commented that "ten thousand Negroes have been killed in cold blood, [through lynching] without the formality of judicial trial and legal execution" since 1865, the final year of the civil war.

Frederick Douglass had written an article noting three eras of "Southern barbarism" and the excuses that whites claimed in each period.

Wells explored these in her A Red Record:

- During the time of enslavement, she observed that whites worked to "repress and stamp out alleged 'race riots'" or suspected rebellions by the abducted, usually killing Black people in far higher proportions than any white casualties. Once the Civil War ended, white people feared Black people, who were in the majority in many areas. White people acted to control them and suppress them by violence.
- During the Reconstruction Era white people murdered Black people as part of mob efforts to suppress Black political activity and re-establish white supremacy after the war. They feared so-called "Negro Domination" through voting and taking office. Wells urged Black people in high-risk areas to move away to protect their families.
- She observed that whites frequently claimed that Black men had "to be killed to avenge their assaults upon women". She said that white people falsely assumed that any relationship between a white woman and a Black man was a result of rape. But, given power dynamics, it was much more common for white men to take sexual advantage of poor Black women. She stated: "Nobody in this section of the country believes the old threadbare lie that Black men rape white women." Wells connected lynching to sexual violence, showing how the myth of the Black man's lust for white women led to the murder of African-American men.

Wells collected 14 pages of statistics related to lynching cases committed from 1892 to 1895; she also included pages of graphic accounts detailing specific lynchings. She wrote that her data was taken from articles by white correspondents, white press bureaus, and white newspapers. Her delivery of these statistics did not simply reduce the murders to numbers, Wells strategically paired the data with descriptive accounts in a way that helped her audience conceptualize the scale of the injustice. This powerful quantification captivated Black and White audiences about the horrors of lynching, through both her circulated works and public oration.

Southern Horrors and A Red Record's documentation of lynchings captured the attention of Northerners who knew little about these mob murders or accepted the common explanation that Black men deserved this fate.

According to the Equal Justice Initiative, 4,084 African Americans were murdered in the South, alone, between 1877 and 1950, of which, 25 percent were accused of sexual assault and nearly 30 percent, murder. Generally southern states and white juries refused to indict any perpetrators for lynching, although they were frequently known and sometimes shown in the photographs being made more frequently of such events.

Despite Wells's attempt to gain support among white Americans against mob murders, she believed that her campaign could not overturn the economic interests whites had in using lynching as an instrument to maintain Southern order and discourage Black economic ventures. Ultimately, Wells concluded that appealing to reason and compassion would not succeed in gaining criminalization of lynching by Southern whites. In response to the extreme violence perpetrated upon Black Americans, Wells concluded that armed resistance was a reasonable and effective means to defend against lynching. She said, a "Winchester rifle should have a place of honor in every black home."

=== Speaking tours in Britain ===
Wells travelled twice to Britain in her campaign against lynching, the first time in 1893 and the second in 1894 in effort to gain the support of a powerful white nation such as Britain to shame and sanction the racist practices of the United States. She and her supporters in America saw these tours as an opportunity for her to reach larger, white audiences with her anti-lynching campaign, something she had been unable to accomplish in America. In these travels, Wells notes that her own transatlantic voyages in themselves held a powerful cultural context given the histories of the Middle Passage, and black female identity within the dynamics of segregation. She found sympathetic audiences in Britain, already shocked by reports of lynching in America. Wells had been invited for her first British speaking tour by Catherine Impey and Isabella Fyvie Mayo. Impey, a Quaker abolitionist who published the journal Anti-Caste, had attended several of Wells's lectures while traveling in America. Mayo was a writer and poet who wrote under the name of Edward Garrett. Both women had read of the particularly gruesome mob murder of Henry Smith in Texas and wanted to organize a speaking tour to call attention to American lynchings.

Impey and Mayo asked Frederick Douglass to make the trip, but he declined, citing his age and health. He then suggested Wells, who enthusiastically accepted the invitation. In 1894, before leaving the US for her second visit to Great Britain, Wells called on William Penn Nixon, the editor of the Daily Inter-Ocean, a Republican newspaper in Chicago. It was the only major white paper that persistently denounced lynching. After she told Nixon about her planned tour, he asked her to write for the newspaper while in England. She was the first African-American woman to be a paid correspondent for a mainstream white newspaper.

Wells toured England, Scotland, with Eliza Wigham in attendance and Wales for two months, addressing audiences of thousands, and rallying a moral crusade among the British. She relied heavily on her pamphlet Southern Horrors in her first tour, and showed shocking photographs of lynchings in America. On May 17, 1894, she spoke in Birmingham, West Midlands, at the Young Men's Christian Assembly and at Central Hall, staying in Edgbaston at 66 Gough Road. On June 25, 1894, at Bradford she gave a "sensational address, though in a quiet and restrained manner".

=== British Anti-Lynching Committee ===
On the last night of her second tour, the British Anti-Lynching Committee was established – reportedly the first anti-lynching organization in the world.

Its members included prominent public figures such as the Rt. Hon. John Campbell, 9th Duke of Argyll (K.G., K.T.), Rt. Hon. Sir John Eldon Gorst (M.P. for Cambridge), the Archbishop of Canterbury, Edward White Benson. In addition to Gorst, approximately twenty more Members of Parliament from across the United Kingdom and Ireland joined the committee, including Dadabhai Naoroji (Finsbury Central), Charles Diamond (Manchester North), Thomas Burt (Morpeth), Joseph Pease (South Durham), John Wilson (Glasgow Govan), and Alfred Webb (West Waterford).

The committee also included influential clergy, including Rev. John Clifford, D.D., Rev. Christopher Newman Hall, D.D., Rev. Robert Forman Horton, D.D., Rev. Philip Henry Wicksteed (and his wife, Mrs. Wicksteed; née Emily Solly), Rev. Joseph Estlin Carpenter, Rev. William Fiddian Moulton, D.D., and Moncure Daniel Conway (American abolitionist minister and radical writer).

Journalist on the Committee included Sir Edward Russell (editor of the Liverpool Daily Post), Percy William Bunting (editor of The Contemporary Review), Peter William Clayden (1827–1902) (night editor of the Daily News), Alfred Ewen Fletcher (editor of the Daily Chronicle), Charles Prestwich Scott (editor of the Manchester Guardian), and William Pollard Byles (M.P. for Shipley and editor of the Bradford Observer; and his wife, Mrs. Byles, née Sarah Anne Unwin).

Suffragists and social reformers on the Committee included Mrs. Harriot Stanton-Blatch (aka Harriot Eaton Blatch or Harriot Stanton Blatch; née Stanton), Miss Isabella Ormston Ford (1855–1924) (Leeds), Mrs. Spence Watson (née Elizabeth Richardson), Mrs. Jacob Bright (aka Ursula Bright, née Ursula Mellor), Miss Eliza Wigham (Edinburgh), and Lady Henry Somerset.

Scholars included Professor James Stuart (M.P. for Sunderland; and his wife, Mrs. Stuart; née Laura Elizabeth Colman, daughter of Jeremiah James Colman). Physicians included Oguntola Odunbaku Sapara, M.D.

Miss Florence Balgarnie served as the committee's honorary secretary and John Passmore Edwards, a journalist (part owner of the Weekly Times of London and The Echo; and former Member of Parliament for Salisbury, served as Treasurer.

As a result of her two lecture tours in Britain, Wells received significant coverage in the British and American press. Many of the articles published by the latter at the time of her return to the United States were hostile personal critiques, rather than reports of her anti-lynching positions and beliefs. The New York Times, for example, called her "a slanderous and nasty-minded Mulatress". Despite these attacks from the American press, Wells had nevertheless gained extensive recognition and credibility, and an international audience of supporters for her cause. On her return to New York, Wells described her reception in England: "Everywhere I was received on a perfect equality with the ladies who did so much for me and my cause. In fact, my color gave me some agreeable prominence which I might not otherwise have had." Favorable coverage of her tour appeared in the London Chronicle, the Lancaster Era, the London Daily News, and the Bristol Mercury, among other British publications. Wells's tours in Britain even influenced public opinion to the extent that British textile manufacturers fought back with economic strategies, imposing a temporary boycott on Southern cotton that pressured southern businessmen to condemn the practice of lynching publicly. Wells also persuaded the labor organizations of Leeds and Bradford to pass resolutions stating they would dissuade their members from emigrating to the Southern states until lynching ceased.

== Marriage and family ==
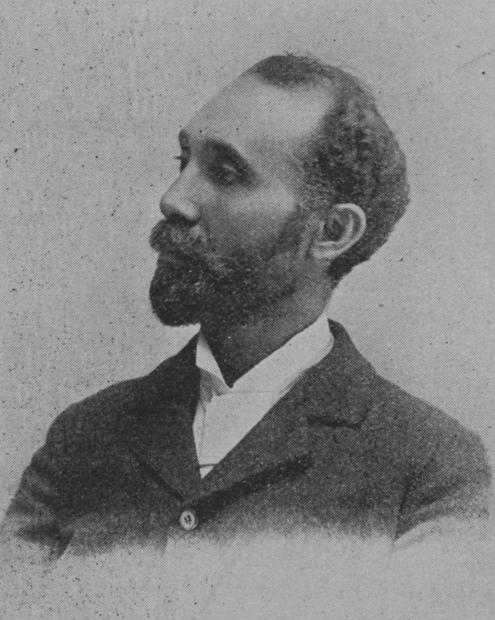
Attorney Ferdinand Lee Barnett (c. 1900). Wells married Barnett in 1895.

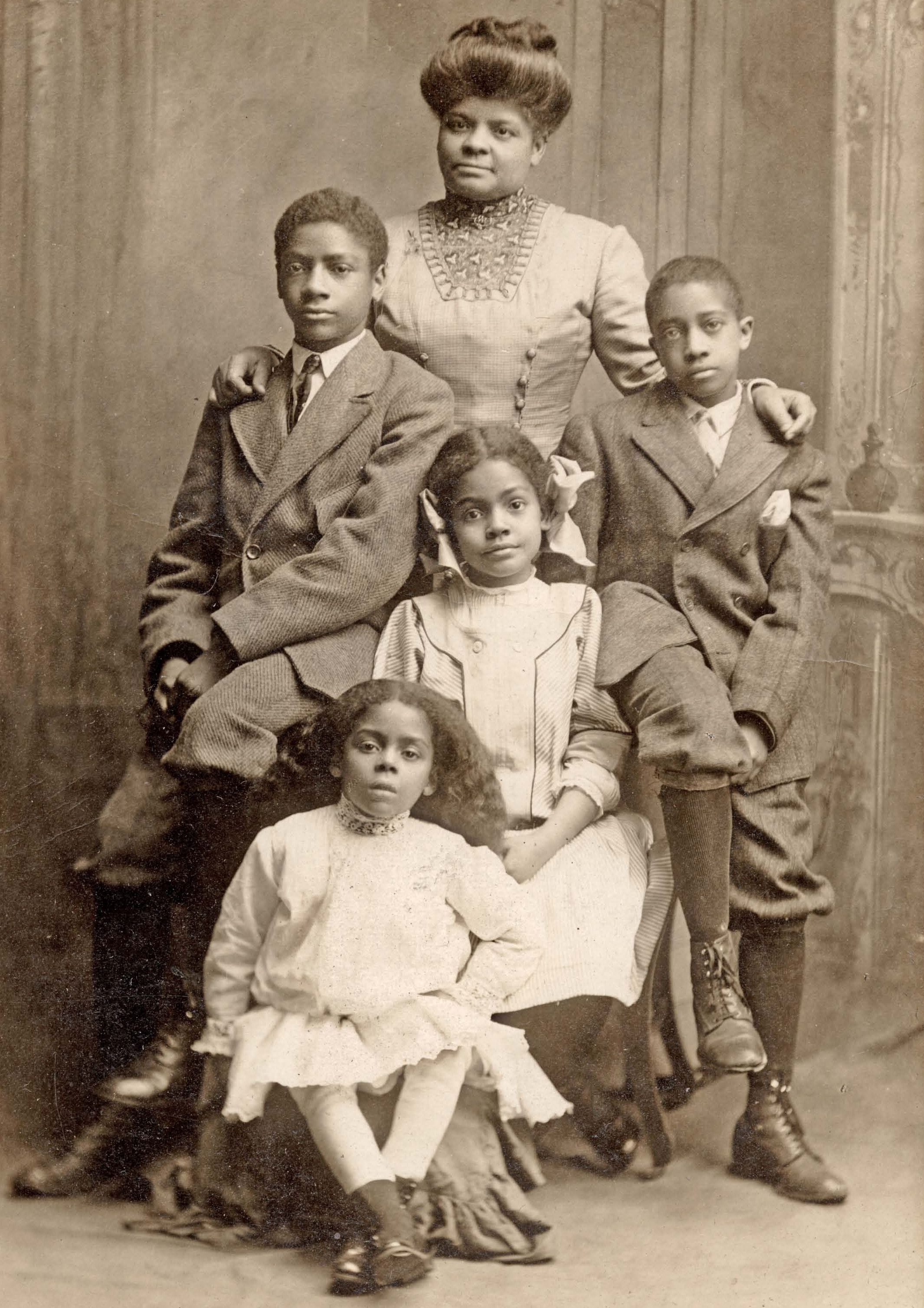
Wells with her four children, 1909

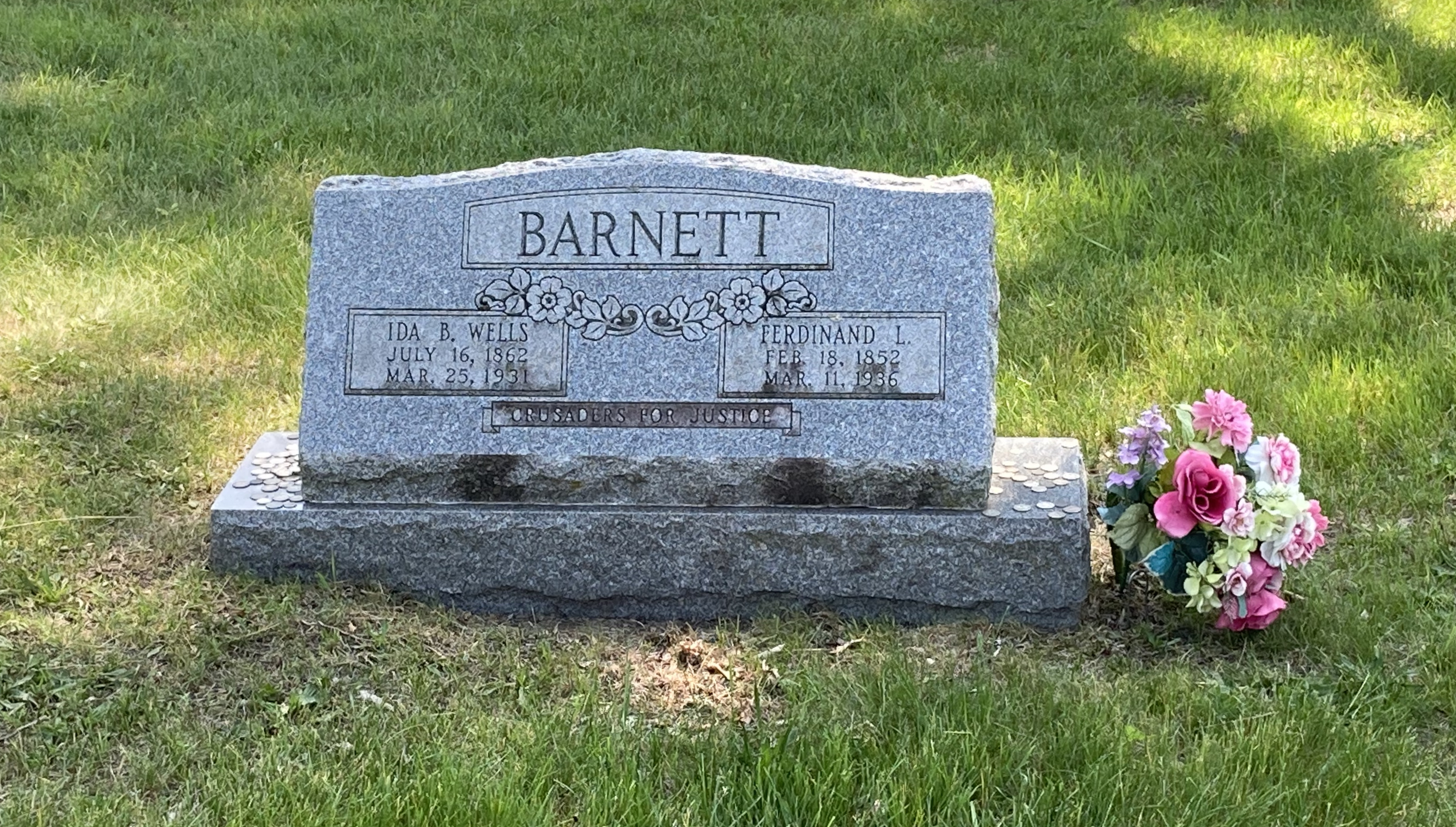
Grave marker for Ida B. Wells-Barnett and her husband Ferdinand L. Barnett at Oak Woods Cemetery

On June 27, 1895, in Chicago at Bethel African Methodist Episcopal Church, Wells married attorney Ferdinand Lee Barnett, a widower with two sons, Ferdinand Barnett and Albert Graham Barnett (1886–1962). Ferdinand Lee Barnett, who lived in Chicago, was a prominent attorney, civil rights activist, and journalist. Like Wells, he spoke widely against lynchings and in support of the civil rights of African Americans. Wells and Barnett had met in 1893, working together on a pamphlet protesting the lack of Black representation at the World's Columbian Exposition in Chicago in 1893. Barnett founded The Chicago Conservator, the first Black newspaper in Chicago, in 1878. Wells began writing for the paper in 1893, later acquired a partial ownership interest, and after marrying Barnett, assumed the role of editor.

Wells's marriage to Barnett was a legal union as well as a partnership of ideas and actions. Both were journalists, as well as established activists with a shared commitment to civil rights. In an interview, Wells's daughter Alfreda said that the two had "like interests" and that their journalist careers were "intertwined". This sort of close working relationship between a wife and husband was unusual at the time, as women often played more traditional domestic roles in a marriage.

In addition to Barnett's two children from his previous marriage, the couple had four more: Charles Aked Barnett (1896–1957), Herman Kohlsaat Barnett (1897–1975), Ida Bell Wells Barnett Jr. (1901–1988), and Alfreda Marguerita Barnett (married surname Duster; 1904–1983). Charles Aked Barnett's middle name was the surname of Charles Frederic Aked (1864–1941), an influential British-born-turned-American progressive Protestant clergyman who, in 1894, while pastor of the Pembrooke Baptist Church in Liverpool, England, befriended Wells, endorsed her anti-lynching campaign, and hosted her during her second speaking tour in England in 1894.

Wells began writing her autobiography, Crusade for Justice (1928), but never finished the book; edited by her daughter Alfreda Barnett Duster, it was posthumously published, in 1970, as Crusade for Justice: The Autobiography of Ida B. Wells.In a chapter of Crusade For Justice, titled "A Divided Duty", Wells described the challenge of splitting her time between family and work. She continued to work after the birth of her first child, traveling and bringing the infant Charles with her. Although she tried to balance her roles as a mother and as a national activist, it was alleged that she was not always successful. Susan B. Anthony said she seemed "distracted".

The establishment by Wells of Chicago's first kindergarten prioritizing Black children, located in the lecture room of the Bethel AME Church, demonstrates how her public activism and her personal life were connected; as her great-granddaughter Michelle Duster notes: "When her older children started getting of school age, then she recognized that black children did not have the same kind of educational opportunities as some other students .... And so, her attitude was, 'Well since it doesn't exist, we'll create it ourselves.'"

== African-American leadership ==
The 19th century's acknowledged leader for African-American civil rights, Frederick Douglass praised Wells's work, giving her introductions and sometimes financial support for her investigations. When he died in 1895, Wells was perhaps at the height of her notoriety, but many men and women were ambivalent or against a woman taking the lead in Black civil rights at a time when women were not seen as, and often not allowed to be, leaders by the wider society. The new leading voices, Booker T. Washington, his rival, W. E. B. Du Bois, and more traditionally minded women activists, often viewed Wells as too radical.

Wells encountered and sometimes collaborated with the others, but they also had many disagreements, while also competing for attention for their ideas and programs. For example, there are differing in accounts for why Wells's name was excluded from the original list of founders of the NAACP. In his autobiography Dusk of Dawn, Du Bois implied that Wells chose not to be included. However, in her autobiography, Wells stated that Du Bois deliberately excluded her from the list.

== Organizing in Chicago ==
Having settled in Chicago, Wells continued her anti-lynching work while becoming more focused on the civil rights of African Americans. She worked with national civil rights leaders to protest a major exhibition, she was active in the national women's club movement, and she ultimately ran for a position in the Illinois State Senate. She also was passionate about women's rights and suffrage. She was a spokeswoman and an advocate for women being successful in the workplace, having equal opportunities, and creating a name for themselves.

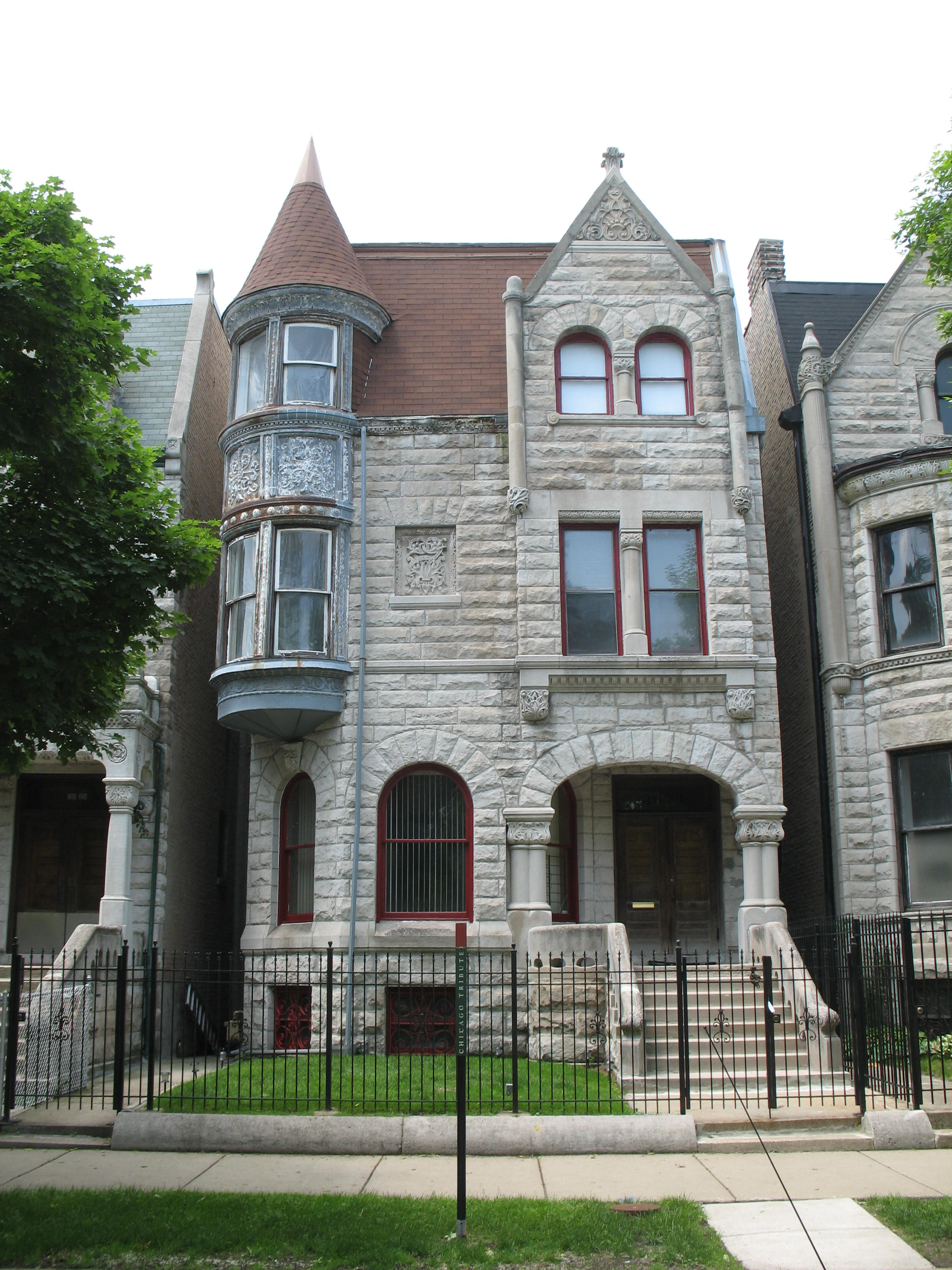
Ida B. Wells House is a Chicago landmark and National Historic Landmark.

Wells was an active member of the National Equal Rights League (NERL), founded in 1864, and was their representative calling on President Woodrow Wilson to end discrimination in government jobs. In 1914, she served as president of NERL's Chicago bureau.

In 1911, Wells attended the second annual Single Tax Conference. This meeting, which promoted the ideology of Land Value Tax (see also Single tax and Georgism), was moved from its original location, Chicago's La Salle Hotel, to protest against the hotel's discrimination against African Americans at the conference banquet.

Wells's earlier involvement with the Single Tax movement was noted in an October 28, 1891, issue of The Standard, which listed her alongside Rev. Thomas Nightingale (1844–1922), editor of the Memphis Free Speech; John Houston Burrus (1849–1917), President of Alcorn University; Hon. James Hill (about 1837–1903), Postmaster, Vicksburg, Mississippi; and W.L. Grady (né William Lawson Grady; 1861–1918) of Bellevue, Mississippi (an original settler and later, an incorporator of Mound Mayou), in outreach efforts supporting land reform among Black Americans.

=== World's Columbian Exposition ===
In 1893, the World's Columbian Exposition was held in Chicago. Together with Frederick Douglass and other Black leaders, Wells organized a Black boycott of the fair, for the fair's lack of representation of African-American achievement in the exhibits. Wells, Douglass, Irvine Garland Penn, and Wells's future husband, Ferdinand L. Barnett, wrote sections of the pamphlet The Reason Why: The Colored American Is Not in the World's Columbian Exposition, which detailed the progress of Blacks since their arrival in America and also exposed the basis of Southern lynchings. Wells later reported to Albion W. Tourgée that copies of the pamphlet had been distributed to more than 20,000 people at the fair. That year she started work with The Chicago Conservator, the oldest African-American newspaper in the city.

=== Women's clubs ===
Living in Chicago in the late 19th century, Wells was very active in the national Woman's club movement. In 1893, she organized The Women's Era Club, a first-of-its-kind civic club for African-American women in Chicago. Wells recruited veteran Chicago activist Mary Richardson Jones to serve as the first chair of the new club in 1894; Jones recruited for the organization and lent it considerable prestige. It would later be renamed the Ida B. Wells Club in her honor. In 1896, Wells took part in the meeting in Washington, D.C., that founded the National Association of Colored Women's Clubs. After her death, the club advocated to have a housing project in Chicago named after the founder, Ida B. Wells, and succeeded, making history in 1939 as the first housing project named after a woman of color. Wells also helped organize the National Afro-American Council, serving as the organization's first secretary.

Wells received much support from other social activists and her fellow club women. Frederick Douglass praised her work: "You have done your people and mine a service... What a revelation of existing conditions your writing has been for me."

Despite Douglass's praise, Wells was becoming a controversial figure among local and national women's clubs. This was evident when in 1899 the National Association of Colored Women's Clubs intended to meet in Chicago. Writing to the president of the association, Mary Terrell, Chicago organizers of the event stated that they would not cooperate in the meeting if it included Wells. When Wells learned that Terrell had agreed to exclude Wells, she called it "a staggering blow".

=== School segregation ===
In 1900, Wells was outraged when the Chicago Tribune published a series of articles suggesting adoption of a system of racial segregation in public schools. Given her experience as a schoolteacher in segregated systems in the South, she wrote to the publisher on the failures of segregated school systems and the successes of integrated public schools. She then went to his office and lobbied him. Unsatisfied, she enlisted the social reformer Jane Addams in her cause. Wells and the pressure group she put together with Addams are credited with stopping the adoption of an officially segregated school system.

== Suffrage ==
=== Willard controversy ===
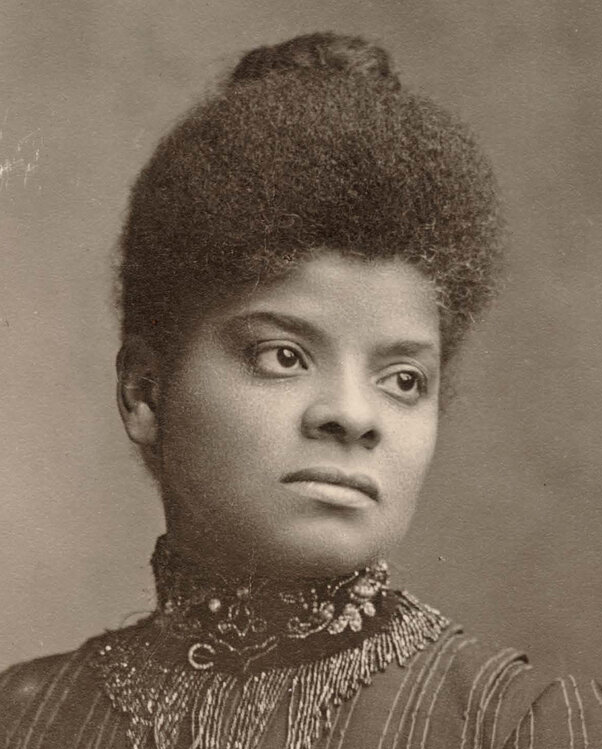
Ida B. Wells c. 1895

Wells' role in the U.S. suffrage movement was inextricably linked to her lifelong crusade against racism, violence and discrimination towards African Americans. Her view of women's enfranchisement was pragmatic and political. Like all suffragists, she believed in women's right to vote, but she also saw enfranchisement as a way for Black women to become politically involved in their communities and to use their votes to elect African Americans, regardless of gender, to influential political office.

As a prominent Black suffragist, Wells held strong positions against racism, violence and lynching that brought her into conflict with leaders of largely white suffrage organizations. Perhaps the most notable example of this conflict was her public disagreement with Frances Willard, the first President of the Woman's Christian Temperance Union (WCTU).

The WCTU was a predominantly white women's organization, with branches in every state and a growing membership, including in the Southern United States, where segregation laws and lynching occurred. With roots in the call for temperance and sobriety, the organization later became a powerful advocate of suffrage in the U.S.

In 1893 Wells and Willard travelled separately to Britain on lecture tours. Willard was promoting temperance as well as suffrage for women, and Wells was calling attention to lynching in the U.S. The basis of their dispute was Wells' public statements that Willard was silent on the issue of lynching. Wells referred to an interview Willard had conducted during her tour of the American South, in which Willard had blamed African Americans' behavior for the defeat of temperance legislation. "The colored race multiplies like the locusts of Egypt", Willard had said, and "the grog shop is its center of power. The safety of women, of childhood, of the home is menaced in a thousand localities, so that men dare not go beyond the sight of their own roof tree."

Although Willard and her prominent supporter Lady Somerset were critical of Wells' comments, Wells was able to turn that into her favor, portraying their criticisms as attempts by powerful white leaders to "crush an insignificant colored woman".

Wells also dedicated a chapter in The Red Record to juxtapose the different positions that she and Willard held. The chapter titled "Miss Willard's Attitude" condemned Willard for using rhetoric that promoted violence and other crimes against African Americans in America.

=== Negro Fellowship League ===
Wells, her husband, and some members of their Bible study group, in 1908 founded the Negro Fellowship League (NFL), the first Black settlement house in Chicago. The organization, in rented space, served as a reading room, library, activity center, and shelter for young Black men in the local community at a time when the local Young Men's Christian Association (YMCA) did not allow Black men to become members. The NFL also assisted with job leads and entrepreneurial opportunities for new arrivals in Chicago from Southern States, notably those of the Great Migration. During her involvement, the NFL advocated for women's suffrage and supported the Republican Party in Illinois.

=== Alpha Suffrage Club ===
In the years following her dispute with Willard, Wells continued her anti-lynching campaign and organizing in Chicago. She focused her work on Black women's suffrage in the city following the enactment of a new state law enabling partial women's suffrage. The Illinois Presidential and Municipal Suffrage Bill of 1913 (see Women's suffrage in Illinois) gave women in the state the right to vote for presidential electors, mayor, aldermen and most other local offices; but not for governor, state representatives or members of Congress. (Note: 48th Illinois General Assembly, Regular Biennial Session: 1. May 7, 1913: Senate Bill 63 – State Senator Hugh Stewart Magill, Jr. (1868–1958), from Princeton, sponsored a limited women's suffrage bill. The Illinois Senate (the Upper House) passed it May 7, 1913, by a vote of 29 to 15 – three more than the required majority.; 2. June 11, 1913: The House posed a stiffer challenge, right up to the day of the vote. The Illinois House of Representatives (the Lower House) passed it June 11, 1913, by a vote of 83 to 58.; 3. June 26, 1913: Governor Edward F. Dunne signed the bill June 26, 1913, in Springfield. The signing ceremony was filmed for the movies.) Illinois was the first state east of the Mississippi to grant women these voting rights.

The prospect of passing the act, even one of partial enfranchisement, was the impetus for Wells and her White colleague Belle Squire to organize the Alpha Suffrage Club in Chicago on January 30, 1913. The club was directly responsible for sending Wells to Washington to represent the race in the suffrage parade on March 3, personally covering her expenses for the trip. One of the most important Black suffrage organizations in Chicago, the Alpha Suffrage Club was founded as a way to further voting rights for all women, to teach Black women how to engage in civic matters, and to work to elect African Americans to city offices. Two years after its founding, the club played a significant role in electing Oscar De Priest as the first African American alderman in Chicago.

As Wells and Squire were organizing the Alpha Club, the National American Woman Suffrage Association (NAWSA) was organizing a suffrage parade in Washington D.C. Marching the day before the inauguration of Woodrow Wilson as president in 1913, suffragists from across the country gathered to demand universal suffrage. Wells, together with a delegation of members from Chicago, attended. On the day of the march, the head of the Illinois delegation told the Wells delegates that the NAWSA wanted "to keep the delegation entirely white", and all African-American suffragists, including Wells, were to walk at the end of the parade in a "colored delegation".

Instead of going to the back with other African Americans, however, Wells waited with spectators as the parade was underway, and stepped into the white Illinois delegation as they passed by. She visibly linked arms with her white suffragist colleagues, Squire and Virginia Brooks, for the rest of the parade, demonstrating, according to The Chicago Defender, the universality of the women's civil rights movement. The Black Chicago press celebrated Squire and Brooks as "the two white women who stood so loyally by Mrs. Barnett in her fight for colored representation."

== From "race agitator" to political candidate ==
During World War I, the U.S. government placed Wells under surveillance, labeling her a dangerous "race agitator". She defied this threat by continuing civil rights work during this period with such figures as Marcus Garvey, Monroe Trotter, and Madam C. J. Walker. In 1917, Wells wrote a series of investigative reports for the Chicago Defender on the East St. Louis Race Riots. After almost thirty years away, Wells made her first trip back to the South in 1921 to investigate and publish a report on the Elaine massacre in Arkansas (published 1922).

In the 1920s, she participated in the struggle for African-American workers' rights, urging Black women's organizations to support the Brotherhood of Sleeping Car Porters, as it tried to gain legitimacy. However, she lost the presidency of the National Association of Colored Women in 1924 to the more diplomatic Mary Bethune. To challenge what she viewed as problems for African Americans in Chicago, Wells started a political organization named Third Ward Women's Political Club in 1927. In 1928, she tried to become a delegate to the Republican National Convention but lost to Oscar De Priest. Her feelings toward the Republican Party became more mixed due to what she viewed as the Hoover administration's poor stance on civil rights and attempts to promote a "Lily-White" policy in Southern Republican organizations. In 1930, Wells unsuccessfully sought elective office, running as an independent for a seat in the Illinois Senate, against the Republican Party candidate, Adelbert Roberts.

== Influence on Black feminist activism ==
Ida B. Wells is widely regarded as an influential figure in Black feminist thought and activism. Her work helped establish the foundation of intersectional feminism, which explores how racism and sexism intersect in the lives of Black women. As a journalist, educator, and anti-lynching activist, Wells addressed the challenges Black women faced at the convergence of racism and sexism. Her persistence on Black women's autonomy and leadership influenced later generations of activists and scholars.

Wells' activism often placed her at an imbalance with both white-dominated suffrage organizations and Black male leadership, as she criticized the exclusion of Black women's voices from both movements. Her refusal to march at the back of the 1913 Woman Suffrage Procession in Washington, D.C., is frequently cited as a critical moment that demonstrated her resistance to racial segregation within feminist movements.

Scholars such as Beverly Guy-Sheftall and Patricia Hill Collins have emphasized Wells' role in shaping a distinct Black feminist tradition. Her focus on collective action, documentation of racial violence, and advocacy for both racial justice and gender equality prefigured key principles of modern Black feminist theory. Associations like the National Association of Colored Women (NACW), which Wells co-founded, provided a platform for Black women's voices in national reform movements.

Current Black feminist activists continue to draw inspiration from Wells' legacy. Her life and writings are often cited in discussions surrounding systematic racism, police violence, and reproductive justice. In recent years, campaigns such as the #SayHerName movement have reflected Wells' emphasis on naming and confronting racial violence against Black women.

== Legacy and honors ==
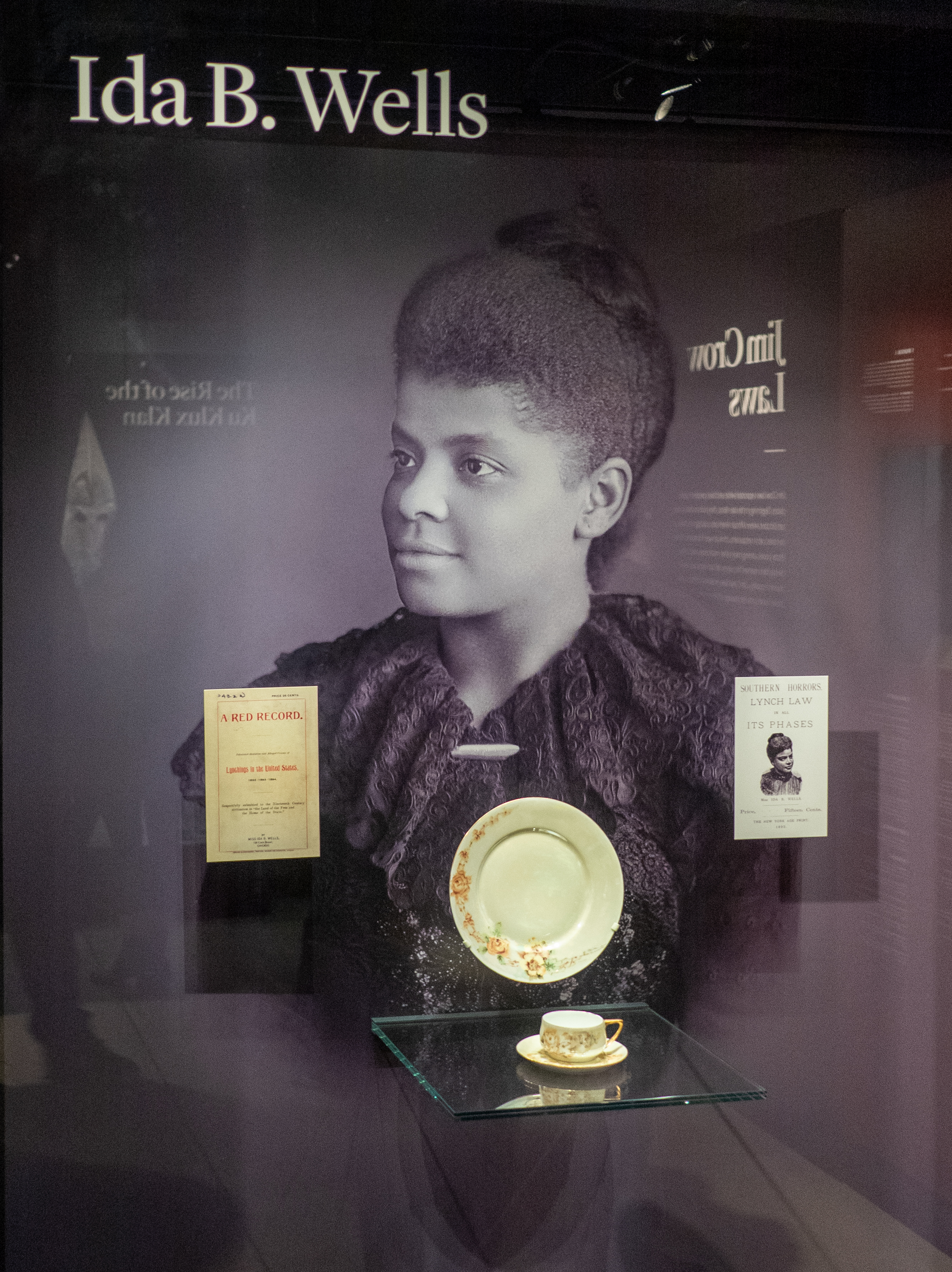
Ida B. Wells display at the National Museum of African American History and Culture

Wells died of kidney disease on March 25, 1931, in Chicago. Since Wells's death, with the rise of mid-20th-century civil rights activism, and the 1971 posthumous publication of her autobiography, interest in her life and legacy has grown. Awards have been established in her name by the National Association of Black Journalists, the Medill School of Journalism at Northwestern University, the Coordinating Council for Women in History, the Type Investigations (formerly the Investigative Fund), the University of Louisville, and the New York County Lawyers' Association (awarded annually since 2003), among many others. The Ida B. Wells Memorial Foundation and the Ida B. Wells Museum have also been established to protect, preserve and promote Wells's legacy. In her hometown of Holly Springs, Mississippi, there is an Ida B. Wells-Barnett Museum named in her honor that acts as a cultural center of African-American history.

In 1941, the Public Works Administration (PWA) built a Chicago Housing Authority public housing project in the Bronzeville neighborhood on the South Side of Chicago; it was named the Ida B. Wells Homes in her honor. The buildings were demolished in August 2011 due to changing demographics and ideas about such housing.

In 1988, she was inducted into the National Women's Hall of Fame. In August that year, she was also inducted into the Chicago Women's Hall of Fame. Molefi Kete Asante included Wells on his list of 100 Greatest African Americans in 2002. In 2011, Wells was inducted into the Chicago Literary Hall of Fame for her writings.

On February 1, 1990, at the start of Black History Month in the U.S., the U.S. Postal Service dedicated a 25¢ stamp commemorating Wells in a ceremony at the Museum of Science and Industry in Chicago. The stamp, designed by Thomas Blackshear II, features a portrait of Wells illustrated from a composite of photographs of her taken during the mid-1890s. Wells is the 25th African-American entry – and fourth African-American woman – on a U.S. postage stamp. She is the 13th in the Postal Service's Black Heritage series.

In 2006, the Harvard Kennedy School commissioned a portrait of Wells. In 2007, the Ida B. Wells Association was founded by University of Memphis philosophy graduate students to promote discussion of philosophical issues arising from the African-American experience and to provide a context in which to mentor undergraduates. The Philosophy Department at the University of Memphis has sponsored the Ida B. Wells conference every year since 2007.

On February 12, 2012, Mary E. Flowers, a member of the Illinois House of Representatives, introduced House Resolution 770 during the 97th General Assembly, honoring Ida B. Wells by declaring March 25, 2012 – the eighty-ninth anniversary of her death – as Ida B. Wells Day in the State of Illinois.

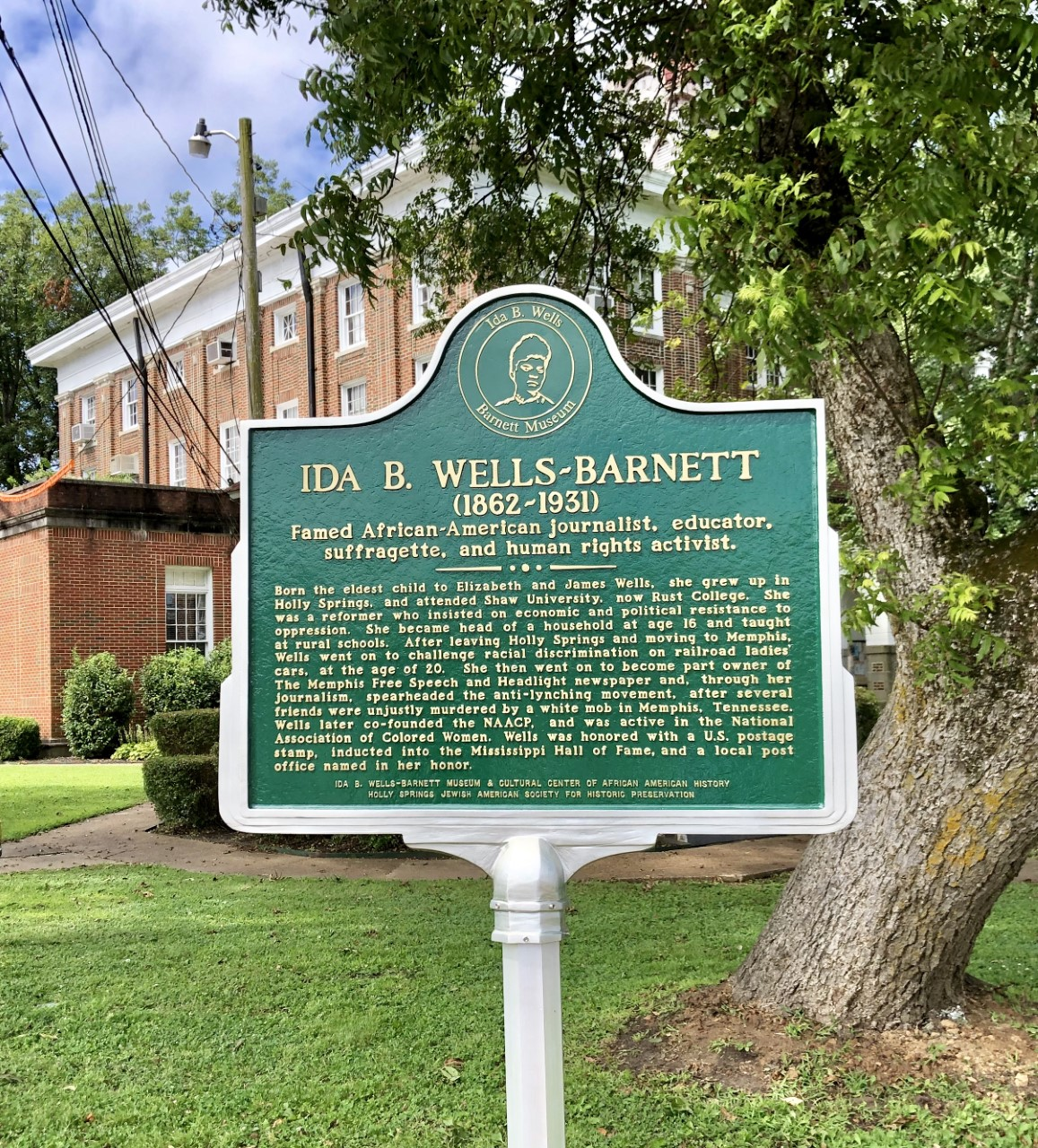
Historical marker honoring Ida B. Wells in Holly Springs, Mississippi

In August 2014, Wells was the subject of an episode of the BBC Radio 4 programme Great Lives, in which her work was championed by Baroness Oona King. Wells was honored with a Google Doodle on July 16, 2015, which would have been her 153rd birthday.

In 2016, the Ida B. Wells Society for Investigative Reporting was launched in Memphis, Tennessee, with the purpose of promoting investigative journalism. Following in the footsteps of Wells, this society encourages minority journalists to expose injustices perpetuated by the government and defend people who are susceptible to being taken advantage of. This organization was created with much support from the Open Society Foundations, Ford Foundation, and CUNY Graduate School of Journalism.

In 2018, the National Memorial for Peace and Justice opened, including a reflection space dedicated to Wells, a selection of quotes by her, and a stone inscribed with her name.

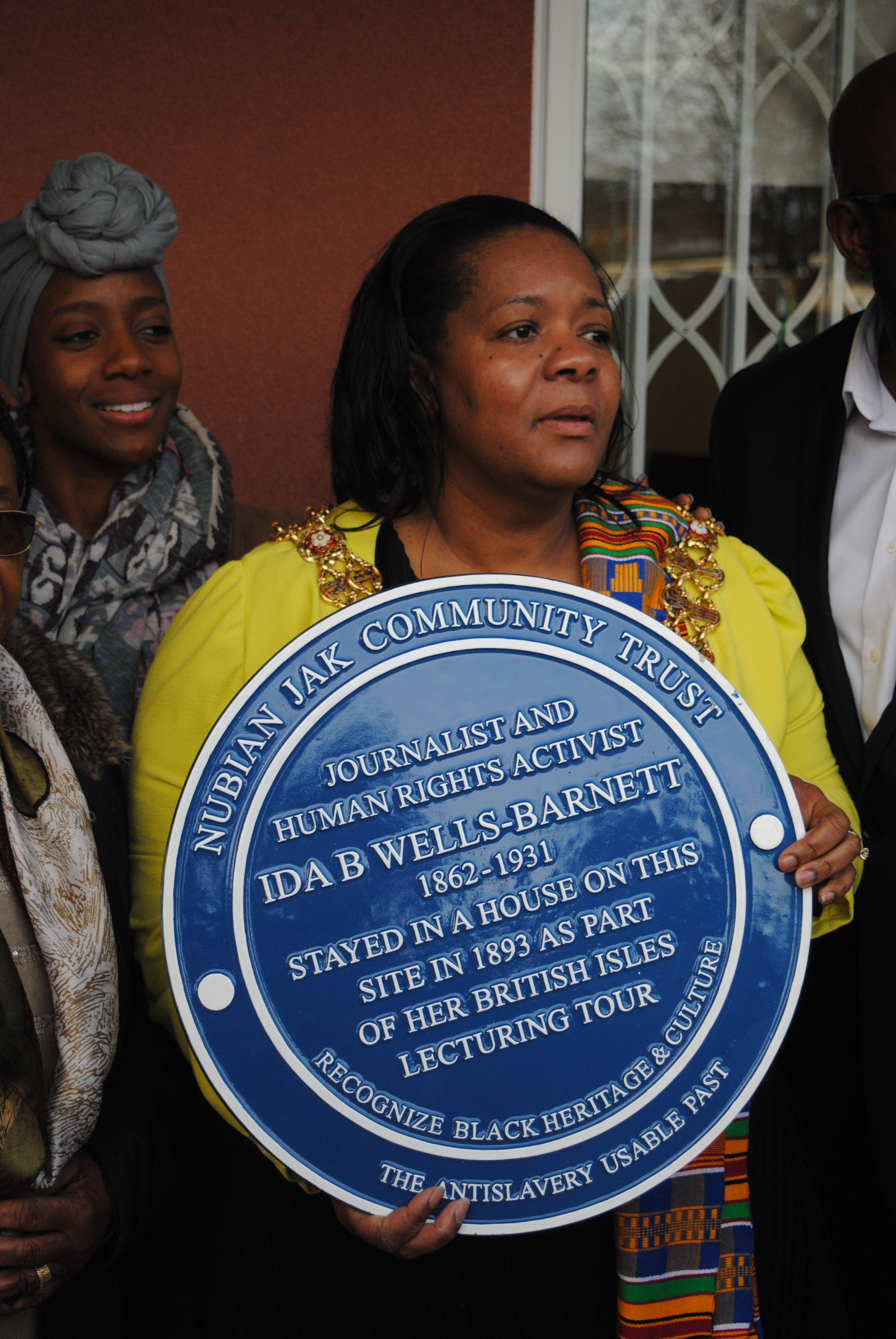
Yvonne Mosquito, Lord Mayor of Birmingham, England, commemorating Wells's 1893 British Isles lecture tour with a blue plaque

On March 8, 2018, The New York Times published a belated obituary for her, in a series marking International Women's Day and entitled "Overlooked", which set out to acknowledge that, since 1851, the newspaper's obituary pages had been dominated by white men, while notable women – including Wells – had been ignored.

In July 2018, Chicago's City Council officially renamed Congress Parkway as Ida B. Wells Drive; it is the first downtown Chicago street named after a woman of color.

On February 12, 2019, a blue plaque, provided by the Nubian Jak Community Trust, was unveiled by the Lord Mayor of Birmingham, Yvonne Mosquito, at the Edgbaston Community Centre, Birmingham, England, commemorating Wells's stay in a house on the exact site of 66 Gough Road where she stayed in 1893 during her speaking tour of the British Isles.

On July 13, 2019, a marker for her was unveiled in Mississippi, on the northeast corner of Holly Springs' Courthouse Square. The marker was dedicated by the Wells–Barnett Museum and the Jewish American Society for Historic Preservation.

In 2019, a new middle school in Washington, D.C., was named in her honor. On November 7, 2019, a Mississippi Writers Trail historical marker was installed at Rust College in Holly Springs, commemorating the legacy of Ida B. Wells.

On May 4, 2020, she was posthumously awarded a Pulitzer Prize special citation, "for her outstanding and courageous reporting on the horrific and vicious violence against African Americans during the era of lynching". The Pulitzer Prize board announced that it would donate at least $50,000 in support of Wells's mission to recipients who would be announced at a later date.

In 2021, a public high school in Portland, Oregon, that had been named for Woodrow Wilson was renamed Ida B. Wells High School.

In 2025, Wells was honored on a U.S. quarter part of the final year of the American Women quarters program. The quarter's launch was celebrated at Chicago's DuSable Black History Museum and Education Center in partnership with the United States Mint and the National Women's History Museum on February 12, 2025.

The Fourth Annual Ida B. Wells Festival will take place in Bronzeville, the Black Metropolis National Heritage Area in Chicago on June 28, 2025.

=== Monuments ===
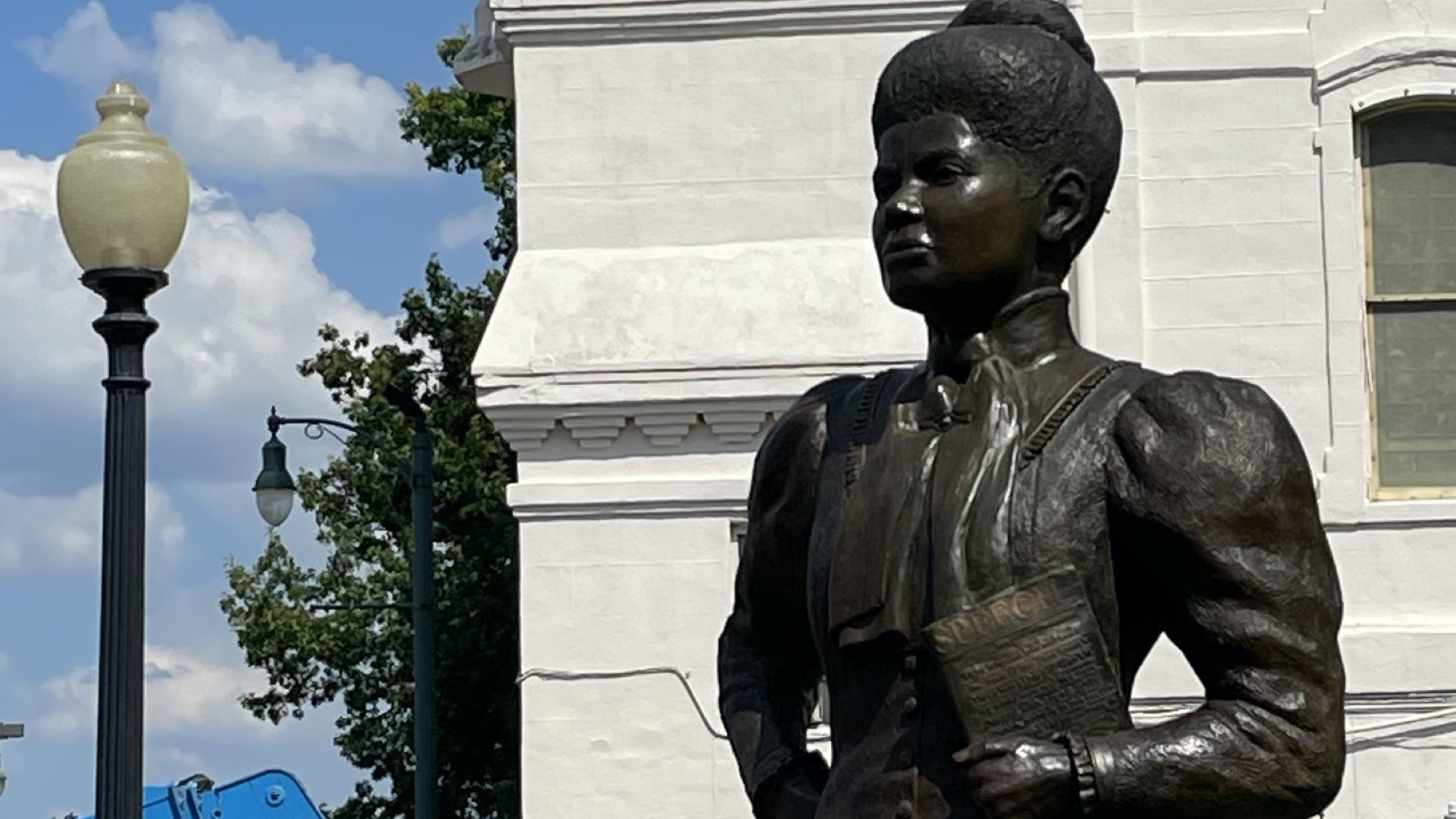
The life-sized statue of Ida B. Wells in downtown Memphis

In 2021, Chicago erected a monument to Wells in the Bronzeville neighborhood, near where she lived and close to the site of the former Ida B. Wells Homes housing project. Officially called The Light of Truth Ida B. Wells National Monument (based on her quote, "the way to right wrongs is to cast the light of truth upon them"), it was created by sculptor Richard Hunt.

Also in 2021, Memphis dedicated a new Ida B. Wells plaza with a life-sized statue of Wells. The monument is adjacent to the historic Beale Street Baptist Church, where Wells produced the Free Speech newspaper.

=== Representation in media ===
On April 10, 1949, the anthology radio drama Destination Freedom recapped parts of her life in the episode "Woman with a Mission", written by Richard Durham.

The PBS documentary series American Experience aired on December 19, 1989 – season 2, episode 11 (one-hour) – "Ida B. Wells: A Passion for Justice", written and directed by William Greaves. The documentary featured excerpts of Wells's memoirs read by Toni Morrison. (viewable via YouTube)

In 1995, the play In Pursuit of Justice: A One-Woman Play About Ida B. Wells, written by Wendy D. Jones (born 1953) and starring Janice Jenkins, was produced. It draws on historical incidents and speeches from Wells's autobiography, and features fictional letters to a friend. It won four awards from the AUDELCO (Audience Development Committee Inc.), an organization that honors Black theater.

In 1999, a staged reading of the play Iola's Letter, written by Michon Boston (née Michon Alana Boston; born 1962), was performed at Howard University in Washington, D.C., under the direction of Vera J. Katz, (Note: Vera J. Katz (née Vera Joy Weintraub; born 1936) is Professor Emerita from Howard University, Department of Theater Arts, where she taught acting and directing for 32 years – from 1969 to about 2001. [Like many of the writers cited in this article], Katz has devoted much of her career to fighting bigotry. (Hentoff March 28, 1994)) including then-student Chadwick Boseman among the cast. The play is inspired by the real-life events that compelled a 29-year-old Ida B. Wells to launch an anti-lynching crusade from Memphis in 1892 using her newspaper, Free Speech.

Wells's life is the subject of Constant Star (2002), a widely performed musical drama by Tazewell Thompson, who was inspired to write it by the 1989 documentary Ida B. Wells: A Passion for Justice. Thompson's play explores Wells as "a seminal figure in Post-Reconstruction America".

Wells was played by Adilah Barnes in the 2004 film Iron Jawed Angels. The film dramatizes a moment during the Woman Suffrage Parade of 1913 when Wells ignored instructions to march with the segregated parade units and crossed the lines to march with the other members of her Illinois chapter.

Wells is a major character in the musical Suffs; the piece had its premier at The Public Theater in 2022, before transferring to Broadway in 2024. In both productions, she was played by Nikki M. James, who earned a Tony nomination for her performance.

== Selected publications ==
- The Arkansas Race Riot (Manuscript). 1920 – via Northern Illinois University Digital Library.
- Mob Rule in New Orleans: Robert Charles and His Fight to Death, the Story of His Life, Burning Human Beings Alive, Other Lynching Statistics. 1900.
- The Red Record: Tabulated Statistics and Alleged Causes of Lynching in the United States. 1895.
- Southern Horrors: Lynch Law in All Its Phases. New York: New York Age Print. 1892 – via Schomburg Center for Research in Black Culture, Manuscripts, Archives and Rare Books Division, New York Public Library.
- Crusade for Justice: The Autobiography of Ida B. Wells. 1970 — via The University of Pennsylvania School of Arts and Sciences.

== See also ==
- Black feminism
- Frederick Douglass
- List of civil rights leaders
- List of American print journalists
- List of investigative journalists
- List of suffragists and suffragettes
- List of women's rights activists
- Timeline of women's suffrage
- Harriet Tubman
- Booker T. Washington

== Bibliography ==
=== Secondary references to linked inline notes ===
Books, journals, magazines, academic papers, online blogs
- Allen, James E. (2011) [1994]. Without Sanctuary: Photographs and Postcards of Lynching in America. Santa Fe: Twin Palms Publisher.
Print:
1. Book (1st ed.) (July 31, 1999); OCLC 936079991
2. Book (10th ed.) (February 1, 2000): OCLC 994750311, 751138477; ISBN 978-0-944092-69-9
3. Book (11th ed.) (2011): OCLC 1075938297

Exhibitions, film, digital:

4. Roth Horowitz Gallery, 160A East 70th Street, Manhattan (January 14, 2000 – February 12, 2000); Andrew Roth and Glenn Horowitz, gallery co-owners, Witness: Photographs of Lynchings from the Collection of James Allen and John Littlefield, organized by Andrew Roth
5. New York Historical Society (March 14, 2000 – October 1, 2000); OCLC 809988821, Without Sanctuary: Lynching Photography in America, curated by James Allen and Julia Hotton
6. Andy Warhol Museum (September 22, 2001 – February 21, 2002), The Without Sanctuary Project, curated by James Allen; co-directed by Jessica Arcand and Margery King
7. Martin Luther King Jr. National Historical Park (May 1, 2002 – December 31, 2002), Without Sanctuary: Lynching Photography in America; OCLC 782970109, curated by Joseph F. Jordan, PhD (né Joseph Ferdinand Jordan Jr.; born 1951); Douglas H. Quin, PhD (born 1956) exhibition designer; National Park Service MLK site team: Frank Catroppa, Saudia Muwwakkil, and Melissa English-Rias
8. The 2002 short film, Without Sanctuary, directed by Matt Dibble (né Matthew Phillips Dibble; born 1959) and produced by Joseph F. Jordan, PhD (né Joseph Ferdinand Jordan Jr.; born 1951), accompanied the 2002–2003 exhibition by the same name, Without Sanctuary, at the Martin Luther King Jr. National Historical Park (co-sponsored by Emory University)
9. Digital format (2008): OCLC 1179211921, 439904269 (Overview, Movie, Photos, Forum)
10. Official website; part of collection at the Robert W. Woodruff Library at Emory University
- Alpha Suffrage Record, The (March 18, 1914). "The Alpha Suffrage Club" (PDF) (inaugural newsletter). Vol. 1, no. 1. Chicago: Alpha Suffrage Club. Archived (PDF) from the original on November 23, 2021 – via Living History of Illinois and Chicago, Neil Gale, Curator.
- Asante, Molefi Kete (2002). "Ida B. Wells-Barnett". 100 Greatest African Americans: A Biographical Encyclopedia. Amherst, New York: Prometheus Books. pp. 110, 309–311. ISBN 1-57392-963-8. LCCN 2002018993. OCLC 1018143510.
- Baker, Lee D. (February 2012). "Ida B. Wells-Barnett: Fighting and Writing for Justice" (PDF). eJournal USA. 16 (6). U.S. Department of State: 6–8. ISSN 1949-7644. OCLC 700047682. Archived from the original (PDF) on May 17, 2021.
- Bay, Mia (2009). To Tell the Truth Freely: The Life of Ida B. Wells. Hill & Wang. ISBN 978-0-8090-1646-4. OCLC 1032224630.
- Berenson, Tessa C. (July 16, 2015). "Today's Google Doodle Celebrates Journalist Ida B. Wells' Birthday". Time.com (online). ISSN 0040-781X. Archived from the original on December 27, 2018.
- "Ida B. Wells". Biography. January 16, 2020 [April 27, 2017].
- Black, Patti Carr (February 2001). "Ida B. Wells: A Courageous Voice for Civil Rights". Mississippi History Now (online publication). Mississippi Historical Society. Archived from the original on February 21, 2019.
- Boissoneault, Lorraine (January 21, 2017). "The Original Women's March on Washington and the Suffragists Who Paved the Way". Smithsonian (online). ISSN 0037-7333. Archived from the original on November 3, 2017.
- Brody, Richard (July 27, 2020). "What to Stream – Ida B. Wells: A Passion for Justice". Goings on About Town: Movies. The New Yorker. Vol. 96, no. 21. p. 8. OCLC 877711126 (all editions). ISSN 0028-792X.
- Broschart, Kay Richards (1991). "Beatrice Webb (1858–1943)". In Mary Jo Deegan's [in Spanish] (ed.). Women in Sociology: A Bio-Bibliographical Sourcebook. New York: Greenwood Press. pp. 425–431. LCCN 90-43376; ISBN 0-3132-6085-0, 978-0-3132-6085-8; OCLC 22181691 (all editions).
1. Via Internet Archive (Linwood College, withdrawn). (limited preview). 1991. ISBN 978-0-313-26085-8.
- Busby, Margaret, ed. (1992). "Ida B. Wells (Barnett)". Daughters of Africa. Jonathan Cape / Ballantine Books. p. 150. ISBN 0-345-38268-4. LCCN 93-90470. OCLC 925350164 – via Internet Archive.
- Candeloro, Dominic [in Italian] (April 1979). "The Single Tax Movement and Progressivism, 1880–1920" (PDF). The American Journal of Economics and Sociology. 38 (2): 113–127. doi:10.1111/j.1536-7150.1979.tb02869.x. Archived from the original (PDF) on July 22, 2015. LCCN 45-42294 (publication); ISSN 0002-9246 (publication, print), ISSN 1536-7150 (publication, online); OCLC 01480136 (publication); JSTOR 3486892 (article).
1. Page 125 (PDF). Archived (PDF) from the original on July 22, 2015 – via The School of Cooperative Individualism, Cherry Hill, New Jersey.
"... several black single taxers, including Frank Warren of Mackinac, Michigan and Ida Wells-Barnett of Chicago participated in various meetings. In fact, the 1911 Single Tax Conference was moved from Chicago's LaSalle Hotel in protest against that establishment's refusal to provide equal service to Negroes at the conference banquet."
- Cardon, Dustin (February 27, 2018). "Ida B. Wells". Jackson Free Press (blog). Jackson, Mississippi. Archived from the original on March 5, 2018. Note: the article is not in the print edition (back issues at ISSUU).
- Cairnes, John Elliott (August 1865). "The Negro Suffrage". Macmillan's Magazine. 12 (68): 334–343.
- CCWH (November 9, 2012). "Ida B. Wells Graduate Student Fellowship". Columbia, Maryland: Coordinating Council for Women in History. (awarded annually since 1999)
- "Chesapeake, Ohio & Southwestern Railroad Company v. Ida B. Wells. (Supreme Court of Tennessee; April Term, 1887)". Southwestern Reporter. (Vol. 4. May 16, 1887 – August 1, 1887). St. Paul: West Publishing Company: 5. 1886 – via Internet Archive. " ... her persistence was not in good faith ... "
- Chicago Literary Hall of Fame (November 15, 2011). "Ida B. Wells". chicagoliteraryhof.org. Archived from the original on October 18, 2017. (inducted during the Second Annual Ceremony at the Harold Washington Library November 15, 2011; the article includes a video.)
- Collins, Patricia Hill (2000). Black Feminist Thought: Knowledge, Consciousness, and the Politics of Empowerment (2nd ed.). Routledge (the 10th Anniversary edition of the 2nd edition is published by Psychology Press) – via Google Books (limited preview). LCCN 99-29144 (2nd ed.); ISBN 978-0-4159-2483-2, 0-4159-2483-9 (hardback), ISBN 0-4159-2484-7 (paperback).
1. Pages – via Internet Archive: 24. 2000, 33. 2000, 34. 2000, 86–87. 2000, 125 (limited preview; borrow unavailable). 2000.
2. Pages – via Google Books: 24, 33, 34, 86, 87, 125 (limited preview).
- Crenshaw, Kimberlé; Ritchie, Andrea; Anspach, Rachel; Gilmer, Rachel; Harris, Luke (July 7, 2015). "Say Her Name: Resisting Police Brutality Against Black Women". African American Policy Forum (report). New York: Center for Intersectionality and Social Policy Studies, Columbia Law School. Archived from the original on May 4, 2022. OCLC 933385430, 1357725415, 1309062524, and 1313524107.
- Cruickshank, Matt (July 16, 2015). "Ida B. Wells' 153rd Birthday". Google Doodle. Google Doodles Archive Archived April 24, 2014, at the Wayback Machine.
- Curry, Tommy J. (Fall 2012). "The Fortune of Wells: Ida B. Wells-Barnett's Use of T. Thomas Fortune's Philosophy of Social Agitation as a Prolegomenon to Militant Civil Rights Activism". Transactions of the Charles S. Peirce Society. 48 (4). Charles Sanders Peirce Society: 456–482. doi:10.2979/trancharpeirsoc.48.4.456. LCCN 0009-1774. OCLC 844279727. S2CID 145734549.
- DeCosta-Willis, Miriam (March 1, 2018) [October 8, 2017]. "Ida B. Wells-Barnett". Tennessee Encyclopedia (online). Tennessee Historical Society.
- Doenecke, Justus Drew (2002). "Wells-Barnett, Ida (1862–1931)". In Commire, Anne; Klezmer, Deborah; Morgan, Barbara (eds.). Women in World History: A Biographical Encyclopedia. Vol. 16: Vict–X. Yorkin Publications. pp. 352–360. ISBN 0-7876-4075-1. LCCN 99-24692. OCLC 593847777 – via Internet Archive. (Also accessible online: "Wells-Barnett, Ida" via encyclopedia.com. Retrieved November 7, 2020.)
- Douglass, Frederick (2002). "Letter from Frederick Douglass to Ida B. Wells; October 25, 1892". In Gabbidon, Shaun L.; Greene, Helen Taylor; Young, Vernetta Diane (eds.). African American Classics in Criminology and Criminal Justice. Sage Publications. p. 25. ISBN 978-0-7619-2433-3. OCLC 5559711186.
- Du Bois, William Edward Burghardt (1970) [1940]. Dusk of Dawn; An Essay Toward an Autobiography of a Race Concept. New York: Schocken Books (1970); Harcourt, Brace & Company (1940). ISBN 978-3-8472-0182-3. LCCN 65-14825. OCLC 552187560 – via Internet Archive.
- DuRocher, Kristina (2016). Ida B. Wells: Social Activist and Reformer. Taylor and Francis. Retrieved July 20, 2025.

LCCN 2016-5150.
doi:10.4324/9781315767024.
ISBN 1-1387-8687-X, 978-1-1387-8687-5 (hardcover).
ISBN 1-3176-6219-9, 978-1-3176-6219-8 (ebook).
ISBN 1-3176-6220-2, 978-1-3176-6220-4 (ebook).
ISBN 1-3157-6702-3, 978-1-3157-6702-4 (ebook).
ISBN 1-1387-8688-8, 978-1-1387-8688-2 (paperback).
OCLC 957700358 (all editions).

1. Via Google Books (limited preview).
2. Via Google Books (limited preview).
- Duster, Alfreda; Terkel, Studs (September 3, 1971). Alfreda Wells discusses her mother, Ida B. Wells-Barnett and her book 'Crusade for Justice' (verbal transcript and sound recording) (radio transcript). Chicago: Studs Terkel Radio Archive at WFMT.
- Duster, Michelle (2010). Ida From Abroad: The Timeless Writings of Ida B. Wells From England in 1894 (self-published). Chicago: Benjamin Williams Publishing, LLC (currently South Holland, Illinois: BW Publishing). ISBN 978-0-9802398-9-8. OCLC 608235660.
- Elliott, Mark Emory (2006). Color-Blind Justice: Albion Tourgée and the Quest for Racial Equality from the Civil War to Plessey v. Ferguson. New York: Oxford University Press. ISBN 978-0-19-537021-8. LCCN 2006011311. Related articles: Albion Mourgée and Plessey v. Ferguson. OCLC all editions.
- Enright, Mairead (March 8, 2018). "Gender and Legal History in Birmingham and the West Midlands – Ida B. Wells and the Birmingham Connection" (Enright's blog at the University of Birmingham). Archived from the original on February 15, 2019.
- Flexner, Eleanor; Fitzpatrick, Ellen Frances (2000) [1959, 1975, 1996]. Century of Struggle: The Woman's Rights Movement in the United States (enlarged ed.). Cambridge, Massachusetts & London: Belknap Press of Harvard University Press. ISBN 978-0-674-10653-6. LCCN 96-5651. OCLC 634643994 – via Internet Archive.
- Fradin, Dennis B.; Fradin, Judith Bloom (2000). Ida B. Wells: Mother of the Civil Rights Movement. Houghton Mifflin Harcourt. p. 21. ISBN 0-395-89898-6. OCLC 64586878.
- Franklin, Vincent P. (1995). Living Our Stories, Telling Our Truths: Autobiography and the Making of African American Intellectual Tradition. Oxford University Press. pp. 61–65. ISBN 978-0-689-12192-0. OCLC 31606548.
- Giddings, Paula J. (1984). "1: 'To Sell My Life as Dearly as Possible': Ida B. Wells and the Antilynching Campaign". When and Where I Enter: The Impact of Black Women on Race and Sex in America.
- Giddings, Paula J. (2008). Ida: A Sword Among Lions: Ida B. Wells and the Campaign Against Lynching. Amistad Press. ISBN 978-0-06-197294-2. OCLC 865473600.
- Giddings, Paula J. (2013). "Wells-Barnett, Ida B. 1862–1931". In Mason, Patrick Leon (ed.). Encyclopedia of Race and Racism. Vol. 4: S–Z (2nd ed.). MacMillan Reference USA, an imprint of Gale. pp. 265–267. ISBN 978-0-02-866024-0.
- Giddings, Paula J. (2008). "Wells-Barnett, Ida B. 1862–1931". In Moore, John Hartwell (ed.). Encyclopedia of Race and Racism. Vol. 3: S–Z (1st ed.). MacMillan Reference USA, an imprint of Gale. pp. 207–219. ISBN 978-0-02-866023-3. LCCN 2007024359 – via Internet Archive.
- Goings, Kenneth W. (October 7, 2019) [October 8, 2017]. "Memphis Free Speech". Tennessee Encyclopedia. Tennessee Historical Society. Archived from the original on May 18, 2018.
- Guy-Sheftall, Beverly (1995). Guy-Sheftall, Beverly (ed.). Words of Fire: An Anthology of African-American Feminist Thought. New Press. LCCN 95-69570; ISBN 1-5658-4256-1; OCLC 33270584, 811491447.
1. Guy-Sheftall, Beverly (1995). Introduction: "The Evolution of Feminist Consciousness Among African American Women". pp. 1–22. ISBN 978-1-56584-256-4 – via Internet Archive (not borrowable; limited preview).
2. Wells, Ida B. (1995). Lynch Law In America". pp. 100–104. ISBN 978-1-56584-256-4 – via Internet Archive (not borrowable; limited preview).
- Gyimah, Miriam C. (2008). "Wells-Barnett, Ida B". In Boyce Davies, Carole (ed.). Encyclopedia of the African Diaspora: Origins, Experiences, and Culture. ABC-Clio. pp. 976–978. ISBN 978-1-85109-700-5. LCCN 2008011880.
- "Honoring Ida B. Wells With Chicago's First Monument to an African American Woman". BPI – Business and Professional People for the Public Interest. Chicago. October 22, 2015. Archived from the original on April 19, 2021.
- Ida B. Wells-Barnett Museum. Cultural Center of African American History. Holly Springs, Mississippi: The Ida B. Wells Memorial Foundation. 2024.
1. "About [the museum]". 2024. Archived from the original on October 7, 2024.
2. Museum Home Page. Archived from the original on February 17, 2017.
3. "About [the museum]" (IBW Foundation). Archived from the original on June 5, 2020.
- Ida B. Wells Festival (June 28, 2025). "Celebrating Bronzeville". 4th Annual Ida B. Wells Festival. Bronzeville–Black Metropolis National Heritage Area.
- Johnston, Hank; Oliver, Pamela Elaine, eds. (2020). Racialized Protest and the State: Resistance and Repression in a Divided America. Taylor & Francis. ISBN 978-0-367-26353-9. LCCN 2020008052. OCLC 1159575442.
- Jones, Wendy D. "Wendy Jones". AALBC.com (autobiography). Tampa, Florida: AALBC.com, LLC (African American Literature Book Club). The article is a short autobiography connected to the author's 2017 book, An Extraordinary Life: Josephine E. Jones [née Josephine Ebaugh; 1920–2017] – the author's mother. "I come from a family of storytellers. My mother and my grandmother [Anna Mae Ebaugh, née Nance; 1888–1982] were my first teachers."
- Jordan, Brucella Wiggins (2003). Ida B. Wells, Catherine Impey, and Trans-Atlantic Dimensions of the Nineteenth-Century Anti-Lynching Movement (PhD dissertation, history, Eberly College of Arts and Sciences, Department of History). Morgantown: West Virginia University. Archived from the original on March 19, 2022. OCLC 52488224, 1158307686.
- "Key Findings". Lynching in America – Confronting the Legacy of Racial Terror (PDF) (eBook) (3rd ed.). Montgomery, Alabama: Equal Justice Initiative. 2017. OCLC 1160165955. Archived (PDF) from the original on August 21, 2020.
  Citing → Tolnay, Stewart Emory; Beck, Elwood Meredith (1992). A Festival of Violence: An Analysis of Southern Lynchings, 1882–1930. University of Illinois Press. ISBN 0-252-06413-5. LCCN 94-7396. OCLC 1015166019.
  Quoting → Raper, Arthur Franklin (1936). The Mob Still Rides: A Review of the Lynching Record, 1931–1935. Atlanta, Georgia: Commission on Interracial Cooperation. OCLC 1130312430.
- King, Oona; Parris, Matthew (August–October 2014). "Baroness Oona King on Ida B Wells". BBC Radio 4 (audio archive of a radio broadcast). Great Lives; Series 34; Episode 3 of 9. Bristol. Archived from the original on June 13, 2020.
- Klinger, Jerry (July 15, 2019). "Jewish Group Helps Dedicate Ida Wells-Barnett Marker". San Diego Jewish World. Archived from the original on July 17, 2019.
- Levesque, Faron (April 26, 2024). "Ida B. Wells and People's Grocery". The MIT Press Reader. MIT Press. Archived from the original on May 25, 2024.
- Liles, [Stuart] Stinson (August 7, 2021). "Memphis Unveils New Ida. B. Wells Monument". Southern Hollows (podcast and blog of Stinson Liles). Archived from the original on August 7, 2021.
- MacDaniel, Marian Dana (October 28, 1891). "Single Tax News." "Single Tax Letter Writers". The Standard. Vol. 10, no. 17 (whole no. 253). New York: Henry George (1839–1897). p. 327 – via Internet Archive.
- MacDonald, John Frederick, ed. (1989). Richard Durham's 'Destination Freedom' – Scripts From Radio's Black Legacy, 1948–1950. New York, Westport, Connecticut, London: Praeger Publishing. p. x. LCCN 88-35686; ISBN 0-2759-3138-2, 978-0-2759-3138-4; OCLC 18986323 (all editions).

See Richard Durham and Destination Freedom

1. Via Internet Archive (limited preview only). 1989. ISBN 978-0-275-93138-4.
- MacDonald, John Frederick (January 1978). "Radio's Black Heritage: Destination Freedom, 1948–1950". The Phylon Quarterly. 39 (1): 66–73. doi:10.2307/274433. JSTOR 274433. ISSN 0885-6826 (journal); (journal); doi:10.2307/274433 (article); JSTOR 274433 (article); OCLC 57182668 (article).
- Mann, Susan A. (Summer 2011). "Pioneers of U.S. Ecofeminism and Environmental Justice". Feminist Formations. 23 (2). Baltimore: Johns Hopkins University Press: 1–25. doi:10.1353/ff.2011.0028. ISSN 2151-7363. JSTOR 41301654. OCLC 752343699. S2CID 146349456.
- Matthews, Dasha (February 21, 2018). "Ida B. Wells: Suffragist, Feminist, and Leader". info.umkc.edu – University of Missouri–Kansas City. Archived from the original on November 4, 2020.
- McBride, Jennifer (1999) [c. 1998]. "Ida B. Wells: Crusade for Justice" (online). Webster University. Archived from the original on June 2, 2023.
- McCluskey, Audrey Thomas (2014). A Forgotten Sisterhood: Pioneering Black Women Educations and Activists in the Jim Crow South. Rowman & Littlefield. ISBN 978-1-4422-1138-4. OCLC 883647209.
- McKinney, Megan (August 19, 2018). "Ida B. Wells: The 'Drive' in Her Name – A Long Wait for a Distinguished Lady" (online). Vintage. Chicago Classic Magazine. Archived from the original on October 30, 2020.
- McMurry, Linda O. (1998). To Keep the Waters Troubled: The Life of Ida B. Wells. Oxford University Press. ISBN 978-0-19-513927-3.
- Mississippi Writers Trail (November 7, 2019). "Historical Marker: Ida B. Wells". Mississippi Arts Commission. Jackson: Mississippi Arts Commission. Archived from the original on August 1, 2020.
- Mitchell, Judylynn (November 11, 1979). "Daughter of Slave Fights for Racial Justice". The Daily Times. Vol. 56, no. 343. Salisbury, Maryland. p. D13. Archived from the original on October 30, 2020 – via Newspapers.com.
- Moses, Wilson Jeremiah (1978). The Golden Age of Black Nationalism, 1850–1925. Hamden, Connecticut: Archon Books, an imprint of Shoe String Press. p. 109. ISBN 978-0-208-01690-4 – via Internet Archive (Boston Public Library; withdrawn).

LCCN 77-14566.
ISBN 0-2080-1690-2, 978-0-2080-1690-4 (hardcover; 1st ed).
ISBN 0-1952-0639-8, 978-0-1952-0639-5 (hardcover; 1988 ed).

- Murphy, Benjamin J. (June 2021) [February 26, 2021]. "'Multiplied Without Number': Lynching, Statistics, and Visualization in Ida B. Wells, Mark Twain, and W.E.B. Du Bois". American Literature. 93 (2): 195–226. doi:10.1215/00029831-9003554. S2CID 233966886. ISSN 0002-9831 (journal); OCLC 9061979762 (article).
- Myrick-Harris, Clarissa (July 2002) [online version: June 30, 2002]. "Against All Odds". Smithsonian. 33 (4): 70–77. Archived from the original on November 12, 2020. ISSN 0037-7333. OCLC 718515121 (all editions). OCLC 96987499 (all editions).
- "NABJ: Ida B. Wells Award". www.nabj.org. National Association of Black Journalists (NABJ). Archived from the original on July 31, 2018.
- "National Afro-American Council". NKAA – Notable Kentucky African Americans Database (encyclopedic entry). Lexington: University of Kentucky Libraries. Special Collections. OCLC 54673947.
- "National Association of Colored Women's Clubs". Encyclopædia Britannica (online). Encyclopedia Britannica. August 4, 2017.
- National Women's Hall of Fame (November 15, 1988). "Ida B. Wells-Barnett". Seneca Falls, New York. (Selected in 1986, posthumously inducted in a ceremony at the Margaret Woodbury Strong Museum in Rochester on November 15, 1988.)
- NWHM (National Women's History Museum). Alexandria, Virginia.
1. "Historic Change: Celebrating the Life and Legacy Ida B. Wells". Chicago: at the DuSable Black History Museum and Education Center. February 12, 2025. Archived from the original on January 17, 2025.
2. Norwood, Arlisha Renae (2017). "Ida B. Wells-Barnett". Revised in 2025 by Corina Gonzalez. Archived from the original on April 23, 2025.
- Nettles, Arionne Alyssa (November 4, 2019). "Ida B. Wells' Lasting Impact on Chicago Politics and Power". WBEZ Chicago (local production). NPR affiliate.
- New York County Lawyers' Association (February 25, 2020). "18th Annual Ida B. Wells Barnett Award Reception" – via YouTube.
- Northwestern University. "Ida B. Wells Award". Archived from the original on July 2, 2019.
- "Our Creation Story". Chapel Hill: Ida B. Wells Society for Investigative Reporting, UNC Hussman School of Journalism and Media – via idabwellssociety.org.
- Paisana, Joanne (2016). "Playing the Transatlantic Card: The British Anti-Lynching Campaigns of Ida B. Wells". Diacrítica. 30 (2): 187–203. hdl:1822/46204. S2CID 164398439.
- Palmer, Stephanie C. (2009). "Wells-Barnett, Ida B". In Finkelman, Paul (ed.). Encyclopedia of African American History, 1896 to the Present: From the Age of Segregation to the Twenty-First Century. Vol. 5. Oxford University Press. pp. 105–108. doi:10.1093/acref/9780195301731.013.46339. ISBN 978-0-1951-6779-5. LCCN 2008034263. OCLC 828073382.
1. Via Internet Archive. ISBN 978-0-19-516779-5.
2. Via Google Books (limited preview).
- Pavithra, Mohan (August 8, 2018). "How These Women Raised $42k in a Day for an Ida B. Wells Monument". Fast Company (Blog).
- Peavey, Linda; Smith, Ursula (April 2019). "A Determined Quest for Equality – How Ida B. Wells Battled Jim Crow in Memphis". Memphis (monthly magazine). 44 (1). Contemporary Media: 46–49. Alternate link Archived March 19, 2022, at the Wayback Machine via ISSUU (a version of this story was published in the June 1983 issue of Memphis).
- Perkins, Kathy A.; Stephens, Judith Louise (Judith Stephens-Lorenz), eds. (1998). Strange Fruit: Plays on Lynching by American Women. Bloomington & Indianapolis: Indiana University Press. pp. 366–408. ISBN 0-253-33356-3. LCCN 97-29605. OCLC 751143552 – via Internet Archive. (link via Google Books; Perkins, among other things, was, in 2007, inducted into the College of Fellows of the American Theatre (see CV Archived November 13, 2020, at the Wayback Machine); Stephens retired as Professor of Humanities and Theatre at Penn State Schuylkill, where she had been an educator since 1977)
1. "Michon Boston" (1962– ), pp. 366–367
2. Iola's Letter (1994), pp. 368–408
- Pinar, William Frederick (January 2001). "8 – White Women and the Campaign Against Lynching: Frances Willard, Jane Addams, Jesse Daniel Ames". Counterpoints. Vol. 163 – The Gender of Racial Politics and Violence in America: Lynching, Prison Rape, & the Crisis of Masculinity. 163. Frankfurt am Main: Peter Lang: 487–554. ISSN 1058-1634. JSTOR 42977758. OCLC 5792541764. (Pinar offers a description of the accusations made between Willard and Wells in England in 1894.)
- Pinar, William Frederick (2009). The Worldliness of a Cosmopolitan Education: Passionate Lives in Public Service. Routledge. ISBN 978-1-135-84485-1. LCCN 2008046092. OCLC 846131889.
- Portrait of Ida B. Wells (April 6, 2006). "A Celebration of Ida B. Wells". (i) Institute of Politics & (ii) Women and Public Policy Program (co-sponsors). The Institute of Politics at Harvard University (archived video of a forum; 1:08:15). Cambridge: Harvard Kennedy School Forum. John F. Kennedy, Jr., Forum. Archived from the original on February 23, 2017. (the video relates to the unveiling of several new portraits installed at the Kennedy School, including a poster reproduction of a painting of Ida B. Wells – painted by Patricia Watwood – commissioned by the school for $20,000 and installed April 2006 in the Fainsod Room of the Littauer Building, next Winston Churchill's portrait)
- Portwood, Shirley J. (2000). "Review of The Reason Why the Colored American Is Not in the World's Columbian Exposition: The Afro-American Contribution to Columbian Literature". Journal of the Illinois State Historical Society. 93 (4): 457–459. JSTOR 40193465. Review of the 1893 work, The Reason Why the Colored American Is Not in the World's Columbian Exposition: The Afro-American Contribution to Columbian Literature Archived October 20, 2020, at the Wayback Machine, by Ida B. Wells, Frederick Douglass, Irvine Garland Penn, and Ferdinand Barnett. Re-published 1999. Robert W. Rydell (ed.); Urbana and Chicago: University of Illinois Press
- Pulitzer Prize (May 4, 2020). "Announcement of the 2020 Pulitzer Prize Winners – Special Citation: Ida B. Wells". Archived from the original on May 4, 2020. "For her outstanding and courageous reporting on the horrific and vicious violence against African Americans during the era of lynching."
- "Quakers Against Racism: Catherine Impey and the Anti-Caste Journal". Quakers of the World. OCLC 607352452. Archived from the original on November 15, 2018..
- Ritchie, Donald A. (2007) [1997]. "Part 3. Society's Critics (1900–1945)" ... "Ida B. Wells-Barnett". American Journalists – Getting the Story. Oxford University Press. pp. 164–166. ISBN 978-0-19-532837-0. LCCN 96-29208. OCLC 1099791041 – via Internet Archive.
- Rooney, Terrie M.; Lemerand, Karen E., eds. (1998). "Ida B. Wells-Barnett". Contemporary Heroes and Heroines. Vol. 3. Gale Research. pp. 644–651. ISBN 978-0-7876-2215-2. OCLC 38956591 – via Internet Archive. (Also accessible online: "Ida B. Wells-Barnett" via the Christian Broadcasting Network. Retrieved November 7, 2020.)
- Schechter, Patricia (January 14, 2003). Ida B. Wells–Barnett and American Reform: 1880–1930. Chapel Hill: University of North Carolina Press. ISBN 978-0-8078-7546-9.
- Schultz, Rima Lunin [at Wikidata]; Hast, Adele, eds. (2001). Women Building Chicago, 1790–1990: A Biographical Dictionary. Bloomington: Indiana University Press. ISBN 978-0-253-33852-5 – via Internet Archive (Chicago Public Library; withdrawn). LCCN 58-162; ISBN 0-2533-3852-2, 978-0-2533-3852-5; OCLC 44573291 (all editions).
- Seymour, James B. Jr. (2006). "Wells-Barnett, Ida B". In Finkelman, Paul (ed.). Encyclopedia of African American History, 1896 to the Present: From the Age of Segregation to the Twenty-First Century. Vol. 3. Oxford University Press. pp. 333–334. doi:10.1093/acref/9780195301731.013.46339. ISBN 978-0-19-516777-1. LCCN 2005033701. OCLC 607234039.
- Sheriff, Stacey Ellen (December 2009). Rhetoric and Revision: Women's Arguments for Social Justice in the Progressive Era (PhD, Department of English). Pennsylvania State University. OCLC 783231213. Archived from the original on October 30, 2020.
- Singletax Conference (Second Annual). Held in Chicago, November 24, 25, and 26, 1911, at the La Salle Hotel. Cincinnati: Joseph Fels Funds Commission (Joseph Fels; 1853–1914). 1912. OCLC 58895852, 681870820, 1153966909. 152426991, 16098508, 644019689, 1340439147.
1. Via HathiTrust (Michigan). The Commission. 1912.
2. Via Google Books (Michigan).
- Smith, Jessie Carney; Phelps, Shirelle, eds. (2003). Notable Black American Women (3 Vols.). Detroit: Gale Research. LCCN 91-35074; OCLC 24468213 (all editions).
1. Book 1:. 1992 – via Internet Archive (San Rafael Public Library; withdrawn). ISBN 0-8103-4749-0, 978-0-8103-4749-6.
2. Smith, Jessie Carney (1996). Book 2:. VNR AG. ISBN 978-0-8103-9177-2 – via Internet Archive (Archbishop Mitty High School; withdrawn). ISBN 0-8103-9177-5, 978-0-8103-9177-2.
3. Book 3: Smith, Jessie Carnie. "Mary Jane Richardson Jones". 1992. pp. 336–339 – via Internet Archive (Northwestern Michigan College; withdrawn). ISBN 0-7876-6494-4, 978-0-7876-6494-7.
- Stansell, Christine (2010). The Feminist Promise – 1792 to the Present. New York: The Modern Library. pp. 126–128. ISBN 978-0-8129-7202-3. LCCN 2009026662. OCLC 770464849 – via Internet Archive.
- Stetz, Margaret Diane (Spring 2018). "Re-Embodying Ida B. Wells: A Figure of Resistance in American Popular Culture". Americana: The Journal of American Popular Culture, 1900 to Present (online). 17 (1). Hollywood. ISSN 1553-8931. Archived from the original on July 14, 2020.
- Stillion Southard, Belinda A. (2011). Militant Citizenship: Rhetorical Strategies of the National Woman's Party, 1913–1920. Texas A&M University Press. ISBN 978-1-60344-281-7. LCCN 2011005218. OCLC 892519712.
- Thompson, Mildred Isabelle (1990). Ida B. Wells-Barnett: An Exploratory Study of an American Black Woman, 1893–1930. Black Women in United States History. Vol. 15. Brooklyn: Carlton Publishing Group. ISBN 978-0-926019-21-8. LCCN 90-1399. OCLC 21035436 – via Internet Archive. (this book, Vol. 15 of a 16-vol. set, is an adaptation of Thompson's 1979 PhD dissertation at George Washington University; OCLC 78529680).
- Tichi, Celelia (2011). "Chapter 7". Civic Passions: Seven Who Launched Progressive America (end notes). Chapel Hill: University of North Carolina Press. ISBN 978-0-8078-7191-1. LCCN 2009011634. OCLC 1055332079 – via Internet Archive. (webcast via Library of Congress).
- Totten, Gary (Spring 2008). "Embodying Segregation: Ida B. Wells and the Cultural Work of Travel". African American Review. 42 (1): 47–60. JSTOR 40301303. ISSN 1062-4783 (journal); OCLC 9964471876 (article).
1. Via Internet Archive (Marygrove College, withdrawn).
- "Introduction". Truth-Telling: Frances Willard and Ida B. Wells (version 9 ed.). Evanston, Illinois: Frances Willard House Museum and Archives. Archived from the original on March 19, 2022.
- Type Investigations Fellowship. "Ida B. Wells Fellowship". www.typeinvestigations.org. New York: Type Investigations, formerly The Investigative Fund, the investigative newsroom of the Type Media Center. Archived from the original on July 12, 2019.
- University of Louisville. "Ida B. Wells Award". Archived from the original on February 23, 2017.
- University of Memphis. "Ida B. Wells Conference". Archived from the original on August 1, 2020.
- USPS: Women stamps (May 2020) [2015]. USPS Historian (ed.). "Women Subjects on United States Postage Stamps" (PDF). Postal History. Black Heritage. United States Postal Service. pp. 1–8. Archived from the original (PDF) on March 21, 2021.
- USPS: African American stamps (May 2020) [August 2013]. USPS Historian (ed.). "African American Subjects on United States Postage Stamps" (PDF). Postal History. United States Postal Service. pp. 1–6. Archived (PDF) from the original on January 29, 2018.
- Viagas, Robert (December 1, 1995). "AuDelCo Award Winners". Playbill (online). Archived from the original on January 31, 2018. See: AUDELCO.
- Wagner, Ella; et al., eds. (March 14, 2019). "Truth-Telling: Frances Willard and Ida B. Wells, Introduction". Frances Willard House Museum and Archives. Evanston, Illinois. Archived from the original on April 12, 2019.
- Wells, Ida Bell (1970). Duster, Alfreda (ed.). Crusade for Justice: The Autobiography of Ida B. Wells. University of Chicago Press. ISBN 0-226-89344-8. LCCN 73108837. OCLC 8162296586 – via Internet Archive.
- "Wells, Ida B., Papers, 1884–1976". Joseph Regenstein Library, University of Chicago. Special Collections. 1978. OCLC 19496699. Archived from the original on May 30, 2023.
- Wikimapia. "Ida B. Wells Homes Chicago, Illinois". wikimapia.org. Archived from the original on January 11, 2012.
- Willard, Frances (October 23, 1890). "The Race Problem – Miss Willard on the Political Puzzle of the South". New York Voice (weekly pro-prohibition newspaper). Vol. 7. New York, Astor Place: Funk & Wagnalls Company. OCLC 32278752 – via Frances Willard House Museum and Archives, Chicago. (the article is an interview with Willard by the New York Voice when she was in Atlanta in October 1890 for WCTU's annual convention, wherein she stated: "The grog shop is its center of power. The safety of woman, of childhood, of the home is menaced in a thousand localities at this moment, so that men dare not go beyond the sight of their own roof tree.")
- Yaeger, Lynn (October 21, 2015). "The African-American Suffragists History Forgot". Vogue (online). Archived from the original on March 30, 2018.
- Zackodnik, Teresa (July 2005). "Ida B. Wells and 'American Atrocities' in Britain". Women's Studies International Forum. 28 (4): 259–273. doi:10.1016/j.wsif.2005.04.012.
Audio/visual media
- Recording: Destination Freedom: "Woman With a Mission: The Story of Ida B. Wells" (Originally broadcast on Chicago radio station, WMAQ). Episode 41. April 10, 1949. OCLC 1323169789, 44432615.
1. Via YouTube. audio only; uploaded January 4, 2025, by Old Time Radio Researchers. January 4, 2025 www.otrr.org). Retrieved July 25, 2025.
2. Via YouTube (audio only; uploaded January 12, 2025, by Gold World Entertainment). January 11, 2025.
3. Via Internet Archive.
Script is in the Richard Durham Papers, Vivian G. Harsh Research Collection of Afro-American History and Literature at the Chicago Public Library's Woodson Regional Library, box 2, folder 15. OCLC 1356506317.

Cast:
- Wezlynn "Weez" Margaret Develle Tildon (1918–1993), narrator, speaking as Ida B. Wells
- Emma Janice Kingslow (1924–1984)
- Jonathan Hole (1904–1998)
- George Wallace Kluge (1916–2004)
- Jack Lester (né Jack Lester Swineford; 1915–2004)
- Fred Pinkard (1920–2004)
- Jess Pugh (né Jessie Maren Pugh; 1869–1962). Her grandson, Joel Dean Pugh (1940–1969)
Production:
- Richard Isadore Durham (1917–1984), writer
- Homer Raymond Heck (1907–1984), producer, director
Music:
- Emil Soderstrom (né Emil Otto Edvard Söderström; 1901–1972), composer
- Elwyn Pritchard Owen (1891–1972), organist
- José P. Bethancourt (1906–1978), tympani
Announcer:
- Charles "Gus" Chan (né Charles Gustave Adalpho Chan; 1913–1990), announcer

News media
- Aberdeen Journal and Daily Advertiser for the North of Scotland. No. 11927. Aberdeen, Scotland. April 24, 1893. pp. 1 (column 1), 4 (column 5), 5 (column 1). ISSN 2632-1165; OCLC 271575877 (all editions) (1878–1901).
1. Page 1: "Public Notices" "Lynch Law in the United States" – via Newspapers.com.
2. Page 4: "Lynch Law in the United States" – via Newspapers.com.
3. Page 5 "A Pleasant Sunday Afternoon" – via Newspapers.com.
- "A Bright Woman". St. Joseph Daily News. Vol. 17, no. 9. St. Joseph, Missouri. June 11, 1895. p. 7. OCLC 13745156 – via Newspapers.com. (also LCCN sn86063691)
- Associated Press (July 1–2, 2021). "A Monument To Journalist, Civil Rights Activist Ida B. Wells Is Unveiled in Chicago".
See The Light of Truth Ida B. Wells National Monument
1. Associated Press blog. July 1, 2021. Archived from the original on July 1, 2021.
2. NPR blog. July 1, 2021. Archived from the original on July 4, 2021.
3. Philadelphia Tribune. July 2, 2021. ProQuest 2551713505 – via ProQuest 2551713505 (US Newsstream database). LCCN sn83-45144; ISSN 0746-956X; OCLC 2266077 (all editions).
4. "Monument unveiled to activist, journalist Ida B. Wells". Commercial Appeal. Vol. 180, no. 183. Memphis. July 2, 2021. p. 7A – via Newspapers.com. LCCN sn90-39717, LCCN sn86-90533, LCCN sn83-1763, LCCN sn20-50623; ISSN 0745-4856; OCLC 6671879 (all editions).
- Balgarnie, Florence (August 19, 1894). "John Bull Aroused – As a Result of Ida B. Wells' Visit the English Appoint an Anti-Lynching Committee" – London, July 30 – To the Editor". The Sunday Inter Ocean. Vol. 23, no. 143. p. 2 – via Newspapers.com. LCCN sn85-38321; OCLC 12305135 (all editions).
- Bonfiglio, Jeremy Dean (February 19, 2012). "Great Grandson of Influential Civil Rights Pioneer Ida B. Wells Keeps Her Legacy Alive". The Herald-Palladium. Vol. 127, no. 50. St. Joseph, Michigan. pp. 1–2 (section C). ISBN 978-3-8472-0182-3. OCLC 669922511. Archived from the original on November 1, 2020 – via Newspapers.com.
- Bradford Daily Telegraph (June 26, 1894). "Considerable Interest Was Felt". Bradford, Yorkshire, England. p. 2 – via British Newspaper Archive. LCCN sn88-88283; ISSN 0307-1235; OCLC 18562585 (all editions).
- Bradford Weekly Telegraph (June 30, 1894). "Considerable Interest Was Felt". Bradford, Yorkshire, England. p. 4 col.4 – via British Newspaper Archive. LCCN sn88-88287; OCLC 751652946 (all editions) 1528657450, 1528658576, 1528662207, 1528663423, 1528662014, 18563098.
- Burgess, Katherine (October 26, 2020). "Ida B. Wells was driven out of Memphis in 1892. She might soon have her own statue there". USA Today. "One of the loudest voices speaking out against Wells in Memphis was Edward Ward Carmack, editor of the Memphis Commercial, the predecessor of The Commercial Appeal. He demanded that White citizens retaliate against 'the Black wench' for her writings against the lynchings."
- Chase, William Calvin, ed. (October 22, 1892). "Miss Ida B. Wells – A Lecture". (3-column, tombstone-style advertisement). The Washington Bee (weekly newspaper, Saturdays). Vol. 11, no. 19. Washington, D.C.: Bee Publishing. p. 3. ISSN 1940-7424. LCCN sn84025891. OCLC 10587828. Archived from the original on November 24, 2021 – via Chronicling America.
- Chicago Daily Tribune (1872–1963); Chicago Tribune (1963–current). LCCN sn84-31492 (1872–1963); ISSN 2572-9985 (1872–1963), LCCN sn83-45111 (1963–current); ISSN 1085-6706 (1963–current).
1. "Mrs. Ida Barnett, Colored Leader, 62, Dies Suddenly" (transcript copy). Vol. 80, no. 72. March 25, 1931. p. 1. Archived (PDF) from the original on April 8, 2015 – via Black Women’s Suffrage Digital Collection (DPLA).
2. Burleigh, Nina (August 21, 1988). "Hall of Fame Will Induct 10". Vol. 142, no. 234. p. 2, section 6. Archived from the original on November 5, 2020 – via Newspapers.com.
3. Sama, Dominic (February 4, 1990). "Issues Honor Ida B. Wells, Judicial System". Vol. 143, no. 35 (Final ed.). p. 11 (section 14) – via Newspapers.com.
4. Grossman, Ron (June 23, 2013). "Illinois Women Win the Right to Vote" (blog ed.). "A New Voice, a New Vote" (print ed.). Chicago Flashback.
  1. Blog ed.. June 23, 2013. Archived from the original on August 3, 2021. (archived ed.) ProQuest 1370403632 (US Newsstream database).
  2. Print ed.. Vol. 166, no. 174. June 23, 2013. p. 23 (section 1) – via Newspapers.com. ProQuest 1370421311 (US Newsstream database).
5. Pratt, Gregory; Byrne, John (July 25, 2018). "Ida B. Wells Gets Her Street – City Council Approves Renaming Congress in Her Honor". Contributor: Lolly Bowean.
  1. Blog ed.. Archived from the original on June 9, 2019. (archived ed.) ProQuest 2080840006, ProQuest 2076925880 (US Newsstream database).
  2. Print ed.. Vol. 171, no. 207. June 23, 2013. pp. 1, 9 (section 1) – via Newspapers.com. ProQuest 2076096245 (US Newsstream database).
6. Greene, Morgan (May 4, 2020). "Ida B. Wells Receives Pulitzer Prize Citation: 'The Only Thing She Really Had Was the Truth'".
  1. Blog ed.. May 4, 2020. Archived from the original on May 5, 2020. (archived ed.).
  2. Print ed.. Vol. 172. May 5, 2020. p. 5 (section 1) – via Newspapers.com. ProQuest 2398022827 (US Newsstream database).
7. Whiting, Susan (February 14, 2025). "Chicago Activist Ida B. Wells Changes the Face of American Currency".
  1. Blog ed.. February 14, 2025. Archived from the original on February 17, 2025. (archive ed.).
  2. Print ed.. Vol. 177, no. 46. February 15, 2025. p. 5 – via Newspapers.com. ProQuest 3166965294 (US Newsstream database).
- Collins, Sam P. K. (April 4–10, 2019). "D.C.'s Newest Middle School Named After Ida B. Wells". Education. The Washington Informer. Vol. 54, no. 25. ISSN 0741-9414 – via ISSUU. Digitized print edition. Archived March 19, 2022, at the Wayback Machine The online edition, here, is dated March 26, 2019.
- Danielle, Britni (March 8, 2018). "The New York Times Is Finally Giving Ida B. Wells Her Due". Essence. Archived from the original on March 31, 2019.
- Heather-Lea, Patricia (March 30, 2017). "Letter to the Editor: Ida Wells an inspiring heroine for International Women's Day". Addison County Independent. Vol. 71, no. 13. Middlebury, Vermont. Archived from the original on November 4, 2020.
- Hentoff, Nat (March 28, 1994). "One Teacher's Struggle to Overcome Bigotry". Pasadena Star-News. p. A10. Archived from the original on March 19, 2022 – via Newspapers.com.
- "Horrible but True". Cleveland Gazette. Vol. 9, no. 23. January 16, 1892. p. 1 – via Chronicling America. LCCN sn83-35386; ISSN 2998-3452; OCLC 9754948 (all editions).
- "Birmingham Blue Plaque Unveiled to Commemorate Civil Rights Activist Ida B. Wells". I Am Birmingham (digital-only news). Birmingham, England: Adam Yosef. February 14, 2012. Archived from the original on August 18, 2020.
- Jalabi, Raya (July 16, 2015). "Ida B Wells, African American Activist, Honored by Google". The Guardian (online). London.
- Linton, Caroline; Dickerson, Caitlin (March 8, 2018). "'We Want to Address These Inequities of Our Time': NYT Starts New Series Featuring Overlooked Obituaries". CBS News (online video & text). Archived from the original on March 31, 2019.
- New York Times (The). ISSN 0362-4331 (print), ISSN 1553-8095 (online).
1. Dickerson, Caitlin (March 9, 2018) [March 8, 2018]. Padnani, Amisha (Amy); Bennett, Jessica (eds.). "Ida B. Wells, Who Took on Racism in the Deep South With Powerful Reporting on Lynchings" (online). Women We Overlooked in 167 Years of New York Times Obituaries. The New York Times. Archived from the original on July 18, 2019.
  1. Dickerson, Caitlin (March 8, 2006). "Blog ed". The New York Times (National ed.). Archived from the original on July 18, 2019. Retrieved April 22, 2018, via New York Times.
  2. Print ed (Late, East Coast ed.). March 8, 2018. p. 4 (section F). ProQuest 2012602827 (U.S. Newsstream database).
2. Gates, Anita [at Wikidata] (July 23, 2006) [July 22, 2006]. Theater Review: "A Pageant Based on History, With Songs That Yearn" (National ed.). Archived from the original on November 3, 2020
  1. Gates, Anita (July 23, 2006). Blog ed (National ed.). Archived from the original on November 3, 2020. Retrieved June 22, 2010, via New York Times.
  2. Blog ed (nyregion). July 22, 2006. ProQuest 2226112015 (U.S. Newsstream database).
  3. Blog ed (nyregion). July 23, 2006. ProQuest 2226162425 (U.S. Newsstream database).
  4. Print ed (Late & National ed.). July 23, 2006. p. 14 (section CN). ProQuest 433371927 (U.S. Newsstream database).
3. Staples, Brent (July 10, 2021). "How the White Press Wrote off Black America". Archived from the original on March 1, 2025.
  1. Staples, Brent (July 10, 2021). Blog ed. Archived from the original on March 1, 2025. Retrieved April 1, 2022, via New York Times.
  2. Blog ed (nyregion). July 10, 2021. ProQuest 2549943888 (U.S. Newsstream database).
  3. Print ed (Late & National ed.). July 10, 2021. p. 6 (section SR). ProQuest 2549987171 (U.S. Newsstream database).
- Rogers, Phil (April 11, 2018). "Great-Granddaughter of Ida B. Wells Looks to Erect Memorial". NBC Chicago. Archived from the original on January 22, 2021.
- Scotsman (The) (April 29, 1893). "Lynch Law in the Southern States". No. 15547. Edinburgh. p. 8 (column 7 of 7). LCCN sn94-48067; ISSN 0307-5850; OCLC 614655655 (all editions) (publication); ProQuest 485093820 (subscription required) (article).
- Shaw, Nichole (June 30, 2021). "Unveiling of Ida B. Wells Monument in Bronzeville met with 'joy, excitement, appreciation and humbleness'". Chicago Sun-Times. Archived from the original on July 4, 2021.
- Slevin, Peter (July 10, 2018). "History: Movement to Honor Anti-Lynching Crusader and Journalist Ida B. Wells in Chicago Is Gaining Momentum, and Is 'Long Overdue'". Good Black News. News aggregator and blog of Facebook. (www.goodblacknews.org). Archived from the original on July 13, 2018. Originally published June 20, 2018, in The Lily of The Washington Post (link), which, in turn, was an adaptation of a story in The Washington Post by Peter Slevin published June 15, 2015, titled "'You Can't Just Gloss Over This History': The Movement to Honor Ida B. Wells Gains Momentum." Archived November 6, 2020, at the Wayback Machine
- Smith, David (November 11, 2018). "Ida B Wells: The Unsung Heroine of the Civil Rights Movement". The Guardian (online) (US ed.). London.
- St Andrews Citizen (May 6, 1893). "Lynch Law in the Southern States" (weekly). No. 1208. St Andrews, Fife, Scotland. p. 2. LCCN sn88-63579; ISSN 1354-6090; OCLC 18096463 (all editions).
- University of Chicago Library (May 8, 2019). "On the Road: Anti-Lynching Lectures Around the U.S. and Abroad" (Newspaper clippings annotated by Ida B. Wells). Exhibition on view from May 8, 2019 – The Hanna Holborn Gray Special Collections Research Center. Collections & Exhibits: Exhibits: "A Voice for Justice: The Life and Legacy of Ida B. Wells". Archived from the original on March 8, 2022.

Annotated newspaper clippings cited:

1. Birmingham Daily Gazette (May 18, 1993). "Lynch Law in the United States – Protest by Birmingham Audiences". Vol. 62, no. 8084. p. 8 (column 1) – via Newspapers.com. OCLC 17643638 (all editions).
2. Birmingham Daily Post. Birmingham, England. LCCN sn88-63164; ISSN 0963-7915; OCLC 17643620 (all editions).
  1. "Correspondence" – "A Wearied Councillor's Protest" (letter to the editor of the Daily Post, from "a City Councillor," May 12 [1893]). No. 10888. May 13, 1893. p. 5 (column 6).
  2. "Correspondence" – "A Wearied Councillor's Protest" (letter to the editor of the Daily Post, from "a City Councillor," May 12 [1893]). No. 10888. May 13, 1893. p. 5 (column 6).
  3. "Correspondence" – "Lynch Law in the United States" (letter to the editor of the Daily Post, from "Ida B. Wells," May 14 [1893]). 10890. May 16, 1893. p. 4 (last column, column 8).
3. The Daily Inter-Ocean (August 4, 1894). "Against Lynching." – "Ida B. Wells and Her Recent Mission in England" – "Crusade for Humanity" – "Some Gubernatorial Protests and London Editorials" – "British Emigrants Warned Away From the South Until Negro Lynching Ceases". Vol. 23, no. 133, Part Second (column 1). Chicago. p. 9 – via Newspapers.com.
- Washington, Linn (February 14, 2019). "Ida Wells Barnett Honored in Birmingham, England". The Chicago Crusader (online). Archived from the original on March 31, 2019.
- Washington Post, The.

LCCN sn82-14727 (1877–1954)
LCCN sn84-24539 (1954–1959)
LCCN sn84-31523 (1959–1973)
LCCN sn79-2172 (1974–current)
ISSN 2641-0702 (1877–1954)
ISSN 0190-8286
ISSN 2641-9599
ISSN 2641-077X (1959–1973)
ISSN 0190-8286 (1974–current)
OCLC 8787120 (all editions) (1877–1954)
OCLC 10942830 (all editions) (1954–1959)
OCLC 2269359 (all editions) (1959–1973)
OCLC 2269358 (all editions) (1974–current)

1. "Miss Ida B. Wells About to Marry". No. 5954. June 13, 1895. p. 3 (column 4; bottom). Archived from the original on January 11, 2012.
  1. Via Newspapers.com.
  2. Pdf via ProQuest. ProQuest 139669998. ProQuest 139669998 (database: ProQuest Historical Newspapers: The Washington Post).
2. Johnson, Nicholas (January 29, 2014). "Negroes and the Gun: [The Black Tradition of Arms] 'A Winchester in every Black home'" (blog). The Volokh Conspiracy. Archived from the original on March 9, 2023. (archived ed.); ProQuest 1492939216 (January 29, 2024, ed.), ProQuest 1493820750 (January 30, 2014, ed.), ProQuest 1493820867 (January 31, 2014, ed.) (US Newsstream database).
  "... The lesson this teaches and which every Afro-American should ponder well, is that the Winchester rifle should have a place of honor in every black home, and it should be used for that protection which the law refuses to give." – Ida B. Wells, from Southern Horrors. Chapter 6: "Self Help". p. 23.
3. Cavna, Michael (July 16, 2015). "Here's Why Google Doodle Salutes Fearless, Peerless Word-Warrior Ida B. Wells: Artist Matt Cruickshank's Google Doodle Celebrates the 153rd Birthday of a Civil-Rights Icon Who Boldly Refused To Surrender the Seat of Power" ("Retropolis" – a history blog). Archived from the original on January 14, 2019. (archived ed.) ProQuest 1697192406 (US Newsstream database).
4. Brown, DeNeed L. (April 26, 2018). "'Fearless' Ida B. Wells Honored by New Lynching Museum for Fighting Racial Terrorism: Born Enslaved, the Teacher and Journalist Risked Her Life To Investigate Lynchings and Crusade Against Them" ("Retropolis" – a history blog). Archived from the original on April 27, 2018. (archived ed.) ProQuest 2031227553 (US Newsstream database).
- Wormser, Richard. "The Rise and Fall of Jim Crow – Jim Crow Stories: Ida B. Wells Forced Out of Memphis (1892)". www.thirteen.org. WNET. Archived from the original on November 28, 2018.
- Young, Jenny (January 26, 2021). "PPS Changes Wilson HS Name to Honor Ida B. Wells-Barnett". Portland, Oregon: KOIN. Archived from the original on February 3, 2021.
Government and genealogical archives
- Flowers, Mary E. (February 12, 2012). "House Resolution 770: Ida B. Wells Day in the State of Illinois". House Journal, Ninety-Seventh General Assembly (PDF). Illinois House of Representatives 104th Legislative Day, Regular & Perfunctory Session. pp. 7–8. Archived (PDF) from the original on November 1, 2020. "... presented to Michelle Duster, great-granddaughter of Ida B. Wells for efforts to protect her legacy."
- Journal of the Senate of the 48th General Assembly of the State of Illinois. Illinois Senate (Regular Biennial Session ed.). Springfield: Illinois State Journal Co. 1914 – via Internet Archive.
- Journal of the House of Representatives of the 48th General Assembly of the State of Illinois. Illinois House of Representatives (Regular Biennial Session ed.). Springfield: Illinois State Journal Co. 1914. Archived from the original on December 4, 2020 – via HathiTrust.
- United States Mint. United States Department of the Treasury.
1. Martin, Brian J. (January 2, 2025). "Ida B. Wells and the Light of Truth". Archived from the original on March 9, 2025.
2. "United States Mint Announces 2025 American Women Quarters Program Coins" (press release). October 17, 2023. Archived from the original on December 1, 2023. ProQuest 2878303165 Targeted News Service (US Newsstream database).
3. "A Historic First: American Women Quarters Program". "History of the Program: 2022, 2023, 2024, 2025: Ida B. Wells – Investigative Journalist, Suffragist, and Civil Rights Activist". "Design Selection Process". 2022 [2025]. Archived from the original on November 27, 2024.

=== Primary references to linked inline notes ===
Books, journals, magazines, academic papers, pamphlets
- Wells, Ida B. (1894) [1892–1893]. The Red Record – Tabulated Statistics and Alleged Causes of Lynchings in the United States, 1892 – 1893 – 1894. Chicago: Donohue & Henneberry – via Frederick Douglass Papers, Library of Congress, Manuscript Division. OCLC 26846545 (all editions). Library of Congress, Manuscript/Mixed Material – www.loc.gov/item/mfd.40021. Also transcribed by Project Gutenberg → e-book No. 17977 (released February 8, 2005).
- Wells, Ida B.; Douglass, Frederick; Penn, Garland I.; Bernett, Ferdinand Lee (August 30, 1893). Wells, Ida B. (ed.). The Reason Why: The Colored American Is Not in the World's Columbian Exposition. Chicago: Miss Ida B. Wells, 128 S. Clark Street. Archived from the original on October 20, 2020 – via UPenn Libraries.

Microfilm of original:

LCCN 22-16583

1999 re-print:

LCCN 98-58021
ISBN 0252024737, 9780252024733
ISBN 0252067843, 9780252067846

Manuscript original:

LCCN mss1187900478

WorldCat:

OCLC 702372532 (all editions).

.

- Wells, Ida B. (1892). Southern Horrors: Lynch Law in All Its Phases. New York: New York Age Print. Archived from the original on September 17, 2024 – via Schomburg Center for Research in Black Culture, Manuscripts, Archives and Rare Books Division, New York Public Library. Southern Horrors at the New York Public Library; NYPL b11662711.
- Wells, Ida B. (May 31 – June 1, 1909). "Lynching, Our National Crime". Proceedings of the National Negro Conference, 1909 (Morning Session, June 1, 1909). Preface by William English Walling (1877–1936). New York. LCCN 69-18544 (1969 reprint from a copy at the Harvard Library); OCLC 16530911 (all editions).
1. Via Internet Archive. [New York?. pp. 174–179 – via Internet Archive (New York Public Library).
2. Via Blackpast.org. September 22, 2008. Archived from the original on May 13, 2024.
News media
- Wells, Ida B. (1911). "The Negro's Quest for Work". Chicago Daily News. OCLC 11473657 (all editions).
1. Reprinted by the New York Call (July 23, 1911). "The Negro's Quest for Work". LCCN sn83-30226. OCLC 9448923 (all editions).
2. Transcribed and published by The Black Worker (1900 to 1919). Vol. 5. Foner, Philip Sheldon (1910–1994); Lewis, Ronald L. (eds.). Part I: "Economic Condition of the Black Worker at the Turn of the Twentieth-Century". Temple University Press. pp. 38–39 – JSTOR j.ctvn1tcpp.5. OCLC 1129353605 (all editions).

=== General references (not linked to notes) ===
- Buechler, Steven Michael (1990). Women's Movements in the United States: Woman Suffrage, Equal Rights, and Beyond. New Brunswick, New Jersey, and London: Rutgers University Press. ISBN 0-8135-1558-0. LCCN 89-49083. OCLC 925227511.
- Campbell, Karlyn Kohrs (November 1986). "Style and Content in the Rhetoric of Early Afro-American Feminists". Quarterly Journal of Speech. 72 (4). Routledge on behalf of the National Communication Association: 434–445. doi:10.1080/00335638609383786. eISSN 1479-5779. ISSN 0033-5630. LCCN 56053730. OCLC 4659161765.
- Davis, Elizabeth Lindsay (1922). The Story of the Illinois Federation of Colored Women's Clubs, 1900–1922. Chicago: Illinois Federation of Colored Women's Clubs. OCLC 830433285 – via Internet Archive. (Portraits from the book have been digitized and are archived at the New York Public Library, Schomburg Center for Research in Black Culture, Jean Blackwell Hutson Research and Reference Division; NYPL b11507686 – click on "Digital Gallery".)
- Effinger-Crichlow, Marta (2014) [2000]. "Chapter 1: 'Tell My People to Go West': Ida B. Wells". Staging Migrations Toward an American West: From Ida B. Wells to Rhodessa Jones. Boulder: University Press of Colorado. pp. 19–60. ISBN 978-1-60732-311-2. JSTOR j.ctt83jhx6. OCLC 867020572. (The author published a PhD dissertation under the same title in 2000 at Northwestern University; OCLC 1194713125.)
- Gere, Anne Ruggle; Robbins, Sarah Ruffing (Spring 1996). "Gendered Literacy in Black and White: Turn-of-the-Century African-American and European-American Club Women's Printed Texts". Signs. 21 (3): 643–678. doi:10.1086/495101. ISSN 0097-9740. JSTOR 3175174. OCLC 4639157083. S2CID 143859735. Archived from the original on August 1, 2020.
- Hendricks, Wanda Ann (1998). Gender, Race, and Politics in the Midwest: Black Club Women in Illinois. Bloomington & Indianapolis: Indiana University Press. ISBN 978-0-253-33447-3. LCCN 98-3091. OCLC 38520618.
- McCammon, Holly J. (March 2003). "'Out of the Parlors and Into the Streets': The Changing Tactical Repertoire of the U.S. Women's Suffrage Movements". Social Forces. 81 (3). University of Oxford Press: 787–818. doi:10.1353/sof.2003.0037. ISSN 0037-7732. OCLC 703594031. S2CID 143456172.
- Parker, Maegan F. (Spring 2008). "Desiring Citizenship: A Rhetorical Analysis of the Wells/Willard Controversy". Women's Studies in Communication. 31 (1): 56–78. doi:10.1080/07491409.2008.10162522. ISSN 0749-1409. OCLC 347075486. S2CID 143574671.
- Royster, Jacqueline Jones, ed. (2016) [1997]. Southern Horrors and Other Writings: The Anti-Lynching Campaign of Ida B. Wells, 1892–1900 (2nd ed.). Bedford/St. Martin's. ISBN 978-1-319-04904-1. OCLC 930997497.
