= Michelle Duster =

Author and public historian

Michelle Duster is an American author and public historian. She is known for her work to preserve the legacy of her great-grandmother, Ida B. Wells.

== Early life and education ==
Michelle Duster was born in Chicago to Maxine Duster and Donald L. Duster on December 20, 1963. Her father worked for Comed, and her mother was an English teacher and civic leader. She is the paternal great-granddaughter of Ida B. Wells. Growing up in Chicago's South Side, Duster began writing from an early age. While in high school, she entered essay contests and was a writer for the school newspaper. In 1985, she obtained her B.A. in Psychology from Dartmouth College. She went on to obtain an M.A. in Media Studies from The New School.

== Career ==
Duster has worked to preserve Ida B. Wells' legacy both through written publications and public history projects. She has written one children's book, Ida B. Wells, Voice of Truth: Educator, Feminist, and Anti-lynching Civil Rights Leader and one young adult biography, Ida B. The Queen: The Extraordinary Life and Legacy Of Ida B. Wells, about her great-grandmother. She has also edited two anthologies of Wells' writing.

She received the Multi-Generational Activist Award from the Illinois Human Rights Commission in 2019, and the 2019 Martin Luther King Jr. Social Justice Award from her alma mater, Dartmouth College.

== Selected bibliography ==
=== Children's literature ===
- — (2022). Ida B. Wells, Voice of Truth. New York City, New York: Henry Holt and Company. ISBN 9781250239464.
- — (2021). Ida B. the Queen: The Extraordinary Life and Legacy of Ida B. Wells. New York City, New York: Atria Publishing Group. ISBN 9781982129811.

=== Anthologies edited ===
- — (2008). Ida In Her Own Words. Lansing, Illinois: Benjamin Williams Publishing. ISBN 978-0980239812.
- — (2010). Ida From Abroad. Lansing, Illinois: Benjamin Williams Publishing. ISBN 978-0980239898.
