= Memphis Free Speech =

Former African-American newspaper in Tennessee

The Memphis Free Speech was an African American newspaper founded in 1881 in Memphis, Tennessee, by the Reverend Taylor Nightingale, based at the Beale Street Baptist Church. In 1888 the publication's name was changed to the Memphis Free Speech and Headlight when Nightingale was joined by J. L. Fleming, a newspaperman from Crittenden County, Arkansas, who had previously edited the Marion Headlight "until a white mob 'liberated' the county from black rule and ran him out of town." The following year, Ida B. Wells was invited to contribute to the paper but declined to do so unless she was an equal partner, so with the agreement of Nightingale and Fleming she bought a one-third interest, becoming the editor while Fleming was the business manager and Nightingale the sales manager.

As an investigative journalist and campaigner against lynching, Wells wrote articles for the Free Speech and Headlight, including a notable editorial on May 21, 1892, refuting what she called the "that old threadbare lie that Negro men rape White women. If Southern men are not careful, a conclusion might be reached which will be very damaging to the moral reputation of their women." Days later, on May 27, 1892, a White mob ransacked the newspaper's office, destroying the building and its contents. As Wells would note in her diary: "I thought then it was the white southerner's chivalrous defense of his womanhood which caused the mob to destroy my paper, even though it was known that the truth had been spoken. I know now that it was an excuse to do what they had wanted to do before but had not dared because they had no good reason until the appearance of that famous editorial."

According to the Tennessee Encyclopedia, no copy of the Memphis Free Speech survives.
