= AALBC.com =

African American Literature Book Club website

- Screenshot Detail of Wikipedia's multilingual portal. Here, the project's largest language editions are shown.
- Available in: English
- Owner: AALBC.com
- Creator: Troy D. Johnson
- Website: aalbc.com
- Commercial: Yes
- Registration: Optional
- Current status: Online

AALBC.com, the African American Literature Book Club, is a website dedicated to books and film by and about African Americans and people of African descent, with content also aimed at African-American bookstores. AALBC.com publishes book and film reviews, author profiles, resources for writers and related articles. Launched in 1998, AALBC was founded by Troy Johnson. It targets primarily a middle-aged African-American female demographic. AALBC previously sold books through the Amazon.com affiliate program, and then started to operate its own warehousing and distribution program.

== See also ==
- African-American literature
- List of African-American writers
