= 2010 United States Senate elections in Illinois =

2010 United States Senate election in Illinois
- November 2, 2010
- Turnout: 49.35%
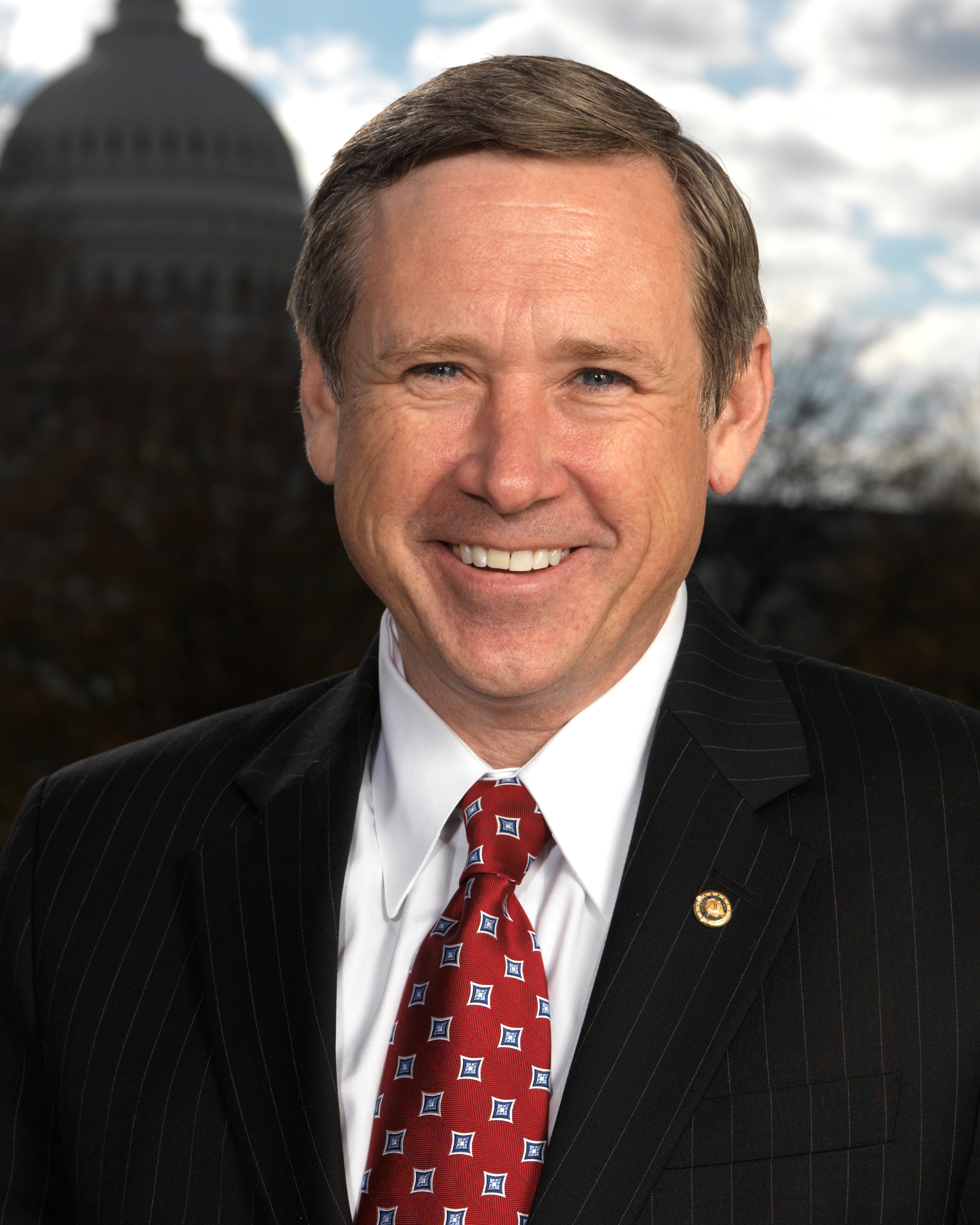

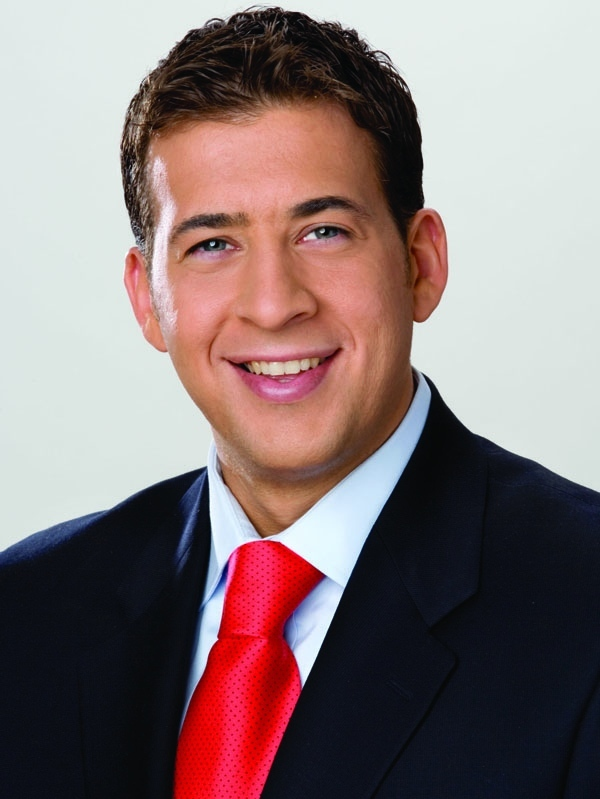
Candidate	Mark Kirk	Alexi Giannoulias
Party	Republican	Democratic
Regular election	1,778,698; 48.01%	1,719,478; 46.42%
Special election	1,677,729; 47.31%	1,641,486; 46.29%
- Kirk: 40–50% 50–60% 60–70% 70–80% Giannoulias: 40–50% 50–60% 60–70%
U.S. senator before election
Roland Burris (Note: In December 2008, Burris was appointed by Governor Rod Blagojevich to fill the vacancy caused by the resignation of Senator Barack Obama, who had been elected President of the United States.)
Democratic
Elected U.S. Senator
Mark Kirk
Republican

The 2010 United States Senate elections in Illinois took place on November 2, 2010. There were two ballot items for the same seat: a general election, to fill the Class 3 seat beginning with the 112th United States Congress beginning on January 3, 2011, and a special election to fill that seat for the final weeks of the 111th Congress. Roland Burris, who was appointed to fill the vacancy created by fellow Democrat Barack Obama's election to the presidency, did not run in either election.

The elections took place alongside 33 other elections to the United States Senate in other states, as well as elections to the United States House of Representatives and various state and local elections in Illinois and other states. The registered party primaries for the full term took place on February 2, 2010, the earliest state primary elections: Republicans nominated U.S. Representative Mark Kirk, Democrats nominated State Treasurer Alexi Giannoulias, and the Green Party nominated journalist LeAlan Jones. The Constitution Party and Libertarian Party submitted signatures to be on the ballot but were challenged; the result of the ensuing hearings was the Constitution Party's candidate being denied placement on the ballot, but the Libertarian Party's candidate Michael Labno was given ballot access.

On August 2, the United States District Court for the Northern District of Illinois ruled that the candidates appearing on the ballot for the replacement election would be the ones of the regular election, and that the special election would appear after the general election on the ballot. Kirk won both elections and was sworn in on November 29, 2010, resigning his House seat the same day.

As of 2026, this was the last time that Republicans won an Illinois U.S. Senate election, the last time the winner won a majority of counties in the state, and the last Illinois U.S. Senate race that was decided by a single-digit margin. Illinois was the toughest state (Note: Defined as how big the margin of victory was for the opposing party's presidential nominee in the most recent presidential election.) that either major party flipped in a Senate election since 1986, going from Obama's 25-point margin of victory to Kirk's nearly 2-point margin of victory.

== Background ==
Barack Obama, the former United States senator holding this seat, was elected president of the United States on November 4, 2008, and subsequently resigned from the Senate on November 16, 2008. Illinois law provides for the governor of Illinois, then Rod Blagojevich, to appoint replacements for Senate vacancies.

=== Burris' appointment ===
On December 9, 2008, the FBI arrested Governor Rod Blagojevich (D) on various corruption charges, most notably allegations that he attempted to sell the appointment to the vacant U.S. Senate seat. On December 31, 2008, Blagojevich nevertheless appointed former Illinois Attorney General Roland Burris to fill the vacancy. After initially seeking to exclude Burris, Senate Democrats relented, and Burris was seated on January 15, 2009.

Burris later declined to run for election.

For the state-run primary elections (Democratic, Republican, and Green), turnout was 21.74%, with 1,652,202 votes cast.

For the general election, the special election saw a turnout of 47.24%, with 3,545,984 votes cast. The regularly scheduled election saw a turnout of 49.35%, with 3,704,473 votes cast.

== Democratic primary ==
=== Candidates ===
- Alexi Giannoulias, Illinois treasurer
- David H. Hoffman, Chicago inspector general
- Cheryle Jackson, president of the Chicago Urban League
- Robert Marshall, doctor
- Jacob Meister, attorney (Note: Meister dropped out two days before the election and endorsed Giannoulias, but his name remained on the ballot.)

=== Campaign ===
Incumbent Senator Roland Burris did not run for a full term in 2010. Burris suffered from poor approval ratings and was investigated by the Sangamon County, Illinois State's Attorney for perjury. Although no criminal charges were filed against him, Burris faced an investigation by the Senate Ethics Committee.

Jacob Meister withdrew from campaigning and declared his support for Alexi Giannoulias on January 31, two days before the February 2 election.

=== Finances ===
Candidate	Cash on hand
Alexi Giannoulias	$2,429,549
Jacob Meister	$1,040,242
David Hoffman	$836,958
Cheryle Jackson	$317,828
Rob Marshall	$1,000

=== Polling ===
Poll source	Date(s) administered	Alexi Giannoulias	Cheryle Jackson	David Hoffman	Other	Undecided
Politico (report)	August 9, 2009	51%	21%	—	—	—
Chicago Tribune (report)	December 2–8, 2009	31%	17%	9%	4%	—
Chicago Tribune (report)	January 16–20, 2010	34%	19%	16%	4%	26%

=== Results ===
Democratic primary results by county Giannoulias: 20–30%; 30–40%; 40–50%; 50–60%; 60–70%; Hoffman: 20–30%; 30–40%; 40–50%; Marshall: 30–40%; Tie: 30–40%

Democratic primary results
Party	Candidate	Votes	%
Democratic	Alexi Giannoulias	351,120	38.9%
Democratic	David Hoffman	303,719	33.7%
Democratic	Cheryle Jackson	178,941	19.8%
Democratic	Robert Marshall	51,606	5.7%
Democratic	Jacob Meister	16,232	1.8%
Total votes		901,618	100.0%

== Republican primary ==
=== Candidates ===
- John Arrington, former Harvey alderman
- Patrick Hughes, chairman of Sensible Taxpayers Opposed to Increased Taxes
- Mark Kirk, U.S. representative for Illinois's 10th district
- Donald Lowery, former Pope County judge
- Andy Martin, perennial candidate
- Kathleen Thomas, professor

=== Finances ===
Candidate	Cash on hand
Mark Kirk	$2,213,890
Patrick Hughes	$340,048
Don Lowery	$2,077
John Arrington	$1,540
Kathleen Thomas	$1,271
Andy Martin	$0

=== Polling ===
Poll source	Date(s) administered	Mark Kirk	Patrick Hughes	Don Lowery	Kathleen Thomas	John Arrington	Andy Martin	Undecided
Magellan Data (report)	October 8, 2009	61%	3%	2%	1%	1%	—	—
Chicago Tribune (report)	December 2–8, 2009	41%	3%	1%	3%	2%	1%	—
Chicago Tribune (report)	January 16–20, 2010	47%	8%	2%	3%	2%	3%	35%

=== Results ===
Republican primary results by county Kirk: 30–40%; 40–50%; 50–60%; 60–70%; 70–80%; Hughes: 30–40%; Lowery: 20–30%; 30–40%; 40–50%; 50–60%; 60–70%; 70–80%

Republican primary results
Party	Candidate	Votes	%
Republican	Mark Kirk	420,373	56.6
Republican	Patrick Hughes	142,928	19.3
Republican	Donald Lowery	66,357	8.9
Republican	Kathleen Thomas	54,038	7.3
Republican	Andy Martin	37,480	5.0
Republican	John Arrington	21,090	2.8
Republican	Patricia Beard	2	.0003
Total votes		742,268	100.0%

== Green primary ==
=== Candidates ===
- LeAlan Jones, broadcaster, football coach, and lecturer

=== Results ===
Green primary results
Party	Candidate	Votes	%
Green	LeAlan Jones	5,161	100
Total votes		5,161	100%

== General elections ==
=== Candidates ===
- Will Boyd (write-in), Greenville city councilman, pastor and former college dean
- Corey Dabney (write-in)
- Alexi Giannoulias, Illinois treasurer (Democratic)
- LeAlan Jones, broadcaster, football coach, and lecturer (Green)
- Mark Kirk, U.S. representative (Republican)
- Michael Labno, electrical project construction manager (Libertarian)
- Lowell Martin Seida (write-in), Westchester UIC Dragon Boat coach, salvage diver, computerist
- Robert Zadek (write-in) broker

=== Campaign ===
A self-described "fiscal conservative and social moderate," Republican nominee Mark Kirk based his campaign on reform and compared the race to Republican Scott Brown's election to the Senate in February 2010. In addition, Kirk immediately criticized his Democratic opponent for his management of Bright Start, an Illinois 529 college savings program and his work at Broadway Bank. Immediately after the primary, the National Republican Senatorial Committee aired a web ad comparing Giannoulias to the fictional character Tony Soprano. Politifact ranked Kirk's references to the mob as "Half True". Republican U.S. Senator Scott Brown campaigned for Kirk in Illinois. Kimberly Vertolli, Kirk's ex-wife, signed on as an advisor to Mark Kirk's campaign, but didn't support his more conservative platform.

On February 4, 2010, Democrat Alexi Giannoulias revealed his campaign strategy, saying, "come November, Congressman, your days as a Washington insider are over." On July 19, 2010, Giannoulias announced that he had raised $900,000 in the quarter that ended June 30, compared to $2.3 million raised by Kirk. The Giannoulias campaign also announced that President Obama was scheduled to attend an August 5 fundraiser for his candidate in Chicago.

Kirk and Giannoulias disagreed mostly on fiscal and foreign policy. Kirk voted against Obama's Stimulus package and the Patient Protection and Affordable Care Act. As a Congressman, Kirk originally voted for cap and trade but during the primary campaign announced that if elected a Senator he would vote against it. Giannoulias strongly supported the Patient Protection and Affordable Care Act and Obama's stimulus. Kirk opposed the building of the Park 51 Islamic center near Ground Zero of New York City, while Giannoulias stated that "Americans must stand up for freedom of religion even when it's difficult."

Libertarian nominee Michael Labno was added to the ballot by the Illinois State Board of Elections after gaining ballot access by means of citizen petition. Labno, an electrical project construction manager and recruiter for Private Security Union Local 21 ran on a platform of downsizing or cutting some Federal agencies and reducing taxes and government regulations. He also supported allowing citizens to opt out of Social Security. Labno is pro-life and supports 2nd Amendment rights. In August 2010, Democratic candidate Alexi Giannoulias declared Labno a legitimate challenge from the right for Mark Kirk. Labno responded on his Facebook fan page, saying, "This is very true Alexi, and you should be afraid too."

Labno attended the September 18, 2010 Right Nation rally in Hoffman Estates, Illinois headlined by conservative media figure Glenn Beck. While greeting attendees, Labno noted that Republican candidate Kirk did not attend. On August 27, the Illinois Board of Elections approved the Libertarian Party's petition to include its candidates on the ballot.

=== Predictions ===
Source	Ranking	As of
Cook Political Report	Tossup	October 26, 2010
Rothenberg	Tilt R (flip)	October 22, 2010
RealClearPolitics	Tossup	October 26, 2010
Sabato's Crystal Ball	Lean R (flip)	October 21, 2010
CQ Politics	Tossup	October 26, 2010

=== Debates ===
Kirk and Giannoulias debates (other candidates were not invited):

- October 10: Nationwide audience on Meet the Press on NBC.
- October 19: Sponsored by League of Women Voters on ABC News.

Jones and Labno debate:

- Hosted by WBEZ held in Chicago.

=== Polling ===
Poll source	Date(s) administered	Sample size	Margin of error	Alexi Giannoulias (D)	Mark Kirk (R)	LeAlan Jones (G)	Mike Labno (L)	Other	Undecided
Research 2000 (report)	January 26–28, 2009	600	± 4.0%	38%	30%	—	—	—	32%
Rasmussen Reports (report)	August 11, 2009	500	± 4.5%	38%	41%	—	—	4%	17%
Magellan Data (report)	October 9, 2009	—	± 3.1%	35%	42%	—	—	—	23%
Rasmussen Reports (report)	October 14, 2009	500	± 4.5%	41%	41%	—	—	4%	13%
Rasmussen Reports (report)	December 9, 2009	500	± 4.5%	42%	39%	—	—	3%	15%
Public Policy Polling (report)	January 22–25, 2010	1,062	± 3.0%	42%	34%	—	—	—	24%
Rasmussen Reports (report)	February 3, 2010	500	± 4.5%	40%	46%	—	—	4%	10%
Research 2000 (report)	February 22–24, 2010	600	± 4.0%	43%	36%	—	—	2%	19%
Rasmussen Reports (report)	March 8, 2010	500	± 4.5%	44%	41%	—	—	5%	10%
Public Policy Polling (report)	April 1–5, 2010	591	± 4.0%	33%	37%	—	—	—	30%
Rasmussen Reports (report)	April 5, 2010	500	± 4.5%	37%	41%	—	—	8%	13%
Rasmussen Reports (report)	April 28, 2010	500	± 4.5%	38%	46%	—	—	5%	12%
Research 2000 (report)	May 3–5, 2010	600	± 4.0%	38%	41%	—	—	—	21%
Rasmussen Reports (report)	June 7, 2010	500	± 4.5%	39%	42%	—	—	7%	12%
Public Policy Polling (report)	June 12–13, 2010	552	± 4.2%	31%	30%	14%	—	—	24%
Rasmussen Reports (report)	July 7, 2010	500	± 4.5%	40%	39%	—	—	9%	12%
Rasmussen Reports (report)	July 28, 2010	750	± 4.0%	43%	41%	—	—	6%	10%
Rasmussen Reports (report)	August 11, 2010	750	± 4.0%	40%	40%	—	—	8%	12%
Public Policy Polling (report)	August 14–15, 2010	576	± 4.1%	37%	35%	9%	—	—	19%
Rasmussen Reports (report)	August 23, 2010	750	± 4.0%	42%	40%	—	—	6%	12%
Chicago Tribune ()	September 2, 2010	600	± 4.0%	34%	34%	6%	3%	—	22%
Rasmussen Reports (report)	September 7, 2010	750	± 4.0%	37%	41%	9%	—	5%	9%
Rasmussen Reports (report)	September 21, 2010	750	± 4.0%	41%	44%	4%	—	4%	8%
Public Polling Policy (report)	September 23–26, 2010	470	± 4.5%	36%	40%	8%	3%	—	13%
Chicago Tribune (report)	September 24–28, 2010	600	± 4.0%	38%	36%	5%	3%	—	17%
Suffolk University (report)	September 30 – October 3, 2010	500	± 4.0%	41%	42%	4%	3%	—	10%
Rasmussen Reports (report)	October 4, 2010	750	± 4.0%	41%	45%	4%	—	5%	6%
The Simon Poll/SIU (report)	September 30 – October 10, 2010	1,000	± 3.5%	37%	37%	3%	2%	2%	18%
Rasmussen Reports (report)	October 11, 2010	750	± 4.0%	44%	43%	4%	—	7%	2%
Public Policy Polling (report)	October 14–16, 2010	557	± 4.2%	40%	42%	4%	3%	—	10%
Rasmussen Reports (report)	October 18, 2010	750	± 4.0%	40%	44%	4%	—	8%	5%
Mason-Dixon (report)	October 18–20, 2010	625	± 4.0%	41%	43%	—	—	—	16%
Chicago Tribune/WGN (report)	October 18–22, 2010	700	± 4.0%	41%	44%	5%	4%	—	7%
Fox News/Pulse Opinion Research (report)	October 23, 2010	1,000	± 3.0%	41%	43%	7%	2%	—	7%
Rasmussen Reports (report)	October 26, 2010	750	± 4.0%	42%	46%	5%	—	5%	2%
Public Policy Polling (report)	October 30–31, 2010	814	± 3.4%	42%	46%	5%	3%	3%	7%

=== Fundraising ===
Candidate (party)	Receipts	Disbursements	Cash on hand	Debt
Mark Kirk (R)	$14,349,624	$13,602,888	$826,604	$0
Alexi Giannoulias (D)	$10,017,446	$9,829,642	$115,826	$65,800
Source: Federal Election Commission

=== Results ===
United States Senate special election in Illinois, 2010
Party	Candidate	Votes	%	±%
Republican	Mark Kirk	1,677,729	47.31%	+20.26%
Democratic	Alexi Giannoulias	1,641,486	46.29%	−23.68%
Green	LeAlan Jones	129,571	3.65%	N/A
Libertarian	Michael Labno	95,762	2.70%	+1.35%
Write-in		1,436	0.04%	-0.02%
Total votes		3,545,984	100.00%	
Republican gain from Democratic				

United States Senate election in Illinois, 2010
Party	Candidate	Votes	%	±%
Republican	Mark Kirk	1,778,698	48.01%	+0.70%
Democratic	Alexi Giannoulias	1,719,478	46.42%	+0.13%
Green	LeAlan Jones	117,914	3.18%	−0.47%
Libertarian	Michael Labno	87,247	2.36%	−0.34%
Write-in		1,136	0.03%	-0.01%
Total votes		3,704,473	100.00%	
Republican gain from Democratic				

==== Counties that flipped from Democratic to Republican ====
- Bond (largest city: Greenville)
- Bureau (largest city: Princeton)
- Cass (largest city: Beardstown)
- Christian (largest city: Taylorville)
- Clinton (largest city: Breese)
- Coles (largest city: Charleston)
- DeKalb (largest city: DeKalb)
- Fayette (largest city: Vandalia)
- Greene (largest city: Carrollton)
- Grundy (largest city: Morris)
- Hamilton (largest city: McLeansboro)
- Hancock (largest city: Hamilton)
- Hardin (largest city: Rosiclare)
- Jefferson (largest city: Mount Vernon)
- Jersey (largest city: Jerseyville)
- Jo Daviess (largest city: Galena)
- Kankakee (largest city: Kankakee)
- Lawrence (largest city: Lawrenceville)
- Marion (largest city: Centralia)
- Marshall (largest city: Henry)
- Mason (largest city: Havana)
- McDonough (largest city: Macomb)
- Moultrie (largest city: Sullivan)
- Piatt (largest city: Monticello)
- Pike (largest city: Pittsfield)
- Pope (largest city: Golconda)
- Randolph (largest city: Chester)
- Saline (largest city: Harrisburg)
- Schuyler (largest city: Rushville)
- Shelby (largest city: Shelbyville)
- Union (largest city: Anna)
- Vermilion (largest city: Danville)
- Warren (largest city: Monmouth)
- White (largest city: Carmi)
- Will (largest city: Joliet)
- Williamson (largest city: Marion)
- Winnebago (largest city: Rockford)
- Franklin (largest city: West Frankfort)
- Henry (largest city: Kewanee)
- LaSalle (largest city: Ottawa)
- Macon (largest city: Decatur)
- Macoupin (largest city: Carlinville)
- Montgomery (largest city: Litchfield)
- Perry (largest city: Du Quoin)
- Boone (largest city: Belvidere)
- Carroll (largest city: Savanna)
- DuPage (largest city: Aurora)
- Kane (largest city: Aurora)
- Kendall (largest village: Oswego)
- McHenry (largest city: Crystal Lake)
- McLean (largest city: Bloomington)
- Stephenson (largest city: Freeport)
- Adams (largest city: Quincy)
- Brown (largest city: Mount Sterling)
- Cumberland (largest city: Neoga)
- Crawford (largest city: Robinson)
- DeWitt (largest city: Clinton)
- Douglas (largest city: Tuscola)
- Edgar (largest city: Paris)
- Ford (largest city: Paxton)
- Lake (largest city: Waukegan)
- Livingston (largest city: Pontiac)
- Lee (largest city: Dixon)
- Logan (largest city: Lincoln)
- Madison (largest city: Granite City)
- Menard (largest city: Petersburg)
- Mercer (largest city: Aledo)
- Monroe (largest city: Waterloo)
- Morgan (largest city: Jacksonville)
- Ogle (largest city: Rochelle)
- Peoria (largest city: Peoria)
- Putnam (largest city: Hennpin)
- Sangamon (largest city: Springfield)
- Scott (largest city: Winchester)
- Tazewell (largest city: Pekin)
- Washington (largest city: Nashville)
- Calhoun (largest village: Hardin)
- Fulton (largest city: Canton)
- Gallatin (largest city: Shawneetown)
- Henderson (largest village: Oquawka)
- Knox (largest city: Galesburg)
- Pulaski (largest city: Mounds)
- Champaign (largest city: Champaign)
- Rock Island (largest city: Moline)
- Whiteside (largest city: Sterling)
- Woodford (largest city: Eureka)
- Johnson (largest city: Vienna)
