= 2016 United States Senate election in Illinois =

- November 8, 2016
- Turnout: 68.39%
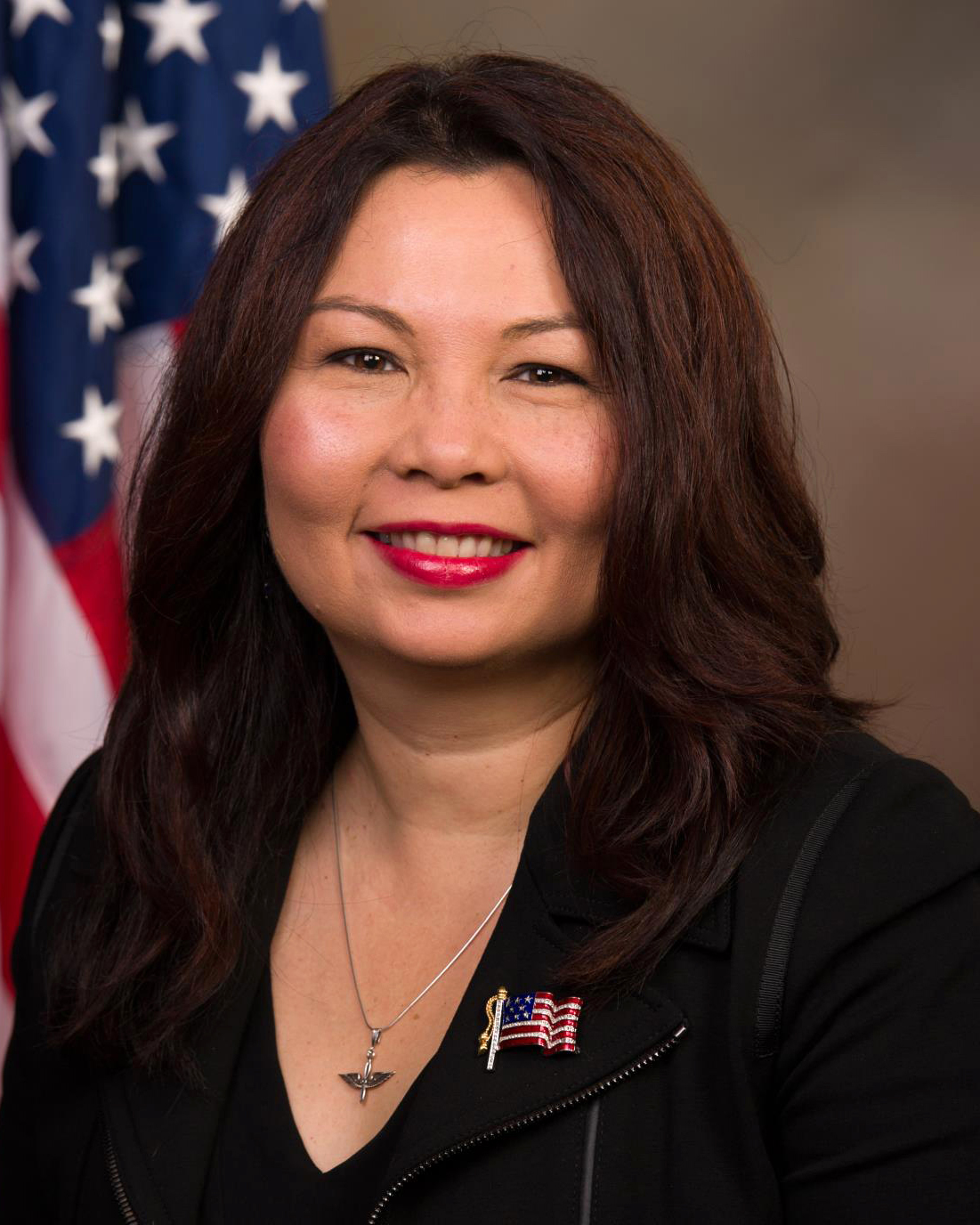

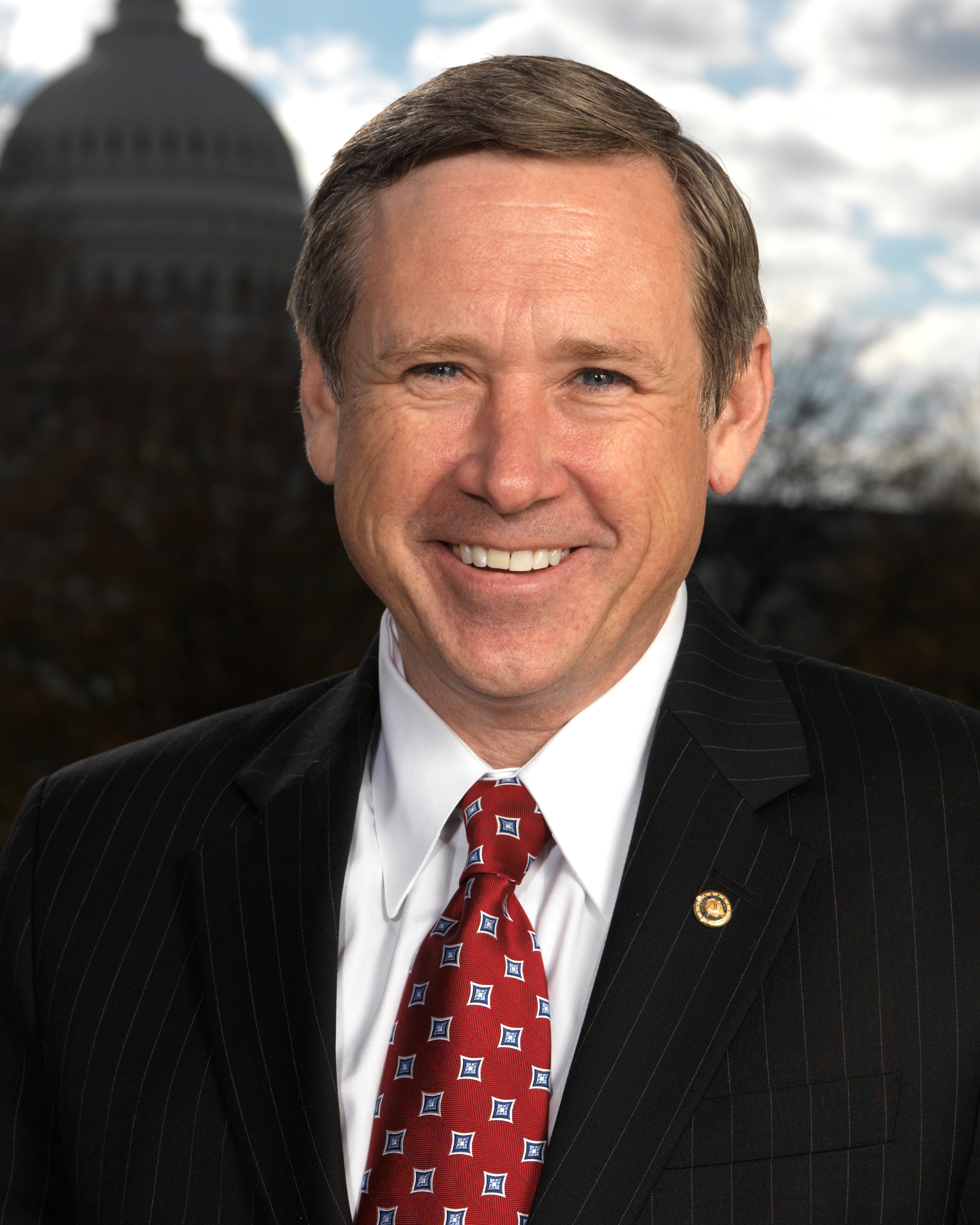
Nominee	Tammy Duckworth	Mark Kirk
Party	Democratic	Republican
Popular vote	3,012,940	2,184,693
Percentage	54.86%	39.78%
- Duckworth: 40–50% 50–60% 60–70% 70–80% 80–90% >90% Kirk: 40–50% 50–60% 60–70% 70–80% 80–90% Tie: 40–50% 50% No data
U.S. senator before election
Mark Kirk
Republican
Elected U.S. Senator
Tammy Duckworth
Democratic

The 2016 United States Senate election in Illinois was held on November 8, 2016, to elect a member of the United States Senate to represent the State of Illinois, concurrently with the 2016 U.S. presidential election, as well as other elections to the United States Senate in other states, elections to the United States House of Representatives, and various state and local elections.

Prior to the election, incumbent senator Mark Kirk (R) was considered to be the most vulnerable senator among those seeking re-election in 2016 due to Illinois's heavy Democratic partisan balance; news networks and analysts widely expected a Democratic pickup.

Party primary elections were held on March 15, 2016. Kirk lost re-election to a second full term to Tammy Duckworth, the U.S. representative from Illinois's 8th congressional district and a decorated combat veteran of the Iraq War. Duckworth became the first woman elected to the U.S. Senate from Illinois since fellow Democrat Carol Moseley Braun in 1992. Despite his loss, Kirk outperformed Trump in the concurrent presidential election by around 2 percentage points. This is the last time a senator from Illinois lost re-election.

== Background ==
In 2010, Republican Mark Kirk was elected to the Senate for Illinois, defeating Democratic nominee Alexi Giannoulias by 59,220 votes out of more than 3.7 million votes cast.

Kirk suffered a severe stroke in January 2012 that kept him away from the Senate until January 2013. In June 2013 he confirmed that he was "planning" to run for re-election, but there was speculation that he might retire, particularly in the wake of the departure of several of his senior staff. Republican Bruce Rauner was elected governor in 2014, and a possible scenario was that Kirk would resign early, allowing Rauner to appoint another Republican as the replacement. Potential replacements included U.S. representatives Bob Dold, Adam Kinzinger, Aaron Schock, and Peter Roskam, State Senators Jason Barickman and Christine Radogno, hedge fund manager and founder and CEO of Citadel LLC Kenneth C. Griffin, and businesswoman Beth Christie. In November 2014, Kirk reiterated that he was going to run for re-election.

Kirk was identified by The Washington Post, The New York Times, Politico, The Huffington Post, Slate and Roll Call as one of the most vulnerable Republican senators up for re-election in 2016.

=== Turnout ===
For the primary election, turnout was 41.94%, with 3,215,334 votes cast. For the general election, turnout was 68.39%, with 5,491,878 votes cast.

== Republican primary ==
=== Candidates ===
==== Nominee ====
- Mark Kirk, incumbent U.S. senator

==== Eliminated in primary ====
- James Marter, businessman

==== Removed from ballot ====
- Elizabeth Pahlke, independent candidate for IL-02 in 2013

==== Withdrawn ====
- Ron Wallace, investment advisor, conservative activist and economics professor

==== Declined ====
- William J. Kelly, television producer, nominee for IL-01 in 1994, candidate for Illinois Comptroller in 2010 and candidate for Mayor of Chicago in 2015
- Bobby Schilling, former U.S. representative
- Joe Walsh, conservative radio talk show host and former U.S. representative

=== Endorsements ===
Mark Kirk

State politicians

- John Bolton, former United States Ambassador to the United Nations

Newspapers

- Chicago Tribune (for primary)
James Marter

Individuals

- Dick Conklin, Knox County Board member
- Mark Curran, Lake County sheriff
- Trent Franks, U.S. representative (AZ-08)
- Patrick Harlan, president of the Knox County Tea Party and candidate for IL-17 in 2016

Organizations

- ALIPAC (Americans for Legal Immigration PAC)
- Chicago 11th Ward Republican Party

=== Polling ===
Poll source	Date(s) administered	Sample size	Margin of error	Mark Kirk	James Marter	Undecided
Chicago Tribune	March 2–6, 2016	600	± 4.1%	65%	22%	12%
SIU Simon Institute	February 15–20, 2016	306	± 5.6%	53%	14%	33%

=== Results ===
Results by county Kirk—70–80% Kirk—60–70% Kirk—50–60%

Republican primary results
Party	Candidate	Votes	%
Republican	Mark Kirk (incumbent)	931,619	70.6
Republican	James T. Marter	388,571	29.4
Total votes		1,320,190	100.0

== Democratic primary ==
=== Candidates ===
==== Nominee ====
- Tammy Duckworth, U.S. representative

==== Eliminated in primary ====
- Napoleon Harris, state senator and candidate for Illinois's 2nd congressional district in 2013
- Andrea Zopp, former president and CEO of the Chicago Urban League, former Chicago Board of Education member

==== Withdrawn ====
- Tio Hardiman, former director of CeaseFire and candidate for governor in 2014 (ran for IL-01, then withdrew to run for Cook County clerk of court)
- Robert Marshall, radiologist and perennial candidate (running for IL-06)

==== Declined ====
- Daniel Biss, state senator (running for state comptroller)
- Richard Boykin, Cook County Commissioner
- Cheri Bustos, U.S. representative
- Jacqueline Y. Collins, state senator
- Tom Dart, sheriff of Cook County
- Bill Foster, U.S. representative
- Mike Frerichs, Illinois Treasurer
- Daniel Hynes, former Illinois Comptroller, candidate for U.S. Senate in 2004 and candidate for governor of Illinois in 2010
- Robin Kelly, U.S. representative
- Lisa Madigan, Illinois Attorney General
- Michelle Obama, First Lady of the United States
- Mike Quigley, U.S. representative
- Pat Quinn, former governor of Illinois
- Kwame Raoul, state senator
- Jan Schakowsky, U.S. representative
- Sheila Simon, former lieutenant governor of Illinois and nominee for Illinois Comptroller in 2014

=== Endorsements ===
Tammy Duckworth

U.S. cabinet members and cabinet-level officials

- Hillary Clinton, 67th United States Secretary of State, 2008 presidential candidate and 2016 presidential nominee

U.S. senators

- Dick Durbin, Illinois
- Kirsten Gillibrand, New York
- Harry Reid, Nevada
- Jon Tester, Montana
- Elizabeth Warren, Massachusetts

U.S. representatives

- Bill Foster, Illinois
- Jan Schakowsky, Illinois

Labor unions

- AFL–CIO
- IFT - Illinois Federation of Teachers

Organizations

- Democratic Senatorial Campaign Committee
- EMILY's List
- VoteVets.org

Newspapers

- Chicago Tribune
Andrea Zopp

U.S. representatives

- Danny K. Davis, Illinois
- Bobby Rush, Illinois

Notable individuals

- Jesse Jackson, civil rights activist
- Kwame Raoul, state senator
- Kurt Summers, Jr., Chicago city treasurer

Newspapers

- Chicago Defender
- Chicago Sun-Times

=== Polling ===
Poll source	Date(s) administered	Sample size	Margin of error	Tammy Duckworth	Andrea Zopp	Napoleon Harris	Undecided
SIU Simon Institute	February 15–20, 2016	422	± 4.7%	52%	6%	4%	37%
Public Policy Polling	July 20–21, 2015	409	± 4.9%	59%	10%	—	31%

=== Results ===
Results by county Duckworth—80–90% Duckworth—70–80% Duckworth—60–70% Duckworth—50–60%

Democratic primary results
Party	Candidate	Votes	%
Democratic	Tammy Duckworth	1,220,128	64.38%
Democratic	Andrea Zopp	455,729	24.05%
Democratic	Napoleon Harris	219,286	11.57%
Total votes		1,859,257	100.00%

== Third party candidates ==
On July 6, the Green Party candidate and the Libertarian Party candidate were announced as having made the ballot for November after no objections were filed against their petitions. However, objections against two others were filed, namely the Constitution Party candidate Chad Koppie, due to his name being on a petition slate with Constitution Party presidential candidate Darrell Castle, who turned in fewer than the required petitions needed, and against Independent candidate Eric Conklin. Neither Koppie nor Conklin were likely to receive ballot access after a review of their petitions.

=== Constitution Party (C) (write-in) ===
- Chad Koppie, farmer and vice president of Kane County Regional Board of School Trustees

=== Libertarian Party (L) ===
- Kent McMillen

=== Green Party (G) ===
- Scott Summers, attorney and former member of the McHenry County College Board of Trustees

=== Independent (I) ===
- Eric M. Conklin, law enforcement officer

== General election ==
- Tammy Duckworth (D), U.S. representative
- Mark Kirk (R), incumbent U.S. senator
- Chad Koppie (C) (write-in)
- Kenton McMillen (L)
- Scott Summers (G)

=== Debates ===
Dates	Location	Kirk	Duckworth	Link
October 3, 2016	Chicago, Illinois	Participant	Participant	
October 27, 2016	Springfield, Illinois	Participant	Participant	
November 4, 2016	Chicago, Illinois	Participant	Participant	

=== Campaign ===
Kirk had multiple factors working against him, as no Republican had won an Illinois US Senate race during a presidential election year since 1972, and he had made a number of gaffes during the campaign. He had exaggerated his Iraq War record on his campaign website, and during a debate, Kirk made a racially charged remark about Duckworth's familial military background. Additionally, Republican presidential nominee Donald Trump was unpopular in Chicago and its suburbs, and Kirk refused to endorse or vote for him, instead writing in former U.S. Secretary of State Colin Powell. Kirk also had a mostly liberal voting record in the Senate, favoring gay marriage, an assault weapons ban, and he had voted against defunding and repealing portions of Obamacare in 2015. Due to these factors, Kirk alienated the Democratic, Independent, and Republican voters whom he had previously won over in his 2010 campaign. Unusually, the normally Republican-leaning editorial board of the Chicago Tribune endorsed Duckworth, as they believed that the health problems that Kirk had suffered as a result of his stroke made him a less effective senator. This election had been cited as historic, as both major party nominees had physical disabilities.

=== Endorsements ===
Mark Kirk (R)

Governors

- John Kasich, governor of Ohio and 2016 presidential candidate
- Bruce Rauner, governor of Illinois
- Mitt Romney, former governor of Massachusetts and 2012 Republican presidential nominee

U.S. representatives

- Mike Bost, Illinois
- Rodney Davis, Illinois
- Bob Dold, Illinois
- Randy Hultgren, Illinois
- Adam Kinzinger, Illinois
- Darin Lahood, Illinois
- Peter Roskam, Illinois
- John Shimkus, Illinois

U.S. senators

- Shelley Moore Capito, United States senator from West Virginia
- John Cornyn, United States senator from Texas
- Joni Ernst, United States senator from Iowa
- John McCain, United States senator from Arizona, 2000 presidential candidate and 2008 presidential nominee
- Mitch McConnell, United States senator from Kentucky and Senate Majority Leader
- Marco Rubio, United States senator from Florida and 2016 presidential candidate

State Representatives

- Mark Batinick, Illinois
- Tom Bennett, Illinois
- Adam Brown, Illinois
- Dwight Kay, Illinois
- Michael McAuliffe, Illinois
- David McSweeney, Illinois
- Ron Sandack, Illinois
- Brian W. Stewart, Illinois
- Mike Unes, Illinois
- Grant Wehrli, Illinois
- Christine Winger, Illinois

State officials

- Evelyn Sanguinetti, lieutenant governor of Illinois

Mayors

- Jim Ardis, mayor of Peoria, Illinois

Individuals

- John R. Bolton, former United States Ambassador to the United Nations
- Gabby Giffords, former United States House of Representatives member for Arizona's 8th congressional district (Democratic)
- Jim Lovell, former NASA astronaut, retired United States Navy captain and commander of the Apollo 13

Newspapers

- The Daily Herald
- Herald-Whig
- Journal Star
- The News-Gazette
- Northwest Herald

Organizations

- Americans for Responsible Solutions
- Humane Society Legislative Fund
Tammy Duckworth (D)

U.S. presidents

- Barack Obama, 44th president of the United States

U.S. vice presidents

- Joe Biden, 47th vice president of the United States

U.S. cabinet members and cabinet-level officials

- Hillary Clinton, 67th United States Secretary of State, 2008 presidential candidate and 2016 presidential nominee

U.S. senators

- Dick Durbin, Illinois
- Kirsten Gillibrand, New York
- Harry Reid, Nevada
- Jon Tester, Montana
- Elizabeth Warren, Massachusetts

U.S. representatives

- Bill Foster, Illinois
- Jan Schakowsky, Illinois

Labor unions

- AFL–CIO
- IFT - Illinois Federation of Teachers

Newspapers

- Chicago Tribune

Organizations

- Democratic Senatorial Campaign Committee
- EMILY's List
- Human Rights Campaign (endorsed Kirk until October 29)
- VoteVets.org

=== Predictions ===
Source	Ranking	As of
The Cook Political Report	Lean D (flip)	November 2, 2016
Inside Elections	Lean D (flip)	November 3, 2016
Sabato's Crystal Ball	Likely D (flip)	November 7, 2016
Daily Kos	Safe D (flip)	November 8, 2016
Real Clear Politics	Likely D (flip)	November 7, 2016

=== Polling ===
View source data.

Poll source	Date(s) administered	Sample size	Margin of error	Mark Kirk (R)	Tammy Duckworth (D)	Other	Undecided
SurveyMonkey	November 1–7, 2016	1,823	± 4.6%	39%	56%	—	5%
SurveyMonkey	October 31 – November 6, 2016	1,505	± 4.6%	39%	56%	—	5%
SurveyMonkey	October 28 – November 3, 2016	1,120	± 4.6%	40%	54%	—	6%
SurveyMonkey	October 27 – November 2, 2016	997	± 4.6%	40%	55%	—	5%
SurveyMonkey	October 26 – November 1, 2016	911	± 4.6%	39%	55%	—	6%
SurveyMonkey	October 25–31, 2016	1,003	± 4.6%	38%	57%	—	5%
Emerson College	October 27–30, 2016	500	± 4.3%	36%	54%	5%	5%
Loras College	October 26–27, 2016	600	± 4.0%	34%	42%	6%	18%
The Illinois Poll - Victory Research	October 16–18, 2016	1,200	± 2.8%	39%	50%	3%	8%
GS Strategy Group (R-Kirk)	October 4–5, 2016	600	± 4.0%	37%	41%	6%	16%
Southern Illinois University	Sept 27–Oct 2, 2016	865	± 3.3%	34%	48%	8%	10%
Normington, Petts and Associates (D)	September 27–29, 2016	600	± 4.0%	37%	46%	—	17%
Emerson College	September 19–20, 2016	700	± 3.6%	39%	41%	11%	9%
Loras College	September 13–16, 2016	600	± 4.0%	36%	41%	—	22%
Normington, Petts and Associates (D)	August 1–4, 2016	800	± 3.5%	37%	44%	—	19%
The Illinois Poll - Victory Research	July 14–16, 2016	1,200	± 2.8%	37%	46%	4%	12%
Normington, Petts and Associates (D)	July 11–14, 2016	800	± 3.5%	38%	40%	—	22%
Basswood Research (R)	July 11–12, 2016	800	± 3.5%	42%	40%	—	18%
GS Strategy Group (R-Kirk)	March 30–31, 2016	600	± 4.0%	40%	43%	—	17%
End Citizens United	September 10–14, 2015	948	± 3.2%	41%	45%	—	14%
Public Policy Polling	July 20–21, 2015	931	± 3.2%	36%	42%	—	22%
Ogden & Fry	June 23, 2015	598	± 4.1%	27%	44%	—	29%
We Ask America	December 18, 2014	1,003	± 3.0%	45%	46%	—	9%

Hypothetical polling

with Andrea Zopp

Poll source	Date(s) administered	Sample size	Margin of error	Mark Kirk (R)	Andrea Zopp (D)	Other	Undecided
Public Policy Polling	July 20–21, 2015	931	± 3.2%	38%	29%	—	32%

with Lisa Madigan

Poll source	Date(s) administered	Sample size	Margin of error	Mark Kirk (R)	Lisa Madigan (D)	Undecided
Public Policy Polling	November 22–25, 2013	557	± 4.2%	41%	41%	19%

with Michelle Obama

Poll source	Date(s) administered	Sample size	Margin of error	Mark Kirk (R)	Michelle Obama (D)	Undecided
Gravis Marketing	March 21–22, 2014	806	± 3.0%	47%	42%	11%
Public Policy Polling	November 26–28, 2012	500	± 4.4%	40%	51%	9%

with Pat Quinn

Poll source	Date(s) administered	Sample size	Margin of error	Mark Kirk (R)	Pat Quinn (D)	Undecided
We Ask America	December 18, 2014	1,003	± 3.0%	55%	36%	9%

=== Results ===
The result was a landslide victory for Tammy Duckworth. Pre-election polling showed Kirk would be easily defeated by Duckworth, and the polls were proven right when Duckworth was declared the winner quickly after polls closed in Illinois. Duckworth performed extremely well in the heavily populated and strongly Democratic Cook County, home of Chicago. Duckworth also did well in Champaign, East St. Louis and Carbondale. Kirk did do well in rural parts of the state, but it was nowhere near enough to offset his weakness in the Chicago metropolitan area. The Chicago 'collar counties' — among them Kirk's home county of Lake County — previously voted for Kirk, but easily flipped to Duckworth. Duckworth was sworn in at 12:00 P.M. EST on January 3, 2017. The Libertarian and Green candidates polled well, winning three and two percent of the vote respectively.

United States Senate election in Illinois, 2016
Party	Candidate	Votes	%	±%
Democratic	Tammy Duckworth	3,012,940	54.86%	+8.44%
Republican	Mark Kirk (incumbent)	2,184,692	39.78%	−8.23%
Libertarian	Kenton McMillen	175,988	3.21%	+0.85%
Green	Scott Summers	117,619	2.14%	−1.04%
Write-in		639	0.01%	-0.02%
Total votes		5,491,878	100.00%	N/A
Democratic gain from Republican				

==== Results by county ====
County	Tammy Duckworth Democratic		Mark Kirk Republican		Various Candidates Other Parties		Margin		Total
County	#	%	#	%	#	%	#	%	Total
Adams	12,391	39.05%	18,094	57.02%	1,247	3.93%	-5,703	-17.97%	31,732
Alexander	1,511	55.49%	1,121	41.17%	91	3.35%	390	14.32%	2,723
Bond	3,203	43.00%	3,841	51.56%	405	5.44%	-638	-8.56%	7,449
Boone	8,509	37.69%	12,520	55.45%	1,550	6.86%	-4,011	-17.76%	22,579
Brown	794	34.95%	1,380	60.74%	98	4.31%	-586	-25.79%	2,272
Bureau	6,842	42.17%	8,434	51.98%	948	5.85%	-1,592	-9.81%	16,224
Calhoun	1,272	51.37%	1,131	45.68%	73	2.95%	141	5.69%	2,476
Carroll	2,577	35.18%	4,354	59.43%	395	5.39%	-1,777	-24.25%	7,326
Cass	1,799	35.83%	2,917	58.10%	305	6.08%	-1,118	-22.27%	5,021
Champaign	45,760	51.00%	38,731	43.17%	5,228	5.83%	7,029	7.83%	89,719
Christian	4,876	32.12%	9,316	61.36%	990	6.53%	-4,440	-29.24%	15,182
Clark	2,394	30.94%	4,953	64.02%	390	5.04%	-2,559	-33.08%	7,737
Clay	1,917	31.41%	3,905	63.98%	281	4.60%	-1,988	-32.57%	6,103
Clinton	6,419	37.39%	10,049	58.54%	698	4.06%	-3,630	-21.15%	17,166
Coles	7,516	35.04%	12,555	58.54%	1,376	6.42%	-5,039	-23.50%	21,447
Cook	1,499,900	70.40%	529,781	24.87%	100,877	4.74%	970,119	45.53%	2,130,558
Crawford	2,648	31.01%	5,455	63.88%	437	5.11%	-2,807	-32.87%	8,540
Cumberland	1,329	24.16%	3,797	69.02%	375	6.82%	-2,468	-44.86%	5,501
DeKalb	20,025	46.80%	19,355	45.24%	3,404	7.95%	670	1.56%	42,784
DeWitt	1,943	26.02%	5,009	67.09%	514	6.88%	-3,066	-41.07%	7,466
Douglas	1,972	24.43%	5,599	69.36%	501	6.21%	-3,627	-44.93%	8,072
DuPage	208,669	49.11%	193,069	45.44%	23,142	5.45%	15,600	3.67%	424,880
Edgar	2,027	26.19%	5,290	68.36%	422	5.45%	-3,263	-42.17%	7,739
Edwards	727	22.83%	2,322	72.93%	135	4.24%	-1,595	-50.10%	3,184
Effingham	3,810	22.06%	12,520	72.48%	943	5.46%	-8,710	-50.42%	17,273
Fayette	3,201	34.11%	5,751	61.29%	431	4.60%	-2,550	-27.18%	9,383
Ford	1,421	22.46%	4,507	71.22%	400	6.32%	-3,086	-48.76%	6,328
Franklin	8,537	46.59%	8,894	48.54%	893	4.88%	-357	-1.95%	18,324
Fulton	6,726	43.13%	7,702	49.39%	1,167	7.48%	-976	-6.26%	15,595
Gallatin	1,263	49.39%	1,209	47.28%	85	3.32%	54	2.11%	2,557
Greene	2,023	37.41%	3,064	56.67%	320	5.92%	-1,041	-19.26%	5,407
Grundy	9,475	41.52%	11,624	50.94%	1,721	7.55%	-2,149	-9.42%	22,820
Hamilton	1,628	41.09%	2,171	54.80%	163	4.11%	-543	-13.71%	3,962
Hancock	3,394	38.02%	5,127	57.44%	405	4.54%	-1,733	-19.42%	8,926
Hardin	865	41.81%	1,137	54.95%	67	3.23%	-272	-13.14%	2,069
Henderson	1,407	41.07%	1,820	53.12%	199	5.81%	-413	-12.05%	3,426
Henry	9,488	39.49%	13,214	54.99%	1,326	5.53%	-3,726	-15.50%	24,028
Iroquois	2,755	21.36%	9,379	72.73%	762	5.90%	-6,624	-51.37%	12,896
Jackson	13,739	56.92%	8,938	37.03%	1,461	6.05%	4,801	19.89%	24,138
Jasper	1,420	28.71%	3,312	66.96%	214	4.33%	-1,892	-38.25%	4,946
Jefferson	6,903	41.62%	8,790	53.00%	893	5.38%	-1,887	-11.38%	16,586
Jersey	4,233	39.79%	5,840	54.90%	565	5.32%	-1,607	-15.11%	10,638
Jo Daviess	4,525	40.75%	5,988	53.93%	590	5.31%	-1,463	-13.18%	11,103
Johnson	2,056	34.63%	3,572	60.17%	309	5.20%	-1,516	-25.54%	5,937
Kane	97,088	49.11%	87,886	44.46%	12,707	6.43%	9,202	4.65%	197,681
Kankakee	20,901	44.92%	22,850	49.11%	2,779	5.98%	-1,949	-4.19%	46,530
Kendall	24,035	45.28%	25,202	47.48%	3,840	7.23%	-1,167	-2.20%	53,077
Knox	10,651	47.97%	10,350	46.61%	1,203	5.41%	301	1.36%	22,204
Lake	150,351	50.11%	135,334	45.10%	14,369	4.79%	15,017	5.01%	300,054
LaSalle	22,073	45.46%	23,471	48.34%	3,015	6.20%	-1,398	-2.88%	48,559
Lawrence	1,938	32.93%	3,701	62.88%	247	4.20%	-1,763	-29.95%	5,886
Lee	5,587	36.62%	8,640	56.63%	1,031	6.76%	-3,053	-20.01%	15,258
Livingston	4,019	26.54%	10,169	67.16%	954	6.30%	-6,150	-40.62%	15,142
Logan	3,272	26.75%	8,236	67.34%	723	5.91%	-4,964	-40.59%	12,231
Macon	18,600	39.28%	26,114	55.15%	2,634	5.56%	-7,514	-15.87%	47,348
Macoupin	10,264	46.87%	10,550	48.18%	1,083	4.94%	-286	-1.31%	21,897
Madison	64,240	50.37%	56,665	44.43%	6,624	5.19%	7,575	5.94%	127,529
Marion	6,827	40.85%	9,162	54.83%	722	4.32%	-2,335	-13.98%	16,711
Marshall	1,921	32.59%	3,588	60.88%	385	6.54%	-1,667	-28.29%	5,894
Mason	2,301	36.00%	3,708	58.02%	382	5.98%	-1,407	-22.02%	6,391
Massac	2,461	37.68%	3,739	57.25%	331	5.07%	-1,278	-19.57%	6,531
McDonough	6,254	48.48%	5,917	45.87%	729	5.65%	337	2.61%	12,900
McHenry	58,815	41.54%	72,296	51.06%	10,492	7.41%	-13,481	-9.52%	141,603
McLean	33,204	41.43%	41,579	51.88%	5,358	6.68%	-8,375	-10.45%	80,141
Menard	1,773	27.68%	4,278	66.79%	354	5.52%	-2,505	-39.11%	6,405
Mercer	3,391	40.67%	4,465	53.56%	481	5.77%	-1,074	-12.89%	8,337
Monroe	7,458	39.12%	10,885	57.10%	719	3.77%	-3,427	-17.98%	19,062
Montgomery	5,367	42.33%	6,662	52.54%	651	5.13%	-1,295	-10.21%	12,680
Morgan	4,733	32.34%	9,112	62.27%	789	5.39%	-4,379	-29.93%	14,634
Moultrie	1,574	25.40%	4,264	68.82%	358	5.78%	-2,690	-43.42%	6,196
Ogle	7,645	32.00%	14,768	61.82%	1,477	6.17%	-7,123	-29.82%	23,890
Peoria	36,548	46.07%	38,169	48.12%	4,606	5.81%	-1,621	-2.05%	79,323
Perry	4,279	44.33%	4,925	51.03%	448	4.64%	-646	-6.70%	9,652
Piatt	2,563	28.52%	5,954	66.24%	471	5.24%	-3,391	-37.72%	8,988
Pike	2,654	36.02%	4,377	59.41%	337	4.58%	-1,723	-23.39%	7,368
Pope	703	34.03%	1,279	61.91%	84	4.06%	-576	-27.88%	2,066
Pulaski	1,394	52.11%	1,206	45.08%	75	2.81%	188	7.03%	2,675
Putnam	1,255	41.68%	1,587	52.71%	169	5.61%	-332	-11.03%	3,011
Randolph	6,119	43.75%	7,364	52.65%	504	3.60%	-1,245	-8.90%	13,987
Richland	2,208	29.60%	4,900	65.68%	352	4.71%	-2,692	-36.08%	7,460
Rock Island	32,952	52.39%	26,767	42.55%	3,184	5.06%	6,185	9.84%	62,903
Saline	4,797	44.22%	5,612	51.73%	439	4.04%	-815	-7.51%	10,848
Sangamon	39,928	41.08%	51,849	53.35%	5,416	5.58%	-11,921	-12.27%	97,193
Schuyler	1,612	43.01%	1,943	51.84%	193	5.16%	-331	-8.83%	3,748
Scott	848	33.11%	1,606	62.71%	107	4.17%	-758	-29.60%	2,561
Shelby	2,733	25.18%	7,418	68.34%	704	6.48%	-4,685	-43.16%	10,855
St. Clair	68,709	57.25%	45,998	38.32%	5,314	4.43%	22,711	18.93%	120,021
Stark	782	28.93%	1,760	65.11%	161	5.95%	-978	-36.18%	2,703
Stephenson	7,411	36.86%	11,453	56.97%	1,240	6.16%	-4,042	-20.11%	20,104
Tazewell	21,215	33.11%	38,386	59.91%	4,474	6.98%	-17,171	-26.80%	64,075
Union	3,843	45.56%	4,231	50.16%	361	4.28%	-388	-4.60%	8,435
Vermilion	10,511	34.56%	18,076	59.44%	1,826	6.00%	-7,565	-24.88%	30,413
Wabash	1,541	29.24%	3,500	66.41%	229	4.35%	-1,959	-37.17%	5,270
Warren	3,025	39.21%	4,184	54.24%	505	6.55%	-1,159	-15.03%	7,714
Washington	2,553	35.16%	4,417	60.83%	291	4.01%	-1,864	-25.67%	7,261
Wayne	1,924	24.22%	5,616	70.69%	404	5.08%	-3,692	-46.47%	7,944
White	2,408	33.98%	4,356	61.46%	323	4.56%	-1,948	-27.48%	7,087
Whiteside	11,672	46.33%	12,149	48.22%	1,372	5.44%	-477	-1.89%	25,193
Will	152,790	51.08%	127,473	42.61%	18,870	6.31%	25,317	8.47%	299,133
Williamson	13,518	43.42%	16,075	51.63%	1,543	4.95%	-2,557	-8.21%	31,136
Winnebago	52,730	44.62%	57,643	48.78%	7,797	6.60%	-4,913	-4.16%	118,170
Woodford	5,083	25.95%	13,291	67.85%	1,214	6.20%	-8,208	-41.90%	19,588
Total	3,012,940	54.86%	2,184,692	39.78%	294,246	5.36%	828,248	15.08%	5,491,878

==== Counties that flipped from Republican to Democratic ====
- DeKalb (largest city: DeKalb)
- DuPage (largest city: Aurora)
- Gallatin (largest city: Shawneetown)
- Kane (largest city: Aurora)
- Lake (largest city: Waukegan)
- McDonough (largest city: Macomb)
- Will (largest city: Joliet)
- Calhoun (largest village: Hardin)
- Madison (largest city: Granite City)
- Knox (largest city: Galesburg)
- Champaign (largest city: Champaign)
- Rock Island (largest city: Moline)

==== By congressional district ====
Duckworth won 12 of 18 districts, including one that elected a Republican.

District	Kirk	Duckworth	Representative
1st	21%	74%	Bobby Rush
2nd	19%	77%	Robin Kelly
3rd	38%	56%	Dan Lipinski
4th	16%	77%	Luis Gutierrez
5th	31%	64%	Mike Quigley
6th	50%	44%	Peter Roskam
7th	15%	82%	Danny K. Davis
8th	38%	56%	Tammy Duckworth
8th	38%	56%	Raja Krishnamoorthi
9th	33%	63%	Jan Schakowsky
10th	42%	53%	Robert Dold
10th	42%	53%	Brad Schneider
11th	37%	57%	Bill Foster
12th	43%	52%	Mike Bost
13th	47.2%	46.9%	Rodney Davis
14th	51%	42%	Randy Hultgren
15th	62%	33%	John Shimkus
16th	54%	39%	Adam Kinzinger
17th	46%	48%	Cheri Bustos
18th	59%	35%	Darin LaHood
