= Broadway Bank (Illinois) =

American bank (1979–2010)

Broadway Bank was a Chicago bank that existed from 1979 to 2010, and was owned by the Giannoulias family.

It was founded in 1979 by Alexis Giannoulias, a Greek immigrant. His sons, Demetris Giannoulias and Alexi Giannoulias, were also heavily involved in the bank. Demetris eventually became a senior officer, and Alexi was a vice president and senior loan officer from 2002 to 2006. By 2010, Demetris was CEO. Its financial situation and history of questionable loans were a factor in the campaign of Alexi Giannoulias in the 2010 U.S. Senate election in Illinois.

== 21st century ==
In 2002, Broadway Bank made a one million dollar loan to Loren Billings, using her building on West Washington Street in Chicago as collateral; the building was both her home and the Museum of Holography, which she had founded in the 1970s. In 2006, her son sued the bank, claiming that she had dementia; the bank won the suit in Cook County court in 2008 but, as of December 2009, the case was being pursued by the son in appellate court.

Among people with bank accounts at Broadway were Barack Obama, Illinois Secretary of State Jesse White, and Chicago alderman Walter Burnett, Jr.

In 2006, Broadway Bank was considered very successful, and less than 0.5% of its loan portfolio was 90 days overdue.

Alexi Giannoulias left Broadway Bank in 2006 when he was elected Illinois State Treasurer. While state treasurer, he won the Democratic primary in the 2010 U.S. Senate election in Illinois, making him the Democratic candidate for Barack Obama's former U.S. Senate seat.

== Collapse ==
By 2009, Broadway Bank had become burdened with bad loans. On January 26, 2010, the bank agreed to restrictions from state and federal banking regulators: ending dividend payments to the Giannoulias family without regulatory approval, hiring outsiders to evaluate the senior management, adding $19 million to its reserves, raising another $50 million within 90 days to achieve its promised capital ratio, and adopting a less risky investment strategy. CFO Kaushik Pancholi, noting that Broadway has previously "been one of the most profitable banks in Illinois", noted "certain investments that were rated triple-A by rating agencies when purchased, but have lost significant value over the past year." At the end of business on Friday, April 23, 2010, the Illinois Department of Financial and Professional Regulation, Division of Banking, seized Broadway Bank and appointed the Federal Deposit Insurance Corporation (FDIC) as receiver. The FDIC in turn named MB Financial Bank as the institution receiving Broadway Bank's deposit accounts. The FDIC announced that it and MB Financial Bank would share $878.4 million in losses, for a cost of $394.3 million to the federal Deposit Insurance Fund. Broadway Bank was one of seven Illinois banks that were closed on the same day; the others were Chicago banks Citizens Bank & Trust Co., Lincoln Park Savings Bank, and New Century Bank; Amcore Bank in Rockford; Peotone Bank and Trust Co.; and Wheatland Bank in Naperville.

== See also ==
- Alexi Giannoulias#Broadway Bank — details about Alexi Giannoulias' involvement in the bank
- United States Senate election in Illinois, 2010
