= Cheryle Robinson Jackson =

American business executive (born 1965)

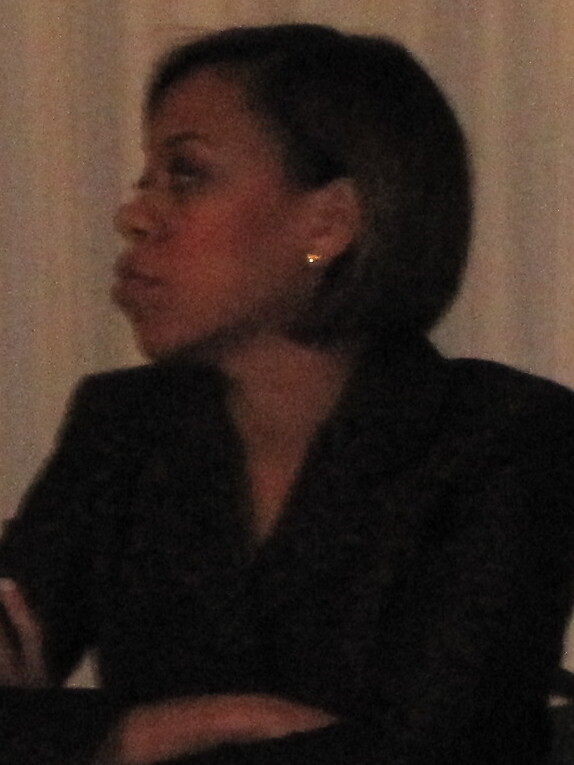
- Born: Cheryle Robinson; July 20, 1965 (age 61); Chicago, Illinois, U.S.
- Occupations: President and CEO, Chicago Urban League
- Spouse: Charles Jackson (m. 1995–2013)
- Website: http://www.cheryle2010.com/

Cheryle Robinson-Jackson (born Cheryle Robinson; July 20, 1965) is an American who was appointed in October 2006 to be the first female president and CEO in the 90-year history of the Chicago Urban League.

== Career ==
Prior to her appointment, Jackson served in the administration of Illinois Gov. Rod R. Blagojevich, most recently as deputy chief of staff of communications and before that as communications director and chief press secretary, making her both the first woman and African American to hold the position in the state's history. After serving in Gov. Blagojevich's administration for 2 1/2 years, Jackson resigned from her post as result of her disapproval of the governor's leadership.

Before joining Gov. Blagojevich's administration, Jackson spent three years in senior-level government affairs positions with Amtrak as vice president for communications and government affairs. She was responsible for Amtrak's state and local government affairs and served as spokesperson in 41 states, often during times of crises, including the 9/11 terrorist attacks.

In addition, she served in various capacities at National Public Radio (NPR), including as vice president of communications and brand management, director of corporate communications and director of corporate identity and information. Among her charges, Jackson served as national spokesperson and oversaw the network's national marketing, advertising and public affairs operations.

Jackson serves as a director on the boards of the Metropolitan Planning Council and the Chicagoland Chamber of Commerce and serves on the Chicago 2016 Olympics Committee and the Daniel Burnham Anniversary Planning Committee.

On August 10, 2009, the Associated Press reported Jackson's intent to run for the U.S. Senate seat then held by Democrat Roland Burris. Jackson officially launched her bid for the U.S. Senate Seat representing Illinois on September 16, 2009. On February 2, 2010, she was defeated for the Democratic Party nomination by Alexi Giannoulias.

== See also ==
- United States Senate elections in Illinois, 2010
