= United States–China Working Group =

The U.S.-China Working Group (USCWG) is a bipartisan working group in the United States House of Representatives. Created in June 2005 by Rep. Mark Kirk and Rep. Rick Larsen, it seeks to "build diplomatic relations with China and educate Members of Congress through meetings and briefings with business, academic and political leaders from the U.S. and China."

== Purpose ==
The purpose of the group is to provide accurate information to members of Congress on critical issues and provide a forum for discussion with Chinese leaders. Membership in the group does not imply taking a position on issues.

== Members (as of 31 May 2026) ==
- Judy Chu CA-27
- James Clyburn SC-06
- Gerry Connolly VA-11
- Debbie Dingell MI-12
- Brian Fitzpatrick PA-01
- Virginia Foxx NC-05
- Sam Graves MO-06
- French Hill AR-02
- Sheila Jackson Lee TX-18
- Hank Johnson GA-04
- Mike Kelly PA-16
- Derek Kilmer WA-06
- Frank Lucas OK-03
- Cathy McMorris Rodgers WA-05
- Dan Meuser PA-09
- Carol Miller WV-03
- Ralph Norman SC-05
- Stacey E. Plaskett VI-At Large
- Mike Quigley IL-05
- Guy Reschenthaler PA-14
- Dutch Ruppersberger MD-02
- Gregorio Sablan MP-At Large
- Linda Sanchez CA-38
- Adam Schiff CA-28
- Bennie Thompson MS-02
- Nydia Velazquez NY-07
- Maxine Waters CA-43

=== Former members ===
- Earl Blumenauer
- Adam Smith
- Jim Cooper
- Bobby Rush
- Gabby Giffords
- Jay Inslee
- Mark Kirk, former co-chair
- Randy Kuhl
- Nancy Johnson
- Chris Cannon
- Mike Rogers
- Carolyn Maloney
- Fred Upton
- Rob Simmons
- Joe Schwartz
- David Wu
- Ed Case
- Sherwood Boehlert
- Heather Wilson
- Charlie Bass
- Mark Kennedy
- Charles Boustany
- Donald Manzullo
- Roscoe Bartlett
- Phil Gingrey
- Charlie Dent
- Dan Burton
- Todd Platts
- Mike Conaway
- Geoff Davis
- Chip Cravaack
- Denny Rehberg
- Randy Neugebauer
- Aaron Schock
- Todd Young
- Peter Roskam
- Michele Bachmann
- Dave Reichert
- Brian Bilbray
- Tom Price
- Erik Paulsen
- Leonard Lance
- Robert Dold
- Steve Israel
- Joseph Crowley
- Madeleine Bordallo
- Rush Holt Jr.
- Colleen Hanabusa
- Loretta Sanchez
- Mike Honda
- Norm Dicks
- Mike Michaud
- Jim Moran
- Ben Chandler
- Susan Davis
- Chris Van Hollen
- Jim McDermott
- Ruben Hinojosa
- Shelley Berkley
- Edward Markey
- Tim Walz
- Jim Matheson
