= Mark Kirk =

American politician (born 1959)

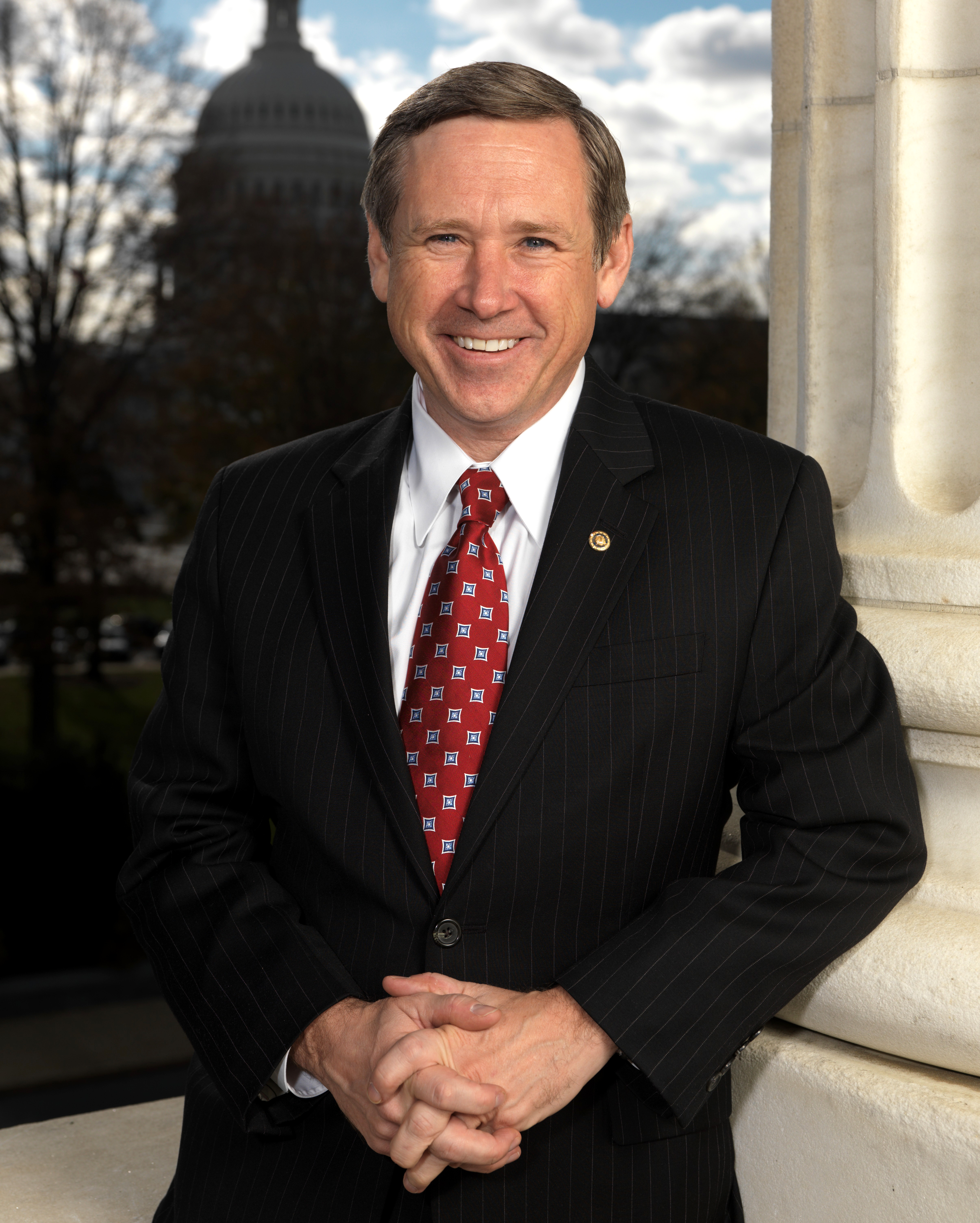
- Official portrait, 2010

United States Senator from Illinois
- In office November 29, 2010 – January 3, 2017
- Preceded by: Roland Burris
- Succeeded by: Tammy Duckworth

Member of the U.S. House of Representatives from Illinois's 10th district
- In office January 3, 2001 – November 29, 2010
- Preceded by: John Porter
- Succeeded by: Bob Dold

Personal details
- Born: Mark Steven Kirk; September 15, 1959 (age 67) Champaign, Illinois, U.S.
- Party: Republican
- Spouse: Kimberly Vertolli (m. 2001; div. 2009)
- Education: Blackburn College (attended); Cornell University (BA); London School of Economics (MSc); Georgetown University (JD)
- Website: Senate website (archived)

Military service
- Branch/service: United States Navy
- Years of service: 1989–2013
- Rank: Commander
- Unit: Naval Intelligence
- Battles/wars: NATO bombing of Yugoslavia; Operation Northern Watch
- Kirk's voice Kirk honoring State Rep. Betty Lou Reed. Recorded July 14, 2011

Mark Steven Kirk (born September 15, 1959) is an American retired politician and attorney who served as a United States senator from Illinois from 2010 to 2017, and as the United States representative for Illinois's 10th congressional district from 2001 to 2010. A member of the Republican Party, Kirk describes himself as socially liberal and fiscally conservative. As of 2026, he is the last Republican to represent Illinois in the U.S. Senate.

Born in Champaign, Illinois, Kirk graduated from Cornell University, the London School of Economics, and Georgetown University Law Center. He practiced law throughout the 1980s and 1990s. He joined the United States Navy Reserve as a direct commission officer in the intelligence career field in 1989 and was recalled to active duty for the 1999 NATO bombing of Yugoslavia. He participated in Operation Northern Watch in Iraq the following year. He attained the rank of Commander and retired from the Navy Reserve in 2013.

Kirk was elected to the House in 2000. During his fifth term in November 2010, he won two concurrent elections: to finish the final months of former senator Barack Obama's term and to serve the next six-year term. He was sworn in on November 29, 2010, and began a six-year Senate term on January 3, 2011. In January 2012, Kirk suffered a stroke; almost a full year passed before he returned to his senatorial duties. In 2016, Kirk ran for re-election to a second full term, but was defeated by Democrat Tammy Duckworth.

== Early life and education ==
Kirk as president of Seal and Serpent in 1981

Kirk was born in Champaign, Illinois, the son of Judith Ann (Brady) and Francis Gabriel "Frank" Kirk. After graduating from New Trier East High School in 1977 he attended Blackburn College in Carlinville, Illinois, for two years, before briefly attending the Autonomous University of Mexico and subsequently transferring to Cornell University, where he graduated cum laude with a bachelor's degree in History. While at Cornell University, Kirk served as the president of The Seal and Serpent Society. Kirk later obtained a master's degree from the London School of Economics and a Juris Doctor (JD) from Georgetown University Law Center.

== Early career ==
While Kirk was an undergraduate student at Cornell University he held a work–study job supervising a play group at the Forest Home Chapel nursery school. After getting his master's degree, Kirk taught for one year at a private school in London. He later stated in speeches and interviews that he had been a nursery and middle school teacher. A leader at the church which housed the nursery school expressed her belief that Kirk overstated his role there, saying Kirk was "just an additional pair of hands to help a primary teaching person." In discussing problems in the educational system early in his congressional career, Kirk addressed the brevity of his teaching career: "I did leave the teaching profession, but if we had addressed some of the teacher development issues, which I want to raise with you, I might have stayed."

After college, Kirk worked in Congressman John Porter's office, ultimately becoming chief of staff. After leaving Capitol Hill in 1990, he worked at the World Bank and as an aide at the State Department on the Central American peace process. Kirk spent two years practicing international law and four years as counsel to the House International Relations Committee.

== Military service ==
Kirk was commissioned as an intelligence officer in the United States Navy Reserve in 1989.

In 1999, Kirk was recalled to active duty in Operation Allied Force for the bombing of Yugoslavia. He served from April 10 to June 6, 1999, as the intelligence officer of VAQ-209. VAQ-209 was combined with three other EA-6B squadrons to form an ad hoc unit called Electronic Attack Wing Aviano, Italy. VAQ-140 had tactical command of the combined unit. In May 2000, the National Military Intelligence Association bestowed the organization's Vice Admiral Rufus L. Taylor Award to Intelligence Division Electronic Attack Wing Aviano, Italy.

In March and April 2000, Kirk trained with an EC-130 squadron based in Turkey. Kirk took a flight over Iraq as part of Operation Northern Watch, which enforced a no-fly zone over the northern section of Iraq. In a speech on the floor of the House in 2003, Kirk stated: "The last time I was in Iraq I was in uniform, flying at 20,000 feet, and the Iraqi Air Defense network was shooting at us". Kirk later clarified his statement, indicating that there is no record of his aircraft being fired upon and that he had incorrectly recalled the incident.

During his tenure in the military, Kirk was twice counseled by the Pentagon, after incidents in which he was accused of conducting political business while on duty. On one occasion Kirk commented on Rod Blagojevich's arrest and posted a tweet while on duty with the Navy in Afghanistan. According to the Pentagon, Kirk was required to sign a statement acknowledging he knew the rules before returning to active duty. Kirk denied that he had ever improperly mixed politics with his military service.

Kirk served three individual two-week reserve deployments in Afghanistan, with the latest concluding in September 2011.

Kirk retired from the Navy Reserve in May 2013, after 23 years of service. A formal military retirement ceremony was held for Kirk on December 16, 2014.

=== Awards ===
In the official photograph of his retirement ceremony, Kirk's awards include:

- Defense Meritorious Service Medal
- Joint Services Commendation Medal
- Navy and Marine Corps Commendation Medal
- Joint Service Achievement Medal
- Navy and Marine Corps Achievement Medal
- Navy Unit Commendation
- Navy Meritorious Unit Commendation with Service Star
- National Defense Service Medal
- Kosovo Campaign Medal
- Global War on Terrorism Service Medal
- Armed Forces Reserve Medal with "M" device
- NATO Medal for the former Yugoslavia
- NATO Medal for Kosovo

His uniform also displays the Navy Information Dominance Officer badge and the Office of the Joint Chiefs of Staff Identification Badge.

In 2010, Kirk corrected statements he had made about being awarded "Navy Intelligence Officer of the Year" after it was brought to the media's attention by his Democratic opponent, Alexi Giannoulias. In a 2002 House committee hearing recorded by C-SPAN, Kirk said, "I was the Navy's Intelligence Officer of the Year", an achievement he said gave him special qualifications to discuss national security spending. In May 2010, The Washington Post reported that Kirk's claim to having been named the Navy's "Intelligence Officer of the Year" was erroneous. The National Military Intelligence Association gave the Vice Admiral Rufus L. Taylor Award to the entire Intelligence Division Electronic Attack Wing at Aviano. Kirk was the lead intelligence officer for VAQ-209, one of the four squadrons assigned to the Electronic Attack Wing. VAQ-140 had tactical command. Kirk later apologized for this and other errors, including a claim made by his office of having participated in Operation Desert Storm when in fact he did not.

On June 7, 2010, Medal of Honor recipient and advocate of Veteran's benefits, Allen Lynch, deemed Mark Kirk's apologies adequate, and further commented: "To me, in my opinion, it's just a bunch of nit picking. Plus, he's done a Christ ton for veterans. So I think this is being blown way out of proportion".

== Early political career ==
Kirk worked on the staff of John Porter, the congressman for Illinois's 10th congressional district. From 1991 to 1993, Kirk was the Special Assistant to the Assistant Secretary of State in the U.S. State Department. Kirk was an attorney for Baker & McKenzie from 1993 to 1995. In 1995 Kirk was named as a counsel to the House International Relations Committee. He remained counsel to the House International Relations Committee until 1999.

== U.S. House of Representatives ==
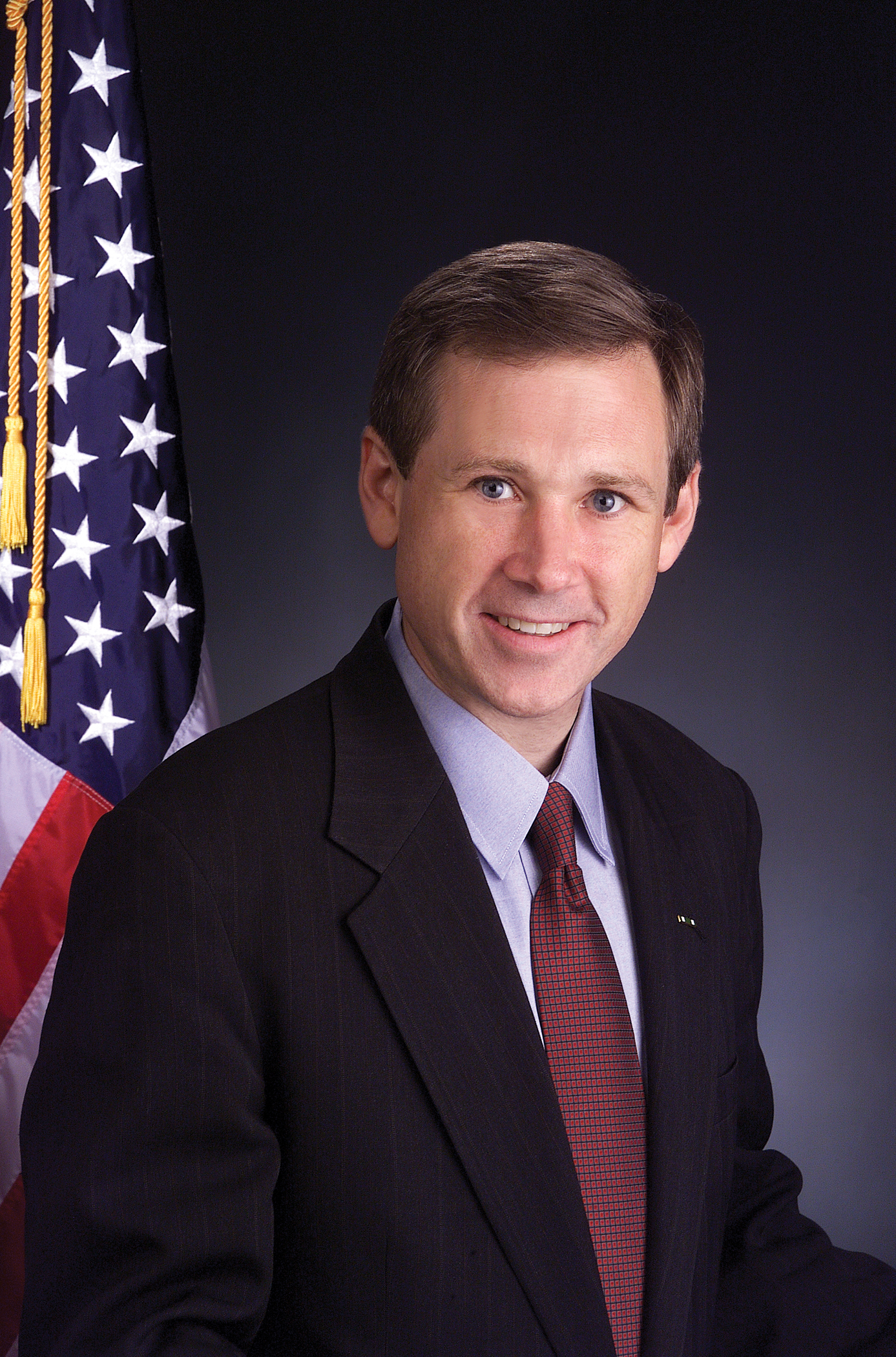
Kirk during the 107th Congress

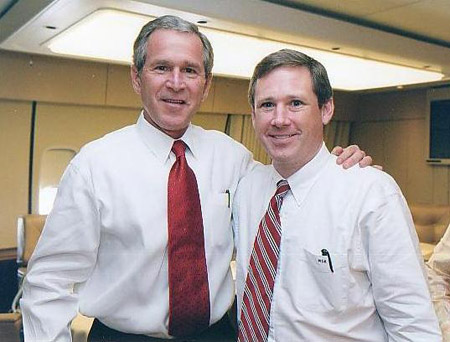
Kirk with President George W. Bush on Air Force One in 2002

=== Elections ===
Kirk was elected in 2000 to succeed the retiring Porter. He won with 51% of the vote against Democrat Lauren Beth Gash, and was reelected by comfortable margins in 2002 and 2004. He defeated Democrat Dan Seals by seven points in 2006, defeating him again by the same margin in a 2008 rematch.

=== Tenure ===
During his time in the House, Kirk compiled a centrist voting record, tending to vote more liberally on social issues and more conservatively on foreign policy issues. Kirk was a member of the House Iran Working Group, the founder and co-chair of the House U.S.-China Working Group, the co-chair of the Congressional Caucus on Armenian Issues, the co-chair of the Albanian Issues Caucus in ex Yugoslavia, and chair of The Tuesday Group, a group of moderate Republicans in the U.S. House. During his House tenure, he was a member of the House Appropriations Committee.

Kirk was responsible for an amendment in 2004 which requires the Congressional Budget Office to annually publish a comparison of projected spending on entitlements with actual spending for the previous year. He also fought against spending on the Alaska "bridge to nowhere" and pushed for reforms in the intelligence community.

In 2005, Kirk stated that he was not opposed to the immigration process in the United States discriminating against young Arab males from "terrorist-producing states". He stated, "I think that when we look at the threat that's out there, young men between, say, the ages of 18 and 25 from a couple of countries, I believe a certain amount of intense scrutiny should be placed on them."

In 2006, Kirk pushed for an expansion of O'Hare and worked with Rahm Emanuel on a package to clean up Lake Michigan.

In June 2008, Kirk introduced H.R. 6257 to reinstate the assault weapons ban of 1994. The bill was co-sponsored by fellow Republicans Mike Castle, Mike Ferguson, Ileana Ros-Lehtinen, and Chris Shays. Four years earlier, in February 2004, Kirk had been among 11 Republican and 129 Democratic co-sponsors of H.R. 3831 to reauthorize the ban. Both bills died in committee.

In 2009, Kirk voted for the American Clean Energy and Security Act.

== U.S. Senate ==
=== Elections ===
==== 2010 ====
On July 20, 2009, Kirk announced his candidacy for the U.S. Senate election for the seat held by Roland Burris, which had been held by Barack Obama before his election as president. On February 2, 2010, Kirk won the Republican primary with 56.6 percent of the vote; no other candidate had as much as 20 percent. He ran against Democratic nominee Alexi Giannoulias, Green Party nominee LeAlan Jones, and Libertarian nominee Mike Labno. During the fall campaign, Kirk and Giannoulias held a televised debate amid polls suggesting a close race. Kirk defeated Giannoulias in the election for the full six-year term, getting 48% to Giannoulias's 46%. During the campaign, Kirk said he had previously voted for emissions trading legislation "because it was in the narrow interests of my congressional district", but that as a representative of the entire state of Illinois, "I would vote no on that bill."

In 2012, Kirk's ex-wife accused him of concealing a payment of $143,000 to a former girlfriend, Dodie McCracken, who had worked on his 2010 U.S. Senate campaign. The Federal Election Commission dismissed allegations that the Kirk campaign had hidden the payments, saying they did not need to be disclosed because the girlfriend worked as a subcontractor on the campaign.

==== 2016 ====
Having suffered a stroke in 2012 there was speculation he would resign, but in June 2013, Kirk confirmed that he was planning to run for re-election. In November 2014, Kirk reiterated his plans to seek re-election. Kirk defeated fellow Republican James Marter in the primary election. He faced Democratic congresswoman Tammy Duckworth in the general election.

Kirk's campaign purchased television air time to advertise his opposition to admitting refugees to the United States "until it can be done safely".

In a televised debate on October 27, 2016, Kirk responded to Duckworth's comment about her own military service and her ancestors' military service by saying, "I'd forgotten that your parents came all the way from Thailand to serve George Washington." Rep. Duckworth is a military combat veteran who lost both legs while piloting a helicopter during the Iraq war. Her mother was a Thai immigrant and her father's ancestors came to America before the Revolutionary War. Due to his comments, the Human Rights Campaign revoked their endorsement of Kirk and switched it to Duckworth, saying his comments were "deeply offensive and racist." It was the first endorsement the HRC has ever withdrawn.

On November 8, 2016, Kirk lost to Duckworth by 828,248 votes, 55% to 40%.

=== Political positions ===
Kirk is a moderate Republican. Kirk was sworn in on November 29, 2010, as the junior U.S. senator from Illinois. Kirk sat at the Senate's coveted Candy Desk for several years. Kirk is considered to be a social moderate and fiscal conservative. On June 7, 2016, Kirk withdrew his initial support for businessman and presumptive Republican nominee Donald Trump in the 2016 presidential election due to his "past attacks on Hispanics, women and the disabled like me". Kirk said he would write-in former CIA director David Petraeus. Kirk was ranked as the 6th most bipartisan member of the U.S. Senate during the 114th United States Congress, and the fourth most bipartisan member of the U.S. Senate from the American Midwest (after Indiana senator Joe Donnelly, Ohio senator Rob Portman, and Iowa senator Chuck Grassley) in the Bipartisan Index created by the Lugar Center and the McCourt School of Public Policy that ranks members of the United States Congress by their degree of bipartisanship (by measuring the frequency each member's bills attract co-sponsors from the opposite party and each member's co-sponsorship of bills by members of the opposite party).

==== Infrastructure and transportation policy ====
In his first year in the Senate, Kirk worked along with U.S. senator Dick Durbin (D–IL) to help mediate a dispute between airlines serving O'Hare International Airport and the City of Chicago in order to keep the O'Hare modernization project on schedule. It is estimated the project would create 200,000 jobs and add $18 billion to the regional economy when completed.

Kirk and Durbin also worked together to bring $186 million in federal funds to support improved rail service from Chicago to St. Louis. The money was originally rejected by the state of Florida but reallocated to Illinois.

Kirk authored legislation, entitled the Lincoln Legacy Infrastructure Development Act, that sought to eliminate barriers and encourage private investment in roads, transit, airport and rail. Several of the provisions in the legislation would later become law under the Moving Ahead for Progress in the 21st Century Act (P.L. 112–114), including provisions to eliminate barriers to public-private partnerships for public transportation projects and a boost for the Transportation Infrastructure Finance and Innovation Act (TIFA) program.

==== Environmental policy ====
Along with then senator Carl Levin (D-MI), Kirk co-chaired the Senate's Great Lakes Task Force, and on June 26, 2013, the two introduced the Great Lakes Ecological and Economic Protection Act (GLEEPA). This legislation authorizes more funds to the Great Lakes Restoration Initiative in their efforts to restore wetlands, control invasive species, and regulate dumping of sewage and other industrial byproducts into the Great Lakes watershed. It also re-authorizes the Environmental Protection Agency's Great Lakes national Program Office and Great Lakes Legacy Act, which addresses dumping of toxic waste. Kirk had introduced similar legislation before, and Kirk had been a longstanding supporter of efforts to keep invasive Asian Carp out of the Great Lakes ecosystem.

Kirk accepts the scientific consensus on climate change.

==== Iran ====
In 2016, Kirk suggested that Iran should be required to provide reports about how funds made available through sanctions relief were used to ensure that money was not ending up in the hands of Hezbollah or the Iranian military.

==== Qatar ====
In May 2016, Kirk petitioned the Treasury Department to be more aggressive towards Qatar's financing of terrorism.

==== Illinois debt crisis ====
Kirk appointed a sovereign debt advisory board to help research the unfunded obligations and unpaid bills contributing to Illinois' debt crisis. He later produced the Report on Illinois Debt highlighting the unsustainable debt the state continued to hold and the need for pension reform. Kirk introduced legislation entitled No State Bailouts, S. Res. 188, along with 14 other U.S. senators, which would ban federal bailouts of financially struggling states. Illinois state treasurer Dan Rutherford endorsed the legislation.

==== Anti-corruption work ====
Kirk and Representative Bob Dold (R–IL-10) (who succeeded him in his House seat) introduced bipartisan legislation to expand qualifications for ending federal pension payouts to elected officials convicted of corruption. The bicameral provision expanded current law to include an additional 22 crimes, and the bill was included in the STOCK Act signed by the President in April 2012.

==== Social issues ====
Kirk voted for re-authorization of the Violence Against Women Act in 2013.

Kirk is pro-choice. In 2015, he was one of two Republicans to oppose a ban on abortions after 20 weeks. Kirk opposes Republican Party efforts to defund Planned Parenthood. In September 2015, Kirk and Senator Durbin were thanked by the presidents of the Planned Parenthood Action Fund and Planned Parenthood Illinois Action for their opposition to such measures. He has a lifetime 75% grade from Planned Parenthood and an 80% rating in 2015 from NARAL Pro-Choice America, both organizations that support legal abortion access. Conversely, he had a 55% score from the pro-life Campaign for Working Families which opposes abortion. The pro-life group, Illinois Right to Life, gave Kirk a 0% rating.

In May 2010, Kirk voted against the repeal of Don't Ask, Don't Tell. In December 2010, Kirk joined seven other Senate Republicans in voting in favor of the policy's repeal. In 2015, he was one of 11 Senate Republicans who voted to offer social security benefits to same-sex couples living in states where same-sex marriage was not yet recognized.

On April 2, 2013, Kirk became the second sitting Republican U.S. senator to support same-sex marriage, joining Ohio Senator Rob Portman. He was given a 100% score from the Human Rights Campaign, which supports same-sex marriage and LGBT rights, and a 100% score by PFLAG or Parents, Families, and Friends of Lesbians and Gays.

Kirk is a cosponsor and strong supporter of the Employment Non-Discrimination Act (ENDA) and in November 2013 became one of several Republicans to vote in favor of the law, which would prohibit employment discrimination on the basis of sexual orientation and gender identity.

In January 2016, Kirk became the first Republican U.S. senator to co-sponsor the Equality Act, which would make sex, sexual orientation and gender identity among the prohibited categories of discrimination or segregation under the 1964 Civil Rights Act.

==== Labor ====
In April 2014, the United States Senate debated the Minimum Wage Fairness Act (S. 1737; 113th Congress). The bill would amend the Fair Labor Standards Act of 1938 (FLSA) to increase the federal minimum wage for employees to $10.10 per hour over the course of a two-year period. The bill was supported by President Barack Obama and many Democratic senators, but opposed by Republicans in the Senate and House. Kirk said he would not vote for the bill or a related compromise bill.

Kirk voted in April 2014 to extend federal funding for unemployment benefits. Federal funding had been initiated in 2008 and expired at the end of 2013.

In March 2015, Kirk voted for an amendment to establish a deficit-neutral reserve fund to allow employees to earn paid sick time.

==== Gun policy ====
Kirk is the only Republican U.S. senator to receive an "F" grade from the NRA Political Victory Fund. In 2015, he received a lifetime achievement award from the Illinois Council Against Handgun Violence. He supports background checks for gun sales, and in 2013 was the only Republican senator to vote for an assault weapons ban.

==== Other policy issues ====
In 2011, Kirk was one of only two Republicans to oppose legislation to detain American citizens indefinitely.

In the aftermath of the downing of a Malaysian Airlines flight by missiles over Ukraine in 2014, Kirk called for an investigation into the possibility of outfitting commercial airliners with missile defense systems.

In 2014, Kirk co-sponsored legislation to re-authorize the Export-Import Bank.

After the death of U.S. Supreme Court justice Antonin Scalia in 2016, Kirk was the first Republican U.S. Senator to publicly state that President Barack Obama's eventual replacement nominee for the Supreme Court should get a hearing and a vote. Other Republicans believed the next president should nominate a replacement for Scalia. In April 2016, Kirk met with Obama's nominee, Merrick Garland, and circulated a memo to his Republican colleagues encouraging them to meet with him as well.

=== Caucus memberships ===
- Albanian Issue Caucus (Co-Chair)
- Congressional Diabetes Caucus (Vice-Chair)
- International Conservation Caucus
- Republican Main Street Partnership
- Senate Ukraine Caucus (Vice-Chair)

=== Committee assignments ===
- Committee on Appropriations
  - Subcommittee on Financial Services and General Government
  - Subcommittee on Labor, Health and Human Services, Education and Related Agencies
  - Subcommittee on Military Construction, Veterans Affairs, and Related Agencies (Chair)
  - Subcommittee on State, Foreign Operations, and Related Programs
  - Subcommittee on Transportation, Housing and Urban Development, and Related Agencies
- Committee on Banking, Housing, and Urban Affairs
  - Subcommittee on Housing, Transportation, and Community Development
  - Subcommittee on Security and International Trade and Finance (Chair)
  - Subcommittee on Securities, Insurance, and Investment
- Committee on Health, Education, Labor, and Pensions
  - Subcommittee on Children and Families
  - Subcommittee on Employment and Workplace Safety
- Special Committee on Aging

== Personal life ==
In February 1998, Kirk met Kimberly Vertolli, a Naval Intelligence Officer, while the two were on duty together at the Pentagon. The two married in 2001 and divorced in 2009.

=== Stroke and recovery ===
On January 21, 2012, at age 52, Kirk suffered an ischemic stroke caused by a damaged blood vessel in his neck. Two days later, he underwent neurosurgery at Northwestern Memorial Hospital in Chicago; a piece of his cranium was temporarily removed to lessen any danger from the brain swelling process. He underwent follow-up surgery two days after that to remove more of his skull and some damaged brain tissue. He suffered significant left-sided weakness and spent several months at an inpatient physical rehabilitation center.

On May 1, 2012, Kirk was sent home from the rehabilitation center. A statement from his family said he would continue to work on rehabilitation on an outpatient basis, but that he had progressed enough to be able to move home with his family. A week later, Kirk's staff released a video showing Kirk walking on a treadmill and down a hallway at the Rehabilitation Institute of Chicago as doctors worked with him to help fully regain the use of his left side. A second video was released in August, showing Kirk was living at his Fort Sheridan, Illinois home, and while his left side still showed impairment, Kirk was walking without aid. On November 4, he participated in a "SkyRise Chicago" challenge to climb the stairs of Willis Tower, successfully completing 37 floors.

On January 3, 2013, Kirk returned to the Capitol for the first time since his stroke in time for the start of the 113th Congress. He was escorted up the Capitol steps by Vice President and President of the Senate Joe Biden.

Kirk returned to his role as senator, at times using a cane or wheelchair for assistance. He cites his public role as motivation to return to work and to serve as an example for families suffering from stroke and his stroke itself as motivation to improve early stroke detection and rehabilitation.

== Electoral history ==
Illinois's 10th Congressional district Republican Primary election, 2000
Party	Candidate	Votes	%	+%
Republican	Mark Kirk	19,717	31%	
Republican	Shawn Margaret Donnelley	9,585	15%	
Republican	Mark William Damisch	9,016	14%	
Republican	Andrew Hochberg	7,480	12%	
Republican	John H. Cox	6,339	10%	
Republican	Scott Phelps	3,712	6%	
Republican	Thomas Fredric "Tom" Lachner	2,555	4%	
Republican	Terry Gladman	2,172	3%	
Republican	James Goulka	1,469	2%	
Republican	John Guy	397	1%	
Republican	Jon Stewart	363	1%	

Illinois's 10th congressional district: Results 2000–2008
Year	Democratic	Votes	Pct	Republican	Votes	Pct	
2000	Lauren Beth Gash	115,924	49%	Mark Kirk	121,582	51%	
2002	Henry H. Perritt, Jr.	58,300	31%	Mark Kirk (incumbent)	128,611	69%	
2004	Lee Goodman	99,218	36%	Mark Kirk (incumbent)	177,493	64%	
2006	Daniel J. Seals	94,278	47%	Mark Kirk (incumbent)	107,929	53%	*
2008	Daniel J. Seals	138,176	47%	Mark Kirk (incumbent)	153,082	53%	
*Write-in and minor candidate notes: In 2006, a write-in received 1 vote.

United States Senate election in Illinois Republican Primary, 2010
Party	Candidate	Votes	%
Republican	Mark Kirk	420,373	56.6
Republican	Patrick Hughes	142,928	19.3
Republican	Donald Lowery	66,357	8.9
Republican	Kathleen Thomas	54,038	7.3
Republican	Andy Martin	37,480	5.0
Republican	John Arrington	21,090	2.8
Republican	Patricia Beard	2	.0003
Total votes		742,268	100.0%

United States Senate special election in Illinois, 2010
Party	Candidate	Votes	%
Republican	Mark Kirk	1,677,729	47.3
Democratic	Alexi Giannoulias	1,641,486	46.3
Green	LeAlan Jones	129,571	3.7
Libertarian	Michael Labno	95,762	2.7
Write-In	Robert Zadek	683	.02
Write-In	Will Boyd	415	.01
Write-In	Ina Pinkney	297	.01
Write-In	Corey Dabney	15	.0004
Write-In	Susanne Atanus	12	.0003
Write-In	Shon-Tiyon Horton	8	.0002
Write-In	Stan Jagla	5	.0001
Write-In	Lowell M. Seida	1	.00002
Total votes		3,545,984	100.00%

United States Senate election in Illinois, 2010
Party	Candidate	Votes	%	±%
Republican	Mark Kirk	1,778,698	48.0	+21.0
Democratic	Alexi Giannoulias	1,719,478	46.4	−25.6
Green	LeAlan Jones	117,914	3.2	N/A
Libertarian	Michael Labno	87,247	2.4	+1.1
Write-In	Bob Zadek	561	0.02	N/A
Write-In	Will Boyd	468	0.01	N/A
Write-In	Corey Dabney	33	.0009	N/A
Write-In	Susanne Atanus	19	.0005	N/A
Write-In	Shon-Tiyon Horton	16	.0004	N/A
Write-In	Avner Nagar	15	.0004	N/A
Write-In	Stan Jagla	12	.0003	N/A
Write-In	Darren Raichart	9	.0002	N/A
Write-In	Lowell M. Seida	3	.00008	
Majority		59,220	1.6	−51.4
Turnout		3,704,473		−27.9
Republican gain from Democratic		Swing		

United States Senate election in Illinois Republican Primary, 2016
Party	Candidate	Votes	%	±%
Republican	Mark Kirk (Incumbent)	931,619	70.6	+14.0
Republican	James T. Marter	388,571	29.4	N/A
Majority		543,048	41.2	+3.9
Turnout		1,320,191		+77.9

United States Senate election in Illinois, 2016
Party	Candidate	Votes	%	±%
Democratic	Tammy Duckworth	3,012,940	54.9	+8.5
Republican	Mark Kirk (Incumbent)	2,184,692	39.8	−8.2
Libertarian	Kenton McMillen	175,988	3.2	+0.8
Green	Scott Summers	117,619	2.1	−1.1
Write-In	Chad Koppie	408	.007	N/A
Write-In	Jim Brown	106	.002	N/A
Write-In	Christopher Aguayo	77	.001	N/A
Write-In	Susana Sandoval	42	.0008	N/A
Write-In	Eric Kufi James Stewart	5	.00009	N/A
Write-In	Patricia Beard	1	.00002	N/A
Majority		828,249	15.1	+13.5
Turnout		5,491,878		+48.2
Democratic gain from Republican		Swing		

U.S. House of Representatives
Preceded by John Porter	Member of the U.S. House of Representatives from Illinois's 10th congressional district 2001–2010	Succeeded by Bob Dold
Party political offices
Preceded by Mike Castle; Nancy Johnson; Fred Upton	Chair of the Tuesday Group; 2005–2010; Served alongside: Charles Bass (2005–2007), Charlie Dent (2007–2010), Jo Ann Emerson (2010)	Succeeded by Charlie Dent; Jo Ann Emerson
Preceded by Alan Keyes	Republican nominee for U.S. Senator from Illinois (Class 3); 2010, 2016	Succeeded by Kathy Salvi
U.S. Senate
Preceded by Roland Burris	U.S. Senator (Class 3) from Illinois; 2010–2017; Served alongside: Dick Durbin	Succeeded by Tammy Duckworth
U.S. order of precedence (ceremonial)
Preceded by Peter Fitzgerald as Former U.S. Senator	Order of precedence of the United States	Succeeded by Tim Hutchinson as Former U.S. Senator
