= 2026 Illinois Secretary of State election =

- November 3, 2026
- Reporting: 95.7% as of 1:00 PM CST
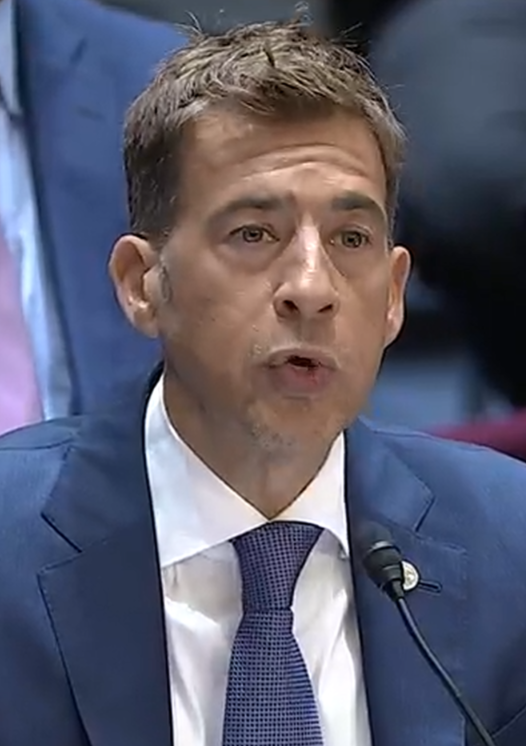

Nominee	Alexi Giannoulias	Diane Harris
Party	Democratic	Republican
Popular vote	2,631,753	1,431,184
Percentage	64.8%	35.2%
- Giannoulias: 50–60% 60–70% 70–80% 80–90% Harris: 50–60% 60–70% 70–80% 80–90%
Secretary of State before election
Alexi Giannoulias
Democratic
Elected Secretary of State
Alexi Giannoulias
Democratic

The 2026 Illinois Secretary of State election was held on November 3, 2026, to elect the Illinois Secretary of State. Incumbent Democratic secretary Alexi Giannoulias won re-election. Primary elections were held on March 17, 2026.

== Democratic primary ==
=== Candidates ===
==== Nominee ====
- Alexi Giannoulias, incumbent secretary of state (2023–present)

=== Endorsements ===
Alexi Giannoulias

Labor unions

- Illinois AFL-CIO
- International Union of Operating Engineers Locals 150 and 399
- SEIU Healthcare
- SEIU Illinois State Council

Organizations

- Cook County Democratic Party
- New Trier Democrats

=== Results ===
Democratic primary results
Party	Candidate	Votes	%
Democratic	Alexi Giannoulias (incumbent)	1,171,435	100.0
Total votes		1,171,435	100.0

== Republican primary ==
=== Candidates ===
==== Nominee ====
- Diane Harris, Joliet Junior College trustee and nominee for Illinois's 43rd State Senate district in 2022

==== Eliminated in primary ====
- Walter Adamczyk, committeeman for Chicago's 29th ward

=== Endorsements ===
Diane Harris

Newspapers

- Chicago Tribune
- Daily Herald

=== Results ===
Results by county Harris: 50–60%; 60–70%; 70–80%; Adamczyk: 50–60%

Republican primary results
Party	Candidate	Votes	%
Republican	Diane Harris	279,727	53.0
Republican	Walter Adamczyk	248,198	47.0
Total votes		527,925	100.0

== General elections ==
=== Predictions ===
Source	Ranking	As of
Sabato's Crystal Ball	Safe D	August 7, 2025

=== Polling ===
Poll source	Date(s) administered	Sample size (Note: Key: A – all adults RV – registered voters LV – likely voters V – unclear)	Margin of error	Alexi Giannoulias (D)	Diane M. Harris (R)	Other	Undecided
Public Policy Polling (Note: Poll conducted for Chicago News Weekly.)	September 30 – October 1, 2026	569 (LV)	—	55%	37%	—	8%

=== Results ===
2026 Illinois Secretary of State election
Party	Candidate	Votes	%	±%
Democratic	Alexi Giannoulias (incumbent)			
Republican	Diane M. Harris			
Total votes			100.0	

== Notes ==
Partisan clients

== See also ==
- 2026 Illinois elections
- 2026 United States secretary of state elections
- Illinois Secretary of State
