= Alexi Giannoulias =

American politician (born 1976)

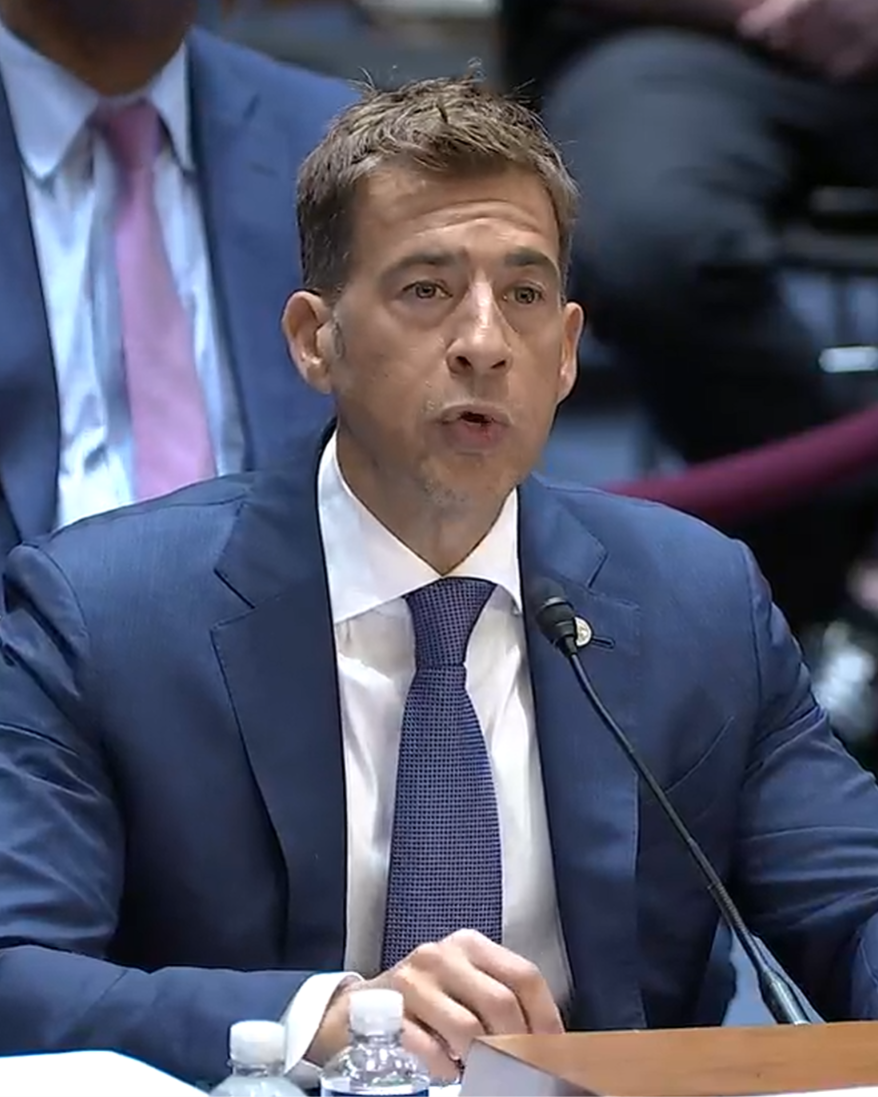
- Giannoulias during a U.S. Senate Judiciary Committee hearing in 2023

38th Secretary of State of Illinois
- Incumbent
- Assumed office January 9, 2023
- Governor: JB Pritzker
- Preceded by: Jesse White

72nd Treasurer of Illinois
- In office January 8, 2007 – January 10, 2011
- Governor: Rod Blagojevich; Pat Quinn
- Preceded by: Judy Baar Topinka
- Succeeded by: Dan Rutherford

Personal details
- Born: Alexander Giannoulias; March 16, 1976 (age 50) Chicago, Illinois, U.S.
- Party: Democratic
- Spouse: Jo Terlato (m. 2014)
- Children: 4
- Education: University of Chicago (attended); Boston University (BA); Tulane University (JD)

Alexander Giannoulias (/əˈlɛksi dʒəˈnuːliəs/ jə-NOO-lee-əs; born March 16, 1976) is an American politician who has served as the 38th secretary of state of Illinois since 2023. He previously served as the 72nd treasurer of Illinois from 2007 to 2011.

A member of the Democratic Party, Giannoulias defeated Republican nominee Christine Radogno with 54 percent of the vote in the 2006 election for Illinois treasurer. He became the first Democrat to hold the office in 12 years. Giannoulias was the Democratic candidate in the 2010 U.S. Senate election in Illinois, but narrowly lost the general election to Republican Mark Kirk. He returned to public service in 2018 when he was confirmed to the Chicago Public Library Board.

Giannoulias was elected secretary of state in 2022, defeating Dan Brady to succeed longtime incumbent Jesse White, and was re-elected in 2026. Giannoulias is running for mayor of Chicago in 2027.

== Early life and education ==
Giannoulias was born in Chicago, Illinois, to Greek immigrants. His mother, Anna, is from Chania, and his late father, Alexis, was from Kalavryta. He has two older brothers, Demetris and George. Giannoulias attended and played basketball at the Latin School of Chicago. He attended the University of Chicago and then transferred to Boston University. Giannoulias received a bachelor's degree with a major in economics from Boston University in 1998. He moved to Greece, Europe, to play basketball with Panionios B.C. for a year, from 1998 to 1999.

After returning from Greece, Giannoulias attended the Tulane University School of Law and received a Juris Doctor degree. He returned to Chicago to take a management position with Broadway Bank, a community bank in Chicago's Edgewater neighborhood founded by his father in 1979.

Giannoulias served on the board of directors of the Community Banker's Association of Illinois Legislative Committee, the South Side/Wabash YMCA, and the Edgewater Chamber of Commerce. Giannoulias also founded and chaired the AG Foundation, a not-for-profit charity that donated money to treat child-related illnesses, curb poverty and assist disaster relief organizations.

== Illinois Treasurer ==
=== Elections ===
Although the state Democratic Party led by House Speaker Mike Madigan backed his opponent, Paul Mangieri, in the primary, Giannoulias was endorsed by U.S. Representatives Jan Schakowsky, Jesse Jackson Jr., and by then-Senator Barack Obama.

The Chicago Sun-Times news group also endorsed Giannoulias in the general election, arguing that he would "bring valuable private enterprise experience from banking to the job" and praising his "creative" policy proposals like a securities lending program, improving Bright Start, and promoting green energy. Running on a campaign platform that emphasized comprehensive ethics reform for the Treasurer's office, Giannoulias won the March 2006 primary and went on to defeat Republican candidate Christine Radogno in the general election.

=== Tenure ===
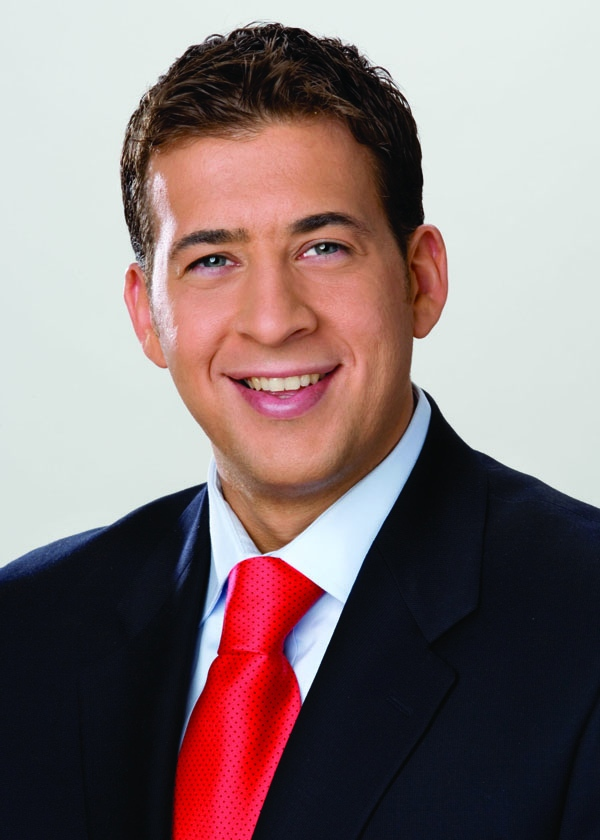
Giannoulias's official portrait as State Treasurer, 2005

==== Ethics reform ====
On his first day as State Treasurer, Giannoulias "signed an executive order to enact the most comprehensive, widest-ranging ethics package of any elected official in the state", according to his official state website. "The order prohibits [the Treasurer] from accepting contributions from banks, Treasurer's Office employees and contractors who do business with the office." He also moved to foreclose on two debt-ridden hotels built in the 1980s by politically connected insiders in Springfield and Collinsville.

==== Hartmarx ====
In 2009, Giannoulias worked to encourage Wells Fargo to cooperate in the sale of Chicago-based clothing manufacturer Hartmarx Corp., which was at risk of liquidation and had filed for Chapter 11 protection. The success of this sale with Giannoulias' support saved over 600 jobs at an Illinois Hartmarx factory that otherwise would have been closed.

Wells Fargo, a primary lender for Hartmarx, is also "the money custodian for the treasurer's office, holding its cash and other financial assets." Giannoulias publicly challenged Wells Fargo's obstruction of the sale, stating that "[Wells Fargo's] intention to liquidate Hartmarx rather than allow a sale to buyers intent on keeping the company running will significantly jeopardize the business relationship between Wells Fargo and the state of Illinois."

Giannoulias cited the fact that Wells Fargo received over $25 billion in federal TARP bailout funds as further reason why the bank should have supported the sale of Hartmarx instead of pursuing the company's liquidation. In a public statement, Giannoulias said, "We expect companies that get state and federal taxpayer money to invest it in American jobs and American workers, not destroy companies that still have a chance to succeed."

==== Green Rewards ====
Giannoulias launched the "Green Rewards" program, which gives a $1,000 rebate to Illinois residents who purchase a new hybrid or other fuel-efficient vehicle.

==== Purchase of Israel Bonds ====
In January 2009, the state of Illinois purchased $10 million worth of Israel Bonds. Giannoulias said: "This is a good way to safely diversify our portfolio, especially during a time when some of our other investment options aren't generating as much revenue because of the market fluctuations here in the United States." According to Giannoulias, the Israel Bonds will mature in three years with a 2.43% rate of return, compared to U.S. government bonds yielding a 1.51% return during the same period.

==== Scholarship programs ====
In addition to revamping the Bright Start savings program, Giannoulias created several new scholarship programs for Illinois college students.

The Fallen Heroes Scholarship Program, which Giannoulias designed in a partnership with the Illinois Department of Veterans Affairs, awards an initial investment of $2,500 in college savings to children who have lost a parent in military service since 2001.

In 2008, Giannoulias announced the creation of the Bright Start Scholarship Program, which will award $3.5 million in need-based scholarships over 7 years, until 2015. More than 250 students received scholarships in 2008, the first year of the program. The scholarships were designed by Giannoulias as a public–private partnership, with the funding for the scholarships donated by a private firm at no cost to the state or taxpayers. Giannoulias also developed the Cultivate Illinois Excellence in Agriculture scholarship in 2008. This program awards ten $2,000 scholarships each year to students pursuing degrees in agriculture-related fields.

==== Bright Start ====
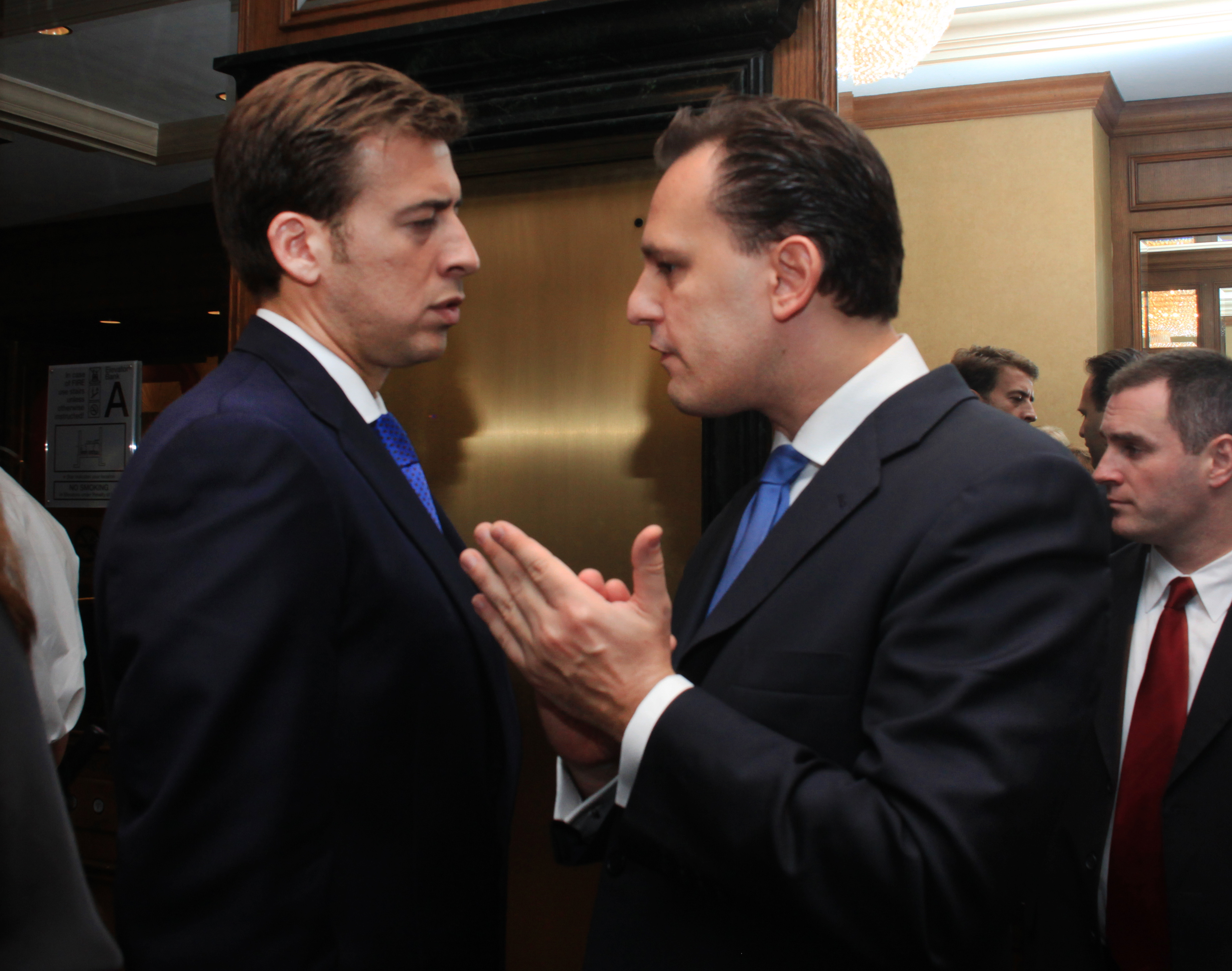
Giannoulias speaking with Greek Foreign Minister Dimitrios Droutsas in 2010

As Illinois Treasurer, Giannoulias was responsible for overseeing the Illinois' Bright Start college saving program. Bright Start provides parents with the opportunity to invest in a tax-free account to save for their children's college education. Enrollees are eligible for several state tax benefits and can invest in various stock and bond options. Before Giannoulias took office, SavingForCollege.com ranked Bright Start 47th out of 48 in the nation. Giannoulias helped reform the program, and Bright Start went from being one of the worst programs in the country to one of the best. Morningstar called the transformation "a Cinderella story."

In 2008, one of the twenty-one funds in Bright Start, Core Plus, began experiencing excessive losses and eventually lost 38% of its value. In the same year, the overall Bright Start program's benchmark grew by 5.4%. Within the Illinois Bright Start program, 2.5% of investors had invested their entire portfolios in Core Plus and suffered a 38% loss; others experienced smaller losses.

As the Associated Press reported, "It turns out the Oppenheimer team handling Core Plus — a team the company has now fired — was putting money into risky, complicated investments that tanked in 2008 amid the general financial meltdown." In 2009, Oregon, Nebraska, New Mexico, Texas, Maine and Illinois all investigated OppenheimerFunds' handling of their college savings programs for impermissible investments and misconduct. Oppenheimer was selected to lead the program by Giannoulias' predecessor, former Illinois Treasurer Judy Baar Topinka, in December 2006, a month before Giannoulias took office.

After the credit markets collapsed in the fall, new contributions into the fund were halted on December 4, 2008. In January 2009, the treasurer's office announced that no further contributions would be made to the Core Plus fund and that the state would be investigating the losses.

According to the Associated Press, Illinois was the first state to take action. In January 2009, at the request of Giannoulias, the Illinois Attorney General initiated its own probe of OppenheimerFunds, issuing subpoenas on the company. At the time, the losses attributable to OppenheimerFunds' impermissible investments were estimated to be "in excess of $85 million."

Despite the problem associated with OppenheimerFunds' handling of Core Plus, Bright Start remains a highly regarded 529 college savings program. In April 2009, Consumer Reports studied college savings programs across the country "to see how well they performed during last year's stock-market plunge." Consumer Reports "found five that are worthy of an A," and ranked Bright Start as one of the top five college savings programs in the nation. In April 2009, Money Magazine selected Bright Start as one of the "best low-risk 529 plans." In December 2009, Kiplingers selected Bright Start as one of the best state 529 plans in the country, choosing it as the best plan for "low fees." Morningstar, Inc., which had previously ranked Bright Start in its top 5 in 2008, has acknowledged the issues relating to Core Plus but, citing Illinois' swift action in dealing with the issue, reported in 2009 that "the plan still holds plenty of appeal."

In December 2009, the Illinois Attorney General's Office and the Office of the State Treasurer announced that Illinois had reached a settlement with OppenheimerFunds. Eligible accountholders who lost money in Core Plus would receive $77 million from OppenheimerFunds. As the scope of the settlement was expanded during negotiations with OppenheimerFunds to include more accountholders, the total loss addressed by the settlement is $150 million. Those families invested in the fund were eligible to receive just over half of their investment back.

The Treasurer's Office used some of the investment fees from the Bright Start program to purchase a hybrid vehicle "so Bright Start staff have a way to travel the state and enroll families in the program" and used to promote other Treasurer's Office programs. Giannoulias never used the vehicle for personal business.

==== Other efforts as Treasurer ====
Giannoulias started a pilot program in 2007 to sell the abandoned contents of safe deposit boxes on eBay, scrapping the state's annual live auctions.

== Broadway Bank ==
From 2002 to 2006, Giannoulias worked as a senior loan officer and vice president at Broadway Bank, a community bank founded by his father. When he left the bank in 2006, it was one of the most profitable banks in Illinois. Four years later, on January 26, 2010, Broadway Bank entered into a consent decree with the FDIC that ordered Broadway to increase its capital. Two dozen small- to medium-sized banks in Illinois and nearly 200 banks nationwide have failed since the October 2008 economic crash.

Broadway Bank's struggling financial situation is due to delinquent real estate loans and foreclosed properties. From 2002 to 2006, Broadway's lending in construction and development loans increased sixfold, to $356 million. During Giannoulias' tenure, Broadway also increased its brokered deposits, which generally command high interest rates. When Giannoulias left the bank in 2006, brokered deposits made up 80% of all deposits at Broadway. When the housing market crashed in late 2008, commercial real estate loan performance deteriorated and Broadway Bank, which had focused its lending in real estate, suffered.

Nine percent of the value of the bad loans originated while Giannoulias was chief loan officer.^{:1}

At the end of business on Friday, April 23, 2010, the Illinois Department of Financial and Professional Regulation, Division of Banking, seized Broadway Bank and appointed the Federal Deposit Insurance Corporation (FDIC) as receiver. The FDIC in turn named MB Financial Bank as the institution receiving Broadway Bank's deposit accounts. The FDIC announced that it and MB Financial Bank would share $878.4 million in losses, for a cost of $394.3 million to the federal Deposit Insurance Fund.

=== Loans made by Broadway Bank ===
Broadway Bank made real estate development loans to Tony Rezko, a political fundraiser and real estate developer who was later convicted of fraud and money laundering. Broadway Bank made these loans before Rezko was investigated, indicted, or convicted for any crimes, but not before the criminal conduct took place. Before his conviction, Rezko also received loans from other Chicago banks, including Bank of Chicago, First Bank and Trust of Illinois, GE Capital, Harris Trust and Savings, LaSalle Bank, and Manufacturers Bank.

Rezko defaulted on loans made by Broadway, and, in 2006 Broadway was the first bank to foreclose on one of Rezko's delinquent loans, forcing him to declare bankruptcy. Broadway Bank also refused to cover nine bad checks written by Rezko for a total of $450,000 in early 2008.

Giannoulias himself did not make the loans to Rezko, nor did Giannoulias ever accept campaign contributions from Rezko.

Broadway Bank also loaned money for real estate developments to Michael Giorango, who has been convicted for prostitution and bookmaking. Giannoulias has stated that he was not part of the loan committee that approved the loans to Giorango.

== 2010 U.S. Senate campaign ==
Giannoulias ran against Republican nominee Mark Kirk, Green Party nominee LeAlan Jones, and Libertarian nominee Mike Labno. As a candidate, Giannoulias pledged to create a "Senate Progressive Caucus", akin to the Congressional Progressive Caucus (CPC) in the House of Representatives.

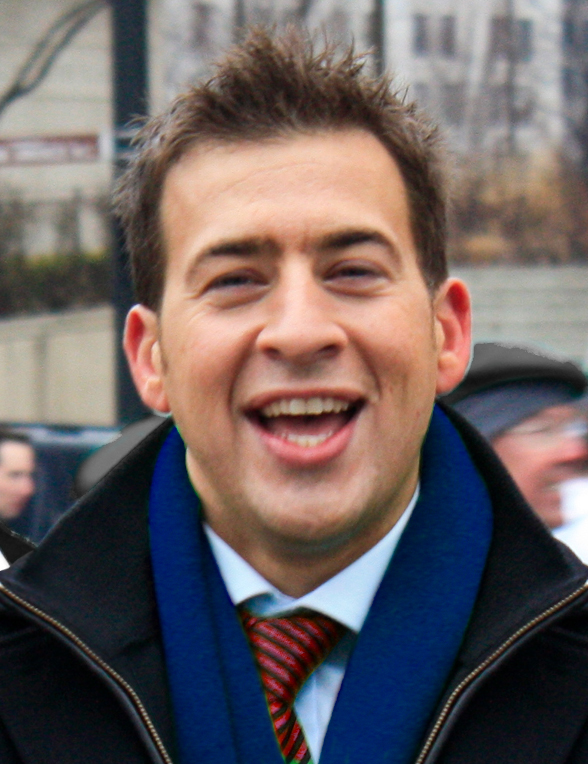
Giannoulias during his 2010 U.S. Senate campaign

On March 2, 2009, Giannoulias stated on CNBC that he was forming an exploratory committee in order to assess a potential candidacy for the US Senate in 2010. On July 26, 2009, he officially announced his candidacy for the United States Senate at the Hilton Chicago, the same place then-Senator Barack Obama endorsed Giannoulias for State Treasurer in 2006. He was introduced to the crowd by Congressman Bill Foster.

Even though Giannoulias was not endorsed by President Obama in the primary and the Obama White House attempted to recruit a different candidate for the race, he was elected the Democratic nominee for US Senate in Illinois in the February 2, 2010 primary, with 38.9% of the vote. David H. Hoffman received 33.7% and Cheryle Jackson received 19.8%.

Giannoulias was endorsed by Planned Parenthood, the Service Employees International Union (SEIU), AFSCME, the AFL–CIO, the League of Conservation Voters, the Human Rights Campaign, the Chicago Sun-Times, and the Sierra Club (Planned Parenthood, the League of Conservation Voters, and the Human Rights Campaign had all supported Rep. Mark Kirk, Giannoulias' Republican opponent, in previous races).

On May 28, 2010, the Human Rights Campaign (HRC) endorsed Giannoulias, calling him "a strident supporter of LGBT equality – including supporting marriage equality, repeal of the Defense of Marriage Act, repeal of "Don't Ask, Don't Tell" and supporting an inclusive Employment Non-Discrimination Act."

Among his early endorsers were James Houlihan and Manny Flores. U.S. Senator Dick Durbin, the Majority Whip and second-highest ranking Democrat in the Senate, endorsed Giannoulias and served as the chairman of the Giannoulias campaign.

During Giannoulias' bid for the Senate, he faced attacks on his credibility, mostly stemming from his connection to his family-owned bank. Broadway bank was shuttered and seized by the federal government and was alleged to have ties to the mafia. Kirk faced his own slew of controversies regarding his military service.

On November 2, 2010, Kirk defeated Giannoulias 48% to 46%.

== Chicago Public Library Board ==
On June 26, 2018, Giannoulias was confirmed to the Chicago Public Library Board, marking his first return to public service since leaving the Treasurer's office.

== Illinois Secretary of State ==
=== 2022 election ===
Giannoulias announced he would run for Illinois Secretary of State to succeed retiring incumbent Jesse White. During the Democratic primary, his opponent, Chicago City Clerk Anna Valencia, criticized Giannoulias for his past support of a Republican candidate who supported anti-abortion legislation. On June 28, 2022, he won the Democratic primary. On November 8, 2022, Giannoulias won the general election, defeating Republican Dan Brady.

=== 2026 election ===
In March 2026, Giannoulias won the Democratic nomination for re-election unopposed.

=== Tenure ===
Giannoulias was sworn-in as the 38th Illinois secretary of state on January 9, 2023. In one of his first acts as secretary of state, he pushed to modernize services and technologies used in departments and DMVs. In his first report, he stated he would focus on improving driver services facilities, ethics and office policies, and technology enhancements while also advocating RevUpIllinois, a website run through the secretary of state’s office that allows residents to submit a survey on the office's performance.

In March 2023, amid growing book bans in the United States, Giannoulias drafted the "first-in-the-nation" legislation designed to support public and school libraries and librarians by prohibiting book banning in the state. In June 2023, the legislation passed with Governor JB Pritzker signing it, making Illinois the first state in the country to outlaw book bans.

In April 2024, Giannoulias drafted legislation that would require lobbyists to disclose how much they are paid by each of their clients. Lobbyists in state have been required to report how much they spend dining and entertaining lawmakers. However, there is no law requiring lobbyists to disclose how much they are paid by corporations, industry groups or other special interest organizations. The drafted legislation would give the office of secretary of state more power to enforce ethics laws.

Between 2023 and 2024, Giannoulias oversaw the Illinois flag redesign contest, in an effort to see if the state flag should remain the same or have a new design. On March 6, 2025, Giannoulias announced on social media the results of the flag vote. The current flag received 43% of the votes (165,602 votes), while 57% of the votes were distributed among the remaining 12 designs, none of which exceeded 10%. Giannoulias commented: "Some may call it an SOB—a seal on a bedsheet—and the vexillological community may hate it, but people overwhelmingly prefer our current state flag".

In January 2025, amid President Donald Trump's vow to increase mass deportations and U.S. Immigration and Customs Enforcement presence, Giannoulias issued a memo to DMV employees in Illinois that they are not permitted to release information to ICE officials or Border Patrol agents unless they have a court order, judicial warrant or subpoena for individual records. In November 2025, Giannoulias launched the state's Mobile ID program in which iPhone users could add and present their Illinois driver’s license or state ID in Apple Wallet.

== 2027 Chicago mayoral campaign ==
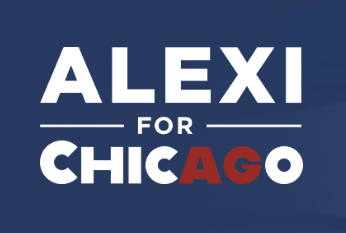
Giannoulias's 2027 mayoral campaign logo

Since early 2026, Giannoulias was seen as a potential challenger against incumbent Mayor Brandon Johnson in the 2027 election. In February 2026, The Chicago Sun-Times reported that Giannoulias was interested in running for mayor. In April 2026, despite not announcing his intention to run, Giannoulias had raised $18.3 million through his political action committee that could be used for a mayoral bid, dwarfing the $813,000 raised by Johnson. In May 2026, Giannoulias stated that he was focused on the 2026 legislative session and his 2026 re-election campaign. A month later in June during a press conference at Lurie Children's Hospital, Giannoulias said that he was "encouraged" by the support for a potential mayoral run.

On August 2, Giannoulias announced his candidacy for mayor during a campaign rally in the Bronzeville neighborhood of the city. His campaign was endorsed by five members of the city council: Felix Cardona Jr., Michelle A. Harris, Brian K. Hopkins, Timmy Knudsen and Emma Mitts. Local chapters of several unions such as the Central Midwest Regional Council of Carpenters, International Brotherhood of Electrical Workers, International Union of Operating Engineers, and Laborers' International Union of North America attended his campaign launch event. By September 2026, when Johnson announced his own re-election bid, Giannoulias was considered the front-runner in the race with a financial advantage having raised $22 million for his campaign fund.

== Personal life ==
Giannoulias married Jo Terlato in 2014 at St. Andrew Greek Orthodox Church in Chicago. Giannoulias is Greek Orthodox. They have four children.

Party political offices
Preceded by Tom Dart	Democratic nominee for Treasurer of Illinois; 2006	Succeeded by Robin Kelly
Preceded by Barack Obama	Democratic nominee for U.S. Senator from Illinois (Class 3); 2010	Succeeded by Tammy Duckworth
Preceded by Jesse White	Democratic nominee for Secretary of State of Illinois; 2022, 2026	Most recent
Political offices
Preceded by Judy Baar Topinka	Treasurer of Illinois; 2007–2011	Succeeded by Dan Rutherford
Preceded by Jesse White	Secretary of State of Illinois; 2023–present	Incumbent
