= David H. Hoffman =

American prosecutor (born 1967)

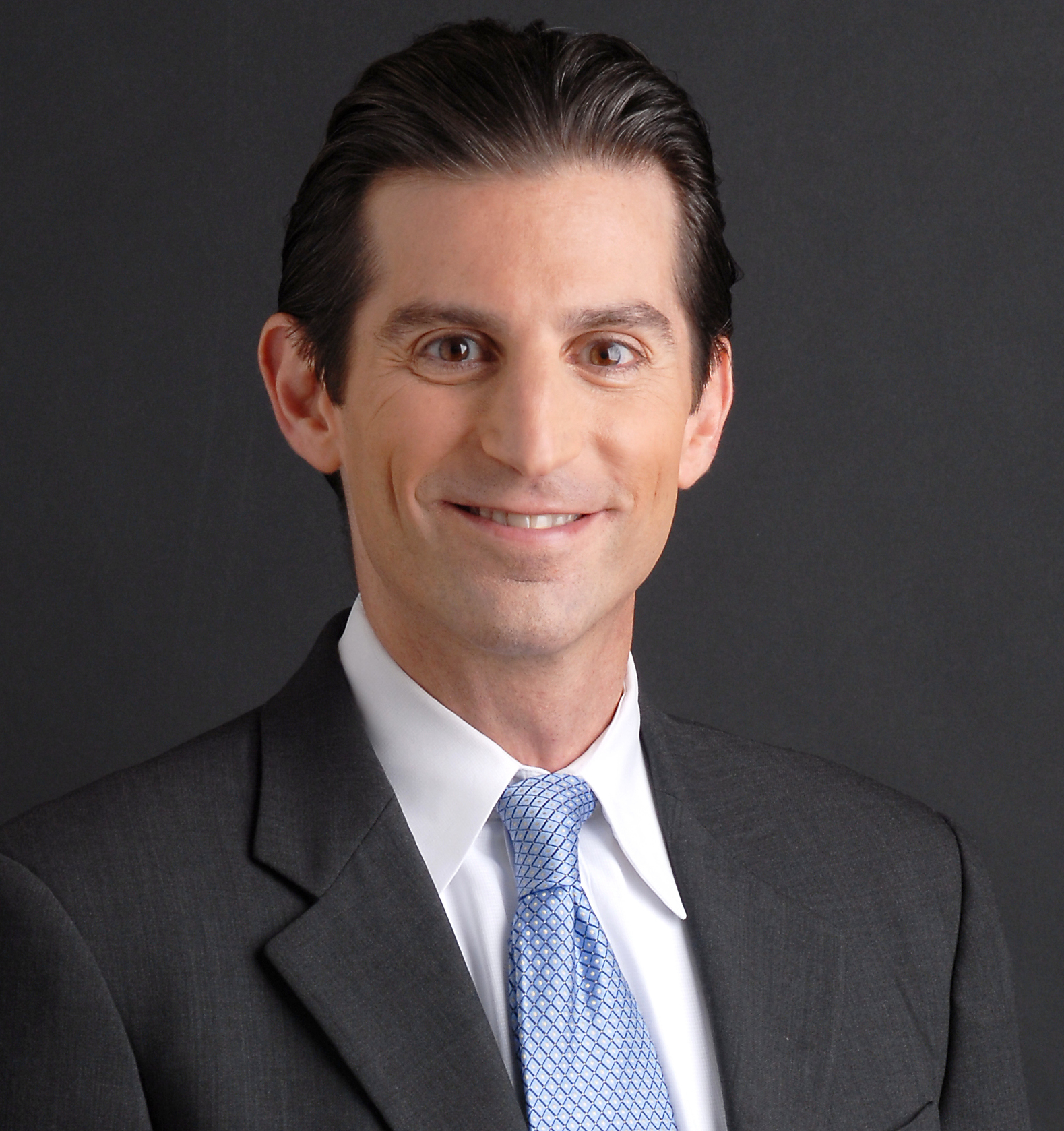
- Hoffman in 2010

2nd Inspector General of Chicago
- In office October 2005 – August 27, 2009
- Preceded by: Alexander Vroustouris
- Succeeded by: Joseph Ferguson

Personal details
- Born: May 22, 1967 (age 59) Chicago, Illinois, U.S.
- Party: Democratic
- Spouse: Monique Hoffman
- Children: 2
- Education: Yale University (BA); University of Chicago (JD)

David H. Hoffman (born May 22, 1967) is a former federal prosecutor and was Chicago's inspector general. Hoffman ran for the Illinois seat of the U.S. Senate in 2010 but lost to Alexi Giannoulias in the Democratic primary.

== Early and personal life ==
Hoffman was raised in northern suburban Chicago by parents of Jewish and Puerto Rican descent. They have two children, two dogs, and two cats. The Hoffmans are avid Chicago sports fans. Hoffman is an adjunct professor at the University of Chicago Law School, where he teaches public corruption and the law.

== Congressman Boren's Office ==
After graduating from Yale, Hoffman spent three years working on Capitol Hill, where he served as press secretary and legislative assistant for foreign policy to U.S. Congressman David Boren (D-OK).

== Clerkships ==
After his graduation from Law School, Hoffman served as a law clerk for Judge Dennis G. Jacobs, Hoffman also clerked for Supreme Court Chief Justice William Rehnquist. Hoffman, in response to questions about his experience clerking for conservative jurists has been quoted as saying, “If you’re lucky enough in Law School to be in a position to apply for a supreme court clerkship what the law professors will tell you is that you apply to all nine. Because it’s really an honor to clerk on the Supreme Court no matter who you clerk for. And you really can’t tell anything about someone’s ideology by who they clerk for… Judge Richard Posner, on the Appellate Court, who’s widely considered a conservative judge. He clerked for Justice Brennan, one of the great liberal Justices".

== Chicago Inspector General ==
The Chicago Tribune Editorial Board described Hoffman in the following way, “Since 2005, Chicago has had a truly independent Inspector General”.

== 2010 Candidacy for US Senate ==
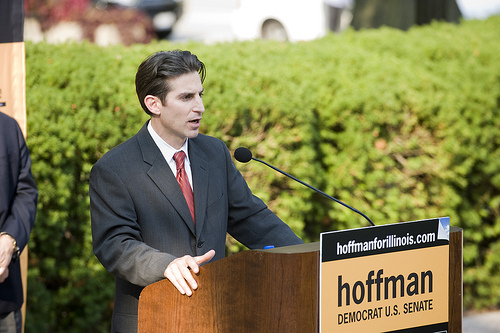
Hoffman announces his candidacy for U.S. Senate in 2010

In 2009, Hoffman announced his intentions to run for the United States Senate seat held by Roland Burris after Burris, who was appointed by then Governor Rod Blagojevich to fill the seat vacated by Barack Obama following Obama's election as President of the United States, announced he would not seek election to a full term. He was endorsed by every major newspaper in the state with the Chicago Tribune calling him "an incorruptible man who tells truth to power." On February 2, 2010, Hoffman was defeated in the Democratic primary by state treasurer Alexi Giannoulias.

== See also ==
- List of law clerks for the chief justice of the United States
