= Our America =

2002 American television film

- Based on: Our America: Life And Death on the South Side of Chicago by LeAlan Jones, Lloyd Newman, and David Isay
- Written by: Gordon Rayfield
- Directed by: Ernest Dickerson
- Music by: Patrice Rushen
- Country of origin: United States
- Original language: English

Production
- Producer: Eda Godel Hallinan
- Cinematography: Ernest Dickerson
- Editor: Stephen Lovejoy
- Running time: 95
- Production company: Come Sunday Productions

Original release
- Network: Showtime
- Release: July 28, 2002

Our America is a film based on the book by LeAlan Jones and Lloyd Newman, Our America: Life And Death on the South Side of Chicago that tells the story of the first 4 years of Ghetto Life 101, an Award Winning NPR Documentary Series of real life stories in South Side, Chicago, they created.

It premiered at the 2002 Sundance Film Festival, and aired on American television later that year.

This was the last performance of Brandon Hammond before his retirement from acting.

The film is Dedicated to Eric Morse, a 5 Year-Old Boy who was murdered in the Ida B. Wells Homes eight years earlier in 1994.

== Cast ==
- Josh Charles as Dave Isay
- Brandon Hammond as Lloyd "Boo" Newman
- Serena Lee as Janelle Jones
- Roderick Pannell as LeAlan Jones
- Irma P. Hall as June Jones
- Peter Paige as Gary Covino
- Vanessa Williams as Sandra Williams
- Mykelti Williamson as Graham Ellis
- Rukiya Bernard as Sophie Newman
- Mark Taylor as Duane
- K. C. Collins as James
- Neil Crone as Paxton Wade
- Jordan Duncan as Eric Morse
- Jordan Francis as Derrick Morse
- Maxine Guess as Mrs. Shaw
- Gene Mack as "Stick" Newman
- Daniel Anthony Farris as Elvin

== Award ==
Daytime Emmy Awards

- 2003 – Outstanding Single Camera Photography (Film or Electronic) (won)
