= Public Access (2026 film) =

2026 documentary film by David Shadrack Smith

- Directed by: David Shadrack Smith
- Produced by: Sara Crow; Anne-Marcelle Ngabirano
- Edited by: Geoff Gruetzmacher
- Music by: Adore
- Production company: Part2 Pictures
- Release date: January 23, 2026 (Sundance)
- Running time: 108 minutes
- Country: United States
- Language: English

Public Access is a 2026 American documentary film directed by David Shadrack Smith in his feature directorial debut. The film chronicles the chaotic and influential history of public-access television in New York City during the 1970s and 80s.

It is executive produced by Steve Buscemi, Benny Safdie, and Wren Arthur. The film premiered in the U.S. Documentary Competition at the 2026 Sundance Film Festival.

== Premise ==
The film explores the "media experiment" of Manhattan Cable Television, which opened its airwaves to the public with zero editorial oversight long before the internet or social media existed. It mainly features rare archival footage of underground creators (alongside audio only interviews) who used this free-speech platform to create shows ranging from the interactive Grube Tube and the pioneering LGBT series The Emerald City to Glenn O'Brien's counterculture variety show TV Party. The documentary also covers the legal battles that ensued when sexually explicit programming tested the limits of the First Amendment.

== Production ==
The film is directed by David Shadrack Smith, the founder of Part2 Pictures, marking his debut as a feature documentary director. It is produced by Sara Crow and Anne-Marcelle Ngabirano.

High-profile filmmakers Steve Buscemi and Benny Safdie serve as executive producers alongside Wren Arthur. The project highlights a pre-internet era where ordinary citizens could hijack television screens, presaging the modern landscape of influencers and content creators.

== Release ==
Public Access was announced as part of the U.S. Documentary Competition at the 2026 Sundance Film Festival on December 10, 2025.

== Reception ==
On the review aggregator website Rotten Tomatoes, 63% of 16 critics' reviews are positive, with an average rating of 6/10.

Daniel Fienberg of The Hollywood Reporter wrote, "There are good and righteous thoughts in Public Access and I think the points it wants to make get through if you work at it, but man the journey to get there is chaotic."

Rolling Stone film critic David Fear put this film on his list of the 12 Best Movies that played at Sundance 2026.
