= Our America with Lisa Ling =

- Genre: Documentary
- Presented by: Lisa Ling
- Country of origin: United States
- Original language: English
- No. of seasons: 5
- No. of episodes: 44

Production
- Executive producers: Amy Bucher; David Shadrack Smith; Lisa Ling
- Running time: 45 minutes
- Production company: Part2 Pictures

Original release
- Network: Oprah Winfrey Network
- Release: February 5, 2011 – July 31, 2014

Related
- This is Life with Lisa Ling

Our America with Lisa Ling is an American documentary television series that aired on the Oprah Winfrey Network for five seasons from February 15, 2011 until July 31, 2014. Hosted by journalist Lisa Ling, each episode examines an aspect of American society that may be viewed as marginal or outside the mainstream.

== Episodes ==
Season	Episodes	Originally released	
Season	Episodes	First released	Last released
1	7	February 15, 2011	March 29, 2011
2	8	October 16, 2011	December 4, 2011
3	10	June 10, 2012	August 21, 2012
4	9	January 22, 2013	March 12, 2013
5	10	May 29, 2014	July 31, 2014

=== Season 1 (2011) ===
Season 1 of Our America with Lisa Ling aired on Oprah Winfrey Network from Tuesday February 15, 2011 until Tuesday March 29, 2011. The first season was broadcast weekly on Tuesday nights at 10/9c.

No. overall	No. in season	Title	Original release date	U.S. viewers (millions)
1	1	"Faith Healers"	February 15, 2011	0.57
Ling visits a faith healing revival in Fort Mill, South Carolina, run by controversial evangelist Todd Bentley. During the visit, Ling says she's challenged by what she thought she knew about faith.
2	2	"Transgender Lives"	February 22, 2011	0.73
Five transgender people in various stages of transition are profiled.
3	3	"State of Sex Offenders"	March 1, 2011	N/A
Lisa Ling explores the lives of registered sex offenders with ex-cons in Florida. Ling also meets a real-estate agent who finds more substantial housing for offenders who can afford it and follows authorities as they arrest an ex-con accused of failing to register an address change.
4	4	"Pray the Gay Away?"	March 8, 2011	N/A
Lisa Ling explores that notion as she observes some 1100 participants at a Freedom Conference sponsored by the evangelical organization Exodus International, which offers advice on combating same-sex attractions.
5	5	"Online Brides"	March 15, 2011	N/A
A Texas man travels to Colombia to meet women who advertise for husbands at a marriage website.
6	6	"Heroin in the Heartland"	March 22, 2011	N/A
Lisa discusses the time she spent in a central Ohio town ravaged by heroin, and the connections that she made with the people along the way.
7	7	"A Closer Look"	March 29, 2011	N/A
Updates on the people and situations shown in previous episodes.

=== Season 2 (2011) ===
Season 2 of Our America with Lisa Ling aired on the Oprah Winfrey Network from Sunday October 16, 2011 until Sunday December 4, 2011. The second season was broadcast weekly on Sunday nights at 10/9c.

No. overall	No. in season	Title	Original release date	U.S. viewers (millions)
8	1	"Amateur Porn"	October 16, 2011	0.34
Lisa Ling begins Season 2 by exploring homemade sex films on the Internet, and how the widespread availability of online pornography has affected Americans' sex lives and relationships.
9	2	"Modern Polygamy"	October 23, 2011	0.52
A report on plural marriage in the U.S. focuses on the polygamous community in Centennial Park, Arizona.
10	3	"3 AM Girls"	October 30, 2011	0.54
Lisa explores sex trafficking in Washington, D.C.
11	4	"Invisible Wounds of War"	November 6, 2011	0.35
Exploring problems facing U.S. veterans returning from Iraq and Afghanistan. Host Lisa Ling visits a suicide hotline for veterans in New York City and a veterans' retreat in New Mexico.
12	5	"Twin Lives"	November 13, 2011	0.26
Human individuality is explored in a report on identical twins.
13	6	"Incarceration Generation"	November 20, 2011	0.32
Exploring the rate at which black men are incarcerated, and ways to reduce it.
14	7	"Extreme Parenting"	November 27, 2011	0.30
Lisa Ling explores the world of extreme parenting and discovers what these moms and dads have in common, they all believe their path is the best for their children.
15	8	"The Stories Continue..."	December 4, 2011	0.27
Updates on the people and situations shown this season.

=== Season 3 (2012) ===
Season 3 of Our America with Lisa Ling aired on the Oprah Winfrey Network from Sunday June 10, 2012 until Tuesday August 21, 2012. The third season was broadcast weekly on Tuesday nights at 10/9c.

No. overall	No. in season	Title	Original release date	U.S. viewers (millions)
16	1	"Sparkle Babies"	June 10, 2012	0.42
Lisa Ling reports on child beauty pageants and the effects they have had on American families.
17	2	"Brides of Christ"	June 19, 2012	0.39
Lisa Ling meets nuns and sisters of all ages who continue to pledge their lives to God, and she discovers what draws them to religious life.
18	3	"Teen Mom Nation"	June 26, 2012	0.35
Lisa Ling explores the powerful efforts to stop children from having children and stories of teenage freedom lost to the cycle of teen pregnancy.
19	4	"Life on the Rez"	July 10, 2012	N/A
Lisa Ling meets the people who are seeking both modern and traditional solutions to give the next generation of Native Americans a fighting chance at a brighter future.
20	5	"Holy Matrimonies"	July 17, 2012	0.45
Lisa Ling explores this ancient approach to love in modern America.
21	6	"Lost American Dream"	July 24, 2012	0.36
Lisa Ling travels the country to meet those forced by the aftershocks of the economic crisis to downsize their lives and reassess the American Dream.
22	7	"Labeled for Life"	August 7, 2012	0.45
Lisa Ling investigates the case of a teenage boy who was sentenced to 16 years in prison for touching a girl's breast — and is now a registered sex offender.
23	8	"Innocent Behind Bars?"	August 14, 2012	0.37
Lisa Ling explores the lives of men who were wrongly convicted, and one man on death row whose daughter is fighting for the truth.
24	9	"Pray the Gay Away: Revisited"	August 21, 2012	0.38
This episode revisits the topic of Gay conversion therapy plus an interview with the leader of Exodus International, Alan Chambers, who credits Our America with changing his mind.
25	10	"Swingers Next Door"	August 21, 2012	0.40
Lisa crosses the country to explore what's at stake with this non-traditional yet growing phenomenon surrounding Swingers.

=== Season 4 (2013) ===
Season 4 of Our America with Lisa Ling aired on the Oprah Winfrey Network from Tuesday January 22, 2013 until Tuesday March 12, 2013. The fourth season was broadcast weekly on Tuesday nights at 10/9c.

No. overall	No. in season	Title	Original release date	U.S. viewers (millions)
26	1	"Shades of Kink"	January 22, 2013	0.58
Lisa Ling goes beyond Fifty Shades of Grey to explore the real world of BDSM: bondage and discipline, dominance and submission, and sado-masochism.
27	2	"Generation XXL"	January 29, 2013	0.40
In a report about childhood obesity, Lisa Ling meets families who are struggling to help their children lose weight in order to survive.
28	3	"The Secret Lives of Seniors"	February 5, 2013	0.31
Ling tries to help her own father navigate the challenges of aging while also exploring a graying American population who are speed dating, having sex and breaking track records, among other things.
29	4	"3AM Girls: One Year Later"	February 12, 2013	0.42
In an episode update, Ling returns to the streets of Washington, D.C. to see how two young women who were caught up in the shadowy underworld of domestic human sex trafficking are faring, and to catch up with the crusaders who risked their lives to secure their safety.
30	5	"Martyrs for Christ?"	February 19, 2013	0.36
Lisa goes inside a new religious movement where members literally hear the voice of God, proclaiming a radical message of spiritual warfare and martyrdom.
31	6	"A Predator in the Clubhouse"	February 26, 2013	0.50
Lisa Ling explores two stories of stolen innocence and the pattern of inaction that continues to compromise our children's safety.
32	7	"I Love You & You... & You"	March 5, 2013	0.37
Polyamorous couples are committed to non-monogamy. Lisa visits three polyamorous households – each of them pushing the limits of love, commitment, and family.
33	8	"Families of Killers"	March 12, 2013	0.56
Lisa Ling meets family members whose closest relatives have committed unthinkable crimes, and asks what the concept of family means in the face of these actions.
34	9	"Special Report: God and Gays"	June 20, 2013	0.40
In this special, Lisa Ling joins "ex-gay" organization Exodus International president Alan Chambers and a group of reparative therapy survivors as they engage in a face-to-face confrontation 40 years in the making.

=== Season 5 (2014) ===
The fifth and final season of Our America with Lisa Ling premiered on OWN on May 29, 2014.

No. overall	No. in season	Title	Original release date	U.S. viewers (millions)
35	1	"Fighting Satan"	May 29, 2014	N/A
Lisa Ling investigates the belief in the Devil and explores how this relates to modern religious practices.
36	2	"Transgender Lives: 3 Years Later"	June 5, 2014	N/A
Ling reconnects with four transgender individuals, who she interviewed three years ago on Our America.
37	3	"The ADHD Explosion"	June 12, 2014	N/A
Lisa explores ADHD, and interviews three families in diagnosis and treatment.
38	4	"Criminal Informants"	June 19, 2014	N/A
Ling investigates the world of criminal informants.
39	5	"Black America's Silent Epidemic"	June 26, 2014	N/A
Lisa examines the HIV rate in the African American community.
40	6	"Children of the System"	July 3, 2014	N/A
Ling discusses children in the L.A. foster care system.
41	7	"Under the Gun"	July 10, 2014	N/A
Lisa investigates violence in Philadelphia.
42	8	"Labeled for Life: 18 Months Later"	July 17, 2014	N/A
Ling revisits a man who is paroled after being labeled a sex offender.
43	9	"Teen Mom Nation: 2 Years Later"	July 24, 2014	N/A
Lisa provides an update on teen moms from season two.
44	10	"The Missing"	July 31, 2014	N/A
In the series finale, Lisa Ling visits those with missing loved ones.

== Critical response ==
Hank Stuever of The Washington Post praised the series, calling it "an intelligent, ruminative affirmation on the ways life might resemble a daytime talk show". Ling is called empathetic and sensitive and the series a throwback to "the quality TV magazine journalism that predated the infotainment glut". However he finds that while Ling is emotionally affected by the stories she finds she seems "none the wiser" for having found them.

== Ratings ==
The debut episode of Our America drew an average of 574,000 viewers. This was an improvement over the average viewership that the network attracted during its first week on the air and an improvement of 242% over its predecessor, Discovery Health Channel, from a year earlier.

In its second season, Our America continued with strong ratings, ranking #17 in its time period among 95 ad-supported cable networks. The show posted triple digit growth for the month of October across the key demos versus year ago numbers (+189% W25-54, +108% HH, +126% P2+, compared with Discovery Health's ratings in October 2010).
