= The Gregory Hines Show =

American sitcom

- Genre: Sitcom
- Created by: Nat Bernstein; Mitchel Katlin
- Written by: Elaine Aronson; Michael Carrington; Lance Crouther; Ron Darian; Sy Dukane; Michael Feldman; Elin Hampton; Ali LeRoi; Denise Moss; Alex Reid; Kriss Turner
- Directed by: Bob Delegall; Andrew D. Weyman
- Starring: Gregory Hines; Wendell Pierce; Robin Riker; Brandon Hammond; Mark Tymchyshyn; Judith Shelton; Bill Cobbs
- Theme music composer: Rick Cutler
- Composer: Gregory Hines
- Country of origin: United States
- Original language: English
- No. of seasons: 1
- No. of episodes: 22 (7 unaired)

Production
- Executive producers: Elaine Aronson; Nat Bernstein; Sy Dukane; Mitchel Katlin; Denise Moss; Fran Saperstein; Gregory Hines
- Producers: Michael Carrington; Ron Darian; Al Lowenstein; Kriss Turner; Andrew D. Weyman
- Running time: 26 minutes
- Production companies: Katlin/Bernstein Productions; Darric Productions; CBS Productions; Columbia TriStar Television

Original release
- Network: CBS
- Release: September 15, 1997 – February 27, 1998

The Gregory Hines Show is an American television sitcom that aired on CBS. The series premiered on Monday, September 15, 1997, before airing on September 19, 1997, as a part of the network's Block Party Friday night lineup. It ended its run on February 27, 1998, with 15 episodes aired out of the 22 that were produced.

== Background ==
The Gregory Hines Show was the only show on the Block Party lineup that was not produced by Warner Bros. Television or Miller-Boyett Productions. Compared to the Miller-Boyett series, The Gregory Hines Show was markedly more mature in its themes; Leslie Moonves, incoming head of CBS at the time, described the inclusion of the show in the block as an effort to target the whole family, and executives at Miller-Boyett were fully pleased to have the show in the block, as TGIF, the block for which they had previously produced shows for the ABC network, was quickly shifting into a teen-oriented block that did not fit their style.

== Premise ==
The series starred Gregory Hines as Ben Stevenson, a publishing agent and widower raising 12-year-old son Matty (Brandon Hammond) in Chicago. A year and a half after his wife's death, Ben decides to resume his social life and begin dating again. He soon realizes that he has a lot to re-learn about women, just as his son is learning about them for the first time. Ben and Matty had previously had no trouble talking about anything, but now even the simplest conversation has become complicated, especially when the topic is the women in their lives. Now and then Ben receives advice from his brother Carl (Wendell Pierce), his widowed father James (Bill Cobbs), as well as his co-worker Alex (Mark Tymchyshyn), Alex's ex-wife, Nicole (Robin Riker) and his assistant Angela (Judith Shelton).

== Cast ==
- Gregory Hines as Ben Stevenson
- Wendell Pierce as Carl Stevenson, Ben's younger brother
- Robin Riker as Nicole Moran, Ben's co-worker
- Brandon Hammond as Matthew "Matty" Stevenson, Ben's son
- Mark Tymchyshyn as Alex Butler, Ben's other co-worker and Nicole's former husband
- Judith Shelton as Angela Rice, Ben's assistant
- Bill Cobbs as James Stevenson, Ben's widowed father

== Episodes ==
No.	Title	Directed by	Written by	Original release date	Viewers (millions)
1	"Pilot"	Andrew D. Weyman	Mitchel Katlin & Nat Bernstein	September 15, 1997	14.14
2	"Basketball Jones"	Andrew D. Weyman	Michael Feldman	September 19, 1997	7.79
3	"Flirting with Disaster"	Andrew D. Weyman	Elaine Aronson	September 26, 1997	8.66
4	"Epilogue to a Kiss"	Andrew D. Weyman	Kriss Turner	October 3, 1997	8.41
5	"Boys' Night In"	Andrew D. Weyman	Alan Kirschenbaum	October 10, 1997	7.77
6	"Catcher on the Train"	Unknown	Unknown	October 17, 1997	8.20
7	"Sofa, So Good"	Andrew D. Weyman	Michael Carrington	October 24, 1997	7.44
8	"Eight and a Half Months"	Andrew D. Weyman	Denise Moss & Sy Dukane	October 31, 1997	7.48
9	"The Man Called Uncle"	Unknown	Unknown	November 14, 1997	8.18
10	"Three's Not Company"	Andrew D. Weyman	Kriss Turner	December 15, 1997	11.01
11	"To Volunteer is Human"	Bob Delegall	Michael Feldman	January 9, 1998	9.80
12	"Love Thy Neighbor"	Andrew D. Weyman	Michael Carrington	January 16, 1998	10.01
13	"James Stevenson Stands Alone"	Unknown	Unknown	January 23, 1998	9.12
14	"Carpe Diem"	Unknown	Unknown	January 30, 1998	8.86
15	"Per Chance to Dance"	Unknown	Unknown	February 27, 1998	6.63
16	"Wahunthra"	Andrew D. Weyman	Sy Dukane & Denise Moss	September 17, 2023	N/A
17	"Get Smarter"	N/A	N/A	Unaired	N/A
18	"Anita the Hun"	N/A	N/A	Unaired	N/A
19	"Sister-in-Law, Sister-in-Law"	Andrew D. Weyman	Elaine Aronson	October 13, 2023	N/A
20	"Mug the One You're With"	Andrew D. Weyman	Sy Dukane & Denise Moss	September 24, 2023	N/A
21	"Ben-Her"	Bob Delegall	Story by : Elaine Aronson; Teleplay by : Alex Reid	December 17, 2021	N/A
22	"I'll See You All in Health"	N/A	N/A	Unaired	N/A
