= Pray the Gay Away? =

- Our America with Lisa Ling episode
- Episode no.: Season 1 Episode 4
- Original air date: March 8, 2011
- Running time: 42 minutes

Episode chronology
← Previous "State of Sex Offenders"	Next → "Online Brides"

"Pray the Gay Away?" is a 2011 episode of the American television series Our America with Lisa Ling. The episode, hosted by Ling, profiles several people as they seek to reconcile their homosexuality with their Christianity. It originally aired on OWN: Oprah Winfrey Network on March 8, 2011.

Speaking for those who believe that Christianity and homosexuality are incompatible was Alan Chambers, president of Exodus International, an ex-gay organization. Also interviewed were Janet Boynes, a woman who states she "walked away" from lesbianism eleven years earlier and who now runs her own ex-gay ministry, a man named Christian whom Janet has been counseling for the last four years and another man named Ethan, whom Ling met at an Exodus conference. Each of the men acknowledged that they still had feelings of attraction to the same sex. Only Boynes said she had no such feelings.

Ling also interviewed several people who had reconciled their sexuality and their faith. Among them was Michael Bussee, who had co-founded Exodus International in 1976 only to leave the group in 1979 when he found himself falling in love with another male founding member. Ling spotlighted The Naming Project, a summer camp program for gay and questioning Christian young people. Gay Lutheran and Naming Project co-founder Jay Wiesner was interviewed along with campers Chelsea, who went from being a closeted cheerleader to an openly lesbian prom queen, and Julian, who had been fired as a counselor-in-training at a Christian camp just two weeks before filming when his homosexuality was discovered.

Ling's examination of these two "paths" led her to conclude, "I'm not sure which path is more difficult, but while they couldn't be more different, I think they're both traveling in the same direction."

Following the broadcast, Gayle King hosted Ling for a one-hour live program called "Pray the Gay Away? The Conversation Continues" featuring follow-up interviews with some of the participants and telephone calls from the public. Also appearing was Rashad Robinson from the Gay & Lesbian Alliance Against Defamation (GLAAD) who questioned Ling's decision not to place the individual stories she reported into the larger context of anti-gay discrimination in the United States and psychologist Andrea Macåri who noted that there is no reputable medical evidence that sexual orientation can be changed.

== Critical response ==
GLAAD Media Strategist Justin Ward criticized "Pray the Gay Away?" for asking "a question that's already been answered". Noting that it has been almost 40 years since the American Psychological Association concluded that homosexuality is not a disorder, Ward called OWN "irresponsible" for broadcasting a program that he said had the potential to do harm to young people who may be enduring bullying and harassment for being gay. Ling, he added, should have included more information on the Christian denominations that accept LGBT people and that literal interpretation is only one of many ways to interpret the Bible.

Wayne Besen, founder of Truth Wins Out and a vocal critic of the ex-gay movement, faulted "Pray the Gay Away?" and Ling for an apparent lack of research into Exodus. He noted in particular the statement that "Exodus no longer promises to make you straight", which he disputed, and the failure to note that Janet Boynes is listed as a resource on Exodus's website. Besen called on OWN to refrain from re-broadcasting the episode.

A reviewer for gay-interest website AfterElton.com took Ling to task for presenting the ex-gay movement and the gay people of faith movement as morally equivalent. Noting a quote of Ling's from an earlier episode of Our America in which she deplores the manipulation of peoples' faith, he expressed disappointment at Ling's failure to expose the manipulations perpetrated by Exodus. Conversely, a reviewer for AfterElton's sister site, the lesbian-interest AfterEllen.com, called the episode "balanced and moving". Finding the episode to be less of a full exploration of the subject and more of a starting point for dialogue, she hoped that Ling would revisit the topic in a future episode and focus on whether sexual orientation is biologically based or behavioural.

== Follow-up ==
On August 21, 2012, OWN aired a follow-up to "Pray the Gay Away?" entitled "Pray the Gay Away? — Breaking News". In it, Ling interviews Alan Chambers again about supposed changes in both his positions and the stances of Exodus International on the ex-gay subject. She also catches up with Christian, whom Ling describes as having "lost a little bit of light in his eyes".

OWN aired a third, special episode of Our America on June 20, 2013. Entitled "God & Gays", it featured a meeting between Alan Chambers and several "ex-gay survivors" in which Chambers issued an apology for the pain they experienced from trying to change their sexual orientation. Christian attended the meeting and in an interview explains that he has "come out, quietly, to [him]self" and that he is hopeful about building a community of like-minded people. Chambers expressed uncertainty about his own future and the future of Exodus International. The special aired one day after Exodus announced that it was disbanding.
