= Murder of Eric Morse =

1994 child murder in Chicago, Illinois, US

Eric Morse
- Born: c. 1989; United States
- Died: October 13, 1994 (age 5); Chicago, Illinois, United States
- Cause of death: Head injuries
- Known for: Being the victim of child murder

Eric Morse (c. 1989 – October 13, 1994) was a five-year-old African-American boy from Chicago, Illinois, who was murdered in October 1994. Morse was dropped from a high-rise building in the Ida B. Wells Homes by ten-year-old Jesse Rankins and 11-year-old Tykeece Johnson. Morse's murder was notable for the young ages of the victim and the killers, and brought further national attention to the plight of children in Chicago's housing projects. Rankins and Johnson, both minors at the time, were convicted for the murder of Morse and sentenced to five years' imprisonment each.

== Murder ==
On October 13, 1994, two of five-year-old Eric Morse's schoolmates, Jesse Rankins (aged ten years old) and Tykeece Johnson (aged 11), had asked him to steal candy from a store, but Morse refused. At around 6-7 P.M. (CDT) that day, Rankins and Johnson took Morse and his eight-year-old brother Derrick Lemon to a vacant apartment on the 14th floor of a high-rise building in the Ida B. Wells Homes, a housing project in Chicago's South Side. Rankins and Johnson dangled Morse out of a window of the apartment, resisting attempts by Lemon to intervene, and then dropped him. Morse suffered massive head injuries and was pronounced dead on arrival at the hospital.

== Aftermath ==
=== Conviction and sentencing ===
The Illinois legislature enacted a law permitting 10-year-old children to be sentenced to prison. Rankins and Johnson were convicted of first-degree murder and were sentenced to the maximum term of five years. Rankins served an additional nine years for sexually assaulting another inmate during a gang attack. After their initial releases, both men returned to prison repeatedly for other offenses.

Derrick Lemon, Morse's older brother who struggled to save Eric in the moments before he was dropped, received a lawsuit settlement in Eric's death for more than $1 million from the Chicago Housing Authority and a private management company. Lemon himself is now currently serving a 71-year murder sentence for the fatal shooting of his aunt's boyfriend at a barbecue in 2006.

=== Public reaction ===
Morse's death was cited nationally in speeches by politicians including President Bill Clinton and then-Speaker of the House Newt Gingrich. Henry Cisneros, then Secretary of Housing and Urban Development, called it a clinching fact in the federal government's decision to take over the troubled Chicago Housing Authority.

== Legacy ==
Local teenagers LeAlan Jones and Lloyd Newman began reporting on the case shortly after it occurred and created the radio documentary Remorse: The 14 Stories of Eric Morse produced by Dave Isay in 1994, which premiered in NPR and received the Robert F. Kennedy Journalism Award as well as a Peabody Award in 1995. The 2002 Showtime TV Movie Our America which is based on a book written by Jones and Newman is dedicated to Eric Morse, and also depicts his death.

== See also ==
- List of homicides in Illinois
- Robert Sandifer, 11-year-old murdered in Chicago a month before Morse
- Dantrell Davis, 7-year-old accidentally shot and killed in Chicago in 1992
