= Laura Ling =

American journalist (born 1976)

- Born: Laura G. Ling; December 1, 1976 (age 49); Carmichael, California, U.S.
- Education: University of California, Los Angeles (BA)
- Occupation: Journalist
- Notable credit(s): Channel One News, MTV, Current TV, E! Network
- Spouse: Iain Clayton
- Children: 2
- Relatives: Lisa Ling (sister)

Laura Ling (born December 1, 1976) is an American journalist and writer. She worked for Current TV as a correspondent and vice president of its Vanguard Journalism Unit, which produced the Vanguard TV series. She was the host and reporter on E! Investigates, a documentary series on the E! Network. In November 2014, Ling joined Discovery Digital Networks as its Director of Development.

In 2009, Ling and fellow journalist Euna Lee were detained in North Korea after they started filming refugees from the country who had crossed the river and entered China. Many of these refugees were women, and once across the border, they were often sold as brides. Ling said that the North Korean guards dragged her across the border. Once in North Korea the two women were tried and convicted. They were pardoned after former U.S. President Bill Clinton flew to North Korea to meet with Kim Jong-il and appeal on their behalf.

Ling and her older sister, Lisa Ling, are daughters of Hong Konger and Taiwanese immigrants. They grew up in Carmichael and Sacramento, California. Both became journalists and her sister became a correspondent for The Oprah Winfrey Show, National Geographic Explorer, CNN, and CBS News.

== Early life and education ==
Laura Ling was born in Carmichael, California. Her mother, Mary Mei-yan (née Wang), is a Taiwanese immigrant from Tainan, Taiwan. She formerly served as the head of the Los Angeles office of the Formosan Association for Public Affairs. Her father, Chung Teh "Douglas" Ling, is a Hong Konger immigrant from Hong Kong, where he was born in 1937. She has an older sister Lisa Ling who is a journalist.

Ling's parents divorced when she was four years old. Following the divorce, she and her sister were raised by their father in Sacramento, California.

Ling attended Del Campo High School in Fair Oaks, California. In 1998, Ling graduated with a communications degree from UCLA. At UCLA Ling served as a student analyst for the Center for Communication Policy. There, she worked on the Violence Assessment Project studying television programs.

== Career ==
She first worked as a correspondent for KCET's SoCal Connected and as a producer at Channel One News. She co-created Breaking it Down, a documentary series on MTV that aired between 1999 and 2001.

Next Ling joined Current TV, where she reported on issues about Cuba, Indonesia, the Philippines, Turkey, the West Bank, and the Amazon River, as well as about shantytowns in Sao Paulo, Brazil, gangs and homeless teens in Los Angeles, and underground churches in China. Prior to her detention, she had reported on the Mexican drug war.

When Ling was captured and detained, she was undercover, making a documentary about North Korean defectors, who were primarily women. She explored the dangers they faced after crossing the Chinese border at the Tumen River, including forced marriages and trafficking, deportation, and being criminalized.

Ling hosted a one-hour news show on E! Network, entitled E! Investigates, which premiered on December 8, 2010. The show targeted a younger audience and focused on pop culture. Her second show on E! was called Society X with Laura Ling, which aired on October 3, 2013. In addition, Ling hosted a nightly news program on KCET, which focused on local news in Los Angeles. Ling has also worked on projects for Nightline, NBC, PBS, and The WB (now The CW).

In 2015, Ling partnered with The ONE Campaign to make a documentary How Africa is Hacking Its Energy Crisis, which was posted on the Seeker Stories YouTube channel. Ling also created and reported on Rituals with Laura Ling, which was also posted to the Seeker Stories YouTube channel.

=== 2009 detention in North Korea ===
In the last week of March 2009, North Korea announced that two American journalists were detained and would be indicted and tried for illegally entering the country. The two journalists were Ling and Euna Lee; the pair had been attempting to film refugees and defectors along the border with China. In June 2009, after a show trial, they were sentenced to 12 years in a labor prison, for illegal entry into North Korea and unspecified hostile acts.

Ling later said that she had been compelled to make a false confession:

"I knew that that was the confession they wanted to hear and I was told if you confess there may be forgiveness and if you're not frank, if you don't confess, then the worst could happen."

The US government made diplomatic efforts to oppose this sentence before the women were released in August 2009.

Lisa Ling stated that when her sister and Lee left the United States, they never intended to cross into North Korea. She also said that her sister had required medical treatment for an ulcer.

In 2010, Ling co-wrote a memoir with her sister Lisa, Somewhere Inside: One Sister's Captivity in North Korea and the Other's Fight to Bring Her Home.

In South Korea, some human rights advocates, bloggers, and Christian pastors accused Ling and Lee of endangering North Korean refugees and the activists who help them. The journalists' notes and videotapes fell into the hands of North Korean authorities, potentially compromising the identities of refugees and activists dedicated to spiriting people out of the North. Both Ling and Lee addressed these allegations in their memoirs.

==== Release ====
In the efforts to negotiate Ling and Lee's release, diplomatic envoys were brought up as an option. Many different envoys were considered, including Governor of New Mexico Bill Richardson, former US President Jimmy Carter, US Secretary of State Hillary Clinton and former US President Bill Clinton. The latter was ultimately accepted as an envoy by the North Korean regime. Ling was pardoned along with Lee, and they returned to the United States following an unannounced visit to North Korea by Bill Clinton on August 4, 2009.

== Awards ==
Ling was named one of Glamour magazine's Women of the Year in 2009. In 2011, Ling received the McGill Medal for Journalistic Courage from the Grady College of Journalism and Mass Communication. In 2014, she won an Emmy Award and an Edward R. Murrow Award (Radio Television Digital News Association) for SoCal Connected. In 2012, Ling was inducted into the San Juan Education Foundation Hall of Fame. As the Director of Development and Correspondent for Discovery Digital Networks, Ling won a Gracie Award in 2016.

While she was the vice president of Vanguard, the show won several awards including a Peabody Award, two Emmy nominations, a Prism Award, and an Alfred I. duPont–Columbia University Award.

== Personal life ==
Laura Ling is married to Iain Clayton, a financial analyst. They have a daughter, Li Jefferson Clayton, born on June 3, 2010. She was named after Ling's sister, Lisa, and President Bill Clinton, whose middle name is Jefferson. They have a son, Kai Clayton, born on December 18, 2013.

== Published works ==
- Ling, Laura; Ling, Lisa (2010). Somewhere Inside: One Sister's Captivity in North Korea and the Other's Fight to Bring Her Home. William Morrow. ISBN 978-0062000675.

== See also ==
- List of Americans detained by North Korea
- Han Park
