= Part2 Pictures =

American film and television production company

Part2 Pictures is an American production company that launched in 2007 in Brooklyn, New York. It is known for projects including (U.S. TV channel) CNN’s This Is Life with Lisa Ling, Taste the Nation with Padma Lakshmi for Hulu, the series Belief with Oprah Winfrey for OWN, Discovery Channel’s Dixie Mafia, Engineering Ground Zero for PBS NOVA, and National Geographic Channel’s Hard Time.

== Past and current projects ==
Part2 Pictures produces documentary, feature film and lifestyle programming for broadcast and digital platforms. In addition to This is Life and Our America, both of which Lisa Ling hosted and co-produced, the company's credits include NOVA’s Engineering Ground Zero, and National Geographic’s Hard Time. It also produced a seven-part series with Oprah Winfrey exploring humankind's quest for spirituality titled Belief, which was released on the Oprah Winfrey Network in 2015. In addition, Part2 Pictures helped produce the feature films, I'll See You In My Dreams directed by Brett Haley, An Honest Liar directed by Justin Weinstein and Tyler Measom chronicling the life of The Amazing Randi, and The Redemption of General Butt Naked, a Sundance Award-winning documentary about the African warlord, Joshua Blahyi and directed by Eric Strauss and Daniele Anastasion. The company has also produced two seasons of Scene of the Crime with Tony Harris on Investigation Discovery.

In 2018, Part2 produced LL Cool J Presents: The Story of Cool for MSNBC, a three-part series interrogating the concept of cool in America, and Breaking Hate, a documentary about Christian Picciolini and his journey out of, and then against, the white power movement. The following year, Part2 made Chasing Life with Dr. Sanjay Gupta, a six-part series on creating a healthy and meaningful life for CNN. Part2 is also responsible for another Lisa Ling-hosted series, Take Out with Lisa Ling, aired on HBO Max.

Part2's more recent credits include Taste the Nation with Padma Lakshmi, which streams on Hulu, and America Outdoors with Baratunde Thurston on PBS. Taste the Nation is on its second full season, after a 4-part holiday seasonette, Taste the Nation: Holiday Edition, released in 2021.

== History and awards ==
David Shadrack Smith launched Part2 Pictures in his home state of New York in 2007. Since its inception, Part2 Pictures has produced more than 130 hours of programming and filmed in 35 countries. It has won two Emmy awards, five CINE awards, an IDA award for best documentary series, a Gracie award and a Sundance Jury prize. Taste the Nation with Padma Lakshmi won a James Beard Media award in the Visual Media — Long Form category for its 4-part Holiday Seasonette, filmed and aired during the COVID-19 pandemic.
