= This Is Life with Lisa Ling =

American documentary television series

- Created by: Part2 Pictures
- Presented by: Lisa Ling
- Composer: Mike Shinoda
- Country of origin: United States
- No. of seasons: 9
- No. of episodes: 68

Production
- Running time: 60 minutes

Original release
- Network: CNN
- Release: September 28, 2014 – December 18, 2022

Related
- Our America with Lisa Ling

This Is Life with Lisa Ling is a CNN original documentary television series produced by Brooklyn-based production company Part2 Pictures and American journalist Lisa Ling, who is also the show's host. The program's first season premiered on September 28, 2014, and its last season was in 2022.

== Summary ==
In the investigative docuseries, host Lisa Ling journeys to the far corners of America. The premiere episode features Ling investigating the world of "sugaring" and opening up about her relationship experience being a self-proclaimed sugar baby. Later in the first season, Ling delved into topics such as drug abuse in Utah's Mormon community, and the gay rodeo scene. The music for the first season was composed by Mike Shinoda of the band Linkin Park.

The series is a continuation of Ling's prior documentary series, Our America with Lisa Ling, which ran for five seasons until 2014 on OWN.

== Background ==
This Is Life was one of 12 anticipated nonfiction series to air on CNN, amid its typical daily newscasts, in 2015. The influx of these original primetime shows was part of a new initiative to "help CNN reduce its dependence on the network’s traditional format," according to a Variety article. Other nonfiction series that occupied primetime slots on CNN when her show debuted included Anthony Bourdain's Parts Unknown and a series featuring the Discovery Channel's Mike Rowe.

Celebrity writer Greg Gilman speculated that This is Life would be similar in concept to Lisa Ling's previous show, Our America. However, Ling told the Huffington Post that This is Life would be "edgier" and "much more in your face" than the last series, which aired on OWN.

== Episodes ==
=== Series overview ===
Season	Episodes	Originally released	
Season	Episodes	First released	Last released
1	8	September 28, 2014	November 16, 2014
2	8	September 30, 2015	December 13, 2015
3	8	September 25, 2016	November 27, 2016
4	8	October 1, 2017	November 26, 2017
5	8	September 23, 2018	November 18, 2018
6	8	September 29, 2019	November 17, 2019
7	6	November 29, 2020	December 20, 2020
8	8	October 10, 2021	November 28, 2021
9	6	November 27, 2022	December 18, 2022

=== Season 1 (2014) ===
No. overall	No. in season	Title	Original release date	US viewers (millions)
1	1	"Sugar Daddies, Sugar Babies"	September 28, 2014	0.59
"Relationships between wealthy older men and attractive young women."
2	2	"Unholy Addiction"	October 5, 2014	0.50
"Prescription-drug addiction in Utah is examined."
3	3	"The Genius Experiment"	October 12, 2014	0.60
"Genetic selection is the topic."
4	4	"Filthy Rich"	October 19, 2014	0.66
"The host examines the booming economy in western North Dakota."
5	5	"Jungle Fix"	October 26, 2014	N/A
"A hallucinogenic herbal tea is examined."
6	6	"Road Strip"	November 2, 2014	N/A
"A report on strippers who leave their home turf to travel to areas that are more lucrative."
7	7	"Gay Rodeo"	November 9, 2014	N/A
"An exploration of the Gay Rodeo Association."
8	8	"Called to the Collar"	November 16, 2014	N/A
"A report on a rural patch of land in the Midwest that is generating more Catholic priests per capita than any other place in the U.S."

=== Season 2 (2015) ===
No. overall	No. in season	Title	Original release date	US viewers (millions)
9	1	"Children of the Prophet"	September 30, 2015	0.72
"Two children of imprisoned Fundamentalist Latter-Day Saints prophet Warren Jeffs are interviewed."
10	2	"Inside Mongol Nation"	October 7, 2015	0.70
"Lisa examines the "one-percenter" Mongols Motorcycle Club."
11	3	"Fatherless Towns"	October 21, 2015	0.46
"Thirteen inmates in the Richmond jail prepare for a father-daughter dance."
12	4	"Faces That Sell"	October 28, 2015	0.44
"The world of fashion models is explored."
13	5	"Electronic Woodstock"	November 4, 2015	0.44
"Lisa relives her life as a 1990s raver by embedding with a new generation of electronic music fans at a festival called Mysteryland."
14	6	"America's Busiest Coroners"	November 11, 2015	0.59
"A visit to the Los Angeles County Coroner's Office."
15	7	"The Seduction Game"	December 9, 2015	0.66
"Lisa attends a pickup artist boot camp to explore what draws men to the pickup lifestyle and to discern what pickup masters are really teaching."
16	8	"The Satanist Next Door"	December 13, 2015	0.42
"Lisa visits with members of the Satanic Temple in Detroit."

=== Season 3 (2016) ===
No. overall	No. in season	Title	Original release date	US viewers (millions)
17	1	"Locked Angeles"	September 25, 2016	0.71
"Lisa Ling gains unprecedented access to the Los Angeles County Jail to understand what it takes to manage the country's busiest jail."
18	2	"Women Who Fight"	October 2, 2016	0.47
"Lisa steps into the cage with three female fighters who are turning the traditionally male sport of MMA on its head."
19	3	"The Black and White of Heroin"	October 16, 2016	0.73
"Lisa Ling visits Chicago to investigate whether a gentler approach to heroin use is being applied equally to the rich and poor, black and white."
20	4	"21st Century Brothels"	October 23, 2016	0.83
"Lisa Ling travels to the most famous legal brothel, the Moonlite BunnyRanch in Nevada, to meet women who make a living off lust."
21	5	"Silicon Valley Savants"	October 30, 2016	0.48
"Lisa Ling meets ambitious young people in San Francisco who hope to become the next Mark Zuckerberg."
22	6	"Wired Philly"	November 13, 2016	0.49
"Lisa Ling embeds with the Philadelphia Police Department to explore how new technology is changing what it means to be a 21st century cop in America."
23	7	"Sins of the Father"	November 20, 2016	0.49
"Lisa Ling interviews sexual assault survivors who are fighting in court to prevent the men who raped them visitation rights with their child."
24	8	"Prison Love"	November 27, 2016	0.46
"Lisa Ling investigates what drives women to seek romantic companionship with a prison inmate."

=== Season 4 (2017) ===
No. overall	No. in season	Title	Original release date	US viewers (millions)
25	1	"Sexual Healing"	October 1, 2017	0.63
"Lisa Ling goes on a journey through the scintillating worlds of Tantra and surrogate partner therapy in search of sexual healing."
26	2	"Chinese in America"	October 8, 2017	0.73
"Lisa explores the massive and economically diverse movement of immigration from China to the United States and traces her own family roots to find out what it means to be Chinese in America."
27	3	"Age of Consent"	October 15, 2017	0.58
"An exploration of the legal and social consequences of convicting adolescents and young adults of sex offenses."
28	4	"Patriot Movement"	October 22, 2017	0.62
"Lisa Ling reports on the Patriot Movement and embeds with a militia deep in the Arizona desert who are preparing for threats both foreign and domestic."
29	5	"America's First Muslims"	October 29, 2017	0.61
"Lisa meets three very different African American Muslims and learns about the power of Islam to reshape lives in the black community."
30	6	"Modern Love"	November 5, 2017	0.72
"Polygamy in America is examined."
31	7	"Lost Vegas"	November 19, 2017	0.80
"An exploration of the dark and sometimes dangerous underbelly of Las Vegas."
32	8	"Transbeauty"	November 26, 2017	N/A
"A look at the most prestigious transgender beauty pageant."

=== Season 5 (2018) ===
No. overall	No. in season	Title	Original release date	US viewers (millions)
33	1	"The Myth of MS-13"	September 23, 2018	0.82
"Lisa Ling reports on the ultraviolent world of MS-13."
34	2	"The Meth Crossroads"	September 30, 2018	0.68
"Lisa Ling meets the law enforcement teams working to curb the crystal meth epidemic plaguing the people of Oklahoma."
35	3	"Gender Fluidity"	October 7, 2018	0.54
"Lisa Ling explores the revolution going on in how people think about genders. She meets individuals across the spectrum who are seeking acceptance from those closest to them."
36	4	"Screen Addiction"	October 14, 2018	0.62
"Lisa Ling goes in depth into the role technology plays in the mental health crisis."
37	5	"Children of Killers"	October 21, 2018	0.77
"Lisa Ling explores the lives of the children of mass murderers."
38	6	"The Mediums of Lily Dale"	October 28, 2018	0.57
"Lisa Ling travels to the Lily Dale Assembly, a cozy lakeside village in upstate New York that is a community of mediums."
39	7	"The Dad Dilemma"	November 11, 2018	0.50
"Lisa Ling meets up with dads on the losing side of custody battles. She dives deep into the world of child support and lawyer fees from the perspective of different men fighting to be active fathers."
40	8	"Furry Nation"	November 18, 2018	0.49
"Lisa Ling explores a unique community of animal super-fans called "furries.""

=== Season 6 (2019) ===
No. overall	No. in season	Title	Original release date	US viewers (millions)
41	1	"Porn Ed"	September 29, 2019	0.58
"Lisa Ling takes on a topic most of us avoid: online pornography and how it is shaping a generation's perception on sex and intimacy."
42	2	"The Benzos Crisis"	October 6, 2019	0.56
"Lisa Ling delves into the world of benzodiazepine use and uncovers the troubling threat these drugs pose when used long term, and the challenges facing patients who try to quit."
43	3	"A Few Good Women"	October 13, 2019	0.47
"Lisa Ling gets a rare look inside the Marine's initiative to integrate the men and women in combat training, where they learn to fight and kill."
44	4	"Mississippi Gangland"	October 20, 2019	0.52
"Lisa Ling explores the inner workings of Mississippi's fastest growing gang, The Simon City Royals, and how some members are walking away from the brotherhood and turning their lives around."
45	5	"Twinning"	October 27, 2019	0.69
"Lisa Ling explores the endless fascination with identical twins and the unfathomable bond shared between them."
46	6	"When Women Kill"	November 3, 2019	0.50
"A conversation with two women who have been convicted with murder."
47	7	"Swingers"	November 10, 2019	0.64
"Lisa Ling attends the country's largest swingers party in New Orleans and learns how the swinging lifestyle is evolving into a movement for total sexual freedom."
48	8	"Fighting Terror in NYC"	November 17, 2019	0.61
"In the weeks leading up to New Year's Eve, Lisa Ling embeds with the NYPD to find out what it takes to keep NYC safe from terror threats."

=== Season 7 (2020) ===
No. overall	No. in season	Title	Original release date	US viewers (millions)
49	1	"Prison & Prep School"	November 29, 2020	N/A
"Lisa witnesses the melding of two worlds: a prison and a prep school, and experiences the surprising outcome of the unlikeliest of bonds."
50	2	"Lost Boys"	November 29, 2020	N/A
"Lisa explores the critical transition when boys become men, and investigates how the digital age is impacting a generation of young boys."
51	3	"When Heroin Hits Home"	December 6, 2020	N/A
"Lisa witnesses what happens when heroin addiction hits home. From children forced to grow up way too soon, to addicts fighting to get clean and keep their babies, Lisa experiences the new support structure for families affected by addiction."
52	4	"The Secret World Of Massage Parlors"	December 6, 2020	N/A
"Lisa investigates the illicit massage parlor industry, from the police struggling to curtail trafficking, to the desperate circumstances that lead women into this lucrative yet exploitative trade."
53	5	"Under the Gun"	December 13, 2020	N/A
"Lisa meets members of one of the fastest growing groups in the country. People from all walks of life who have joined "the club no one wants to be a part of" – families of victims and survivors of gun violence."
54	6	"Psychedelic Healing"	December 20, 2020	N/A
"Lisa Ling explores the medical uses of psychedelics and examines how for some the hallucinogenic toolbox might hold the key to a healthier future."

=== Season 8 (2021) ===
No. overall	No. in season	Title	Original release date	US viewers (millions)
55	1	"The Legacy of Vincent Chin"	October 10, 2021	N/A
"Lisa shines light on the murder of a Chinese American in Motor City in the 1980s and witnesses communities combatting a new wave of anti-Asian hate crimes."
56	2	"The Conspiracy Effect"	October 17, 2021	N/A
"Lisa reveals the deep roots of conspiracy thinking and misinformation in America, and how tech companies have been profiting from the fallout."
57	3	"Sex Work: Past, Present & Future"	October 24, 2021	N/A
"Lisa investigates the current debate about decriminalizing sex work, and uncovers a surprising experiment during the Civil War to legalize the world’s oldest profession."
58	4	"American Militias"	October 31, 2021	N/A
"Lisa unpacks the origins of so-called militias in America and the dramatic emergence of armed movements as a domestic threat."
59	5	"Chicago’s History of Violence"	November 7, 2021	N/A
"Lisa will take a journey back in time to ask if 'Black on Black' crime is a result of over one hundred years of deliberate and systematic actions by a group of people who felt oppressed when they first arrived in Chicago."
60	6	"Gay Panic"	November 14, 2021	N/A
"Lisa uncovers a Cold War campaign to purge LGBTQ+ Individuals from the government and meets those who are still grappling with its legacy."
61	7	"Osage: Reign of Terror"	November 21, 2021	N/A
"Lisa investigates the murders of wealthy Native Americans during the 1920s oil boom and witnesses how the descendants are fighting to revive what was nearly lost forever."
62	8	"Speaking Out: Sexual Assault in The Military"	November 28, 2021	N/A
"Lisa investigates what may finally be a tipping point for true reform in the decades-long history of sexual assault and harassment in the military."

=== Season 9 (2022) ===
No. overall	No. in season	Title	Original release date	US viewers (millions)
63	1	"Sex, Love, and Technology"	November 27, 2022	N/A
During one of the loneliest times in history, technology provided new ways to connect; VR, AI and even sex dolls have become a way for many people trying to assuage their loneliness.
64	2	"Got Sperm?"	December 4, 2022	N/A
In the world of online sperm donation, moms uninterested in sperm banks meet donors online; Lisa meets prolific donor Ari Nagel, father to more than 117 children.
65	3	"Tiger Queens"	December 4, 2022	N/A
A road trip into the soul of post-Tiger King America, where the abuse and exploitation of tigers continues, and a group of passionate female journalists, activists, scientists and conservationists work to shut it down.
66	4	"LA's Mental Health Crisis"	December 11, 2022	N/A
Lisa explores serious mental illness and how it's affecting her home city of Los Angeles; she meets those who are suffering as well as those who are fighting to help people in need.
67	5	"We Have a Drinking Problem"	December 18, 2022	N/A
Lisa explores America's epidemic of alcoholism, and how its upsurge through the pandemic is having a shocking impact on the health of approximately 15 million people.
68	6	"Interracial Love"	December 18, 2022	N/A
Even in 2022, stigma against interracial marriages continue; Lisa meets three different interracial couples who took the leap, and explores the story of their lives in a divided country.

== Awards and nominations ==
Year	Award	Category	Result
2017	Gracie Awards	Outstanding Non-Fiction or Reality Show	Won
