= Euna Lee =

American journalist (born 1972)

Euna Lee (유나 리)
- Born: 1972 (age 53–54); South Korea
- Other name: Lee Seung-eun (이승은)
- Occupation: Journalist
- Notable credit: Current TV
- Spouse: Michael Saldate
- Children: 1

Euna Lee (Korean: 리 유나; born 1972) is an American journalist. While working for Current TV, Lee and fellow journalist Laura Ling were detained in North Korea after they crossed into the Democratic People's Republic of Korea from the People's Republic of China without a visa in March 2009. They were found guilty of illegal entry and sentenced to twelve years' hard labor in June 2009. The United States Government protested the sentences and initiated diplomatic efforts in order to secure their release. On August 4, 2009, Lee and Ling were pardoned by the North Korean government after a special humanitarian visit by former U.S. President Bill Clinton. She wrote a book on her experiences in North Korea titled The World Is Bigger Now: An American Journalist's Release from Captivity in North Korea ... A Remarkable Story of Faith, Family, and Forgiveness.

== Biography ==
Lee was born and raised in South Korea, and moved to the United States in order to attend Academy of Art University, where she received a Bachelor of Fine Arts degree in Film and Broadcasting. She graduated from the Columbia University Graduate School of Journalism in 2012. She is married to actor Michael Saldate; they have a daughter, Hana.

On August 4, 2009, Bill Clinton visited North Korea in an attempt to free Lee and fellow journalist Laura Ling. The North Korean government pardoned both Lee and Ling after meeting with Clinton that day. It was reported that they left behind the equipment and materials they used for their interviews and that there was information about defectors and human rights activists contained in those interviews. North Korean rights’ activists alleged that allowing the North Korean authorities to retain that information exposed the defectors and human rights’ activists to further danger. Human rights activists in South Korea accused Lee and Ling of placing North Korean refugees in danger through their actions.

== Awards and honours ==
In 2011, Lee and Ling received the McGill Medal for Journalistic Courage from the Grady College of Journalism and Mass Communication.

== Published works ==
- Lee, Euna; Dickey, Lisa (2010). The World is Bigger Now: An American Journalist's Release from Captivity in North Korea – a Remarkable Story of Faith, Family, and Forgiveness. New York: Broadway Books. ISBN 978-0307-716132.

== See also ==
- 2009 imprisonment of American journalists by North Korea
- List of foreign nationals detained in North Korea
- Han Park
