= Illinois Green Party =

Illinois affiliate of the Green Party

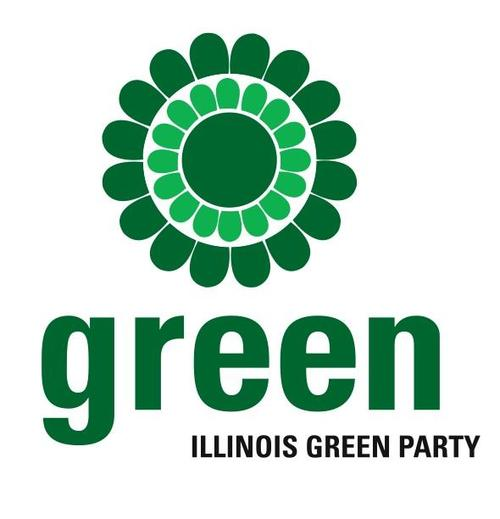
- Abbreviation: ILGP
- House Leader: None
- Senate Leader: None
- Headquarters: 213 S. Wheaton Ave, Wheaton, Illinois, 60189
- Student wing: Young Greens
- Ideology: Green politics
- Political position: Left-wing
- National affiliation: Green Party of the United States
- Colors: Green
- Illinois Senate: 0 / 59
- Illinois House of Representatives: 0 / 118
- Statewide Officers: 0 / 6
- Local offices: 2 (March 2026)

Website
- www.ilgp.org

The Illinois Green Party is a statewide political party in Illinois. The party is state affiliate of the Green Party of the United States.

The party ran its first statewide candidates in 2006, led by Rich Whitney, candidate for Illinois Governor, who received 361,336 votes, 10% of the total vote, making the Green Party one of only three legally established, statewide political parties in Illinois (in addition to the Democratic and Republican parties) until it lost that status in 2010, having not met the 5% statewide vote threshold.

As of March 2026, there are currently eight local chapters affiliated with the party, and two members holding elected positions in local government in the state.

== Political positions ==
Like the national party, the Illinois Green Party promotes the "Ten Key Values" of the Green Party platform: ecological wisdom; social justice and equal opportunity; grassroots democracy; non-violence; decentralization, community-based economics, feminism and gender equality, respect for diversity, personal and global responsibility, and future focus and sustainability.

== History ==
=== 2006–2010 ===
At the 2007 Green National Meeting the Illinois Green Party submitted a proposal to host the 2008 Green Party National Convention in Chicago, which was chosen by the party's national committee over submissions from four other cities.

As an established party it was entitled to a presidential primary, if at least two candidates qualify for that primary. In 2007, Illinois law required all candidates in the presidential primary to submit 3,000 signatures by November. On November 5, 2007 the deadline for candidate petitions to run in the Green presidential primary, four candidates filed: Cynthia McKinney, Kent Mesplay, Jared Ball and Howie Hawkins. Illinois was one of at least four state affiliates of the Green Party to hold presidential primaries in 2008.

In 2010, Rich Whitney again ran for Governor of Illinois. LeAlan Jones, a journalist and activist from Chicago's South Side, ran for Senate. Both were uncontested in the June primary. Both Whitney and Jones were excluded from televised debates, despite the Green Party's 'Major Party' status. Whitney and Jones filed a lawsuit against Public Broadcasting Station member WTTW for excluding them. A private vendor of ballots misspelled Rich Whitney's name as Rich 'Whitey' in 23 Chicago wards, about half of which were in predominantly African-American neighborhoods. There is no evidence this was intentional.

Jones was polling as high as 14% in a June 2010 poll, but ended up with 3.18% of the vote. In August 2010, Whitney polled 11% in a Public Policy Polling survey, but finally received just 2.70% of the vote. As neither candidate received over 5% of the vote statewide, the Illinois Green Party lost its 'Major Party' status.

=== 2011–present ===
In 2011, Scott Summers ran for governor and Sheldon Schafer ran for secretary of state as write-in candidates after being knocked off the statewide slate.

During the 2016 Senate elections, the Green Party ran Scott Summers securing only 2% of the voter share. Additionally, Tim Curtin ran during the Illinois Comptroller Special Election. Jill Stein was the party's nominee for President.

In 2020, Howie Hawkins won the nomination over Dario Hunter. In the general election, Howie Hawkins received less than 1% of the total vote share.

In 2024, Jill Stein once again won the ILGP presidential vote with 84 % of the vote, securing 16 of the state’s 19 delegates to the Green Party National Convention.

As of February 2026, the ILGP will seek to place its statewide slate on the 2026 ballot.

== Election results ==
President
| Year | Candidate | Votes | % |
|---|---|---|---|
| 2000 | Ralph Nader | 103,759 | 2.2% |
| 2004 | David Cobb (activist) | Not on ballot | |
| 2008 | Cynthia McKinney | 11,838 | 0.21% |
| 2012 | Jill Stein | 30,222 | 0.58% |
| 2016 | Jill Stein | 76,802 | 1.29% |
| 2020 | Howie Hawkins | 30,494 | 0.51% |
| 2024 | Jill Stein (write in) | 31,023 | 0.55% |

== See also ==
- Illinois gubernatorial election, 2006
- 2006 Election for statewide offices in the State of Illinois
- 2020 United States presidential election in Illinois
- Government of Illinois
