= Ida B. Wells Homes =

Former public housing development in Chicago, Illinois, United States

Coordinates: 41.826°N 87.612°W

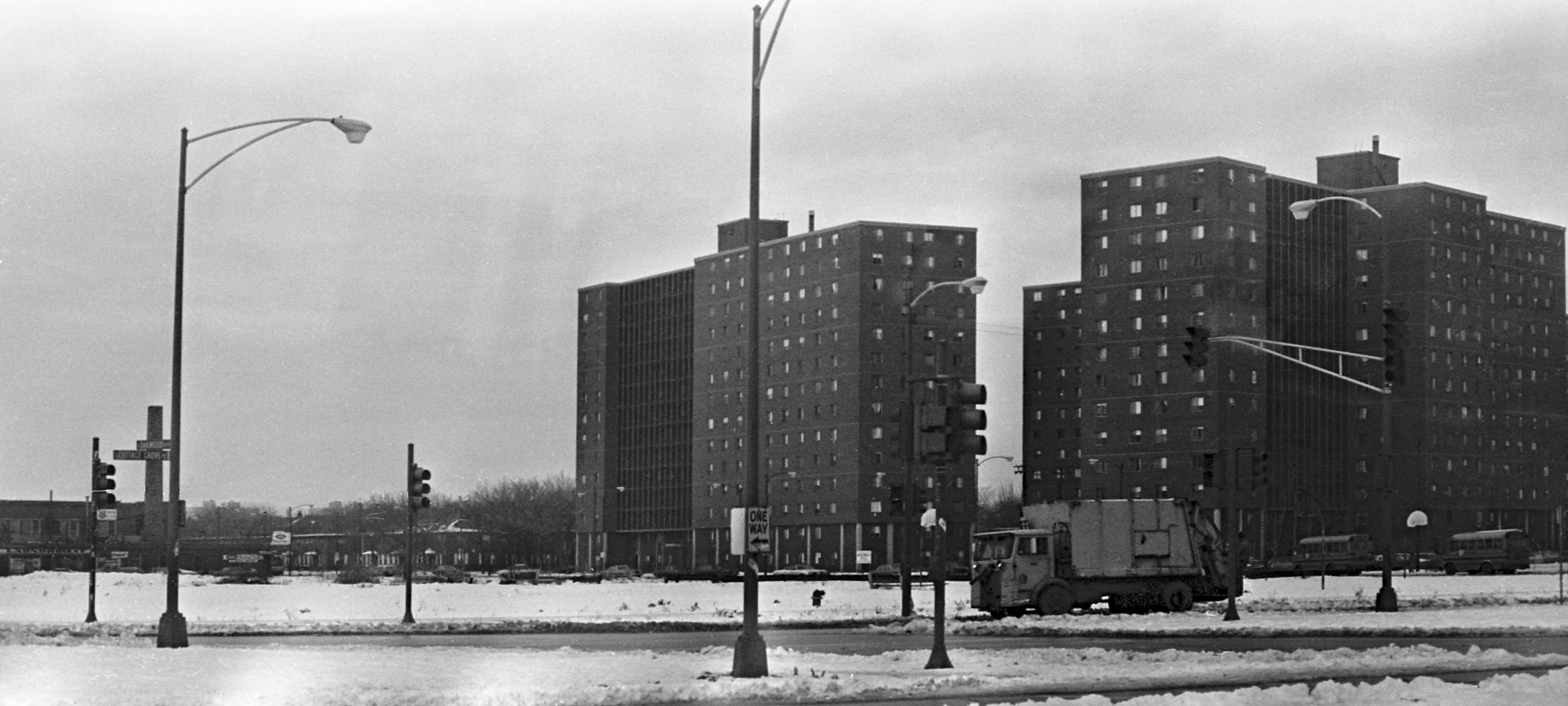
- Building within the Ida B. Wells Homes seen from East Oakwood Boulevard and South Cottage Grove Avenue, 1978.
- Interactive map of Ida B. Wells Homes

General information
- Location: Bounded by 35th Street, Pershing Road, King Drive, and Cottage Grove Avenue; Chicago, Illinois; United States
- Status: Demolished

Construction
- Constructed: 1939–41; Ida B. Wells Homes; 1961; Darrow Homes; 1970; Madden Park Homes

Listing
- Demolished: 2002–11

Other information
- Governing body: Chicago Housing Authority (CHA)

The Ida B. Wells Homes, which also included the Clarence Darrow Homes and Madden Park Homes, was a Chicago Housing Authority (CHA) public housing project in the Bronzeville neighborhood on the South Side of Chicago, Illinois, bordered by 35th Street to the north, Pershing Road (39th Street) to the south, Cottage Grove Avenue to the east, and Martin Luther King Drive to the west. The Ida B. Wells Homes consisted of rowhouses, mid-rises, and high-rise apartment buildings, constructed between 1939 and 1941 to house African American tenants. They were closed and demolished between 2002 and 2011.

Ida B. Wells (1862-1931), the civil rights advocate and investigative journalist, lived nearby, and The Light of Truth Ida B. Wells National Monument was dedicated in the neighborhood in 2022.

== History ==
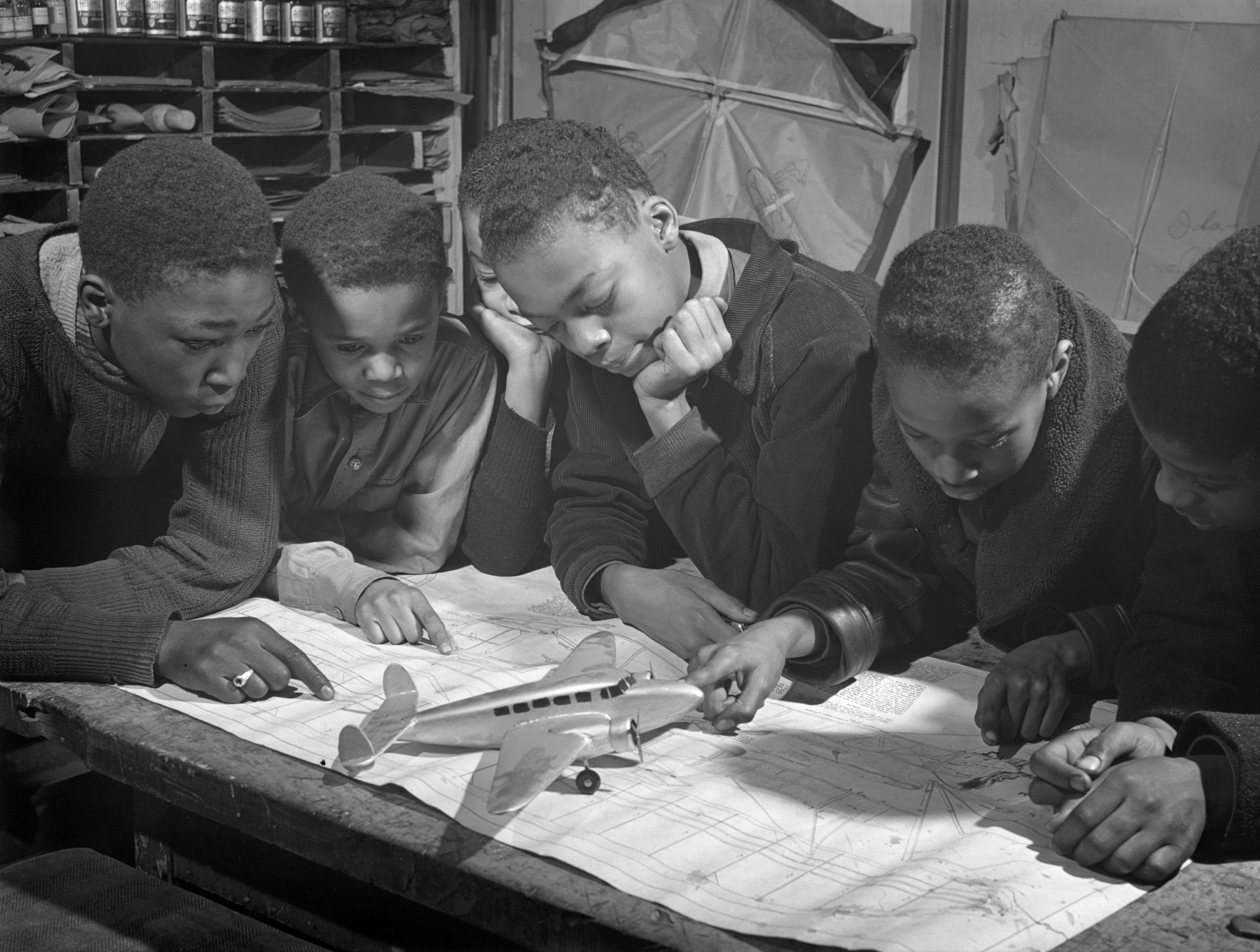
Students learn to make scale model aircraft for the war effort in a class at the Ida B. Wells Homes community center (March 1942)

Named for African American journalist and newspaper editor Ida B. Wells, the housing project was constructed between 1939 and 1941 as a Public Works Administration project to house black families in the "ghetto", in accordance with federal regulations requiring public housing projects to maintain the segregation of neighborhoods. It was the fourth public housing project constructed in Chicago before World War II and was much larger than the others, with 1,662 units. It had more than 860 apartments and almost 800 row houses and garden apartments, and included a city park, Madden Park. Described as "handsome [and] well planned", the project was initially a sought-after address and a route to success.

=== Darrow Homes and Madden Park Homes ===
In 1961, the Clarence Darrow Homes were built adjacent to the Ida B. Wells Homes and in 1970, the last of the Chicago Housing Authority's high-rise projects, the Madden Park Homes, were built east of the Wells. The "three huge, contiguous projects" lined the northern edge of the Oakland community area.

== Problems ==
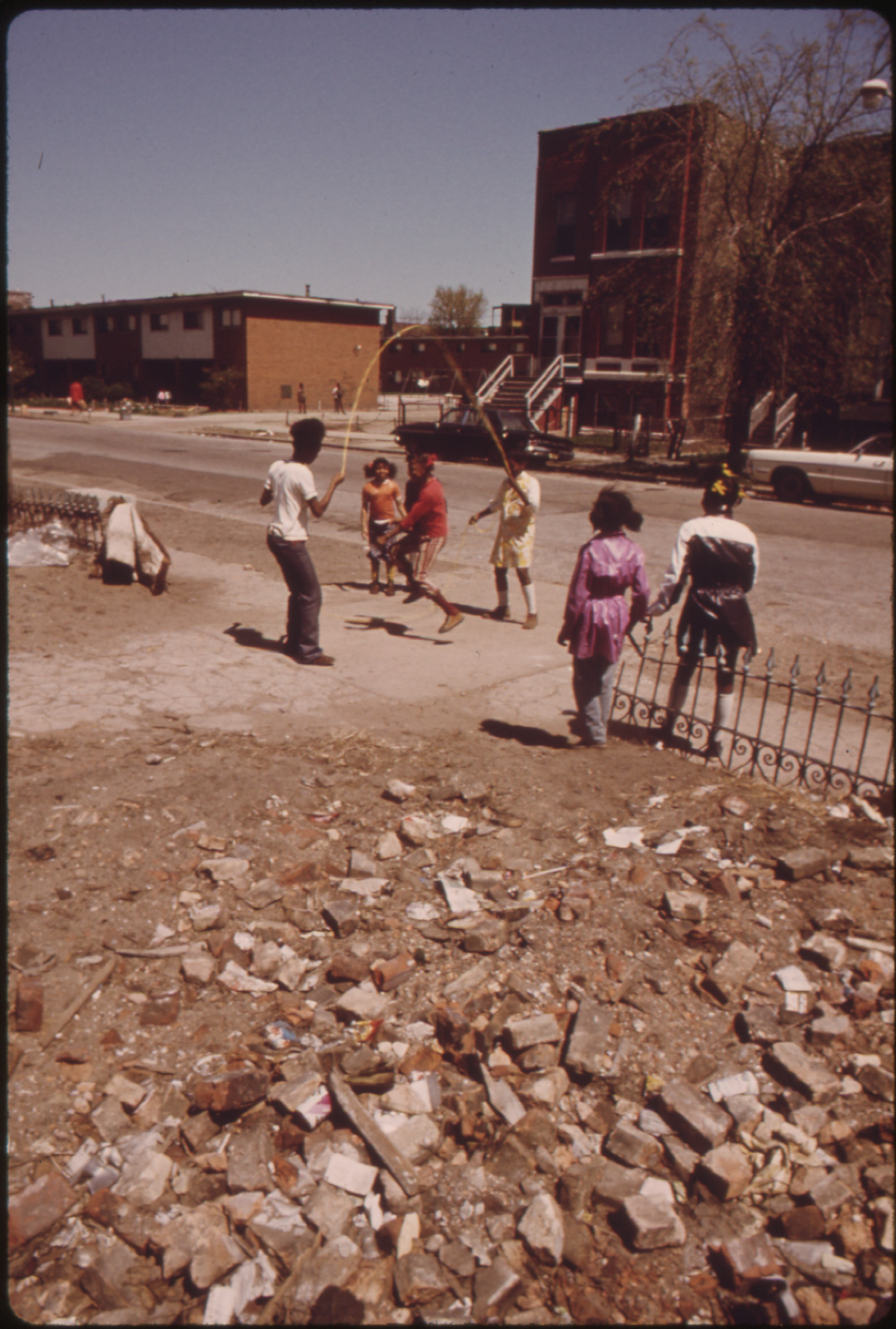
Children play outside the Ida B. Wells Homes (1973)

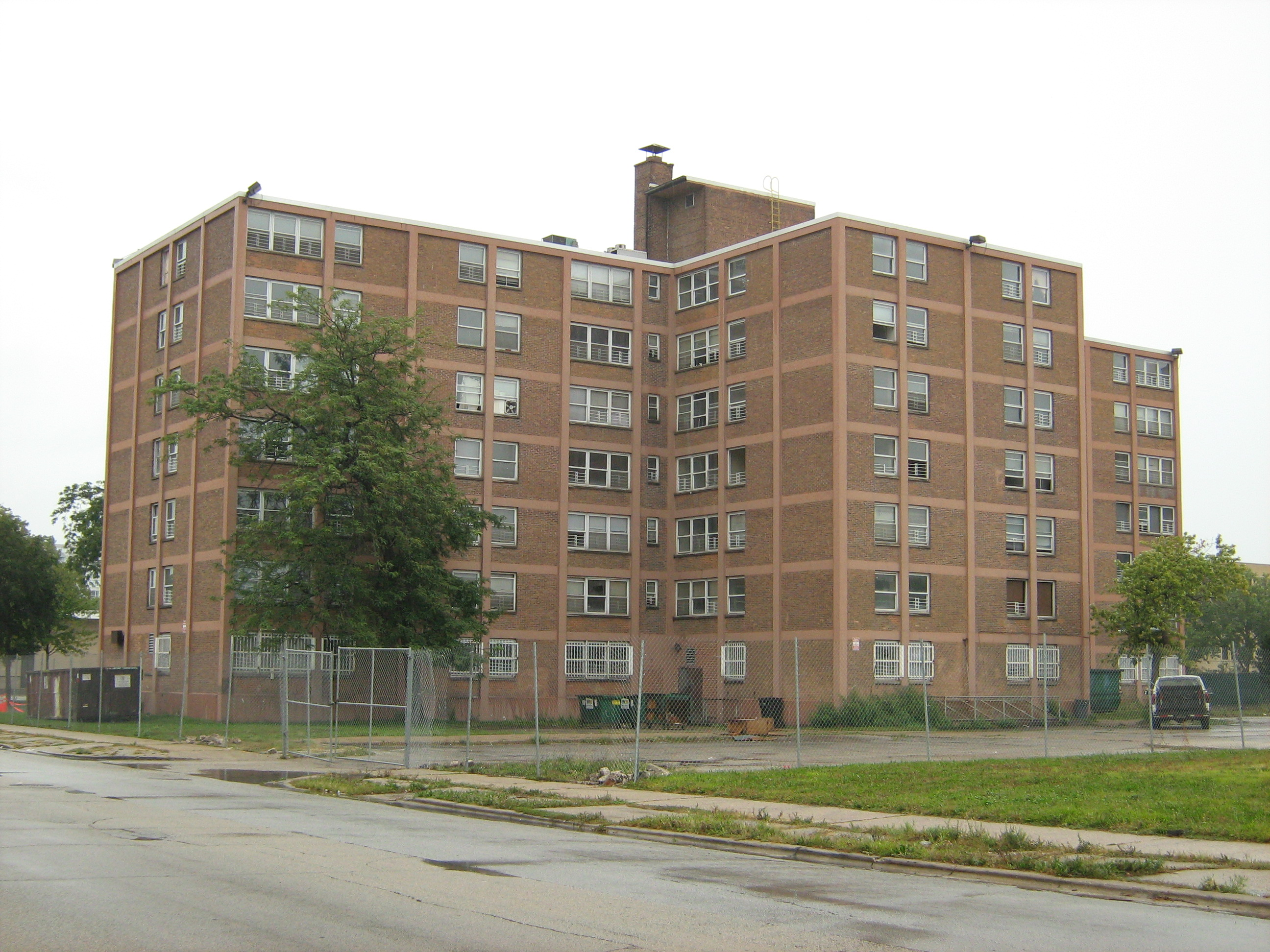
2008 photograph of one of the Ida B. Wells Extension Homes buildings.

By the 1980s, the Wells homes were plagued by problems such as neglect by the housing authority, gang violence, shootings, drug abuse, and drug dealing. The Black P. Stones gang in particular asserted authority over the area and residents of the Ida B. Wells Homes; Eugene Hairston, co-founder of the gang, was shot dead at his home there in September, 1988. One mother-and-son cocaine ring in the project reputedly had customers standing in line "50 at a time, 'like at a Popsicle stand on a hot day'". The 30-minute audio documentary Ghetto Life 101, released in 1993, was made by two teenagers from the project, LeAlan Jones and Lloyd Newman. Their second audio documentary, Remorse: The 14 Stories of Eric Morse, which won a Peabody Award, deals with the murder of 5-year-old Eric Morse in the project on October 13, 1994; he was pushed from the window of a vacant 14th-floor apartment by two older boys (aged 10 and 11) after he refused to steal candy for them. The project was also the location for Frederick Wiseman's 1997 documentary Public Housing.

== Demolition ==
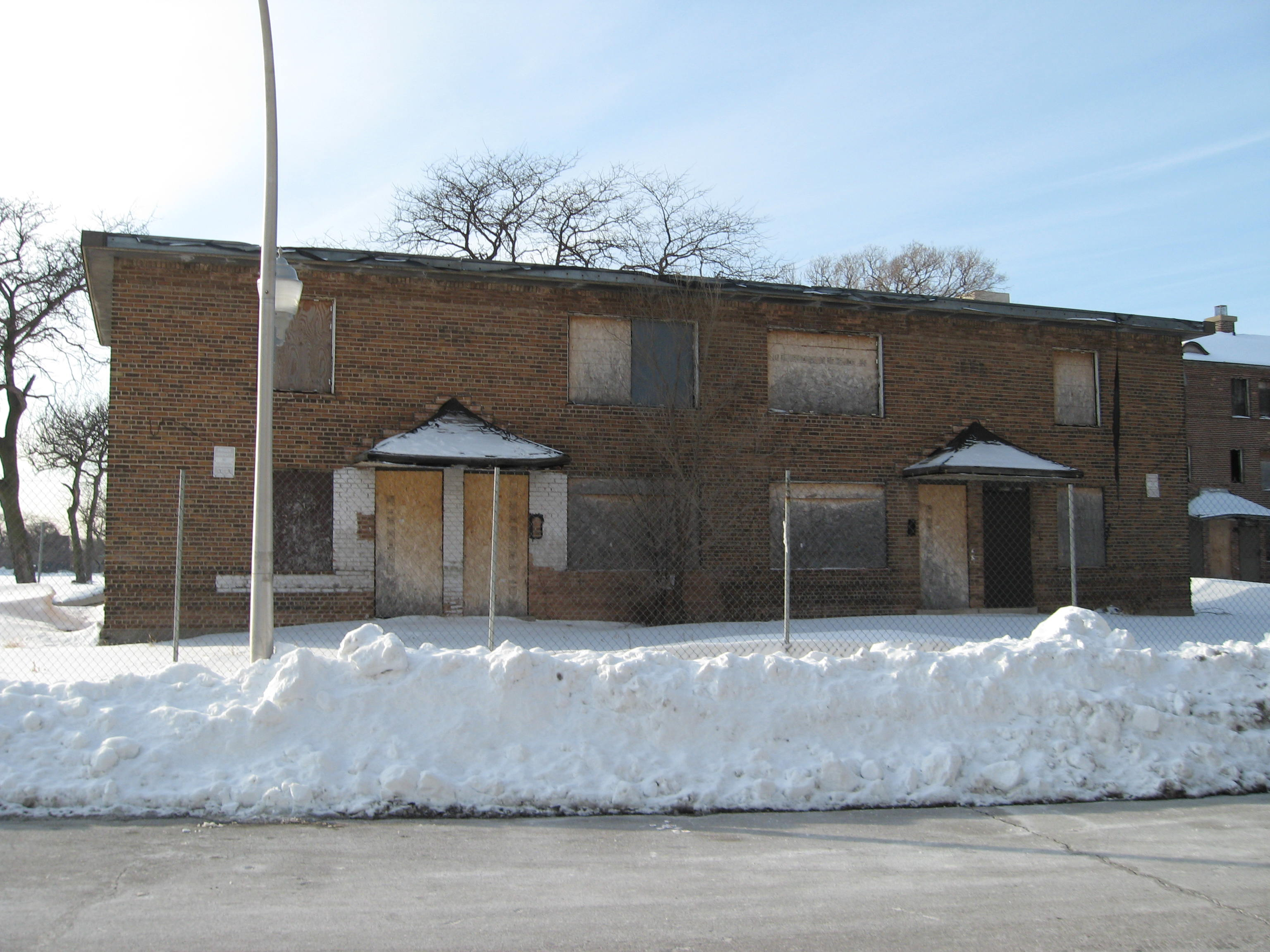
2011 photograph of one of the last Ida B. Wells rowhouses, prior to demolition.

In 1995, the United States Department of Housing and Urban Development took over the Chicago Housing Authority's public housing projects and decided to demolish the high-rises. Demolition began at the Ida B. Wells Homes in late 2002 with the high-rise buildings on Cottage Grove Avenue. It was completed in August 2011 with the demolition of the last two residential buildings at 3718 S. Vincennes Avenue. Construction began in 2003 on the mixed-income community of Oakwood Shores, which will replace all three housing projects, Ida B. Wells, Madden Park, and Clarence Darrow, A commission, led by Well's great grand-daughters raised funds for a public memorial to honor Wells near the site, which had also been close to Wells' own neighborhood. The Light of Truth Ida B. Wells National Monument created by well known abstract sculptor and Chicago artist Richard Hunt was unveiled on June 29, 2021.

== See also ==
- Cabrini Green
