= Ghetto Life 101 =

Radio broadcast documentary about life in the Southside of Chicago, Illinois, US

- Genre: Documentary
- Running time: 30 minutes
- Country of origin: United States
- Created by: LeAlan Jones and Lloyd Newman
- Produced by: David Isay
- Original release: May 18, 1993 – recurring rebroadcast

Ghetto Life 101 is a 30-minute radio broadcast documentary exploring the lives of residents of the South Side of Chicago, Illinois. It was created by teenagers LeAlan Jones and Lloyd Newman and produced by David Isay for National Public Radio. The broadcast garnered international acclaim and won several awards.

== Overview ==
Ghetto Life 101 illustrates life on the South Side of Chicago in 1993. The broadcast footage was recorded by LeAlan Jones and Lloyd Newman, who were thirteen and fourteen, respectively, at the time. The broadcast centered on interviews with the boys' families, friends, and members of the community.

== Reception ==
The broadcast was well received, and praised for its raw portrayal of life in the Chicago projects. It won several awards, including the Sigma Delta Chi Award, and the Corporation for Public Broadcasting's Awards for Excellence in Documentary Radio and Special Achievement in Radio Programming.

== Later works ==
External videos
- Booknotes interview with Jones on Our America: Life and Death on the South Side of Chicago, August 3, 1997, C-SPAN

Jones and Newman made a second documentary, Remorse: The 14 Stories of Eric Morse, which explored the backgrounds of people involved with Eric Morse, a five-year-old boy who was thrown from a fourteenth-story window in the Chicago projects by two older boys, after he refused to steal candy for them. This won the Robert F. Kennedy Journalism Award and a Peabody Award in 1996.

The two documentaries and further footage from when Jones and Newman were nearing high school graduation were condensed into a book published in 1997 entitled Our America: Life and Death on the South Side of Chicago, which later became the basis for the 2002 TV Movie Our America.

Lloyd Newman died on December 7, 2022 at the age of 43 from Sickle Cell Anemia Complications.
