= The Light of Truth Ida B. Wells National Monument =

Public sculpture in Chicago, Illinois, U.S.

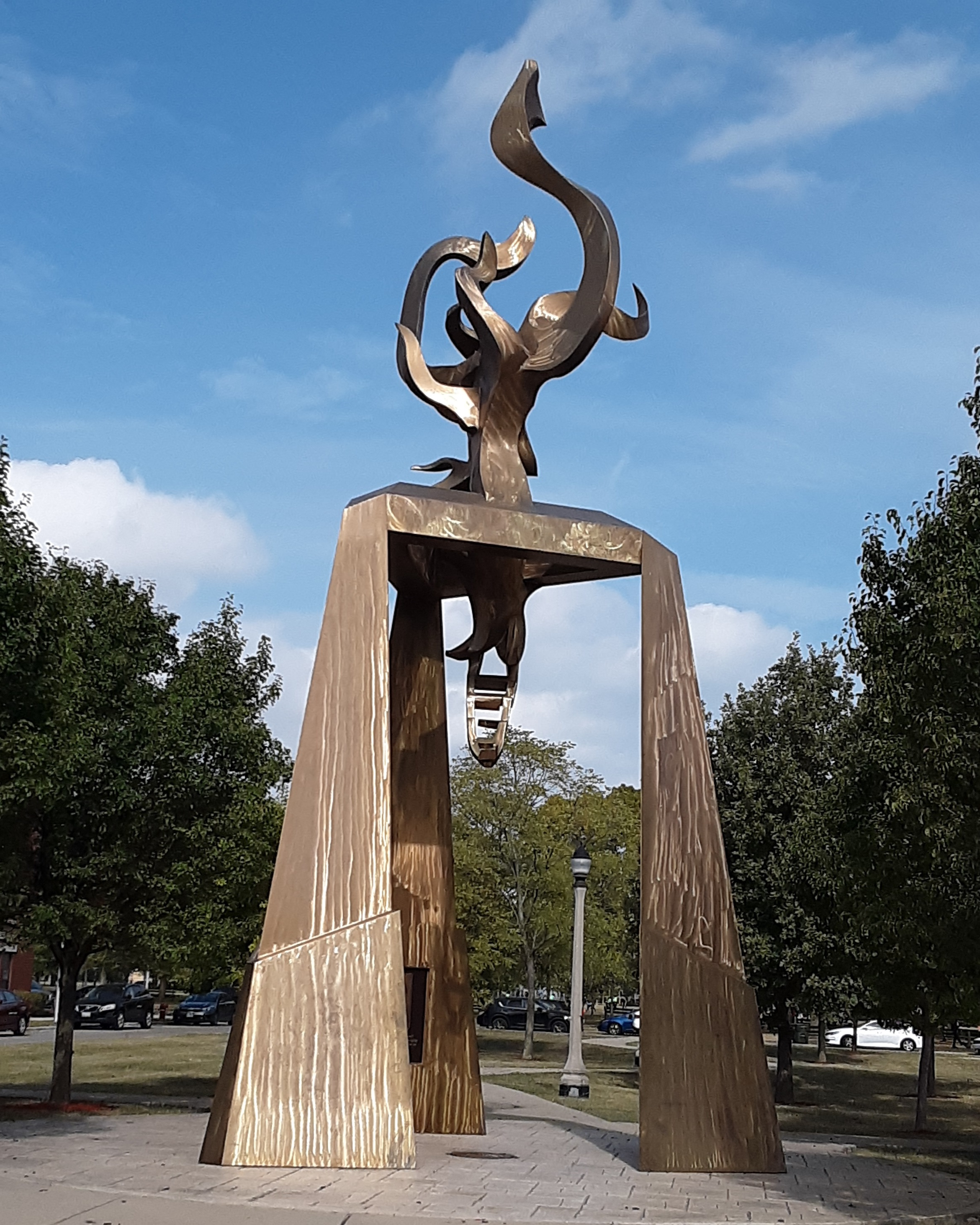
- Artist: Richard Hunt
- Completion date: 2021
- Medium: Granite and bronze sculpture
- Location: Bronzeville, Chicago, U.S.
- 41°49′35.9″N 87°36′36.5″W

The Light of Truth Ida B. Wells National Monument is a bronze and marble public sculpture by artist Richard Hunt. Located in the Bronzeville neighborhood on the South Side of Chicago, the sculpture takes its name from a quote by civil rights activist and investigative journalist Ida B. Wells-Barnett (1862-1931): "The way to right wrongs is to turn the light of truth upon them". It was unveiled in 2021 by the Ida B. Wells Commemorative Art Committee.

== Description ==
The Ida B. Wells National Monument is made of granite and bronze and is located in a plaza at 37th Street and South Langley Avenue, on the former site of the Ida B. Wells Homes housing complex and just blocks away from where Wells-Barnett lived. Hunt's abstract art centerpiece is 35 feet (11 m) high, weighs 14,000 pounds (6.3 long tons; 7.0 short tons) and features two etched images of Wells-Barnett as well as some of her famous quotes. One inscription reads: "What is or should be a woman? ... A strong bright presence, thoroughly imbued with a sense of her mission on earth and a desire to fill it."

The monument honors the intrepid, prolific and now iconic Black journalist and publisher Ida B. Wells-Barnett who lived in Chicago with her husband and children. Throughout her life, Wells-Barnett worked fiercely and tirelessly to advance civil rights for Black Americans; to seek justice for Black men who had been lynched by racist white mobs and authority figures in the South; and she relentlessly pushed for women's right to vote. Wells-Barnett started several organizations to help African-Americans gain economic and political power in Chicago and across the country.

== Background and history ==
The national monument was the culmination of more than a decade of crusading and fundraising by the Committee which included Michelle Duster and Daniel Duster, who are the great-grandchildren of Ida B. Wells-Barnett. In addition, dozens of residents who lived in the public housing complex that carried Wells' name pitched in to draw attention to the effort and committed their resources to getting the monument built. Residents who knew of Wells-Barnett's work creating the first kindergarten for Black children and helping to get the first Black alderman, Oscar DePriest, elected to the Chicago City Council chipped in donations to help pay for a monument that properly recognized the leaders' many contributions to humanity.

The effort on Twitter by Michelle Duster to create support for the monument gained new momentum in 2018 when the activist, educator, author, prison abolitionist and determined patroness Mariame Kaba and Pulitzer Prize winner, MacArthur Foundation Genius Awardee, writer, speaker and journalist Nikole Hannah-Jones began advocating for the projects' completion. After a social media push by Kaba and Hannah-Jones, a total of over 4,300 people donated money to get the monument built. The fundraising push coincided with Wells-Barnett's July 16 birthday.

That same summer, Chicago City Council voted to change the major downtown Congress Parkway to Ida B. Wells Drive in Chicago. In 2020, she was posthumously awarded a Pulitzer Prize Special Citation for her journalism work that chronicled lynching.

The Light of Truth Ida B. Wells National Monument is the first of such large scale to honor a Black woman leader in Chicago. The other two monuments honoring Black women in Chicago are: the bust of the University of Chicago scholar Georgiana Rose Simpson, which was unveiled in 2017; and the statue of poet Gwendolyn Brooks, which was unveiled in 2018.

At the unveiling ceremony revealing the work, Michelle Duster said, "Ida represented the community, and it means a lot to have the community embrace this."

== See also ==
- 2021 in art
