= 2009 imprisonment of American journalists by North Korea =

US–North Korea diplomatic standoff

Euna Lee and Laura Ling were detained by the North Korean army.

On March 17, 2009, North Korean soldiers detained two American journalists, Euna Lee and Laura Ling, who were working for the American-based independent television station Current TV, at the Tumen River on the China–North Korea border. It is contested whether the film crew entered North Korea, or was pursued and arrested on the Chinese side of the river. They were found guilty of illegal entry and sentenced to twelve years' hard labor in June 2009. The North Korean leader Kim Jong Il pardoned the two on August 5, 2009, the day after the former U.S. president Bill Clinton arrived in the country on a publicly unannounced visit.

== Background ==
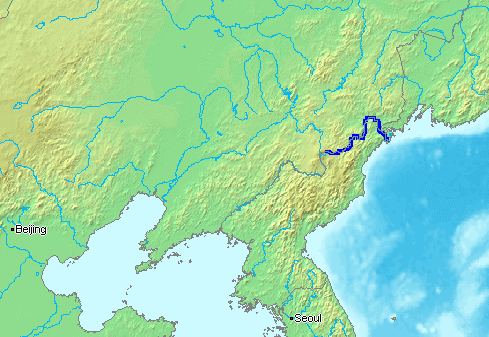
The Tumen River on the China–North Korea border, where the journalists were arrested

Korean American Euna Lee and Chinese American Laura Ling were journalists for Current TV, based in San Francisco, California. Lee was the news editor of the channel and Ling was one of the agency's reporters. Laura Ling is the younger sister of Lisa Ling, a special correspondent for The Oprah Winfrey Show and CNN, who did a documentary in 2005 for National Geographic Explorer about North Korea which involved entry into North Korea without disclosing she was a journalist. The two reporters were accompanied by two men, an American cameraman (Mitch Koss) and a guide who was an ethnic Korean citizen of China.

Pastor Chun Ki-won of refugee aid organization Durihana, who was featured in the 2004 documentary Seoul Train, had helped Lee and Ling organize their trip to China. After their arrival in China, Chun introduced Lee and Ling to Kim Seong-cheol (김성철), an ethnic Korean citizen of China who served as a guide and escort for the two reporters during their work.

== Arrest and trial ==
An unnamed diplomatic source was quoted by South Korea's Yonhap news agency on March 18 as stating: "Two reporters working for a American-based Internet news media outlet, including a Korean American, were detained by North Korean authorities earlier this week, and they remain in custody there." Reports said that the journalists were both warned several times by the soldiers of Korean People's Army about crossing the border. They were said to have been reporting on the trafficking of women and shooting video of the border region of China and North Korea when they were arrested at the Tumen River. They were caught by two Korean People's Army soldiers, Son Yong-ho and Kim Chol. Their guide Kim Seong-cheol and cameraman Mitch Koss evaded capture by running away faster but were later detained by officers of China's Public Security Bureau. Koss departed China soon afterwards.

In an interview in March, Chun speculated that the two reporters might have entered into North Korean territory. However, other sources such as Reporters Without Borders, echoing reporting by South Korean television station YTN, claim that North Korean border guards crossed the Tumen to the Chinese side to detain Ling and Lee. On April 23, 2015, Laura Ling herself released a story on a YouTube channel called Seeker Stories. She mentions that she was filming North Korea on Northeastern China's borders to report a story about North Korean defectors. While she was filming along the frozen Tumen River with the other crew, they were chased by North Korean soldiers. She was eventually knocked unconscious and dragged into North Korea by the soldiers and then was imprisoned until her release.

On March 30, the Korean Central News Agency (KCNA), the state news agency of North Korea, reported that preparations were under way for indictments and a trial, saying, "The illegal entry of US reporters into the DPRK (Democratic People's Republic of Korea) and their suspected hostile acts have been confirmed by evidence and their statements." The two faced trial on June 4.

== Sentencing and imprisonment ==
It was the third time that I've heard her voice since March 17 when they were first detained. And it was a very different call from the two previous calls. She was very deliberate and clear in her message, which was, look, you just have to know that we did violate North Korean law. We broke the law, we are sorry, and we need help. We need our government's help to try and get amnesty because that really is our only hope.

— Lisa Ling, speaking with KCRA-TV

On June 8, North Korean media reported that the two reporters had been found guilty of illegal entry and subsequently sentenced to twelve years of hard labor. Conditions in North Korea's prison camps are described as "extremely harsh". Defectors claim that prisoners in North Korean camps are subject to exposure, torture (including water torture), routine starvation, summary execution, daily beatings, and extended sentences without evidence. Following the trial, KCNA broadcast footage taken from Lee and Ling, which it claims showed them in the courtyard of a North Korean house. They reported that an investigation proved Lee and Ling to have crossed into North Korean territory with the intent to produce and broadcast a "documentary slandering the DPRK", and that the two admitted to committing "criminal acts". Lisa Ling read a statement on July 9 in which she stated her sister had indeed broken North Korean law; the two had recently spoken by telephone for the third time.

Because the United States has no diplomatic relations with North Korea, the contact was handled through the Swedish ambassador in Pyongyang, Mats Foyer, who also visited the two reporters. Han Park, a professor of political science at the University of Georgia, went to North Korea to negotiate their release, but Hillary Clinton refused to say whether Park traveled on behalf of the U.S. government. Park stated that the two journalists were staying at a guest house and had not yet been transferred to prison.

=== Reactions ===
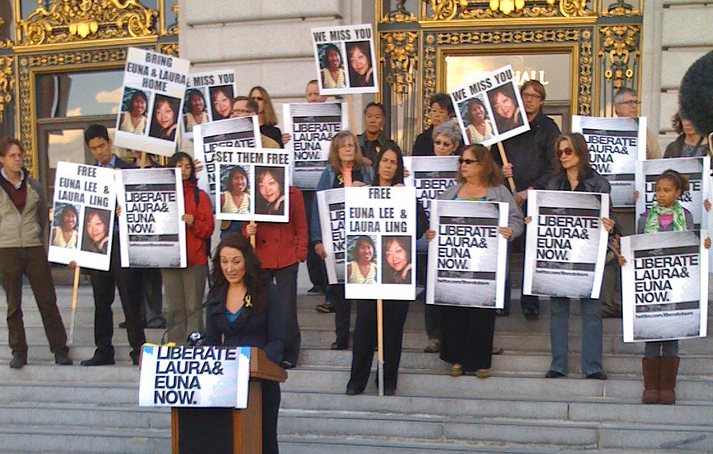
Vigils for journalists Laura Ling and Euna Lee were held throughout the United States on June 3, 2009.

Reporters Without Borders characterized the trial and sentencing as a "sham trial".

U.S. Secretary of State Hillary Clinton said at first that the charges against the journalists were "baseless". She had been considering sending an envoy to the country in an attempt to negotiate the journalists' release. However, it was later reported that the State Department would call on North Korea for "amnesty" for the two journalists; The Washington Post interpreted this as an admission by the U.S. government that the two are indeed guilty of an offense. The State Department had previously called for their release on "humanitarian" grounds. The co-founder of Current TV, former U.S. Vice President Al Gore, was also considered for travel to North Korea.

According to Kim Tae-woo of the Korea Institute for Defense Analysis, a South Korean institute, "[t]he journalists considerably weakened their government's leverage against the North" in ongoing negotiations over the DPRK's nuclear program. William Stanton, the deputy chief of mission at the U.S. embassy in Seoul, reportedly expressed a similar but stronger view, calling the two journalists "stupid" and arguing that their arrest was "distracting from bigger issues" in April 8 remarks to several U.S. congressional staff visiting South Korea. One of Stanton's guests was so upset by his remarks that he wrote a memorandum of complaint to a member of Congress, which sparked wide discussion.

Other South Koreans, including religious and human rights figures, similarly blamed Lee and Ling for actually endangering the subjects of their reporting. Lee Chan-woo, a Christian pastor who ran various North Korean refugee aid programs in China, had his house searched by Chinese police on March 19 and was then deported from the country in April. Five refugee safe-houses he ran were also shut down.

== Bill Clinton's visit to North Korea ==
Former President Bill Clinton made an unannounced trip to Pyongyang on August 4, 2009. Clinton was accompanied by his personal physician Roger Band, Doug Band, Justin Cooper, David Straub, and former White House Chief of Staff John Podesta. Clinton and his delegation were coached to neither smile nor frown when photographed with North Korean leader Kim Jong Il. Although the official news agency of North Korea, the Korean Central News Agency (KCNA), did not announce the reason for Clinton's arrival, Western and South Korean media speculated that Clinton went to Pyongyang in order to negotiate the release of Euna Lee and Laura Ling. White House spokesman Robert Gibbs confirmed that Clinton was on a "solely private mission to secure the release of two Americans."

Clinton spent twenty hours in North Korea and had a meeting with Kim Jong Il. According to KCNA, he conveyed a verbal message to Kim from President Barack Obama although Robert Gibbs denied that Clinton was carrying any message from the Obama administration. Clinton and Kim had "an exhaustive conversation" that included "a wide-ranging exchange of views on the matters of common concern," KCNA reported. KCNA also reported that the National Defence Commission of North Korea hosted a dinner in honor of Clinton, but did not go into detail about what was discussed at the reception. In the early morning hours of August 5, KCNA announced that Kim Jong Il had issued a pardon to Lee and Ling.

The KCNA released the following statement purportedly describing the visit:

Former U.S. President Bill Clinton and his party visited the Democratic People's Republic of Korea from August 4 to 5. Kim Jong Il, general secretary of the Workers' Party of Korea and chairman of the National Defence Commission of the DPRK, met with Bill Clinton and his party. During their stay Clinton and his party paid a courtesy call on Kim Yong Nam, president of the Presidium of the Supreme People's Assembly.

Clinton expressed words of sincere apology to Kim Jong Il for the hostile acts committed by the two American journalists against the DPRK after illegally intruding into it. Clinton courteously conveyed to Kim Jong Il an earnest request of the U.S. government to leniently pardon them and send them back home from a humanitarian point of view. The meetings had candid and in-depth discussions on the pending issues between the DPRK and the U.S. in a sincere atmosphere and reached a consensus of views on seeking a negotiated settlement of them.

Kim Jong Il issued an order of the Chairman of the DPRK National Defence Commission on granting a special pardon to the two American journalists who had been sentenced to hard labor in accordance with Article 103 of the Socialist Constitution and releasing them. Clinton courteously conveyed a verbal message of U.S. President Barack Obama expressing profound thanks for this and reflecting views on ways of improving the relations between the two countries.

The measure taken to release the American journalists is a manifestation of the DPRK's humanitarian and peaceloving policy. The DPRK visit of Clinton and his party will contribute to deepening the understanding between the DPRK and the U.S. and building the bilateral confidence.

== Return and aftermath ==
After being released from custody by the North Koreans, Lee and Ling were flown back to Los Angeles with Clinton and his delegation in a Boeing 737 owned by Hollywood producer and Clinton friend Steve Bing's company Shangri-La Entertainment. They landed at Bob Hope Airport on August 5, shortly before 6:00 a.m. local time (UTC−7), where they were met by family and friends, as well as Al Gore. Ling spoke to the media, where she confirmed that they had not been sent to a hard labor camp, yet they lived in fear of being sent to one.

Laura Ling spoke at the airport. In addition to thanking Obama, Bill Clinton and Hillary Clinton, Vice President Gore, their loved ones, and others, she stated:

Thirty hours ago, Euna Lee and I were prisoners in North Korea. We feared that at any moment we could be sent to a hard labor camp, and, then, suddenly, were told that we were going to a meeting. We were taken to a location and when we walked through the doors, we saw standing before us President Bill Clinton. We were shocked but we knew instantly in our hearts that the nightmare of our lives was finally coming to an end and now we stand here home and free ... We are very grateful that we were granted amnesty by the government of North Korea, and we are so happy to be home, and we are just so anxious right now to be able to spend some quiet, private time getting reacquainted with our families. Thank you so much.

Gore told reporters that "President Obama and countless members of his administration have been deeply involved," in the effort to bring the journalists home. According to an unnamed Obama administration official, the trip had been in the works for months, and Lee and Ling told their families that the North Koreans specifically asked for Bill Clinton to come to North Korea, and that they would be freed if he made the trip. Ling's husband, Iain Clayton, confirmed that sending Clinton to Pyongyang was the idea of the North Koreans.

Hillary Clinton, on a multi-nation trip in Africa when Lee and Ling returned to the U.S., said that the Obama administration was "extremely excited" to see the two journalists reunited with their families. However, she denied that Bill Clinton apologized on behalf of the U.S. government to the North Koreans for Lee and Ling's actions. The Obama administration has stressed that Bill Clinton's trip was private, and only about the two journalists, not about other issues such as Pyongyang's nuclear program. "We have been working hard on the release of the two journalists, and we have always considered that a separate issue," the Secretary of State said. The future of the United States' relationship with North Korea was "really up to them," she concluded.

On August 6, 2009, Laura Ling's sister, Lisa, stated that her sister had told her subsequent to the return that the two former prisoners had entered North Korea without permission, but after about "thirty seconds", they were arrested by border guards. Lisa Ling indicated that her sister plans to write an editorial about their treatment while detained by the North Koreans subsequent to the arrest.

The two North Korean soldiers who caught Ling and Lee, Son Yong-ho and Kim Chol, were reportedly treated like heroes by their government; in December 2009, the Pyongyang-based Korean Central Television broadcast aired a special program with them, in which they discussed their experience of arresting the two journalists. They received a special award from Kim Jong Il, as well as extra leave time.

== Claims regarding border crossing ==
Christian missionaries active among North Korean refugees in northeast China claim that the guide was involved in a scheme by North Koreans to set a trap and capture a "foreign prize", a journalist. Chun also had warned the reporters to avoid the border area. However, in a statement made after their release, Laura Ling denies Chun ever having warned them, "Among other things, Chun claimed that he had warned us not to go to the river. In fact, he was well aware of our plans because he had been communicating with us throughout our time in China, and he never suggested we shouldn't go."

After their return to the United States, Ling and Lee claimed, in a written statement posted on Current TV's web site, that they had spent only a brief time in North Korean territory before crossing the river back into China, but were pursued by North Korean soldiers who dragged them once again onto North Korean soil.

A statement released by the Chinese government rejected these claims and a report by North Korea alleges footage from the journalists' camera showed the two knowingly entered North Korea and even intended to take home souvenirs. Kim Chol, one of the North Korean soldiers who arrested the two journalists, claimed in interviews on North Korean television that they attempted to bribe him for their release after they were caught, but that he rejected their offer.

== See also ==
- List of Americans detained by North Korea
- Korean Air Lines YS-11 hijacking, a South Korean flight hijacked to North Korea in 1969; though 39 passengers were ultimately freed in February 1970, seven passengers and four crew still have not been returned as of 2010
