= Brandon Hammond =

American actor (born 1984)

- Born: Brandon La Ron Hammond; February 6, 1984 (age 42); Baton Rouge, Louisiana, U.S.
- Occupation: Actor
- Years active: 1991–2002 (as an actor)

Brandon La Ron Hammond (born February 6, 1984) is an American former child actor who appeared in several movie and television roles mainly during the 1990s. He appeared in the feature films Waiting to Exhale (1995), Mars Attacks! (1996) and Soul Food (1997). He won an NAACP Image Award for his work in the latter.

On television, Hammond recurred on Western series Dr. Quinn, Medicine Woman (1996−98) and sitcom The Gregory Hines Show (1997−98). He earned a Young Artist Award nomination after performing in Gregory Hines. He also played the ten-year-old Michael Jordan in the 1996 family film Space Jam.

Hammond's latest performance was in the television film Our America (2002). In adulthood, Hammond is a filmmaker who writes and directs short films.

== Early life ==
Hammond was born as Brandon La Ron Hammond on February 6, 1984 in Baton Rouge, Louisiana, the son of Alfreda Williams, who managed her son's acting career.

== Career ==
He made his acting debut at the age of 6, appearing in commercials for Chevrolet and public service announcements. Hammond's first film role was in Menace II Society (1993) where he played the younger version of the main character Caine. He followed this up with roles in Strange Days and Waiting to Exhale, both released in 1995. Hammond appeared in the horror anthology Tales from the Hood (1995) as Walter, a young boy who is scared of his abusive stepfather. Hammond performed as Marcus Jr. in 1996 television film The Road to Galveston.

In 1996, Hammond appeared in three feature films. Hammond portrayed Sean Rayburn in The Fan, the son of Wesley Snipes' character who is kidnapped by Gil (Robert De Niro). He played Neville Williams in Tim Burton's Mars Attacks! and was a young Michael Jordan in Space Jam.

Hammond portrayed the character of Ahmad in Soul Food (1997). His performance in this film was well received, with critics describing Hammond as the film's standout actor, a natural and having talent that "far surpasses his age." He was awarded the NAACP Image Award in 1998 for Outstanding Youth Actor as Ahmad.

He had a recurring role on the television series Dr. Quinn, Medicine Woman during its final two seasons, playing the character of Anthony, an adopted son of Grace and Robert E. Hammond continued playing the role until Anthony was killed off. Hammond played the role of Gregory Hines' son, Matty Stevenson, in the short-lived sitcom The Gregory Hines Show (1997−98). A reviewer for The New York Times opined Hines and Hammond had good chemistry. In 1998, Hammond received two nominations for an Young Artist Award and YoungStar Award in recognition of his acting on Gregory Hines.

Hammond guest starred on various series during the 1990s and early 2000s, including Coach, Hangin' with Mr. Cooper, Dave's World, Early Edition and The West Wing. He appeared in crime drama Blue Hill Avenue (2001). Hammond's last role to date was Lloyd Newman in the 2002 Showtime film Our America. He received his third Young Artist Award nomination for acting in Our America.

When Hammond was 13 years old, he was diagnosed with an autoimmune disease called Castleman disease.

Following the end of his acting career, Hammond attended Saddleback College, where he submitted a student film titled Summer Blame (2006). His film was nominated at the Newport Beach Film Festival. Hammond wrote the short film Amaru, which received the award for best screenwriting at the John Singleton Short Film Competition in 2020.

== Filmography ==
=== Film ===
Year	Title	Role	Notes
1993	Menace II Society	Young Caine Lawson	
1995	Tales from the Hood	Walter Johnson	Segment: "Boys Do Get Bruised"
1995	Strange Days	Zander	
1995	Waiting to Exhale	John Harris Jr.	
1996	The Fan	Sean Rayburn	
1996	Space Jam	Young Michael Jordan	
1996	Mars Attacks!	Neville Williams	
1997	Soul Food	Ahmad Joseph	
2001	Blue Hill Avenue	Young E-Bone	

=== Television ===
Year	Title	Role	Notes
1993	Lies and Lullabies	Kenny	Television film
1994	Coach	Charles Williams	Episode: "Blue Chip Blues"
1996–1998	Dr. Quinn, Medicine Woman	Anthony	7 episodes
1997–1999	The Gregory Hines Show	Matty Stevenson	21 episodes
1998	Early Edition	Jesse	Episode: "Hot Day in the Old Town"
2000	The West Wing	Jeffrey Morgan	Episode: "The White House Pro-Am"
2002	Our America	Lloyd Newman	Television film

=== Home video ===
- 1994 Mickey's Fun Songs: Campout at Walt Disney World

== Awards and nominations ==
Awards
Year	Result	Award	Category	Nominated work
1998	Won	NAACP Image Awards	Outstanding Youth Actor	Soul Food
1998	Nominated	Young Artist Awards	Best Performance in a Feature Film: Leading Young Actor	Soul Food
1998	Nominated	Young Artist Awards	Best Performance in a TV Comedy Series: Supporting Young Actor	The Gregory Hines Show
1998	Nominated	YoungStar Awards	Best Young Actor in a Comedy TV Series	The Gregory Hines Show
1998	Nominated	YoungStar Awards	Best Young Actor in a Drama Film	Soul Food
2003	Nominated	Young Artist Awards	Best Performance in a TV Movie, Miniseries or Special - Supporting Young Actor	Our America
