= Soul Food (film) =

1997 American comedy-drama film by George Tillman Jr

- Theatrical release poster
- Directed by: George Tillman Jr.
- Written by: George Tillman Jr.
- Produced by: Tracey E. Edmonds; Robert Teitel
- Starring: Vanessa Williams; Vivica A. Fox; Nia Long; Michael Beach; Mekhi Phifer; Jeffrey D. Sams; Irma P. Hall; Gina Ravera; Brandon Hammond
- Cinematography: Paul Elliott
- Edited by: John Carter
- Music by: Lisa Coleman; Wendy Melvoin
- Production companies: Fox 2000 Pictures; Edmonds Entertainment
- Distributed by: 20th Century Fox
- Release date: September 26, 1997
- Running time: 115 minutes
- Country: United States
- Language: English
- Budget: $7.5 million
- Box office: $43.7 million

Soul Food is a 1997 American comedy-drama film written and directed by George Tillman Jr. in his major studio debut. Featuring an ensemble cast, the film stars Vanessa Williams, Vivica A. Fox, Nia Long, Michael Beach, Mekhi Phifer, Jeffrey D. Sams, Irma P. Hall, Gina Ravera and Brandon Hammond. The story centers on the trials of an extended Black American family, held together by longstanding family traditions which begin to fade as serious problems take center stage.

Tillman based the family in the film on his own and Soul Food was widely acclaimed for presenting a more positive image of African-Americans than is typically seen in Hollywood films. In 2000, Showtime premiered a one-hour television series based upon the film. In 2015, it was announced that 20th Century Fox is planning a sequel for the film called More Soul Food, written by Tillman.

== Plot ==
Soul Food, told through the eyes of 11-year-old Ahmad, follows the trials of the Joseph family, a close-knit Chicago family that gets together to have Sunday dinner every week, with plenty of soul food to go around. Mother (Big Mama) Joe has three daughters, who each have had varying success in life: oldest daughter Teri has become a successful lawyer but has a strained relationship with younger sister Maxine, Ahmad's mother, who stole and eventually married Teri's former boyfriend, Kenny. Teri is currently married to Miles, a lawyer who quits his job to pursue his dream of being an R&B musician, which Teri doesn't support. Youngest daughter Robin —nicknamed "Bird"—has just opened a barbershop/beauty parlor, and married Lem, an ex-convict.

Life becomes complicated when Mother Joe, the diabetic but wise and caring matriarch of the family and the glue that holds it together, suffers a debilitating stroke during an operation to amputate her leg and slips into a coma, dying shortly after sharing a last word of advice with Ahmad when she awakens five weeks later. Without her guidance, the family begins to fall apart in the interim. Teri takes in her troubled cousin Faith, who bonds with Miles over a love of the arts. The two are caught having sex by Teri, which later leads to a near-violent confrontation at Kenny and Maxine's anniversary party when she furiously comes after the two with a knife. Meanwhile, Lem gets fired from his job after being caught lying about his criminal record and cannot find a new one for the same reason, so Bird makes an uneasy deal with her former boyfriend Simuel St. James to get Lem a job. At work, Simuel tells Lem that Bird asked him to hire him and then provokes Lem by making inappropriate remarks about Bird. This leads Lem to assault Simuel, resulting in Lem's dismissal. When Lem discovers Bird was behind the deal, this leads to a heated confrontation, and during their argument, Teri overhears and mistakenly believes Lem was physically threatening her sister. Teri hires her cousin Blimp to teach Lem a lesson, but when the two men fight, which ends with Lem pulling a gun, the police become involved and Lem is arrested on assault and illegal gun possession charges.

Realizing her mistake, Teri calls in a few favors to have Lem released and later apologizes to him. The fighting between Teri and Maxine soon causes the Sunday dinners to stop and the Joseph family tradition to be broken after forty years due to the ongoing tensions. Everything comes to a head when, after Teri decides to sell the Joseph family home rather than get stuck with most of her mother's hospital bills, Maxine and Bird file an injunction to stop the sale, setting the stage for a major legal battle within the family. Throughout all this, Ahmad becomes worried about the state of his extended family and, following Big Mama's passing, conspires to find a way to bring them all back together.

Ahmad tells his relatives about a stash of money that Big Mama had hidden away some time ago but everyone dismisses him, believing it to be a myth. However, Ahmad manages to get everyone together for another Sunday dinner by promising them the whereabouts of the money. The dinner is uneasy as everyone starts confronting their issues, and eventually, they realize there is no money. Maxine chastises her son for lying, but Ahmad says tearfully that it was the only way to get everyone back together again, citing it as Big Mama's dying wish. As Maxine comforts her son, the kitchen catches on fire due to Ahmad having accidentally left a towel on the stove, and they all work together to try and to put it out. Just as they finish putting the fire out, Uncle Pete, Big Mama's brother, comes down with his television and drops it to reveal the money that Big Mama had hidden away.

Things start to go well for the family. Miles still comes by for Sunday dinner even though he and Teri are divorcing; Lem and Bird are expecting their first child; Teri and Maxine have made peace and the former opts to not sell the family house. Faith is finally becoming part of the family again and Uncle Pete, who never came out of his room, starts to join the family.

== Main cast ==
- Vanessa L. Williams as Teri
- Vivica A. Fox as Maxine
- Nia Long as Robyn / "Bird"
- Michael Beach as Miles
- Mekhi Phifer as Lem
- Brandon Hammond as Ahmad
- Jeffrey Sams as Kenny
- Gina Ravera as Faith
- Irma P. Hall as Josephine "Big Mama" Joseph
- Mel Jackson as Simuel

Halle Berry and Whitney Houston were both considered for the role of Teri. Regina King, Kenya Moore and Jada Pinkett Smith were all considered for the role of Bird. Vivica A. Fox auditioned for the role of Teri, but landed the role of Maxine instead. The character Miles (Michael Beach) plays keyboards in an R&B group called "Milestone"; the vocalists of the group are portrayed by two sibling teams of professional R&B performers: brothers K-Ci and Jo-Jo Hailey (of Jodeci and K-Ci & JoJo); and Babyface and his brothers Kevon Edmonds and Melvin Edmonds (both of After 7).

== Production ==
Soul Food was shot primarily on location in the Chicago area. A later Tillman-produced film, Barbershop, would also take place in and be shot on location in Chicago.

== Soundtrack ==
A soundtrack containing R&B and hip-hop was released on August 19, 1997, by LaFace Records. It peaked at #3 on the Billboard 200 and was eventually certified 2x Multi-Platinum for over 2 million copies sold.

== Reception ==
Soul Food received generally positive reviews from critics. It holds an 82% approval rating on Rotten Tomatoes, based on 44 reviews. The site's consensus reads, "Much like its titular cuisine, Soul Food blends a series of savory ingredients to offer warm, generous helpings of nourishment and comfort." On Metacritic, the film has a score of 68 out of 100, based on 15 critics, indicating "generally favorable reviews". Audiences polled by CinemaScore gave the film a rare grade of "A+" on an A+ to F scale.

Roger Ebert gave the film 3.5 out of 4 stars. Godfrey Cheshire of Variety magazine wrote: "Soul Food serves up family melodrama-cum-comedy that's tasty and satisfying, if not particularly profound or original."

The film earned $43,700,855 during its original theatrical run. The film opened at #3 in its opening weekend at $11,197,897 behind The Peacemaker's opening weekend and In & Out's second.

== Awards and nominations ==
Williams and Fox were nominated for an Image Award for "Outstanding Lead Actress in a Motion Picture"; Williams won, while Hammond won for "Outstanding Youth Actor/Actress" and Hall won for "Outstanding Supporting Actress in a Motion Picture." Phifer and Hall both appeared in HBO's 1999 adaptation of A Lesson Before Dying, the 1993 novel by Ernest J. Gaines. Hammond, Beach, and Sams all appeared in the 1995 film Waiting to Exhale, where Beach played the father of Hammond. Hall and Beach both appeared in the 1996 film A Family Thing. Soul Food spawned a follow-up cable television show on the Showtime network. Soul Food: The Series aired from 2000 to 2004 on Showtime and currently airs in reruns on TV One.

- Acapulco Black Film Festival (1998)
  - Best Film - Winner
  - Best Actor (Michael Beach) - Nomination
  - Best Actress (Vivica A. Fox) - Winner
  - Best Actress (Vanessa L. Williams) - Nomination
  - Best Soundtrack (Various Artists) - Nomination
  - Best Director (George Tillman Jr.) - Nomination
- Grammy Awards (1998)
  - Best Song Written Specifically for a Motion Picture or for a Television Series ("A Song for Mama", music & lyrics by Kenneth "Babyface" Edmonds) - Nomination
- MTV Movie Awards (1998)
  - Best Female Performance (Vivica A. Fox) - Nomination
  - Best Song ("A Song for Mama", music & lyrics by Kenneth "Babyface" Edmonds) - Nomination
- NAACP Image Awards (1998)
  - Outstanding Motion Picture - Winner
  - Outstanding Lead Actress in a Motion Picture (Vivica A. Fox) - Nomination
  - Outstanding Lead Actress in a Motion Picture (Vanessa L. Williams) - Winner
  - Outstanding Supporting Actress in a Motion Picture (Irma P. Hall) - Winner
  - Outstanding Youth Actor/Actress (Brandon Hammond) - Winner
- Satellite Awards (1998)
  - Best Song ("A Song for Mama", music & lyrics by Kenneth "Babyface" Edmonds) - Nomination

== See also ==
- List of films featuring diabetes
