= Lisa Ling =

American journalist (born 1973)

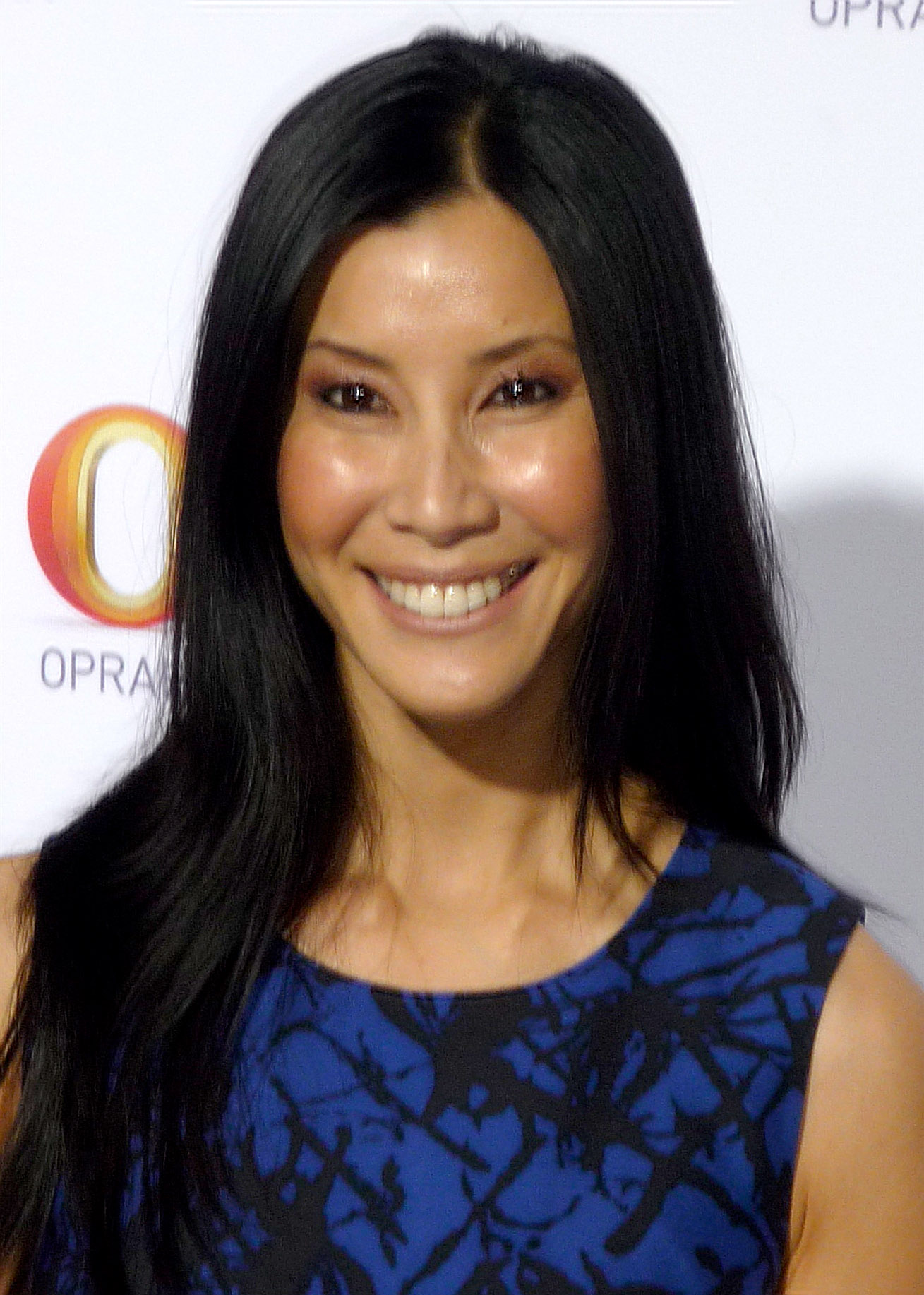
- Ling in 2011
- Born: August 30, 1973 (age 53); Sacramento, California, U.S.
- Education: University of Southern California
- Occupation: Journalist
- Years active: 1991–present
- Notable credits: The View (co-host, 1999–2002); Planet in Peril (co-host, 2008); National Geographic Explorer (host, 2003–10); Our America (host, 2011–14); This Is Life (host, 2014–22)
- Spouse: Paul Song (m. 2007)
- Children: 2
- Relatives: Laura Ling (sister)
- Website: Official website

Lisa Ling (born August 30, 1973) is an American journalist and television personality. She most recently was a news contributor for CBS News. Previously, she was the host for This Is Life with Lisa Ling on CNN, a reporter on Channel One News, a co-host on the ABC daytime talk show The View (1999–2002), the host of National Geographic Explorer (2003–2010), and a special correspondent for The Oprah Winfrey Show. Ling later hosted Our America with Lisa Ling on the Oprah Winfrey Network from 2011 to 2014.

== Early life ==
Ling was born in Sacramento, California. Her mother, Mary Mei-yan (née Wang), is a Taiwanese immigrant from Tainan, Taiwan, who served as the head of the Los Angeles office of the Formosan Association for Public Affairs. Ling's father, Chung Teh "Douglas" Ling, was born in Hong Kong in 1937. Her paternal grandmother was born on Labuan, now in modern-day Malaysia. Her paternal grandfather, who was from Guangzhou, Guangdong, was one of the first Chinese students allowed to study in the United States in the 1930s. He earned a degree from New York University and an M.B.A degree from University of Colorado. He struggled to find a job in the United States. He moved to California where he eventually opened the first Chinese restaurant in Folsom.

Ling's parents divorced when she was seven years old. Following the divorce, she and her sister Laura were raised by their father in Carmichael, near Sacramento. Ling admired reporter Connie Chung and aspired to become a journalist.

Ling was educated at Del Campo High School in Fair Oaks, California, graduating in 1991. She studied at the University of Southern California in Los Angeles.

Ling chose to leave USC before graduating, starting work as a reporter for Channel One News. She is fluent in Spanish.

== Career ==
=== The View (1999–2002) ===
Ling started in television when she was chosen as one of the four hosts of Scratch, a nationally syndicated teen magazine show based in Sacramento. At 18, she joined Channel One News as one of their youngest reporters and anchors. Among her roles was war correspondent, including assignments in Iraq and Afghanistan. She won several awards for her reporting and documentaries.

She joined The View on May 3, 1999, after beating out a reported 12,000 hopefuls who had auditioned to replace Debbie Matenopoulos. During her on-air audition for the show Ling got a navel piercing which Barbara Walters "thought was disgusting." Ling left the show after three and a half years towards the end of 2002 to go back to international reporting. She was responsible for proposing segments like investing for women, and, according to Ling, her goal was to say one thing each day that would make people think, whether it made them cheer or made them throw things at their TV. She drew both fire and praise for her comments after the September 11, 2001 attacks, in which she said, "What happened to the United States was a catastrophic event and the worst terrorist attack in human history. Yet maybe before we seek revenge, we should ask the question – why should anyone want to make such an attack on the U.S.?"

=== National Geographic and Oprah (2003–2010) ===
Ling accepted an offer to host National Geographic Ultimate Explorer. In 2005, the show moved to the National Geographic Channel and returned to its original name, National Geographic Explorer. Ling has covered the drug war in Colombia, investigated the notorious MS-13 gang, and explored the culture of U.S. prisons. She also was allowed to travel into North Korea as part of a medical missionary group, where she and a film team were able to document a rare look into North Korea. The trip was documented in the 2007 National Geographic documentary "Inside North Korea".

She then became a special correspondent for The Oprah Winfrey Show which has featured many of Ling's investigative pieces, including a report on North Korea. Ling's title is "Oprah Show Investigative Reporter." She also has reported on bride burning in India, gang rape in the Democratic Republic of the Congo, the Lord's Resistance Army in Uganda, child trafficking in Ghana, under cover investigation of Pennsylvanian puppy mills with Main Line Animal Rescue, the immediate aftermath of the hurricane in New Orleans, and the April 2007 Virginia Tech Massacre.

=== Planet in Peril and Our America (2008–2014) ===
In December 2008, CNN's award-winning documentary Planet in Peril featured Ling in the series' second installment, called "Battlelines". As a correspondent, she tracked excessive shark fishing in Costa Rica, elephant poaching in Chad, and explored the civil struggle within Nigeria for control over its oil. In 2010 Ling co-founded the website SecretSocietyOfWomen.com, a forum for women to share their problems anonymously.

On February 16, 2011, her 2014 Emmy Award Winning show Our America with Lisa Ling premiered on OWN: The Oprah Winfrey Network. It ran for five straight seasons.

=== This Is Life (2014–2022) ===
On April 14, 2014, CNN announced that Ling would host a documentary series titled, This is Life with Lisa Ling, in its primetime lineup. The show premiered on September 28, 2014.

In November 2022, the series was cancelled after then-CNN CEO Chris Licht discontinued CNN Original Series supplied by outside production companies.

=== HBO Max deal (2019–present) ===
On October 22, 2019, it was announced that Ling had signed an overall deal with HBO's streaming service HBO Max. The first project that Ling will create with HBO Max is titled Birth, Wedding, Funeral.

On April 22, 2021, it was announced that HBO Max had ordered Ling's six-part documentary series titled Take Out. The series will explore the world of America's Asian takeout restaurants and the lives of the people and families who keep them running.

=== CBS News (2023–2025) ===
On May 31, 2023, it was announced that Ling was hired as contributor for CBS News, reporting in-depth stories for its programs including CBS News Sunday Morning. She got laid off on Oct 30, 2025 with seven other on-air personalities.

== Personal life ==
In 2004, Ling met businessman Philip Levine of Florida through mutual friends. They started dating and were engaged on February 18, 2005. In October of that year, she broke it off, telling People magazine the main reason was their busy schedules, especially the frequent global travel required by her job.

On January 3, 2007, she announced her engagement to radiation oncologist Paul Song. They married on May 26, 2007, in Los Angeles, California. The wedding party included guests such as Connie Chung, one of Lisa's personal heroes, and actresses Kelly Hu and Diane Farr.

On June 7, 2009, she was awarded an honorary doctorate from National University, and gave the commencement speech there.

Ling gave birth to her first child, a daughter named Jett Ling Song, on March 8, 2013. She gave birth to a second child, a daughter named Ray Ling Song, on June 6, 2016. The family resides in Santa Monica, California.

Her younger sister, Laura Ling, also a journalist, was managing editor of Vanguard at Current TV and a host and reporter on E! Network. In March 2009 Laura and her colleague Euna Lee were detained by North Korea for illegal entry into the country. They had been attempting to film refugees along the border with China. In June, they were sentenced to 12 years in a labor prison for illegal entry into North Korea, and unspecified hostile acts. North Korea released Laura and Euna on August 4, 2009, after a visit from former U.S. President Bill Clinton. Lisa and Laura Ling went on to collaborate on a book, Somewhere Inside: One Sister's Captivity in North Korea and the Other's Fight to Bring Her Home, published in May 2010.

Lisa Ling identifies herself as a "die-hard feminist".

At the age of 40, Ling was diagnosed with attention deficit hyperactivity disorder.

== Published works ==
- Ling, Laura; Ling, Lisa (2010). Somewhere Inside: One Sister's Captivity in North Korea and the Other's Fight to Bring Her Home. William Morrow. ISBN 978-0062000675.

Media offices
Preceded by Debbie Matenopoulos	The View co-host 1999–2002	Succeeded by Elisabeth Hasselbeck
