= LeAlan Jones =

American journalist

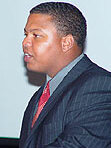

Personal details
- Born: May 8, 1979 (age 47) Chicago, Illinois, U.S.
- Party: Green Party
- Occupation: Journalist, Football Coach/Trainer

LeAlan Marvin Jones (born May 8, 1979) is an American journalist who lives in Chicago's South Shore. His radio documentaries have received critical acclaim and numerous awards. Jones was the Green Party's 2010 nominee for United States Senate from Illinois.

== Early life ==
Jones grew up on the South Side of Chicago, a block from the Ida B. Wells housing project. He was raised by his grandparents, Gus and June Jones, in the same house his family had lived in since the 1930s. He was a junior spokesperson for the No Dope Express Foundation, a youth education and anti-drug organization.

At the age of 13, Jones and his friend Lloyd Newman created a radio documentary for NPR titled Ghetto Life 101. Jones was contacted by David Isay, who was producing a piece on poverty for Chicago Public Radio station WBEZ. The documentary illustrated life in the South Side of Chicago in 1993. The recordings made by the duo centered around interviews with the boys' families, friends, and members of the community. The broadcast was well received, and praised for its raw portrayal of life in the projects in Chicago. It won several awards, including the Sigma Delta Chi Award, and the Corporation for Public Broadcasting's Awards for Excellence in Documentary Radio and Special Achievement in Radio Programming.

Jones and Newman made a second documentary in 1994, The 14 Stories of Eric Morse, which explored the backgrounds of the people involved with Eric Morse, a five-year-old boy who was tragically thrown from a fourteenth-story window in the Chicago projects by two older boys. The documentary premiered on NPR's All Things Considered in 1996. It won the Robert F. Kennedy Journalism Award and a Peabody Award.

External videos
- Booknotes interview with Jones on Our America: Life and Death on the South Side of Chicago, August 3, 1997, C-SPAN

The two documentaries and further footage from when Jones and Newman were nearing high school graduation were condensed into a book published in 1997 titled Our America: Life and Death on the South Side of Chicago.

Jones graduated from Chicago's Dr. Martin Luther King High School in 1997. He studied criminology at Florida State University where he became a member of Kappa Alpha Psi in the Spring of 1998 before transferring to Barat College in Lake Forest, Illinois in 2001. He received a B.A. in Interdisciplinary Studies in Social Science.

Jones is the visionary for the Aspiring Youth Take A Student To your Employment (TASTE) Program. The Take A Student To your Employment Program was created after Jones spoke to Aspiring Youth students in Chicago. He thought that while it is helpful for students to hear from inspiring speakers, the students would benefit even more if they could visit workplaces to see why school is important and what they need to do with their education to get a good job someday. The TASTE Program has brought more than 13,500 students to workplaces nationwide.

== 2010 U.S. Senate campaign ==
At the height of the Rod Blagojevich scandal, Jones made the decision to run for United States Senate. In 2009, he announced his candidacy in the 2010 election for the seat currently held by Roland Burris. Burris, who was appointed by Governor Blagojevich to fill the seat vacated by Barack Obama following Obama's election as President of the United States, chose not to seek re-election.

Jones ran unopposed in the Green Party primary and gained the nomination. He ran against Republican Mark Kirk, Democrat Alexi Giannoulias, and Libertarian Mike Labno in the general election in November 2010.

An early May poll saw Jones receiving 5% of the vote. Following the controversy over Mark Kirk embellishing his military record, Jones saw a spike in his poll numbers. A June survey made by Public Policy Polling saw Jones picking up 14% of the vote behind Mark Kirk's 30% and Alexi Giannoulias with 31%. Jones finished with 3.18% of the vote.

== 2013 special election in Illinois's 2nd congressional district ==
Due to the November 21, 2012 resignation of Rep. Jesse Jackson Jr. from the U.S. House of Representatives, Illinois Governor Pat Quinn was obligated to set a date for a special election for the citizens of Illinois's 2nd congressional district.

On December 4, 2012, the Illinois Green Party nominated Jones as its candidate to represent the 2nd congressional district in the U.S. House. On December 17, 2012, the Illinois Green Party filed a lawsuit regarding the ballot access requirements necessary to be on the ballot in this election.

== Political views ==
Jones has called for the immediate ratification of UNICEF's Convention on the Rights of the Child, a ban on land mines and complete nuclear disarmament. He supported troop withdrawal from, and ending the wars in Afghanistan and Iraq.

He has been critical of credit default swaps, derivatives trading and the financial industry as a whole, saying "a bunch of guys on Wall Street have done more to devastate the white community than any black man ever could." He is in favor of the decriminalization and taxation of marijuana and the creation of cooperatives and credit unions as measures to bolster the economy.

== Bibliography ==
- Ghetto Life 101. 1993. National Public Radio.
- Remorse: The 14 Stories of Eric Morse. 1996. National Public Radio.
- Our America: Life and Death on the South Side of Chicago (with co-authors Lloyd Newman, David Isay and John Anthony Brooks) Simon and Schuster. 1998. ISBN 978-0-671-00464-4
- Out of the Ghetto. 2008. BBC World Service.

Party political offices
Preceded by First	Green nominee for U.S. Senator from Illinois (Class 3); 2010	Succeeded by Scott Summers
