= Mark Tymchyshyn =

American actor (born 1958)

- Born: July 30, 1958 (age 68); Minneapolis, Minnesota, U.S.
- Other name: Mark Tymchyshym
- Education: Wayne State University
- Occupation: Actor
- Years active: 1984–present

Mark Tymchyshyn (born July 30, 1958) is an American actor perhaps best known for his role in George Lopez as Mel Powers, a factory owner. Tymchyshyn is a graduate of Wayne State University (Michigan).

== Career ==
He directed A Lie of the Mind with playwright Sam Shepard. He also has cameo roles in shows such as ER, Diagnosis: Murder, Monk, Seinfeld, The Drew Carey Show, and Boston Legal. From 1990 to 1992, he played Gavin Kruger in the daytime drama As the World Turns and also appeared in an episode of Malcolm in the Middle in 2000. He originally intended to become a teacher, but is now both an actor and professor.

== Filmography ==
Year	Title	Role	Notes
1987	Hollywood Erotic Film Festival	Billy	(segment: Video Store Sequences)
1991	He Said, She Said	Steve	
2001	The Sleepy Time Gal	Larry Mosher	
2007	Lucky You	Tournament Official	
2013	Savannah	Peter Scardino	
