= David Shadrack Smith =

American documentary filmmaker and television producer

David Shadrack Smith is an American documentary filmmaker, director, and television producer. Working under the banner of Part2 Pictures, Smith has directed and produced documentary films and television series for CNN, Hulu, National Geographic, PBS, Showtime, Discovery Channel, and the History Channel.

His work spans investigative journalism, science, culture, food, and social history. Smith is known for directing and producing projects including Afghan Warrior, Hard Time, Engineering Ground Zero, Belief, This Is Life with Lisa Ling, Dark Net, Taste the Nation with Padma Lakshmi, and Public Access.

In 2026, Smith's feature documentary Public Access premiered in the U.S. Documentary Competition at the Sundance Film Festival before screening at the Hot Docs Canadian International Documentary Festival.

== Career ==
Smith began his career in journalism and documentary production before establishing himself as a director and producer of factual television and documentary films.

Among his early directing credits was The Revolution, a documentary series for the History Channel chronicling the American Revolutionary War. He later directed Afghan Warrior (2009), a National Geographic documentary following photographer Reza Deghati's return to Afghanistan. The documentary received a News & Documentary Emmy Award.

Smith created and directed Hard Time, a documentary series for National Geographic examining life inside correctional facilities across the United States. He also served as executive producer on documentary features including The Redemption of General Butt Naked (2011) and An Honest Liar (2014).

In 2012, Smith directed and executive produced Engineering Ground Zero, a PBS Nova documentary examining the rebuilding of the World Trade Center site following the September 11 attacks. The program received a News & Documentary Emmy Award nomination.

Smith directed and executive produced Belief (2015), a documentary series for OWN exploring religious practices and spiritual traditions around the world.

From 2010 through 2022, Smith served as director and executive producer of CNN's This Is Life with Lisa Ling, an investigative documentary series examining contemporary social and cultural issues. The series received recognition from the International Documentary Association.

He also executive produced CNN's Chasing Life with Dr. Sanjay Gupta and directed and executive produced Showtime's Dark Net, a documentary series exploring the impact of technology on contemporary life.

Beginning in 2020, Smith directed and executive produced Hulu's Taste the Nation with Padma Lakshmi, a documentary series exploring American food culture through immigrant, Indigenous, and regional traditions. The series received recognition from the Television Academy, the Gotham Awards, and the James Beard Foundation.

Smith also executive produced PBS's America Outdoors with Baratunde Thurston, which received recognition from the International Documentary Association.

In 2024, Smith executive produced World Eats Bread, which received a James Beard Media Award.

== Public Access ==
Smith directed Public Access (2026), a feature documentary examining the history of public-access television in New York City and its influence on contemporary media culture. Executive produced by Benny Safdie and Steve Buscemi, the film premiered in the U.S. Documentary Competition at the 2026 Sundance Film Festival before screening at the Hot Docs Canadian International Documentary Festival.

The film received positive critical attention following its premiere, with coverage appearing in The New York Times, IndieWire, Screen Daily, Vulture, and USA Today.
