= Han Park =

American academic

Han S. Park
- Born: China
- Education: Seoul National University, B.A. American University, M.A. University of Minnesota, PhD
- Occupation(s): Professor, scholar of global peace and North Korea
- Employer: University of Georgia
- Notable work: North Korea: The Politics of Unconventional Wisdom (2002)
- Title: Professor Emeritus of International Affairs at the University of Georgia

Han Park is a scholar of global peace and North Korea–United States relations. He is a Professor Emeritus of International Affairs at the University of Georgia.

== Life and career ==
Park was born in China to Korean parents. He received a B.A. in political science from Seoul National University, an M.A. in political science from American University, and a PhD in political science from the University of Minnesota.

Park has played the role of an unofficial peacemaker and mediator between the United States and North Korea. He has at times worked with the U.S. Department of State and former president Jimmy Carter. Park is the former director of the Center for the Study of Global Issues at the University of Georgia.

Park traveled to North Korea during the 2009 imprisonment of American journalists by North Korea. In 2013, he wrote an opinion piece for the Athens Banner-Herald about the role of the United States in peacemaking during the 2012–2013 escalation of the Syrian civil war.

== Selected publications ==
- Human Needs and Political Development (1984)
- China and North Korea (co-authored, 1990)
- North Korea: Ideology, Politics, Economy (edited, 1996)
- North Korea: The Politics of Unconventional Wisdom (2002)
- North Korea Demystified (2012)
