= David Isay =

American radio producer (born 1965)

- Born: David Avram Isay; December 5, 1965 (age 60); New Haven, Connecticut, U.S.
- Occupation: Radio producer
- Known for: Founder of StoryCorps
- Website: storycorps.org

David Avram "Dave" Isay (born December 5, 1965) is an American radio producer and founder of Sound Portraits Productions. He is also the founder of StoryCorps, an ongoing oral history project. He is the recipient of numerous broadcasting honors, including six Peabody Awards and a MacArthur "Genius" Fellowship. He is the author/editor of numerous books that grew out of his public radio documentary work.

Since 2003, StoryCorps has collected and archived interviews with more than 645,000 participants. Each conversation is preserved at the American Folklife Center at the Library of Congress. StoryCorps is the largest single collection of personal narratives ever gathered, and millions listen to StoryCorps' weekly broadcasts on NPR's Morning Edition and visit its website, www.storycorps.org.

== History ==
David Isay grew up in New Haven, Connecticut, and Manhattan, New York. He is the son of the psychiatrist Richard Isay and book editor and author Jane Isay. He graduated from Friends Seminary in 1983 and New York University in 1987.

Isay produced a wide variety of programs for NPR, including the Yiddish Radio Project with Henry Sapoznik, salvaging recordings of Victor Packer. He also produced "The Execution Tapes," nineteen recordings of the 23 electrocutions carried out by the state of Georgia since 1984.

Isay received a MacArthur "Genius" fellowship as a radio documentary producer before he started StoryCorps.

In 2003, Isay set up an oral history recording booth inside Grand Central Terminal, in New York City. He recruited oral historian Studs Terkel of Chicago to cut the ceremonial ribbon for the opening of StoryCorps' first booth. Today, StoryCorps has recording booths in Atlanta, Chicago and San Francisco. In 2005, StoryCorps converted two Airstream trailers into traveling recording studios—its MobileBooths—launching its first cross-country tour. In 2010, StoryCorps began animating a selection of their interviews with the Rauch brothers, thus making the leap from radio broadcast to television on shows like PBS' POV and online animated videos.

Isay is also a member of the Peabody Awards board of directors, which are presented by the University of Georgia's Henry W. Grady College of Journalism and Mass Communication.

== Awards ==
- 2015 TED Prize
- 2006 Rockefeller Fellow
- 2001 The Hillman Prize with Stacy Abramson for "Witness to an Execution" segment on NPR's All Things Considered
- 2000 MacArthur Fellows Program
- 1996 The Hillman Prize with LeAlan Jones and Lloyd Newman for "Remorse: The 14 Stories of Eric Morse" segment on NPR's All Things Considered
- 1994 Guggenheim Fellow
- Four Peabody Awards
- Two Robert F. Kennedy Journalism Awards

== Books ==
- Callings: The Purpose and Passion of Work, David Isay, Penguin Group, 19 April 2016, ISBN 1-59420-518-3
- Ties That Bind: Stories of Love and Gratitude From The First Ten Years of StoryCorps Editor David Isay with Lizzie Jacobs, Penguin Group, 2013, ISBN 978-1-101-63876-7
- All There Is: Love Stories from StoryCorps, Editor David Isay, Penguin Group, 2012, ISBN 978-1-101-55637-5
- Mom: A Celebration of Mothers from StoryCorps, Editor David Isay, Penguin Group, 2010, ISBN 978-0-14-311880-0
- Listening Is an Act of Love: A Celebration of American Life from the Storycorps Project, Editor David Isay, Penguin Group, 2007, ISBN 978-1-59420-140-0
- Our America: Life and Death on the South Side of Chicago, Authors LeAlan Jones, Lloyd Newman, David Isay, Photographs John Anthony Brooks, Simon and Schuster, 1998, ISBN 978-0-671-00464-4
- Holding On: Dreamers, Visionaries, Eccentrics, and Other American Heroes, Authors David Isay, Photographs Harvey Wang, W. W. Norton & Company, Incorporated, 1997, ISBN 978-0-393-31608-7
- 12 American Voices: An Authentic Listening and Integrated-Skills Text, Authors Maurice Cogan Hauck, Kenneth MacDougall, David Isay, Yale University Press, 2001, ISBN 978-0-300-08960-8
