= Duster =

Duster or dusters may refer to:

== People ==
- Alfreda Duster (1904–1983), Chicago-based social worker and civic leader, daughter of civil rights activist Ida B. Wells-Barnett, mother of academician Troy Barnett (below)
- Anthony Duster Bennett (1946–1976), British blues singer and musician
- Troy Duster, American sociologist, grandson of grandson Ida B. Wells-Barnett, son of Alfred Duster (above)
- Joseph Dusty Hill (1949–2021), also known as Duster, bassist, keyboardist, and co-vocalist with the American rock group ZZ Top
- John Duster Mails (1894–1974), American Major League Baseball pitcher

== Arts and entertainment ==
- Duster (band), an American slowcore band
  - Duster (Duster album), 2019
- Duster (Gary Burton album), 1967
- The Dusters, a Nashville-based blues rock trio
- Duster (Mother 3), a main character in the game Mother 3
- Duster (TV series), a 2025 American crime thriller on Max
- Duster (Graphic Novel), a 2015 American WW2 adventure story created and written by Micah Wright and Jay Lender, ISBN 978-1-942749-82-0

== Cleaning implements ==
- A device used for dusting (housekeeping)
  - Feather duster, used for housecleaning
  - Gas duster, used to clean electronics or abused as an inhalant drug
- A chalkboard eraser

== Sports teams ==
- Amarillo Dusters, original name of the Amarillo Venom indoor football team
- Binghamton Dusters, an ice hockey team in the American Hockey League
- Broome Dusters, a former ice hockey team in the North American Hockey League

== Vehicles ==
- Crop duster, an airplane used for aerial application of pesticides
- Dacia Duster, a Romanian compact sport utility vehicle
- DSK Duster, a glider
- Plymouth Duster, an American automobile

== Weapons ==
- Knuckle dusters, another name for brass knuckles
- M42 Duster, a self-propelled anti-aircraft gun

== Other uses ==
- Duster, Texas, United States, an unincorporated community
- Duster (clothing), a long, loose coat or housecoat
- Hudson Dusters, a New York City street gang in the early twentieth century

== See also ==
- Red Duster (disambiguation)
