= David Benjamin Oppenheimer =

American legal scholar (born 1950)

David B. Oppenheimer
- Born: David Bruce Oppenheimer; 18 March 1950 (age 76)
- Education: University Without Walls (BA); Harvard Law School (JD)
- Occupations: Law professor, civil rights lawyer
- Employer: UC Berkeley School of Law
- Known for: Comparative equality law; history of the diversity rationale
- Notable work: The Diversity Principle (2026); Whitewashing Race (2003)
- Spouse: Marcy Diane Kates
- Relatives: Michael F. Oppenheimer (brother); Amy J. Oppenheimer (sister)

David Benjamin Oppenheimer (born David Bruce Oppenheimer; 18 March 1950) is an American legal scholar and civil rights lawyer who is a clinical professor of law at Berkeley Law. He is the founder and co-director of the Berkeley Center on Comparative Equality and Anti-Discrimination Law and the faculty co-director of Berkeley Law's pro bono program. He is the author or editor of nine books on civil rights and discrimination law, including the first U.S. law school casebook in comparative equality law and The Diversity Principle: The Story of a Transformative Idea (2026), a history of the idea that diversity improves learning and decision-making.

== Early life and education ==
Oppenheimer was born David Bruce Oppenheimer and changed his middle name to Benjamin in 1968. He attended the New Lincoln School in New York City. He has said that "the cause of racial justice is responsible for his existence": his grandparents Harry Centennial Oppenheimer and Amy Vorhaus Oppenheimer were each troubled by the 1915 release of The Birth of a Nation and independently reached out to Booker T. Washington, who then introduced them to each other.

He graduated from the University Without Walls in Berkeley in 1972 with a degree in political science, and received his J.D. from Harvard Law School in 1978, where he was a research assistant to Laurence Tribe.

== Career ==
=== Early legal career ===
Following graduation in 1978, Oppenheimer clerked for the Chief Justice of California, Rose Elizabeth Bird. From 1979 to 1986 he worked as a civil rights prosecutor (staff attorney) for the California Department of Fair Employment and Housing, handling discrimination cases; he was lead counsel in twelve published decisions of the California Fair Employment and Housing Commission. In 1982, he founded the employment discrimination clinic at Boalt Hall (now Berkeley Law), serving as its director until 1986 while teaching as a lecturer in law. From 1990 to 1992 he also served as a judge pro tem of the Oakland-Piedmont-Emeryville Municipal Court.

=== Academic career ===
In 1987 Oppenheimer joined the University of San Francisco School of Law as an assistant clinical professor, and he taught at John F. Kennedy University from 1990 to 1991. He joined Golden Gate University School of Law in 1991, becoming a full professor in 1998, and served as associate dean for academic affairs (2000–2005) and associate dean for faculty development (2005–2009). From 2005 to 2009 he co-directed Golden Gate's summer program in comparative law with the University of Paris X (Nanterre).

After visiting appointments at Berkeley Law in 1998, 2000 and 2008, he returned to Berkeley Law in 2009 as Clinical Professor of Law and Director of Professional Skills, a post he held until 2015. He currently teaches civil procedure, evidence, and comparative equality and anti-discrimination law, and has also taught employment discrimination law, sex discrimination law, trial advocacy, and oral advocacy.

He has served as a visiting professor or scholar at Sciences Po (2012, 2013; visiting scholar, 2022), the University of Paris I (Panthéon-Sorbonne) (2014, 2015, 2018, 2022), LUMSA Rome (2014), the University of Bologna (2010), University College London (2023), and Queen Mary University of London, where he was a Distinguished Visiting Scholar in 2023.

=== Teaching ===
Oppenheimer designed and co-hosted a 16-hour web course on comparative equality law produced by Stanford Law School. During the COVID-19 pandemic he created synchronous, multi-university online courses on COVID-19 and Global Inequalities and on Comparative Equality Law, taught jointly with partner universities on several continents. He is also the author of simulated case files used to teach litigation skills, including Rowe v. Pacific Quad for the National Institute for Trial Advocacy (six editions, 1986–2020) and Patt v. Donner for teaching civil procedure (2014; 2nd ed. 2019).

== Berkeley Center on Comparative Equality and Anti-Discrimination Law ==
In 2011, Oppenheimer founded the Berkeley Center on Comparative Equality and Anti-Discrimination Law at the encouragement of then-dean Christopher Edley Jr. He co-directs the center, which includes over 1,200 scholars, advocates, and activists from every continent except Antarctica. The center has facilitated the publication of webinars, books, and conferences by bringing together scholars and advocates from around the world focused on equality law, and has developed online multi-university courses on equality law with universities around the globe. Its working groups address gender-based harassment and violence, global systemic racism, disability rights, LGBTQI+ rights, migration and equality, pay equity and living wages, intersectional class discrimination, equity and criminal justice, digital equality, and climate equality.

The center holds an annual conference hosted by a member university: Paris (2012), Berkeley (2013), Brussels (2014), Shanghai (2016), Dublin (2017), Melbourne (2018), Stockholm (2019), Cape Town (2021), Hong Kong (2022), Utrecht (2023), Bengaluru (2024), Ljubljana (2025), and Viterbo, Italy (2026). With the center, Oppenheimer has organized conferences on gender discrimination, harassment, and violence, including a 2018 Berkeley Law conference on the globalization of the #MeToo movement that led to the edited volume The Global #MeToo Movement (2020), and conferences on global systemic racism in Paris in 2022 and 2024. Oppenheimer also mentors young scholars and students at Berkeley and around the globe.

== Litigation and advocacy ==
Oppenheimer has litigated sexual harassment, pay equity and other forms of sex discrimination cases, as well as race, ethnicity, disability, religious, and age discrimination cases. Before the Supreme Court of California, he argued on behalf of amici curiae in Commodore Home Systems v. Superior Court (1982), which held that punitive damages are available in civil actions for employment discrimination, and represented amicus curiae Women's Employment Rights Clinic in Farmers Insurance Group v. County of Santa Clara (1995). He was trial counsel for the plaintiff in Presta v. Peninsula Corridor Joint Powers Board (N.D. Cal. 1998), in which the court held that proof of discriminatory intent is not required under California's Unruh Civil Rights Act.

In the U.S. Supreme Court, he served as counsel for amicus curiae National Employment Lawyers Association in Burlington Industries v. Ellerth (1998) and as a consultant to its counsel in Faragher v. City of Boca Raton (1998). In Students for Fair Admissions v. Harvard (2023), he was counsel of record for a group of deans of U.S. law schools, whose amicus brief, filed in support of the respondent universities, addressed the history of the diversity rationale for race-conscious admissions. He has also filed amicus briefs in the Supreme Court of Japan, on behalf of the Berkeley Center, in a 2021 defamation case, and in the Inter-American Commission on Human Rights regarding the fatal beating of Anastasio Hernández Rojas by U.S. border agents.

In 2023, he was lead trial counsel for the plaintiff in Cheung v. Howard Hughes Medical Institute, a race, ethnicity, gender, and disability discrimination case tried to a jury in the Circuit Court for Montgomery County, Maryland; the jury returned a verdict for the defense, and the Supreme Court of Maryland granted review of the plaintiff's appeal, which it is scheduled to hear in December 2026.

During the 1996 campaign over California Proposition 209, Oppenheimer was a prominent opponent of the measure, debating its proponents at law schools, bar associations, and on radio and television, and he later represented the American Jewish Congress as amicus curiae in the Ninth Circuit challenge to the initiative, Coalition for Economic Equity v. Wilson.

== Scholarship ==
Oppenheimer has written or edited nine books as well as scores of scholarly papers and articles. His work focuses on U.S. civil rights history, racism, anti-discrimination law, and comparative equality law. His article "Negligent Discrimination" in the University of Pennsylvania Law Review (1993) is regarded as part of the established canon for discrimination law. He has also written on the history of the civil rights movement, including the events surrounding Martin Luther King Jr.'s "Letter from Birmingham Jail" and the introduction of the Civil Rights Act of 1964.

His co-authored book Comparative Equality & Anti-Discrimination Law: Cases, Codes, Constitutions & Commentary (2012; 3rd ed. 2020) is the first U.S. textbook on comparative anti-discrimination law. His co-authored Whitewashing Race: The Myth of a Color-Blind Society (2003; 2nd ed. 2023) won the 2004 Benjamin L. Hooks Outstanding Book Award and was a finalist for the 2004 C. Wright Mills Award.

He has written opinion pieces for the Los Angeles Times, The Boston Globe, The National Law Journal, the San Francisco Chronicle, and the San Francisco Examiner.

=== The Diversity Principle ===
Oppenheimer is best known for his research on the origins of diversity policies. He has said that he once regarded diversity as an idea devised in the 1970s to justify affirmative action, and that he was initially skeptical of diversity efforts, concerned that they amounted to tokenism; after a colleague challenged him to look more closely, he began what he has called a fifteen-year research journey into the idea's history. Along the way he published articles on the role of Archibald Cox and on the South African and European sources of the diversity justification for affirmative action, and in The New Yorker, Nicholas Lemann described him as the "diversity detective" for these historical accounts.

The research culminated in The Diversity Principle: The Story of a Transformative Idea, published by Yale University Press in February 2026. The book traces the idea across roughly two centuries: from Wilhelm von Humboldt's founding of the University of Berlin in 1810, which admitted Catholic and Jewish students, through John Stuart Mill and Harriet Taylor Mill's On Liberty and Charles Eliot's reshaping of Harvard, to the legal work of Pauli Murray, Thurgood Marshall, and Ruth Bader Ginsburg. Oppenheimer argues that diversity began as a theory of knowledge, holding that people of different backgrounds and experiences learn more and make better decisions together, rather than as a remedy for discrimination, and that empirical research has increasingly supported it. The book was discussed in Forbes by Marybeth Gasman and in an interview with Inside Higher Ed senior editor Susan H. Greenberg. Oppenheimer presented the book in the United States at venues including the Commonwealth Club of California and the New York Public Library, and on public radio programs including WNYC's The Brian Lehrer Show. In Europe, he presented it at the Université libre de Bruxelles, Sciences Po, the American Library in Paris, University College London, the National Liberal Club, the University of Oxford, the University of Cambridge, and Humboldt University of Berlin. His next project is a legal history of the influence of Pauli Murray.

=== Selected works ===
==== Books ====
- The Diversity Principle: The Story of a Transformative Idea. Yale University Press, 2026.
- Comparative Equality and Anti-Discrimination Law: Cases, Codes, Constitutions & Commentary (with Sheila R. Foster, Sora Y. Han and Richard T. Ford). 3rd ed. Edward Elgar, 2020 (1st ed. Foundation Press, 2012; 2nd ed. 2017).
- Rowe v. Pacific Quad: Problems, Teaching Notes and Casefile (with Fred Moss). 6th ed. National Institute for Trial Advocacy, 2020 (1st ed. 1986).
- The Global #MeToo Movement (co-edited with Ann Noel). Full Court Press, 2020.
- Patt v. Donner: A Simulated Casefile for Learning Civil Procedure (with Molly Leiwant, Rebecca Schonberg and Sam Wheeler). 2nd ed. Foundation Press, 2019 (1st ed. 2014).
- The Ubiquity of Positive Measures for Addressing Systemic Discrimination and Inequality: A Comparative Global Perspective. Brill, 2019.
- Comparative Perspectives on the Enforcement and Effectiveness of Antidiscrimination Law: Challenges and Innovative Tools (co-edited with Marie Mercat-Bruns and Cady Sartorius). Springer, 2018.
- The Great Dissents of the Lone Dissenter: The Dissenting Opinions of Justice Jesse W. Carter (co-edited with Alan Brotsky). Carolina Academic Press, 2010.
- Whitewashing Race: The Myth of a Color-Blind Society (with Michael K. Brown, Martin Carnoy, Elliott Currie, Troy Duster, Marjorie M. Shultz and David Wellman). University of California Press, 2003 (2nd ed. 2023).

==== Selected articles ====
- "Negligent Discrimination". University of Pennsylvania Law Review 141: 899 (1993).
- "Martin Luther King, Walker v. City of Birmingham, and the Letter from Birmingham Jail". U.C. Davis Law Review 26: 791 (1993).
- "Kennedy, King, Shuttlesworth and Walker: The Events Leading to the Introduction of the Civil Rights Act of 1964". University of San Francisco Law Review 29: 645 (1995).
- "Exacerbating the Exasperating: Title VII Liability of Employers for Sexual Harassment Committed by Their Supervisors". Cornell Law Review 81: 66 (1995).
- "Verdicts Matter: An Empirical Study of California Employment Discrimination and Wrongful Discharge Jury Verdicts Reveals Low Success Rates for Women and Minorities". U.C. Davis Law Review 37: 511 (2003).
- "Archibald Cox and the Diversity Justification for Affirmative Action". Virginia Journal of Social Policy & the Law 25: 157 (2018).
- "Dr. King's Dream of Affirmative Action". Harvard Latinx Law Review 21: 56 (2018).
- "The South African Sources of the Diversity Justification for U.S. Affirmative Action". California Law Review Online (2022).
- "Teaching Law Across Six Continents: A Multi-University Course on Comparative Equality Law" (with Panos Kapotas and Laura Carlson). Journal of Legal Education 72: 113 (2024).

== Professional affiliations ==
Oppenheimer has been a member of the American Law Institute since 2004. From 2022 to 2025 he served on the International Advisory Board of RE-WIRING, a European Commission-funded project on gender equality. He is a former board member of the ACLU of Northern California (1989–2000, 2007–2008, 2013–2014), the Lawyers' Committee for Civil Rights of the San Francisco Bay Area (1997–2006), Equal Rights Advocates (1998–2001), and the Society of American Law Teachers (1997–2001). He was vice-chair of the pro bono committee of the American Bar Association's Section of International Law (2011–2016) and faculty co-director of Berkeley Law's Thelton Henderson Center for Social Justice (2016–2018), and has served on UC Berkeley's Committee for the Protection of Human Subjects. He has been a member of the State Bar of California since 1978 and of the U.S. Supreme Court Bar since 1998.

== Personal life ==
Oppenheimer is married to Marcy Diane Kates; in 2025 he adopted her two children. His brother, Michael F. Oppenheimer, is an international affairs specialist and clinical professor at New York University's Center for Global Affairs. His sister, Amy J. Oppenheimer, a retired administrative law judge and a founding partner of Oppenheimer Investigations Group, a Berkeley law firm, is also a playwright and actress.
