= You scratch my back =

You scratch my back may refer to:

- You Scratch My Back, Batman episode
- Quid pro quo form of exchange of goods or services, by the phrase "you scratch my back, and I'll scratch yours"
