= Appeal to advantage =

Rhetorical appeal to audience's interest

An appeal to advantage is a rhetorical device in which the speaker encourages his or her audience to perform some action by representing that action as being in the audience's best interest.

It can be stated in the positive, and in negative terms, that is, a disadvantage, as Saint Paul did in both ways.

An appeal to advantage can also be a request from someone in a position of power to someone who is in a socially subordinate position; the request is specifically for the subordinate to perform an act contrary to the subordinate's wishes, such that the subordinate is forced to commit the act in order to satisfy a more significant need. The appeal is specifically most expedient or advantageous to the person in power, but is also presented as forwarding the subordinate's interests in some significant way.

== Examples ==
- A client offers a government official a big amount of money, provided the official facilitates or gives a favorable decision on some transactions in which the client has some interest.
- A rich man offers to pay the hospital bills for a beautiful young girl's sick mother, provided that the girl chooses to become his mistress.
- A religious political leader offers a person a job, provided that the person joins his religion and accepts his beliefs.
- A wealthy politician persuades uneducated, working class voters to support him, against their own interests.

== See also ==
- Blackmail
- Bribery
- Over a barrel
- Rhetoric
- Quid pro quo
