= Bragdon v. Abbott =

- Supreme Court of the United States

Argued March 30, 1998 Decided June 25, 1998
- Full case name: Randon Bragdon, Petitioner v. Sidney Abbott, et al.
- Citations: 524 U.S. 624 (more) 118 S. Ct. 2196; 141 L. Ed. 2d 540; 1998 U.S. LEXIS 4212; 66 U.S.L.W. 4601; 8 Am. Disabilities Cas. (BNA) 239; 98 Cal. Daily Op. Service 5021; 98 Daily Journal DAR 6973; 1998 Colo. J. C.A.R. 3268;11 Fla. L. Weekly Fed. S 726

Case history
- Prior: On writ of certiorari to the United States Court of Appeals for the First Circuit

Holding
- The Court held that reproduction does qualify as a major life activity according to Americans with Disabilities Act of 1990.

Court membership
- Chief Justice William Rehnquist Associate Justices John P. Stevens · Sandra Day O'Connor; Antonin Scalia · Anthony Kennedy; David Souter · Clarence Thomas; Ruth Bader Ginsburg · Stephen Breyer

Case opinions
- Majority: Kennedy, joined by Stevens, Souter, Ginsburg, Breyer
- Concurrence: Stevens, joined by Breyer
- Concurrence: Ginsburg
- Concur/dissent: Rehnquist, joined by Scalia, Thomas; O'Connor (part II)
- Concur/dissent: O'Connor

Laws applied
- Americans with Disabilities Act of 1990

Bragdon v. Abbott, 524 U.S. 624 (1998), was a case in which the Supreme Court of the United States held that reproduction does qualify as a major life activity according to the Americans with Disabilities Act of 1990 (ADA).

== Background ==
Sidney Abbott, after disclosing on a form that she was 'asymptomatic' HIV positive, was refused service from her dentist, Randon Bragdon, to fill a cavity. Bragdon submitted that he would agree to fill the cavity if he could perform the work in a hospital setting, but that Abbott would have to pay for the expense of being admitted and using the facility. Abbott sued Bragdon on grounds of discrimination, citing the Americans with Disabilities Act of 1990. The case was appealed through the court system and eventually was agreed to be heard by the Supreme Court. Abbott's case was based on the argument that she was a victim of discrimination based on the ADA. Abbott argued that HIV created a “substantial limitation” to life activities, specifically, reproductive ability. Bragdon, the defendant, retorted that HIV posed a “direct threat” to his health and safety, but that he was willing to work on Abbott should he be able to take “extra precautions” in a hospital setting. Federal trial courts, as well as appellate courts ruled in favor of Abbott.

== Issue ==
The major issues that were heard and decided upon by the Supreme Court included: whether HIV is a disability and reproduction a major life activity under the ADA. Accordingly, can a physician refuse or alter care of a patient with HIV without violating portions of the ADA?

== Decision ==
The United States Supreme Court ruled that reproduction does qualify as a major life activity under the Americans with Disabilities Act (ADA), and that even asymptomatic HIV would qualify Abbott to claim protection under the act. The Court held that the ADA does not force care-givers to treat those who pose a direct threat and that health care professionals may not be granted deference to their views when serving as a defendant in cases of alleged discrimination. The holding does not effect a blanket protection under the ADA to all persons with HIV.

== Reason ==
The Court utilized the Americans with Disabilities Act of 1990, which aimed to eliminate discrimination towards people with disabilities in the workplace, public areas and by government entities. That includes discrimination towards people with actual disabilities and persons who are regarded or treated as if they have a disability. Specific to the case, the ADA stipulates that those with disabilities cannot be discriminated against medical treatment. In order to receive protection from the ADA, Abbott was required to show that she had an impairment, and that it substantially limited a major life activity, on which the Court sided with her claim.

== See also ==
- List of United States Supreme Court cases, volume 524
- List of United States Supreme Court cases
- Lists of United States Supreme Court cases by volume
