= Troy Duster =

American sociologist

Troy S. Duster
- Born: Troy Smith Duster; July 11, 1936 (age 90); Chicago, Illinois, U.S.
- Education: Northwestern University (BA, PhD); University of California, Los Angeles (MA)
- Mother: Alfreda Duster
- Relatives: Ida B. Wells (grandmother), Ferdinand Lee Barnett (grandfather)
- Awards: Guggenheim Fellowship
- Scientific career
- Fields: Sociology
- Workplaces: University of California, Berkeley; New York University
- Thesis: The Social Response to Abnormality (1962)
- Doctoral advisor: Raymond Mack

Troy Smith Duster (born July 11, 1936) is an American sociologist with research interests in science, law, ethnicity and deviance. He is an emeritus Chancellor's Professor of sociology at University of California, Berkeley, and emeritus professor of sociology and former director of the Institute for the History of the Production of Knowledge at New York University. Duster is on the faculty advisor boards of the Berkeley Center for Social Medicine and the Berkeley Center for Right-Wing Studies.

In 1970, Duster published The Legislation of Morality, in which he showed how hundreds of thousands of previously law-abiding drug addicts became associated with the deviant and criminal segment of society after the United States Supreme Court in Webb v. United States interpreted the Harrison Narcotic Law (1914) to prohibit physician prescriptions for the maintenance of existing physical opiate dependence. It was easier, Duster concluded, for middle America to direct its moral hostility "toward a young, lower-class Negro male than toward a middle-aged white female". He contributed to the book White-Washing Race: The Myth of a Color-blind Society (2005).

From 2004 to 2005, Duster served as president of the American Sociological Association. He was also a contributing member of the International HapMap Project, an organization that worked to develop the first haplotype map of the human genome.

He is the grandson of civil rights activist Ida B. Wells.

== Education ==
Troy Duster is the son of Alfreda Duster (née Barnett) and Benjamin C. Duster Jr. and grandson of Ida B. Wells. He was able to go to university through the Pullman Foundation Scholarship, a scholarship for minority and impoverished students. Duster attended Northwestern University, where he earned his bachelor's degree in sociology in 1957.

Duster then went to the University of California, Los Angeles, for graduate school, earning a master's degree in sociology in 1959. He then returned to Northwestern and received a PhD in sociology in 1962.

== Publications ==
- Brown, M. K.; Carnoy, M.; Currie, E.; Duster, T.; Oppenheimer, D.B.; Schultz, M.M.; Wellman, D. (2005). Whitewashing Race: The Myth of a Color-blind Society. Berkeley: University of California Press. ISBN 978-0-520-24475-7.
- "Selective Arrests, an Ever-Expanding DNA Forensic Database, and the Specter of an Early Twenty-First Century Equivalent of Phrenology," in David Lazer, ed., DNA and the Criminal Justice System: The Technology of Justice, Cambridge, Mass.: MIT Press, 2004, 315–334
- Duster, Troy (2003). Backdoor to Eugenics. New York: Routledge. ISBN 978-0-415-94674-2.
- "The Hidden Eugenic Potential of Germ-Line Interventions," in Audrey R. Chapman and Mark S. Frankel, eds., Designing our Descendants: The Promises and Perils of Genetic Modifications, Baltimore and London: The Johns Hopkins University Press, 2003, 156–178
- "The International HapMap Project," in Richard A. Gibbs, et al., eds., Nature, 426, December 2003, 789–796
- "Buried Alive: The Concept of Race in Science," in Alan H. Goodman, Deborah Heath, and M. Susan Lindee, eds., Genetic Nature / Culture: Anthropology and Science Beyond the Two-Culture Divide, Berkeley and London: University of California Press, 2003, 258–277
- "Social Side Effects of the New Human Molecular Genetic Diagnostics," in Michael Yudell and Robert DeSalle, eds., The Genomic Revolution: Unveiling the Unity of Life, Washington, DC: John Henry Press, 2002
- "Pattern, Purpose and Race in the Drug War: The Crisis of Credibility in Criminal Justice," in Craig Reinarman and Harry G. Levine, eds., Crack in America: Demon Drugs and Social Justice, Berkeley: University of California Press, 1997, 260–287.
- Duster, Troy (1971). The Legislation of Morality: Law, Drugs, and Moral Judgment. New York: Free Press. ISBN 978-0-02-908680-3.

== Awards ==
- Guggenheim Fellowship (1971)
