= Mary Henrietta Graham =

Early African American college attendee

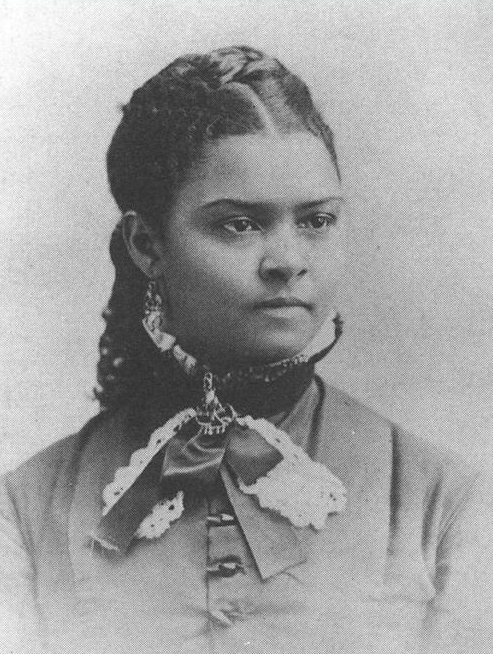
- Born: 1857 or 1858; Windsor, Ontario, Province of Canada
- Died: January 2, 1890 (aged 31–33); Chicago, Illinois, U.S.
- Education: University of Michigan
- Known for: Being the first female American descendant of slavery to be admitted to and the first biracial person to graduate from the University of Michigan
- Spouse: Ferdinand Lee Barnett (m. 1882)

Mary Henrietta Graham (1857 or 1858 – January 2, 1890) was the first African-American woman to be admitted to the University of Michigan, as well as the first biracial person to graduate from it.

== Early life ==
Graham was born in Windsor, Ontario, to a white Englishwoman mother (Sarah) and black father (Levi) from Illinois. She was the second oldest of at least four children. Her father was the co-owner of a grocery and her mother was a housekeeper. At some point in her youth, she moved to Flint, Michigan, where she graduated from Flint High School in 1876. She went by the nickname "Mollie."

== Education ==
She was accepted into the University of Michigan in September 1876, becoming its first ever black female student. Her academic focus was Latin and science, and she aimed to become a journalist. She graduated in 1880 with a Bachelor's of Philosophy in Literature. While in Ann Arbor, she lived at 10 Maynard Street and, later, 4 N. State St.

After graduating, she gained a post as a teacher at Lincoln University in Jefferson, Missouri.

== Later life ==
In 1882, she married the journalist, lawyer, and civil rights activist Ferdinand Lee Barnett. They lived in Chicago and worked on Barnett's newspaper The Chicago Conservator, the first black newspaper in the city. Mary and Ferdinand had two children, Ferdinand Lee (b. 1884) and Albert Graham Barnett.

Mary died in Chicago on January 2, 1890 of heart disease. An obituary in the files of the Bentley Historical Library reads:

At the time of her death, she was in the prime of useful vigorous life, the blow coming without a moment’s warning … During her short career of usefulness, she had come to be regarded not only as a woman of highest moral integrity, but of splendid ability and brilliant promise.

After Mary's death, her widower Ferdinand married Ida B. Wells in 1895.

== Legacy ==
In 2017, University of Michigan students suggested changing the name of the C. C. Little Building to honor Graham instead, putting a temporary sign with her name over the existing sign. In 2018, the name "C.C. Little" was dropped, and the building is currently referred to by its address, 1100 North University.
