= United States v. Balsys =

- Supreme Court of the United States

Argued April 20, 1998 Decided June 25, 1998
- Full case name: United States v. Balsys
- Citations: 524 U.S. 666 (more) 118 S. Ct. 2218
- Argument: Oral argument

Holding
- Concern with foreign prosecution is beyond the scope of the Self Incrimination Clause.

Court membership
- Chief Justice William Rehnquist Associate Justices John P. Stevens · Sandra Day O'Connor; Antonin Scalia · Anthony Kennedy; David Souter · Clarence Thomas; Ruth Bader Ginsburg · Stephen Breyer

Case opinions
- Majority: Souter, joined by Rehnquist, Stevens, O'Connor, Kennedy; Scalia and Thomas (Parts I, II, and III)
- Concurrence: Stevens
- Dissent: Ginsburg
- Dissent: Breyer, joined by Ginsburg

United States v. Balsys, 524 U.S. 666 (1998), is a United States Supreme Court case in which the court held that concern with foreign prosecution is beyond the scope of the Self Incrimination Clause. The case concerned Aloyzas Balsys, a Lithuanian who immigrated to the United States in 1961.

== Background ==
As a part of Balsys' application of immigration to the United States he stated prior service in the Lithuanian Army, serving from 1934 to 1940. He also stated that during World War II, he was hiding in Plateliai. His wartime activities between 1940 and 1944 came into question by the Justice Department's Office of Special Investigations (OSI) and become the center of the dispute over this case.

In 1979 the Justice Department's Office of Special Investigations (OSI) was established to investigate and deport supporters found of persecuting "any person because of race, religion, national origin, or political opinion." Fearing deportations at the deposition, Balsys invoked the Fifth Amendment right against self incrimination.

== Court rulings ==
The District court agreed that Balsys testimony could put him in danger with foreign countries but claimed that:

"The reasonableness of his fear is not challenged by the Government, and we thus squarely face the question whether a criminal prosecution by a foreign government not subject to our constitutional guarantees presents a “criminal case” for purposes of the privilege against self-incrimination."

Balsys appealed this decision to the Second Circuit but in a 7-to-2 decision the court held. With Justice Souter delivering the Courts Opinion stating fear of self incrimination and a following prosecution by a foreign country does not fall under the Fifth Amendment right against self incrimination.
