= Muscarello v. United States =

- Supreme Court of the United States

Argued March 23, 1998 Decided June 8, 1998
- Full case name: Frank J. Muscarello v. United States; Donald E. Cleveland and Enrique Gray-Santana v. United States
- Citations: 524 U.S. 125 (more) 118 S.Ct. 1911; 141 L. Ed. 2d 111; 1998 U.S. LEXIS 3879

Case history
- Prior: United States v. Muscarello, 106 F.3d 636 (5th Cir. 1997); cert. granted, 522 U.S. 1023 (1997); United States v. Cleveland, 106 F.3d 1056 (1st Cir. 1997); cert. granted, 522 U.S. 1023 (1997)

Holding
- The phrase "carries a firearm" in the mandatory sentencing provision of the firearms chapter of the Federal Criminal Code, 18 U.S.C. § 924(c)(1), will be broadly interpreted to encompass not only when a suspect is carrying a firearm on his person but also when the firearm is in either the trunk or locked glove compartment of the vehicle the suspect is driving.

Court membership
- Chief Justice William Rehnquist Associate Justices John P. Stevens · Sandra Day O'Connor; Antonin Scalia · Anthony Kennedy; David Souter · Clarence Thomas; Ruth Bader Ginsburg · Stephen Breyer

Case opinions
- Majority: Breyer, joined by Stevens, O'Connor, Kennedy, Thomas
- Dissent: Ginsburg, joined by Rehnquist, Scalia, Souter

Laws applied
- Firearms Penalties, 18 U.S.C. § 924(c)(1).

Muscarello v. United States, 524 U.S. 125 (1998), is a United States Supreme Court case focusing on legislative interpretation of a firearms chapter of the federal criminal code. The Court was asked to rule on whether a particular statute with the phrase “carries a firearm” should be interpreted so as to be limited to carrying a firearm only on one's person or interpreted more broadly to include carrying a firearm in a vehicle. The Court held that the statute should be construed broadly and that a firearm discovered in a vehicle, including the glove compartment and trunk, would constitute as “carrying” under the statute.

== Background ==
The federal criminal code has a provision dealing with firearms that imposes a five-year mandatory prison term on a person who “uses or carries a firearm” both during and in relation to a drug-related crime. Frank J. Muscarello, the petitioner, was arrested for selling marijuana; at the time of his arrest Muscarello had a handgun in the locked glove compartment of the truck in which he was transporting the marijuana. Muscarello's case was consolidated with another case with similar facts except in the other case the firearms in question were in the trunk of the car belonging to the other defendants’. Muscarello and the other defendants all argued that possessing firearms in a glove compartment or the trunk of a car fell outside of the scope of the mandatory sentencing statute.

== Opinion of the Court ==
In deciding whether possessing a firearm in either the glove compartment or the trunk should be included in the statutory definition of “carries” the Court employed a lengthy discussion of the linguistics and ordinary meanings of the phrase “carries a firearm.” The majority debated over the possible ways to define the phrase but ultimately ruled that the Congress intended for the word “carries” to be defined in its original, etymological meaning that would include conveying a gun in a vehicle and not necessarily on one's person. The Court did not make this ruling lightly and rested its reasoning on sources of literature, excerpts of New York Times articles, and multiple dictionaries to examine how the phrase has been used.

The Court then analyzed the purpose of Congress in enacting the legislation to further support the conclusion that Congress intended to include this type of “carrying” within the scope of the statute. To make this analysis the Court looked to the legislative history of the statute where they found that the congressional intent was to deter criminals to leave their guns at home instead of using them during the commission of a drug felony. Thus, on this point the Court also found that “carries a weapon” should be construed to include possessing a weapon in one's vehicle.
