= Forney v. Apfel =

- Supreme Court of the United States

Decided June 15, 1998
- Full case name: Forney v. Apfel
- Citations: 524 U.S. 266 (more)

Holding
- A Social Security disability claimant seeking court reversal of an agency decision denying benefits may appeal a district court order remanding the case to the agency for further proceedings.

Court membership
- Chief Justice William Rehnquist Associate Justices John P. Stevens · Sandra Day O'Connor; Antonin Scalia · Anthony Kennedy; David Souter · Clarence Thomas; Ruth Bader Ginsburg · Stephen Breyer

Case opinion
- Majority: Breyer, joined by unanimous

Forney v. Apfel, 524 U.S. 266 (1998), was a United States Supreme Court case in which the court held that a Social Security disability claimant seeking court reversal of an agency decision denying benefits may appeal a district court order remanding the case to the agency for further proceedings.

== Background ==
Forney sought judicial review of a Social Security Administration final determination denying her disability benefits. When the federal District Court found that determination inadequately supported by the evidence and remanded the case to the agency for further proceedings pursuant to sentence four of 42 U.S.C. § 405(g), Forney appealed, contending that the agency's denial of benefits should be reversed outright. The case was appealed to the Ninth Circuit Court of Appeals.

During oral arguments, the Ninth Circuit signaled to the parties that it doubted whether it had jurisdiction over the case. Despite arguing in its brief that the Ninth Circuit did not have jurisdiction, the government suddenly switched its position and argued that it did. The Ninth Circuit held that Forney did not have the legal right to appeal. The Supreme Court granted certiorari.

Because the parties agreed at the time of the appeal, the Supreme Court appointed an amicus to defend the Ninth Circuit's decision. The amicus was Allen R. Snyder, a former clerk of John Marshall Harlan II and William Rehnquist. However, in the government's briefing for the Supreme Court, the Solicitor General noted that this momentary change in position had been changed back.

== Opinion of the court ==
The Supreme Court issued an opinion on June 15, 1998.
