= White-Washing Race =

2005 book about racial discrimination

White-Washing Race The Myth of a Color-blind Society
- First edition
- Author: Michael K. Brown, Martin Carnoy, Elliott Currie, Troy Duster, David Benjamin Oppenheimer, Majorie M. Shultz, and David Wellman
- Language: English
- Subject: Social Science: Racism & Racial Relations
- Publisher: The University of California Press
- Publication date: 2005
- Publication place: United States
- Media type: Print (hardback & paperback)
- Pages: 349
- ISBN: 0-520-24475-3
- OCLC: 58830265

White-Washing Race: The Myth of a Color-Blind Society is a 2005 book arguing that racial discrimination is still evident on contemporary American society. The book draws on the fields of sociology, political science, economics, criminology, and legal studies. The authors argue against the idea that the inequalities which prevail in America today, especially with regard to wages, income, and access to housing and health care, are the effects of either cultural or individual failures.

The book provides an alternative explanation: that racism—particularly institutionalized racism—is as much a problem in America as in earlier times. Such inequalities continue to exist in the labor market, the welfare state, the criminal justice system, and schools and universities. The book recounts the history of advancement among black Americans since the 1960s, and current anti-discrimination policies, but advocates new policies for increased racial equality in a post-affirmative action world.

== Authors ==
Michael K. Brown and David Wellman are currently professors at UC Santa Cruz. Marjorie M. Schultz and Troy Duster are Professors at UC Berkeley, while Elliott Currie is a Professor in the Department of Criminology, Law and Society at UC Irvine. Troy Duster is also a professor at New York University. David Benjamin Oppenheimer is a Clinical Professor of Law at UC Berkeley School of Law and the Director of UC Berkeley's Center on Comparative Equality and Anti-Discrimination Law. Martin Carnoy is currently employed at Stanford University as a Professor of Education and Economics.

== Awards ==
- Gustavus Myers Outstanding Book Award: Gustavus Myers Awards
- Benjamin L. Hooks Outstanding Book Award: Benjamin L. Hooks Institute for Social Change
- C. Wright Mills Award Finalist: Society for the Study of Social Problems

== See also ==
- Racism in the United States
- Poverty in the United States
- Color blindness (race)
- Constitutional colorblindness

== Related books ==
- Unequal Childhoods: Class, Race, and Family Life by Annette Lareau,
- Working-Class Heroes: Protecting Home, Community, and Nation in a Chicago Neighborhood by Maria Kefalas,
- Maghbouleh, N. (2017). The Limits of Whiteness: Iranian Americans and the Everyday Politics of Race. United States: Stanford University Press. ISBN 9781503603370
- Colored White: Transcending the Racial Past by David R. Roediger
- Zia-Ebrahimi, Reza (2016). The Emergence of Iranian Nationalism: Race and the Politics of Dislocation. Columbia University Press. ISBN 978-0231175760. (Note: Explains the attempt of Iranian immigrants trying to re-define themselves and origins as white Europeans)
