= Hopkins v. Reeves =

- Supreme Court of the United States

Decided June 8, 1998
- Full case name: Frank X. Hopkins, Warden, v. Randolph K. Reeves
- Citations: 524 U.S. 88 (more)

Holding
- In death-penalty cases, the constitution does not require juries to be informed of a lesser-included offense that may suit the facts without being death-eligible when the proposed alternative is not a lesser-included offense under state law.

Court membership
- Chief Justice William Rehnquist Associate Justices John P. Stevens · Sandra Day O'Connor; Antonin Scalia · Anthony Kennedy; David Souter · Clarence Thomas; Ruth Bader Ginsburg · Stephen Breyer

Case opinions
- Majority: Thomas
- Dissent: Stevens

Hopkins v. Reeves, 524 U.S. 88 (1998), was a United States Supreme Court case in which the court held that, in death-penalty cases, the constitution does not require juries to be informed of a lesser-included offense that may suit the facts without being death-eligible when the proposed alternative is not a lesser-included offense under state law. In this case, the proposed alternative was manslaughter; however, manslaughter is not a lesser-included offense of felony murder under Nebraska law.

== Background ==
Randolph K. Reeves was indicted on two counts of felony murder under Nebraska law. The Nebraska first-degree murder statute defines felony murder as murder committed in the perpetration of certain enumerated felonies, including, as relevant here, sexual assault and attempt to commit sexual assault in the first degree. Under Nebraska law, intent to kill is conclusively presumed if the State proves intent to commit the underlying felony. A felony-murder conviction makes a defendant eligible for the death penalty, which in Nebraska is imposed judicially, not by the trial jury.

The trial court refused Reeves's request to instruct the jury on second-degree murder and manslaughter on the ground that the Nebraska Supreme Court consistently has held that these crimes are not lesser included offenses of felony murder. Reeves's jury then convicted him on both felony-murder counts, and a three-judge panel sentenced him to death. After exhausting his state remedies, respondent filed a federal habeas corpus petition, claiming, among other things, that the trial court's failure to give the requested instructions was unconstitutional under Beck v. Alabama, in which the Supreme Court invalidated an Alabama law that prohibited lesser-included offense instructions in capital cases when lesser included offenses to the charged crime existed under state law and such instructions were generally given in non-capital cases. Beck was intended to prevent the trial from becoming an all-or-noting decision about whether to execute the defendant rather than an evaluation of the elements of the alleged crime.

The federal District Court granted relief on an unrelated due process claim, which the Eighth Circuit Court of Appeals rejected. However, the Eighth Circuit also held that, in failing to give the requested instructions, the trial court had committed the same constitutional error as that in Beck.

The Supreme Court granted certiorari.

== Opinion of the court ==
The Supreme Court issued an opinion on June 8, 1998. In an opinion by Justice Clarence Thomas, the court held that the instructions could not be required because allowing the court to instruct the jury about alternate charges that were not lesser-included offenses under state law would be "unworkable" because "there would be no basis for determining the offenses for which instructions are warranted."

== Later developments ==
Reeves died while incarcerated in 2016. The victim's family forgave him and advocated against his execution.
