= Burlington Industries, Inc. v. Ellerth =

- Supreme Court of the United States

Argued April 22, 1998 Decided June 26, 1998
- Full case name: Burlington Industries, Inc. v. Ellerth
- Citations: 524 U.S. 742 (more) 118 S. Ct. 2257; 141 L. Ed. 2d 633
- Argument: Oral argument

Case history
- Prior: Summary judgment granted, Ellerth v. Burlington Industries, Inc., 912 F. Supp. 1101 (N.D. Ill. 1996); reversed sub. nom., Jansen v. Packaging Corp. of Am., 123 F.3d 490 (7th Cir. 1996); cert. granted, 522 U.S. 1086 (1998).
- Subsequent: On remand, Ellerth v. Burlington Indus., Inc., 165 F.3d 31 (7th Cir. 1998).

Holding
- An employer is subject to vicarious liability to a victimized employee for an actionable hostile environment created by a supervisor with immediate (or higher) authority over the employee, subject to an affirmative defense when no tangible employment action is taken.

Court membership
- Chief Justice William Rehnquist Associate Justices John P. Stevens · Sandra Day O'Connor; Antonin Scalia · Anthony Kennedy; David Souter · Clarence Thomas; Ruth Bader Ginsburg · Stephen Breyer

Case opinions
- Majority: Kennedy, joined by Rehnquist, Stevens, O'Connor, Souter, Breyer
- Concurrence: Ginsburg
- Dissent: Thomas, joined by Scalia

Laws applied
- Title VII of the Civil Rights Act of 1964

Burlington Industries, Inc. v. Ellerth, 524 U.S. 742 (1998), is a landmark employment law case of the United States Supreme Court holding that employers are liable if supervisors create a hostile work environment for employees. Ellerth also introduced a two-part affirmative defense allowing employers to avoid sex discrimination liability if they follow best practices. Ellerth is often considered alongside Faragher.

== Facts ==
Kimberly Ellerth, a female employee at Burlington Industries, sued the company for sexual harassment on the part of her male supervisor. She alleged the vice president of sales made offensive remarks and unwanted overtures. She identified three episodes involving threats to deny tangible job benefits unless sexual favors were granted. She alleged a violation of title VII of the Civil Rights Act of 1964. The lower court dismissed her claim, noting that she had suffered no actual negative job consequences. The Seventh Circuit Court of Appeals reversed the lower court decision, but issued 8 separate opinions.

David Benjamin Oppenheimer served as counsel for amicus curiae National Employment Lawyers Association in the U.S. Supreme Court.

== Burlington Industries defense ==
Ellerth is most referenced for its two-part affirmative defense for supervisor sexual harassment. In the case, a supervisor is defined by the ability to take a Tangible Employment Action. A Tangible Employment Action makes the company vicariously liable because the agency relationship was used to take the action. In alleged sex discrimination cases without a Tangible Employment Action, employers may prove that:

1. the employer exercised reasonable care to prevent and correct promptly any sexually harassing behavior, and that
2. the employee unreasonably failed to take advantage of any preventative or corrective opportunities provided by the employer or to avoid harm otherwise.

Generally, having an effective sexual harassment policy that is used and works is sufficient to satisfy the first prong. Further cases (see EEOC v. Racine) examine whether an employee's failure to take advantage of the policy was unreasonable, but Ellerth holds that when the policy requires reporting to a harasser, it is not unreasonable to fail to do so. (Ellerth would have been required to report to her harasser.)

== Judgment ==
In a 7–2 decision, the Supreme Court ruled in her favor. Justice Anthony Kennedy said that Congress had left it to the courts to determine the controlling principles. This majority ruling was summarized as follows:

Under Title VII, an employee who refuses the unwelcome and threatening sexual advances of a supervisor, yet suffers no adverse, tangible job consequences, may recover against the employer without showing the employer is negligent or otherwise at fault for the supervisor's actions, but the employer may interpose an affirmative defense.

Justice Kennedy wrote the majority opinion, joined by Chief Justice Rehnquist, Justice Stevens, Justice O'Connor, Justice Souter, and Justice Breyer. Justice Ginsburg wrote a concurring opinion.

Justice Thomas wrote a dissenting opinion, joined by Justice Scalia.
