= The Legislation of Morality =

1970 book by Troy Duster

The Legislation of Morality: Law, Drugs, and Moral Judgment
- Author: Troy Duster
- Language: English
- Publisher: Free Press
- Publication date: 1970
- Publication place: United States
- Pages: 274
- ISBN: 9780029086704

The Legislation of Morality is a 1970 book by sociologist Troy Duster that explored the relationship of law and morality in the context of drug policy in the United States. It is noted for its historical analysis of the effects of the Harrison Narcotics Tax Act (1914) and study of the sociology of deviance.

The American Sociological Association has called the book "a classic". Its main thesis is that drug use was criminalized because society began to see drug users as mostly non-white and poor. The "groundbreaking book" argued that the moral panic about drug use was based on this public perception.

== Synopsis ==
The Legislation of Morality begins with a detailed historical study of opiate use in the 19th-century United States. There were no restrictions and no labelling requirements for the syrups and concoctions that white women purchased directly from pharmacies. Sometimes opium was added to cough syrups and tonics without the customer's knowledge. Addiction was managed quietly, in secret, and caused little social disturbance as long as the tonics and syrups were easily purchased from legal sources.

Almost overnight the Harrison Narcotics Tax Act (1914) made thousands of already addicted people dependant on physicians to prescribe the drug for them. By 1920 medical journals were claiming that a majority of drug addicts were from the "unrespectable" parts of society.

Duster said the policy of drug criminalization was founded on "errors about the total quality of persons addicted". He concluded it was easier for middle America to direct its moral hostility "toward a young, lower-class Negro male than toward a middle-aged white female".

== Reviews and scholarship ==
Harold Finestone commented on Duster's conclusion that society's moral contempt for drug users was primarily driven by public perception about their social and economic class: "an important assumption of the author's position that middle-class people do not tend to stigmatize behavior common in their own class".

Sociologists Jennifer Friedman and Marisa Alicea note that Duster's masculinized image of the "willful, hedonistic, and deceitful" addict has become dominant in the public consciousness. They speculate that younger generations of women engaging in the now de-feminized act of opiate use may view it as an act of empowerment or rebellion against traditional images of femininity.

Charles E. Reasons said that The Legislation of Morality presented "myths concerning the nature and effects of drugs" without systematic investigation of the "images of drugs and users in the mass media". Janet Henkin said Duster's "analysis of the consequences of this typification and of the permanence of the stigma upon the addicts self-image seems to lack impact".

When The Legislation of Morality was written there were no outpatient clinics for medication management of opiate addiction. Peter Park reviewing the book says the author "persuasively" argues for treatment on an outpatient basis. Park said the book's discussion of "how deviants are created and managed in and by society" was "confusing and disappointing".

Robert H. Vasoli was critical:

It is one thing for the sociologist to analyze morality empirically and quite another to advocate this set of morals over another. Admittedly the analysis might suggest the wisdom or folly of a certain moral position, but in many instances it loses its credibility and becomes a species of empirical muckraking when the scientist making the analysis openly espouses the continuation or abolition of the moral norm in question.

William Garmon says the book "raises more questions than it answers", noting the book's critical view of the limited treatment options available at the time it was published.

== Sources ==
- Brownstein, Henry H. (2017). "Sociological Perspectives on Illicit Involvement with Drugs". In Korgen, Kathleen Odell (ed.). The Cambridge Handbook of Sociology. Cambridge University Press.
- Duster, Troy (1970). The Legislation of Morality: Law, Drugs, and Moral Judgment. New York: Free Press. ISBN 978-0-02-908680-3.
- Garmon, William S. (1971). "Reviewed Work(s): The Legislation of Morality, Drugs, and Moral Judgment by Troy Duster". Review of Religious Research. 12 (1).
- Finestone, Harold (1972). "Review". The Annals of the American Academy of Political and Social Science. 400.
- Friedman, Jennifer; Alicea, Marisa (1995). "Women and Heroin: The Path of Resistance and Its Consequences". Gender and Society. 9 (4).
- Hagan, John (1980). "The Legislation of Crime and Delinquency: A Review of Theory Method and Research". Law & Society Review. 14 (3).
- Henkin, Janet (1971). "Book Reviews". Journal of Criminal Law and Criminology. 62 (2): 263.
- Hicks, Joe H. (1973). "Review". Journal of Church and State. 15 (2).
- Midanik, Lorraine T. (2003). "Review of Drug War Heresies: Learning from Other Vices, Times & Places". The Journal of Sociology & Social Welfare. 30 (2).
- Park, Peter (1971). "Review". American Journal of Sociology. 76 (4).
- Reasons, Charles E. (1976). "Images of Crime and the Criminal: The Dope Fiend Mythology". Journal of Research in Crime and Delinquency. 13 (2).
- Vasoli, Robert H. (1971). "Reviewed Work(s): The Legislation of Morality, Drugs, and Moral Judgment by Troy Duster". American Sociological Review. 36 (4).
