= Monge v. California =

- Supreme Court of the United States

Argued April 28, 1998 Decided June 26, 1998
- Full case name: Monge v. California
- Citations: 524 U.S. 721 (more)

Case history
- Prior: People v. Monge, 941 P.2d 1121 (Cal. 1997)

Holding
- The Double Jeopardy Clause does not preclude retrial on a prior conviction allegation in noncapital sentencing proceedings.

Court membership
- Chief Justice William Rehnquist Associate Justices John P. Stevens · Sandra Day O'Connor; Antonin Scalia · Anthony Kennedy; David Souter · Clarence Thomas; Ruth Bader Ginsburg · Stephen Breyer

Case opinions
- Majority: O'Connor, joined by Rehnquist, Kennedy, Thomas, Breyer
- Dissent: Stevens
- Dissent: Scalia, joined by Souter, Ginsburg

Monge v. California, 524 U.S. 721 (1998), was a United States Supreme Court case in which the court held that the Double Jeopardy Clause does not preclude retrial on a prior conviction allegation in noncapital sentencing proceedings.

== Background ==
California's three-strikes law provides, among other things, that a convicted felon with one prior conviction for a serious felony—such as assault where the felon inflicted great bodily injury or personally used a dangerous or deadly weapon—will have his prison term doubled. Under California law, a number of procedural safeguards surround the assessment of prior conviction allegations: Defendants may invoke the right to a jury trial, the right to confront witnesses, and the privilege against self-incrimination; the prosecution must prove the allegations beyond a reasonable doubt; and the rules of evidence apply.

After Monge was convicted on three counts of violating California drug laws, the State sought to have his sentence enhanced based on a previous assault conviction and the resulting prison term. At the sentencing hearing, the prosecutor asserted that petitioner had personally used a stick during the assault but introduced into evidence only a prison record showing that he had been convicted of assault with a deadly weapon and had served a prison term for the offense. Finding both sentencing allegations true, the trial court doubled Monge's sentence on count one and added a 1-year enhancement for the prior prison term.

On appeal, the California Court of Appeal ruled that the evidence was insufficient to trigger the sentence enhancement because the prior conviction allegations were not proved beyond a reasonable doubt, and that a remand for retrial on the sentence enhancement would violate double jeopardy principles. The California Supreme Court reversed the double jeopardy ruling. A plurality held that the Double Jeopardy Clause, though applicable in the capital sentencing context per Bullington v. Missouri, does not extend to non-capital sentencing proceedings.

== Opinion of the court ==
The Supreme Court issued an opinion on June 26, 1998.
