= Killing of Anastasio Hernández-Rojas =

2010 killing by US border patrol officers

- Date: May 28, 2010
- Outcome: U.S. settled a million-dollar lawsuit with Hernández-Rojas' estate. None of the agents were disciplined or fired.

Anastasio Hernández-Rojas was killed by United States Customs and Border Protection officers on May 28, 2010. He was handcuffed and beaten and tased multiple times until he died from a heart attack. The controversial death of Hernández-Rojas occurred after a US border deportation dispute involving federal agent use of taser(s), and alleged excessive force has caused a demand by the Mexican government for a thorough investigation. A national newspaper in Mexico, El Universal, claimed that up to 20 US federal border agents beat Mr. Hernández Rojas in the presence of various witnesses while he pleaded for mercy.

According to a report by the American Civil Liberties Union (ACLU), the San Diego coroner's office recorded in addition to a heart attack: “several loose teeth; bruising to his chest, stomach, hips, knees, back, lips, head, and eyelids; five broken ribs; and a damaged spine”, and classified Anastasio's death as a homicide. A U.S. Justice Department announcement on November 6, 2015, of decision to clear the federal agents involved in the death sparked a protest demonstration involving several hundred people.

Anastacio Hernández came to the United States when he was 15, lived there until he was 42 years old as an undocumented immigrant. He had five children with his common-law wife, María Puga. He was deported to Mexico following an arrest in May 2010 by the San Diego Police, for attempting to "shoplift steak and tequila from a grocery store." During a failed attempt to reunite with his family in San Diego later in the same year, Hernández was caught by border agents at the San Ysidro Port of Entry. According to an investigation by the U.S. Justice Department, not independently verified, during the apprehension, Hernández-Rojas began grappling with the two U.S. Border Patrol agents who apprehended him once they removed his handcuffs; Hernández-Rojas then resisted their attempts to restrain him. Two Immigrants and Customs Enforcement Agents, as well as another U.S. Border Patrol Agent joined the resultant struggle and struck Hernández-Rojas several times with their batons. Once re-secured in handcuffs, Hernández-Rojas continued to struggle and kick at the arresting agents--again this is the government's view only.

Once a transport vehicle arrived to take Hernández-Rojas back to the station, since he was then under arrest, being no longer eligible for voluntary re-entry to the United States due to his resistance towards apprehending agents, Hernández-Rojas again physically resisted the agents and kicked at them as they attempted to place him into the transport vehicle; more Customs and Border Protection officers responded to the scene, one of whom shocked Hernández-Rojas with a taser. During transport, Hernández-Rojas' breathing slowed, and he became unresponsive. The officers administered CPR until medical personnel arrived at the scene. Hernandez-Rojas was pronounced dead two days later after being removed from life support. Witnesses filmed agents who handcuffed Hernández, broke five of his ribs, and damaged his spine. One of the bystanders, Ashley Young, hid the video card in her pocket when the border police approached the crowd demanding the recordings. Seven years after the incident, the agents had not been disciplined or fired. In February 2017, the United States settled a million-dollar lawsuit with Puga and her children, who were represented by attorney Eugene Iredale. Also, notably, David Benjamin Oppenheimer filed an amicus curiae brief to the Inter-American Commission on Human Rights regarding the case.

In 2013 Nonny de la Peña, a pioneer in virtual reality, whose work is described as immersive journalism, created a five-minute-long VR called Use of Force, in which she recreated Hernández's death. In the VR project, which was funded by Tribeca Film Institute, Google, and the Associated Press, viewers witness the event from the viewpoint of bystanders, many of whom had captured the beating on video.

On 1 May 2025, the Inter-American Commission on Human Rights released a report which found the United States responsible for the killing, torture, and deprivation of liberty of Hernandez-Rojas, violating articles I, XI, XVII and XXV of the American Declaration of the Rights and Duties of Man.

HBO released an original documentary on the Border Patrol killing, Critical Incident: Death at the Border, on Dec. 29, 2025.
