= List of United States Supreme Court cases, volume 524 =

This is a list of all United States Supreme Court cases from volume 524 of the United States Reports:

Case name	Citation	Date decided
United States v. Cabrales	524 U.S. 1	1998
Federal Election Comm'n v. Akins	524 U.S. 11	1998
United States v. Beggerly	524 U.S. 38	June 1, 1998
United States v. Bestfoods	524 U.S. 51	1998
Geissal v. Moore Medical Corp.	524 U.S. 74	1998
Hopkins v. Reeves	524 U.S. 88	1998
Cass County v. Leech Lake Band of Chippewa Indians	524 U.S. 103	1998
Dooley v. Korean Air Lines Co.	524 U.S. 116	1998
Muscarello v. United States	524 U.S. 125	1998
New Mexico ex rel. Ortiz v. Reed	524 U.S. 151	1998
Phillips v. Washington Legal Foundation	524 U.S. 156	1998
Interest earned on client funds held in IOLTA accounts is the "private property" of the client for Takings Clause purposes.
Bryan v. United States	524 U.S. 184	1998
Pennsylvania Dept. of Corrections v. Yeskey	524 U.S. 206	1998
American Telephone & Telegraph Co. v. Central Office Telephone, Inc.	524 U.S. 214	1998
Hohn v. United States	524 U.S. 236	1998
Forney v. Apfel	524 U.S. 266	1998
A Social Security disability claimant seeking court reversal of an agency decision denying benefits may appeal a district court order remanding the case to the agency for further proceedings.
Gebser v. Lago Vista Independent School Dist.	524 U.S. 274	1998
Caron v. United States	524 U.S. 308	1998
United States v. Bajakajian	524 U.S. 321	1998
Pennsylvania Bd. of Probation and Parole v. Scott	524 U.S. 357	1998
Wisconsin Dept. of Corrections v. Schacht	524 U.S. 381	1998
The presence in an otherwise removable case of a claim barred by the Eleventh Amendment does not destroy removal jurisdiction that would otherwise exist.
Swidler & Berlin v. United States	524 U.S. 399	1998
Clinton v. City of New York	524 U.S. 417	1998
Eastern Enterprises v. Apfel	524 U.S. 498	1998
National Endowment for the Arts v. Finley	524 U.S. 569	1998
Bragdon v. Abbott	524 U.S. 624	1998
United States v. Balsys	524 U.S. 666	1998
Monge v. California	524 U.S. 721	1998
Burlington Industries, Inc. v. Ellerth	524 U.S. 742	1998
Faragher v. Boca Raton	524 U.S. 775	1998
