= United States v. Bestfoods =

- Supreme Court of the United States

Argued March 24, 1998 Decided June 8, 1998
- Full case name: United States v. Bestfoods, et al.
- Citations: 524 U.S. 51 (more) 118 S. Ct. 1876; 141 L. Ed. 2d 43; 1998 U.S. LEXIS 3733

Case history
- Prior: Reversed in part, 113 F.3d 572 (6th Cir. 1997). Certiorari granted.

Holding
- The liability of a parent corporation under CERCLA is to be determined by its control over a subsidiary's facility.

Court membership
- Chief Justice William Rehnquist Associate Justices John P. Stevens · Sandra Day O'Connor; Antonin Scalia · Anthony Kennedy; David Souter · Clarence Thomas; Ruth Bader Ginsburg · Stephen Breyer

Case opinion
- Majority: Souter, joined by unanimous

Laws applied
- CERCLA

United States v. Bestfoods, 524 U.S. 51 (1998), is a United States corporate law and environmental law case in which the Supreme Court of the United States held that the indirect liability of a parent corporation under CERCLA is to be determined by its control over a subsidiary's facility, rather than the relationship between the corporation and subsidiary.

== Facts ==
A chemical manufacturing plant developed a significant pollution problem after many years of operation. The companies in charge of operations at the plant were wholly owned subsidiaries of, first, CPC International Inc. (CPC). Following ownership by CPC, the chemical manufacturing plant was owned by Aerojet- General Corp (Aerojet). In 1981, the Environmental Protection Agency ordered to have the site cleaned up. To reimburse the cleanup, the federal government filed suit under Section 107 of the Comprehensive Environmental Response, Compensation, and Liability Act of 1980 (CERCLA), 42 U.S.C. Section 9607(a)(2). Section 107 grants the federal government permission to seek reimbursement for cleanup costs from "any person who at the time of disposal of any hazardous substance owned or operated any facility."

The question before the court, was whether a parent corporation that exercised control over the operations of a subsidiary be held liable under CERCLA Section 107(a)(2)?

== Decision of the Court ==
Justice Souter delivered the unanimous decision in favor of the United States. The Court found the CERCLA statute definition of "owner or operator" as "any person owning or operating such facility" to be a circular definition in need of clarity. To determine whether Congress intended to include parent corporations when imposing liability on an owner or operator, the Court examined the legislative history of CERCLA, but due to the Act's hurried enactment, there was not much history to interpret. The Court concluded that Congress did not intend CERCLA to displace all of the established principles of corporate law, including the principle that a parent corporation is not usually liable for the acts of its subsidiary, but a corporate parent that actively participated in and exercised control over the operations of the facility may be held directly liable in its own right as an 'operator' of the facility. The Court held that the corporate law principles read into the statute meant that liability will be attached under CERCLA for a parent corporation when the corporate veil can be pierced and when the parent actually participated in the operations of the facility where the release of hazardous substances was made.

== See also ==
- United States corporate law
- Unilever, which acquired the Bestfoods Corporation in 2000
- List of United States Supreme Court cases, volume 524
