= FEC v. Akins =

Federal Election Commission v. Akins
- Supreme Court of the United States

Argued January 14, 1998 Decided June 1, 1998
- Full case name: Federal Election Commission v. James E. Akins, Richard Curtiss, Paul Findley, Robert J. Hanks, Andrew Killgore, and Orin Parker
- Citations: 524 U.S. 11 (more) 118 S. Ct. 1777; 141 L. Ed. 2d 10; 1998 U.S. LEXIS 3567; 66 U.S.L.W. 4426; 98 Cal. Daily Op. Service 4092; 98 Daily Journal DAR 5637; 98 Colo. J. C.A.R. 2743; 11 Fla. L. Weekly Fed. S 581

Case history
- Prior: 66 F.3d 348 (D.C. Cir. 1995); vacated, 74 F.3d 287 (D.C. Cir. 1996); reversed on rehearing en banc, 101 F.3d 731 (D.C. Cir. 1996); cert. granted, 520 U.S. 1273 (1997).

Holding
- The Court held that an individual could sue for a violation of a federal law pursuant to a statute enacted by the U.S. Congress which created a general right to access certain information.

Court membership
- Chief Justice William Rehnquist Associate Justices John P. Stevens · Sandra Day O'Connor; Antonin Scalia · Anthony Kennedy; David Souter · Clarence Thomas; Ruth Bader Ginsburg · Stephen Breyer

Case opinions
- Majority: Breyer, joined by Rehnquist, Stevens, Kennedy, Souter, Ginsburg
- Dissent: Scalia, joined by O'Connor, Thomas

Laws applied
- U.S. Const. Art. III

Federal Election Commission v. Akins, 524 U.S. 11 (1998), was a United States Supreme Court case deciding that an individual could sue for a violation of a federal law pursuant to a statute enacted by the U.S. Congress which created a general right to access certain information.

== Facts ==
The plaintiffs were registered voters who had asked the defendant Federal Election Commission ("FEC") to determine that an organization called the American Israel Public Affairs Committee ("AIPAC") was a "political committee" subject to certain regulations and reporting requirements under the Federal Election Campaign Act, because AIPAC had crossed certain spending thresholds. The FEC determined that AIPAC had indeed crossed those thresholds, but still did not require it to make the required reports because the organization was issue-oriented, not campaign-related. The plaintiffs sought review in the District Court, which granted summary judgment for the FEC; this ruling was affirmed by a panel of the Court of Appeals, but the Court of Appeals en banc reversed. The government sought certiorari, and challenged the plaintiff's standing on the grounds that the plaintiffs had suffered no 'injury in fact'; that if the plaintiffs had any injury it was not fairly traceable to the FEC decision; and that a decision in favor of the plaintiffs would not redress their injury.

== Issue ==
Did the plaintiffs suffer an injury in fact sufficient to establish standing?

== Opinion of the Court ==
The Court, in an opinion by Justice Breyer, held that Congress has, by statute, allowed "any party aggrieved by an order of the Commission" to file a suit, which is a broad grant; not getting the requested information is an "injury in fact" just like the denial of any other information which is statutorily required to be provided to citizens by the government. The grievance is a "generalized grievance," but the harm is concrete enough to overcome this, and the harm is fairly traceable to the FEC – even though the FEC may find other grounds not to make AIPAC provide the info.

The Court distinguished this case from lawsuits where an individual seeks relief based on mere taxpayer standing – an insufficient ground for standing to sue. It instead employed a "zone of interests test," asking whether the injury asserted fell into the zone of interests protected by the statute.

The case was remanded to the FEC to review its definition of 'members.' The Court noted that the FEC was producing new guidelines regarding this issue, which would address it and not require a new legal precedent. The plaintiffs were bitterly disappointed by the decision not to intervene, as the effort to have AIPAC legally declared a political action committee was a higher priority than the (successful) effort to show standing to have filed this lawsuit in the first place. While they repeatedly attempted filings to have the case re-opened, these were entirely rejected, and in 2010 a Federal court in D.C. ruled that the lawsuit had no merit as electoral law and it was officially and finally dismissed.

== Dissent ==
Justice Scalia wrote a dissenting opinion asserting that the fact the statute differentiated between 'any person' (in defining the class of persons who could file a complaint with the FEC over a violation) and 'any party aggrieved' (in defining the class of persons who could bring suit in federal court over the FEC's decision on the complaint) demonstrated the limiting force of the latter provision—anyone could file a complaint with the FEC if they believed a violation had occurred, but only parties who had actually been aggrieved (suffered a particularized injury) as a result of the FEC's decision on the complaint could sue.
