= Phillips v. Washington Legal Foundation =

- Supreme Court of the United States

Decided June 15, 1998
- Full case name: Phillips v. Washington Legal Foundation
- Citations: 524 U.S. 156 (more)

Holding
- Interest earned on client funds held in IOLTA accounts is the "private property" of the client for Takings Clause purposes.

Court membership
- Chief Justice William Rehnquist Associate Justices John P. Stevens · Sandra Day O'Connor; Antonin Scalia · Anthony Kennedy; David Souter · Clarence Thomas; Ruth Bader Ginsburg · Stephen Breyer

Case opinions
- Majority: Rehnquist, joined by O'CONNOR, SCALIA, KENNEDY, THOMAS
- Dissent: SOUTER, joined by STEVENS, GINSBURG, BREYER
- Dissent: BREYER, joined by STEVENS, SOUTER, GINSBURG

Laws applied
- Takings Clause

Phillips v. Washington Legal Foundation, 524 U.S. 156 (1998), was a United States Supreme Court case in which the court held that interest earned on client funds held in IOLTA accounts is the "private property" of the client for Takings Clause purposes.

== Background ==
Under Texas's Interest on Lawyers Trust Account (IOLTA) program, an attorney who receives client funds must place them in a separate, interest-bearing, federally authorized "NOW" account upon determining that the funds "could not reasonably be expected to earn interest for the client or [that] the interest which might be earned... is not likely to be sufficient to offset the cost of establishing and maintaining the account, service charges, accounting costs and tax reporting costs which would be incurred in attempting to obtain the interest." IOLTA interest income is paid to the Texas Equal Access to Justice Foundation (TEAJF), which finances legal services for low-income people. The Internal Revenue Service does not attribute such interest to the individual clients for federal income tax purposes if they have no control over the decision whether to place the funds in the IOLTA account and do not designate who will receive the interest.

A group of plaintiffs—a public-interest organization with Texas members opposed to the IOLTA program, a Texas attorney who regularly deposited client funds in an IOLTA account, and a Texas businessman whose attorney retainer had been so deposited (collectively, Washington Legal Foundation)—filed this suit against TEAJF and the other defendants (collectively, Phillips). Their complaint alleged, among other things, that the Texas IOLTA program violated their rights under the Fifth Amendment, which provides that "private property" shall not "be taken for public use, without just compensation." The federal District Court granted Phillips summary judgment, reasoning that respondents had no property interest in the IOLTA interest proceeds. The Fifth Circuit Court of Appeals reversed, concluding that such interest belongs to the owner of the principal.

The Supreme Court granted certiorari.

== Opinion of the court ==
The Supreme Court issued an opinion on June 15, 1998.
