= Red Duster =

Red Duster may refer to:

- Red Duster (ensign), slang term for the Red Ensign
- Red Duster (missile), code for the Bristol Bloodhound surface-to-air missile
