= Quid pro quo =

Latin phrase meaning 'something for something'

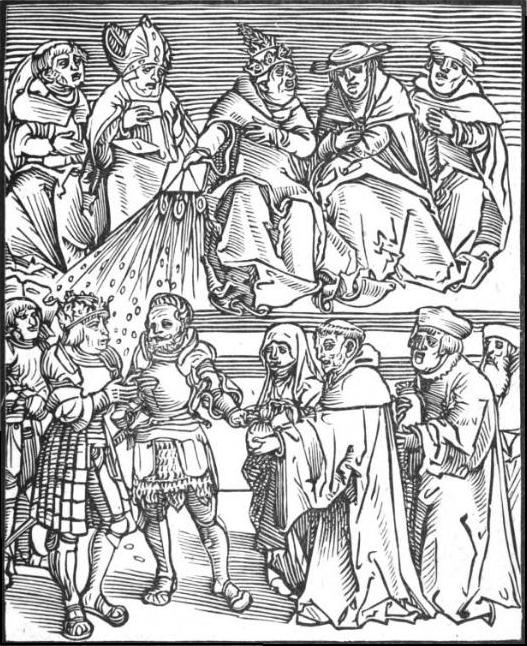
Antichristus, a woodcut by Lucas Cranach the Elder of the pope using the temporal power to grant authority to a ruler contributing generously to the Catholic Church

Quid pro quo (Renaissance Latin: 'something for something') is a Latin phrase used in English to mean an exchange of goods or services, in which one transfer is contingent upon the other; "a favor for a favor". In American English it is a euphemism for financial crime. Phrases with similar meanings include: "give and take", "tit for tat", "you scratch my back, and I'll scratch yours", "this for that," and "one hand washes the other". Other languages use do ut des to express a reciprocal exchange, which aligns with the Latin meaning, whereas the widespread use of quid pro quo in English for this concept actually means "misunderstanding" in Latin, or “mistaking something for something else”.

== Origins ==
The Latin phrase quid pro quo originally implied that something had been substituted, meaning "something for something" as in I gave you sugar for salt. Early usage by English speakers followed the original Latin meaning, with occurrences in the 1530s where the term referred to substituting one medicine for another, whether unintentionally or fraudulently. By the end of the same century, quid pro quo evolved into a more current use to describe equivalent exchanges.

In 1654, the expression quid pro quo was used to generally refer to something done for personal gain or with the expectation of reciprocity in the text The Reign of King Charles: An History Disposed into Annalls, with a somewhat positive connotation. It refers to the covenant with Christ as something "that prove not a nudum pactum, a naked contract, without quid pro quo." Believers in Christ have to do their part in return, namely "foresake the devil and all his works".

Quid pro quo would go on to be used, by English speakers in legal and diplomatic contexts, as an exchange of equally valued goods or services and continues to be today.

The Latin phrase corresponding to the English usage of quid pro quo is do ut des (Latin for "I give, so that you may give"). Other languages continue to use do ut des for this purpose, while quid pro quo (or its equivalent qui pro quo, as widely used in Italian, French, Spanish and Portuguese) still keeps its original meaning of something being unwittingly mistaken, or erroneously told or understood, instead of something else.

== Legal meanings ==
=== Common law ===
In common law, quid pro quo indicates that an item or a service has been traded in return for something of value, usually when the propriety or equity of the transaction is in question. A contract must involve consideration: that is, the exchange of something of value for something else of value. For example, when buying an item of clothing or a gallon of milk, a pre-determined amount of money is exchanged for the product the customer is purchasing; therefore, they have received something but have given up something of equal value in return.

=== United Kingdom ===
In the United Kingdom, the one-sidedness of a contract is covered by the Unfair Contract Terms Act 1977 and various revisions and amendments to it; a clause can be held void or the entire contract void if it is deemed unfair (that is to say, one-sided and not a quid pro quo); however, this is a civil law and not a common law matter.

Political donors must be resident in the UK. There are fixed limits to how much they may donate (£5000 in any single donation), and it must be recorded in the House of Commons Register of Members' Interests or at the House of Commons Library; the quid pro quo is strictly not allowed, that a donor can by his donation have some personal gain. This is overseen by the Parliamentary Commissioner for Standards. There are also prohibitions on donations being given in the six weeks before the election for which it is being campaigned. It is also illegal for donors to support party political broadcasts, which are tightly regulated, free to air, and scheduled and allotted to the various parties according to a formula agreed by Parliament and enacted with the Communications Act 2003.

=== United States ===
In the United States, if an exchange appears excessively one sided, courts in some jurisdictions may question whether a quid pro quo did actually exist and the contract may be held void. In cases of "quid pro quo" business contracts, the term takes on a negative connotation because major corporations may cross ethical boundaries in order to enter into these very valuable, mutually beneficial, agreements with other major big businesses. In these deals, large sums of money are often at play and can consequently lead to promises of exclusive partnerships indefinitely or promises of distortion of economic reports.

In the U.S., lobbyists are legally entitled to support candidates that hold positions with which the donors agree, or which will benefit the donors. Such conduct becomes bribery only when there is an identifiable exchange between the contribution and official acts, previous or subsequent, and the term quid pro quo denotes such an exchange.

In terms of criminal law, quid pro quo tends to get used as a euphemism for crimes such as extortion and bribery.

==== Sexual harassment ====
In United States labor law, workplace sexual harassment can take two forms; either "quid pro quo" harassment or hostile work environment harassment. "Quid pro quo" harassment takes place when a supervisor requires sex, sexual favors, or sexual contact from an employee/job candidate as a condition of their employment. Only supervisors who have the authority to make tangible employment actions (i.e. hire, fire, promote, etc.), can commit "quid pro quo" harassment. The supervising harasser must have "immediate (or successively higher) authority over the employee." The power dynamic between a supervisor and subordinate/job candidate is such that a supervisor could use their position of authority to extract sexual relations based on the subordinate/job candidate's need for employment. Co-workers and non-decision making supervisors cannot engage in "quid pro quo" harassment with other employees, but an employer could potentially be liable for the behavior of these employees under a hostile work environment claim. The harassing employee's status as a supervisor is significant because if the individual is found to be a supervisor then the employing company can be held vicariously liable for the actions of that supervisor. Under Agency law, the employer is held responsible for the actions of the supervisor because they were in a position of power within the company at the time of the harassment.

To establish a prima facie case of "quid pro quo" harassment, the plaintiff must prove that they were subjected to "unwelcome sexual conduct", that submission to such conduct was explicitly or implicitly a term of their employment, and submission to or rejection of this conduct was used as a basis for an employment decision, as follows:

- Unwelcome Sexual Conduct: a court will look at the employee's conduct to determine whether the supervisor's sexual advances were unwelcome. In Meritor Savings Bank v. Vinson, the Court opined that voluntary sex between an employee and supervisor does not establish proof that a supervisor's sexual advances were welcome. The Court also stated that evidence of the subordinate employee's provocative dress and publicly expressed sexual fantasies can be introduced as evidence if relevant.
- Term of Employment: a term or condition of employment means that the subordinate/job candidate must acquiesce to the sexual advances of the supervisor in order to maintain/be hired for the job. In essence, the sexual harassment becomes a part of their job. For example, a supervisor promises an employee a raise if they go out on a date with the supervisor, or tells an employee they will be fired if the employee doesn't sleep with them.
- Tangible Employment Action: a tangible employment action must take place as a result of the employee's submission or refusal of supervisor's advances. In Burlington Industries, Inc. v. Ellerth, the Court stated that tangible employment action amounted to "a significant change in employment status, such as hiring, firing, failing to promote, reassignment with significantly different responsibilities, or a decision causing a significant change in benefits." Only supervisors can make tangible employment actions, since they have the company's authority to do so. The Court also held that unfulfilled threats by a supervisor of an adverse employment decision are not sufficient to establish a "Quid pro quo," but were relevant for the purposes of a hostile work environment claim. Additionally, the Supreme Court has held that constructive dismissal can count as a tangible employment action (thus allowing a quid pro quo sexual harassment claim) if the actions taken by a supervisor created a situation where a "reasonable person ... would have felt compelled to resign."

Once the plaintiff has established these three factors, the employer can not assert an affirmative defense (such as the employer had a sexual harassment policy in place to prevent and properly respond to issues of sexual harassment), but can only dispute whether the unwelcome conduct did not in fact take place, the employee was not a supervisor, and that there was no tangible employment action involved.

Although these terms are popular among lawyers and scholars, neither "hostile work environment" nor "quid pro quo" are found in Title VII of the Civil Rights Act of 1964, which prohibits employers from discriminating on the basis of race, sex, color, national origin, and religion. The Supreme Court noted in Burlington Industries, Inc. v. Ellerth that these terms are useful in differentiating between cases where threats of harassment are "carried out and those where they are not or absent altogether," but otherwise these terms serve a limited purpose. Therefore, sexual harassment can take place by a supervisor, and an employer can be potentially liable, even if that supervisor's behavior does not fall within the criteria of a "Quid pro quo" harassment claim.

==== Donald Trump impeachment inquiry ====
Quid pro quo was frequently mentioned during the first impeachment inquiry into U.S. president Donald Trump, in reference to the charge that his request for an investigation of Hunter Biden was a precondition for the delivery of congressionally authorized military aid during a call with Ukrainian president Volodymyr Zelenskyy.

== Other meanings ==
For languages that come from Latin, such as Italian, Portuguese, Spanish and French, quid pro quo is used to define a misunderstanding or blunder made by the substituting of one thing for another. The Oxford English Dictionary describes this alternative definition in English as "now rare". The Vocabolario Treccani (an authoritative dictionary published by the Encyclopedia Treccani), under the entry "qui pro quo", states that the latter expression probably derives from the Latin used in late medieval pharmaceutical compilations. This can be clearly seen from the work appearing precisely under this title, "Tractatus quid pro quo," (Treatise on what substitutes for what) in the medical collection headed up by Mesue cum expositione Mondini super Canones universales... (Venice: per Joannem & Gregorium de gregorijs fratres, 1497), folios 334r-335r. Some examples of what could be used in place of what in this list are: Pro uva passa dactili ('in place of raisins, [use] dates'); Pro mirto sumac ('in place of myrtle, [use] sumac'); Pro fenugreco semen lini ('in place of fenugreek, [use] flaxseed'), etc. This list was an essential resource in the medieval apothecary, especially for occasions when certain essential medicinal substances were not available.

Satirist Ambrose Bierce defined political influence as "a visionary quo given in exchange for a substantial quid", making a pun on quid as a form of currency.

== See also ==
- Barter
- Ethics of philanthropy
- Eye for an eye
- Golden Rule
- List of Latin phrases
- Offset agreement
- Logrolling
- Pay-to-play
- Shill
