= Marybeth Gasman =

American historian

Marybeth Gasman is Samuel DeWitt Proctor Endowed Chair in Education and a Distinguished Professor at Rutgers University. She was appointed as Associate Dean for Research in the Rutgers Graduate School of Education in the fall of 2021 and was elected Chair of the Rutgers University-New Brunswick Faculty Council in 2021. In 2026, Gasman was selected to be the editor (along with Andrés Castro Samayoa) of Educational Researcher for the 2027-2029 term. Educational Researcher is the premier journal of the American Educational Research Association. In addition to these roles, Gasman is the executive director of the Samuel DeWitt Proctor Institute for Leadership, Equity, & Justice as well as the Rutgers Center for Minority Serving Institutions. Since 2021, Gasman has been a contributing writer for Forbes.com.

== Biography ==
Gasman received a Bachelor of Arts in Political Science and Communication at St. Norbert College (1990) and an M.S. (1992) and Ph.D. (2000) in Higher Education and Law at Indiana University Bloomington. A historian of higher education, she currently holds the Samuel DeWitt Proctor Endowed Chair in Education and is a Distinguished Professor in the Graduate School of Education at Rutgers University, which she joined in 2019. Gasman also serves as the Associate Dean for Research in the Graduate School of Education and was the Chair of the Rutgers University-New Brunswick Faculty Council. In 2026, Gasman was selected to be the editor (along with Andrés Castro Samayoa) of Educational Researcher for the 2027-2029 term. The editors also set plans for special issues focused on minority-serving institutions and on historical methods used in education research. Gasman and Castro Samayoa are working together on a new book, In Community, We Can: Why Latine Graduate Students Succeed Together and How Academia Needs to Change. It is slated to be published by Princeton University Press. Gasman is the executive director of both the Samuel DeWitt Proctor Institute for Leadership, Equity, and Justice, and the Rutgers Center for Minority Serving Institutions. She was a faculty member at the University of Pennsylvania from 2003 to 2019 where she held the Judy & Howard Berkowitz Professor of Education.

She is one of the leading authorities in the country on historically black colleges (HBCUs). She is on the board of trustees of two Historically Black Colleges and Universities—Paul Quinn College in Dallas, Texas and Morris Brown College in Atlanta, Georgia.

Gasman served as the vice president of the history and historiography section of the American Educational Research Association from 2011 to 2014, and as the chair of the American Association of University Professor's Committee on HBCUs. In 2006, Gasman received the Association for the Study of Higher Education's Promising Scholar/Early Career Award, and in 2008 she won the Penn Excellence in Teaching Award and in 2017, she was awarded the Penn Provost's Award for Excellence in Ph.D. Mentoring and Advising.

Gasman has appeared in two PBS documentaries. In 2022 she was in Making Black America: Through the Grapevine, written and produced by Henry Louis Gates Jr. In 2017, she appeared in Tell Them We Are Rising: The Story of Historically Black Colleges and Universities directed by Stanley Nelson Jr. and Marco Williams. In both documentaries she discussed her historical research related to Historically Black Colleges and Universities. In 2022, an interview pertaining to her book Doing the Right Thing: How Colleges and Universities Can Undo Systemic Racism in Faculty Hiring was featured on BookTV.

On August 27, 2019, Inside Higher Education published an article about Gasman, and anonymous allegations made against her for "fostering a hypersexualized and racially insensitive climate" by former student assistants in 2017. An investigation did not produce public results, though "cultural" changes were allegedly made by the university. The Dean of the Graduate School of Education at the University of Pennsylvania did not comment on the article as the university does not comment on personnel issues. The University of Pennsylvania Provost said Gasman "got an excellent offer from Rutgers and chose to take it." On September 1, 2019, Gasman moved to Rutgers University, which, according to the university, "vetted her before appointing her as Distinguished Professor and the Samuel DeWitt Proctor Endowed Chair in Education".

== Publications ==
=== Books ===
- Why Historically Black Colleges and Universities Matter, Teachers College Press, 2025)
- HBCU: The Power of Historically Black Colleges and Universities, (with Levon Esters, Johns Hopkins University Press, 2024)
- Doing the Right Thing: How to Undo Systemic Racism in Faculty Hiring, Princeton University Press, 2022)
- Candid Advice for New Faculty: How to Secure Tenure and Advance Your Career, Myers Education Press, 2021)
- Making Black Scientists: A Call to Action (with Thai-Huy Nguyen, Harvard University Press, 2019)
- Educating a Diverse Nation: Lessons from Minority Serving Institutions (with Clif Conrad), Harvard University Press, 2017).
- The Morehouse Mystique: Becoming a Doctor at the Nation's Newest African American Medical School (with Louis Sullivan), Johns Hopkins University Press, 2012.
- Envisioning Black Colleges: A History of the United Negro College Fund (2007), cited as "an invaluable contribution" to the field of higher education for African Americans and to "the general area of the history of higher education.
- The Essential Guide to Fundraising from Diverse College Alumni (with Nelson Bowman)
- Booker T. Washington Rediscovered (with Michael Bieze), Johns Hopkins University Press.
- A Guide to Fundraising at Historically Black Colleges and Universities: An All Campus Approach (with Nelson Bowman), Routledge, 2010
- Race, Gender, and Leadership in Nonprofit Organizations (with Noah D. Drezner, Edward Epstein, Tyrone Freeman, and Vida Avery)
- Unearthing Promise and Potential: Our Nation's Historically Black College and Universities (with Valerie Lundy Wagner, Tafaya Ransom, and Nelson Bowman)
- Charles S. Johnson: Leadership beyond the Veil in the Age of Jim Crow (with Patrick J. Gilpin), 2003.
- Supporting Alma Mater: Successful Strategies for Securing Funds from Black College Alumni (with Sibby Anderson-Thompkins), 2003

=== Edited collections ===
- A Primer on Minority Serving Institutions (with Andrés Castro Samayoa)
- Contemporary Issues in Higher Education (with Andrés Castro Samayoa) *Educational Challenges and Opportunities at Minority Serving Institutions] (with Andrés Castro Samayoa, William Casey Poland, and Paola Esmieu)
- Academics Going Public
- Opportunities and Challenges at Historically Black Colleges and Universities (with Felecia Commodore)
- Exploring Diversity at Historically Black Colleges and Universities: Implications for Policy and Practice (with Robert Palmer and Robert Shorette)
- Fostering Success of Ethnic and Racial Minorities in STEM: The Role of Minority Serving Institutions (with Robert Palmer and Dina Maramba)
- The History of Higher Education: Methods for Uncovering the Past
- Gender and Educational Philanthropy: New Perspectives on Funding, Collaboration, and Assessment (with Alice Ginsberg)
- ''Understanding Minority Serving Institutions (with Benjamin Baez and Caroline Turner)
- Historically Black Colleges and Universities: Triumphs, Troubles, and Taboos (with Christopher Tudico)
- Philanthropy, Fundraising, and Volunteerism in Higher Education (with Andrea Walton)
- Uplifting a People: African American Philanthropy and Education (with Kate Sedgwick)
