= The Dusters =

Nashville-based blues-rock trio

The Dusters are a Nashville-based blues rock trio, formed in 1986 by three college friends, Ken McMahan (guitar and vocals), David Barnette (bass) and Leo Overtoom (drums).

The band released three albums on Reptile Records in the US and three on Dixiefrog Records in Europe. The band was part of the Miller Genuine Draft band network and recorded a national radio spot for MGD's "Tap into The Cold" campaign during the late 1980s and toured internationally until the early 1990s.

Their first release, in 1988, Red and Hot and Ready to Roll, featured the original band. In a review of the three-song EP, the Austin American-Statesman called the music "'60s blues-rock revisited, with a big, raunchy beat, fat chords and growling vocals." That same year, Nashville Scene voted the Dusters "best Nashville band". For the second release, 1990's This Ain't No Jukebox... We're a Rock n' Roll Band, Leo Overtoom was replaced mid-session by Chris Sherlock. The band played at the South by Southwest festival. In a review of one of their performances, critic Michael Point wrote, "[T]he band's basic tool is its unrelenting boogie beat. Songs like 'This Ain't No Jukebox' and 'The Truck Won't Start' work on the reduced boogie level, but their appeal to any but the most devoted Southern-rock fans is limited."

The final Reptile Records release, Unlisted Number, in 1997, featured Jeff Perkins on drums and Bobbie Keys on saxophone.

In 2002, a reunited Dusters with Jeff Perkins recorded with Dan Baird (The Georgia Satellites) and released Dang! on DixieFrog Records. Since that release the band has been working on their next project, recording with artists such as Pinetop Perkins (Muddy Waters), J.M. Van Eaton (Jerry Lee Lewis), Mike Scaccia (Ministry), Al Jourgensen (Ministry) and Nick Kane (The Mavericks)
