= Faragher v. City of Boca Raton =

- Supreme Court of the United States

Argued March 25, 1998 Decided June 26, 1998
- Full case name: Beth Ann Faragher, Petitioner v. City of Boca Raton, Florida
- Citations: 524 U.S. 775 (more) 118 S. Ct. 2275; 141 L. Ed. 2d 662; 1998 U.S. LEXIS 4216; 66 U.S.L.W. 4643; 77 Fair Empl. Prac. Cas. (BNA) 14; 73 Empl. Prac. Dec. (CCH) ¶ 45,341; 157 A.L.R. Fed. 663; 98 Cal. Daily Op. Service 5048; 98 Daily Journal DAR 7000; 1998 Colo. J. C.A.R. 3375; 11 Fla. L. Weekly Fed. S 699
- Argument: Oral argument

Case history
- Prior: Ruling in favor of plaintiff, 864 F. Supp. 1552 (S.D. Fla. 1994); reversed, 76 F.3d 1155 (11th Cir. 1996); vacated, 83 F.3d 1346 (11th Cir. 1996); on rehearing en banc, 111 F.3d 1530 (11th Cir. 1997); cert. granted, 522 U.S. 978 (1997).
- Subsequent: On remand, 166 F.3d 1152 (11th Cir. 1999).

Holding
- An employer is vicariously liable for actionable discrimination caused by a supervisor, but subject to an affirmative defense looking to the reasonableness of the employer's conduct as well as that of the plaintiff.

Court membership
- Chief Justice William Rehnquist Associate Justices John P. Stevens · Sandra Day O'Connor; Antonin Scalia · Anthony Kennedy; David Souter · Clarence Thomas; Ruth Bader Ginsburg · Stephen Breyer

Case opinions
- Majority: Souter, joined by Rehnquist, Stevens, O'Connor, Kennedy, Ginsburg, Breyer
- Dissent: Thomas, joined by Scalia

Faragher v. City of Boca Raton, 524 U.S. 775 (1998), is a US labor law case of the United States Supreme Court in which the Court identified the circumstances under which an employer may be held liable under Title VII of the Civil Rights Act of 1964 for the acts of a supervisory employee whose sexual harassment of subordinates has created a hostile work environment amounting to employment discrimination. The court held that "an employer is vicariously liable for actionable discrimination caused by a supervisor, but subject to an affirmative defense looking to the reasonableness of the employer's conduct as well as that of a plaintiff victim."

== Facts ==
The case centered around a lifeguard resigning her position. In 1992, Beth Ann Faragher brought to the city's attention that her supervisors, Bill Terry and David Silverman, had created a "sexually hostile atmosphere" at work and there was constant offensive touching which was not invited. The two supervisors would also speak about women in offensive terms. "Following a bench trial, the District Court concluded that the supervisors' conduct was discriminatory harassment sufficiently serious to alter the conditions of Faragher's employment and constitute an abusive working environment." The complaint contained specific allegations that Terry once said that he would never promote a woman to the rank of lieutenant, and that Silverman had said to Faragher, "Date me or clean the toilets for a year." Faragher states that there were many times these two supervisors had said things to her and other female lifeguards, and other lifeguards agreed.

Faragher stated that from time to time, Terry would repeatedly touch the female lifeguards without being invited to do so, and in areas that should not be touched without being invited. Silverman, the other supervisor would make frequent vulgar slurs to the females, such as referencing oral sex and speaking about female matters. Faragher was not the only woman that was being spoken to this way, in fact another lifeguard, Nancy Ewanchew, had brought it to the City's Personnel Director in an effort to put a stop to the way they were being spoken to, but the taunting did not stop. However, a major factor held against Faragher was if this problem had been going on for a while, then it should have been brought to the City's attention earlier.

== Judgment ==
The Court noted that "Terry and Silverman were acting outside of the scope of their employment and solely to further their own personal needs." The Eleventh Circuit had stated that the supervisors' relationship with the City did not assist in why they were treating their co-workers this way. In this case, the court stated that neither Terry nor Silverman threatened to fire Faragher or demote her so their agency relationship did not "facilitate their harassment." "The court reviewed the record and found no adequate factual basis to conclude that the harassment was so pervasive that the City should have known of it, relying on the facts that the harassment occurred intermittently, over a long period of time, and at a remote location." The court felt that if this was such a serious issue taking place at the workplace that these lifeguards, such as Faragher herself, should have brought it to the City's attention earlier.

Faragher stated that in many ways the agency relationship "aided Terry and Silverman in carrying out their harassment." She argued that these two supervisors abused their authority to keep the workers in their place while they make offensive statements. The Court Of Appeals rejected liability on the City's behalf and that the employer is not liable for what their employees do. The City feels that they should not be held responsible for what the employees did at the workplace. The court debated that since the victim did not receive any harm then the employer should not be held responsible for the actions of their employees. However, Faragher stated that she was working for the City and they should be the ones held responsible.

Justice David H. Souter delivered the opinion of the Court. The Court considered the interaction between prior sexual harassment cases and the Restatement of Agency, and found that the City is responsible for the employer's actions based on Title VII, subject to an affirmative defense.
