= Alfreda Duster =

American social worker and civic leader (1904–1983)

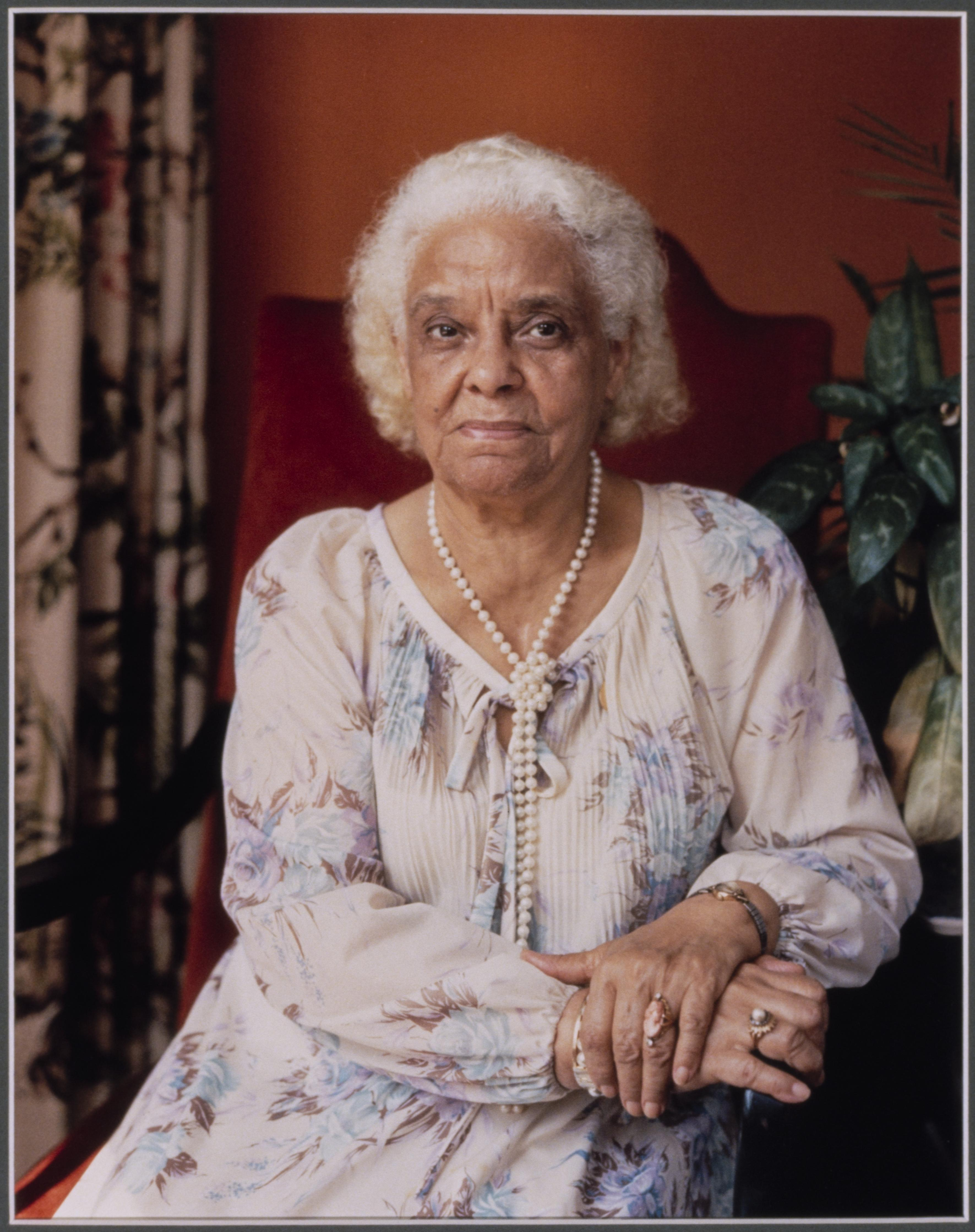
- Alfreda Barnett Duster in 1982
- Born: Alfreda Barnett; September 3, 1904; Chicago, Illinois
- Died: April 2, 1983 (aged 78); Billings Hospital, Chicago
- Notable work: Crusade for Justice: The Autobiography of Ida B. Wells (1970)
- Spouse: Benjamin C. Duster Jr.
- Children: 5, including Troy Duster
- Parent(s): Ida B. Wells (mother); Ferdinand L. Barnett (father)

Alfreda M. Duster (née Barnett; September 3, 1904 – April 2, 1983) was an American social worker and civic leader in Chicago. She is best known as the youngest daughter of civil rights activist Ida B. Wells and as the editor of her mother's posthumously published autobiography, Crusade for Justice: The Autobiography of Ida B. Wells (1970).

== Biography ==
Alfreda Barnett was born in 1904, the youngest daughter of civil rights activists Ida B. Wells and Ferdinand L. Barnett. She graduated from the University of Chicago in 1924 with a bachelor of philosophy degree. She married Benjamin C. Duster Jr., who was a clerk in her father's law firm, and worked as a homemaker and mother to her five children until she was widowed at the age of 40 and went back to school for social work.

Duster served as a juvenile delinquency prevention coordinator for the state of Illinois and the administrator of the girls' program for underprivileged city children at Camp Illini. She was also secretary to Democrat Charles Jenkins, a black member of the Illinois legislature. She was awarded "Mother of the Year" in 1950 and 1970; the Bootstrap Award from the Opportunity Centers of Chicago; Citation for Public Service from the University of Chicago Alumni Association; and honorary doctorate of humane letters from Chicago State University.

Duster edited and in 1970 published Ida B. Wells' autobiography, Crusade for Justice: The Autobiography of Ida B. Wells, which she worked on for 25 years after her mother's death. For this book, Duster won the National Council of Negro Women Award for Literary Excellence and Outstanding Humanitarian Contributions.

The Alfreda Barnett Duster Apartments, public housing in Chicago, Illinois, are named after Duster.

Alfreda Duster died from a brain hemorrhage at the age of 78, on April 2, 1983.
