= Windham Town Hall =

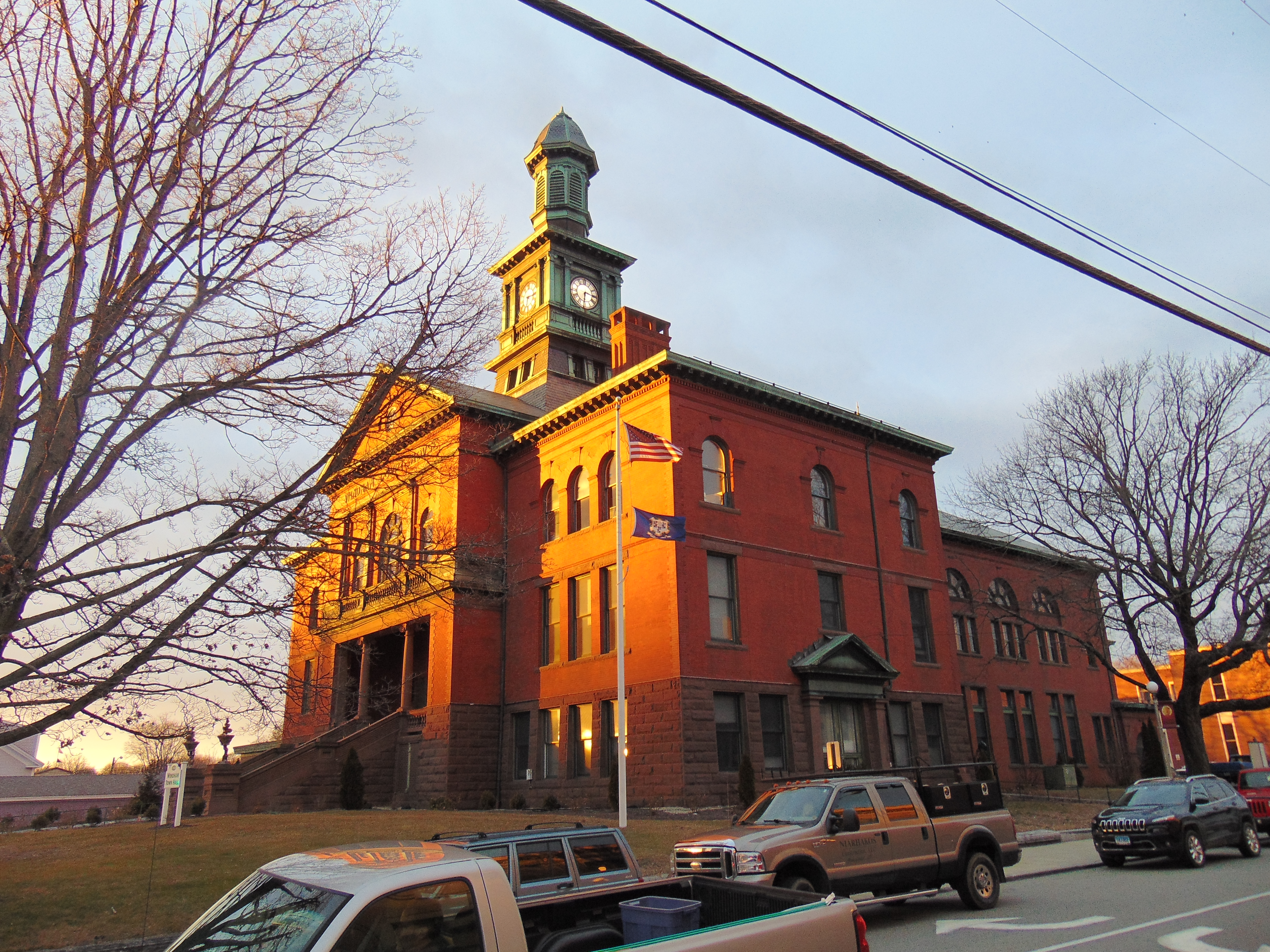
- The town hall in 2017

- Location within Connecticut
- Former names: Willimantic City Hall, Windham County Courthouse

General information
- Status: Completed
- Type: Town hall
- Architectural style: Romanesque Revival
- Location: Willimantic, Connecticut, United States
- Coordinates: 41.7131°N 72.2177°W
- Current tenants: Town of Windham
- Completed: 1896
- Opening: 1897
- Cost: $73,000 (equivalent to $2,683,028 in 2025)
- Owner: Town of Windham

Height
- Tip: 50 feet (15 m)
- Roof: 30 feet (9.1 m)

Technical details
- Material: Philadelphia pressed brick
- Size: 13,762 square feet (1,278.5 m^{2})
- Floor count: 3 floors
- Floor area: 41,286 square feet (3,835.6 m^{2})
- Grounds: 33,313 square feet (3,094.9 m^{2})

Design and construction
- Architect: Warren Richard Briggs

Website
- windhamct.com
- Windham Town Hall
- U.S. Historic district – Contributing property
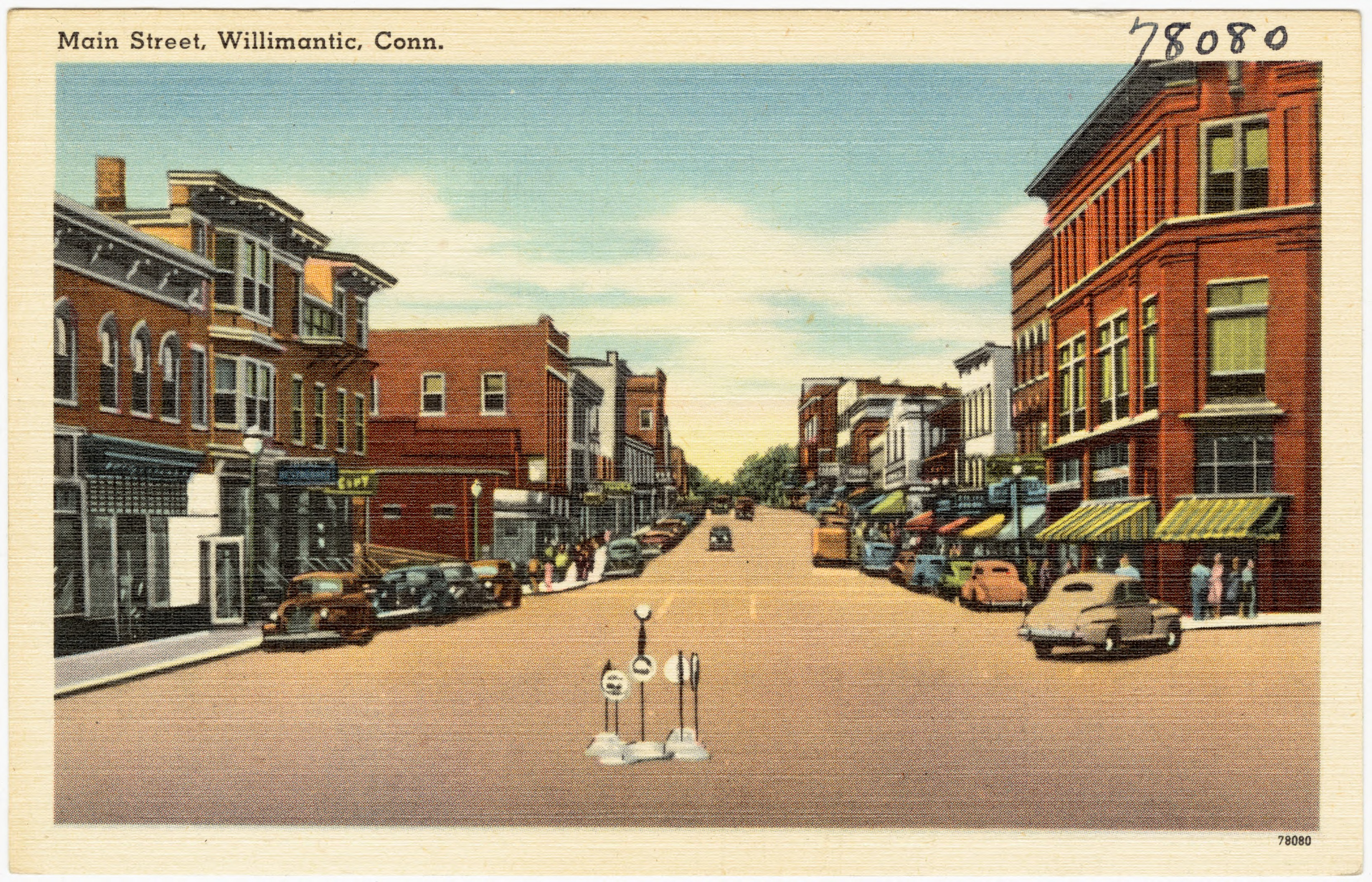
- A photo of Main St. in the 1930s
- Part of: Main Street Historic District (ID82004410)
- Designated CP: June 28, 1982

The Windham Town Hall is a town hall in Willimantic, Windham, Connecticut, United States.

== History ==
It was built in 1896 for the housing of the Windham County Courthouse and the Willimantic City Government. Before then, the government was held in a rented space in Hayden Block. It is made out of 1.25 million bricks, cost $73,000 (1895) to make, and contains a large clock donated by James Hayden. In 1915 President William Howard Taft visited the building. Warren Richard Briggs was the architect for the building, as he had made other courthouses similar to this in the state. At one point the building house county courtrooms, The city of Willimantic government, the local Grand Army of the Republic group, and the Town of Windham government.

=== Recent history ===
The police station, the county courthouse, and the city library relocated in 1977. It joined the Main Street Historic District, part of the National Register of Historic Places in 1982. The city hall became a town hall for Windham when Willimantic was downgraded to a CDP in 1983.

=== Gallery ===
Windham Town Hall

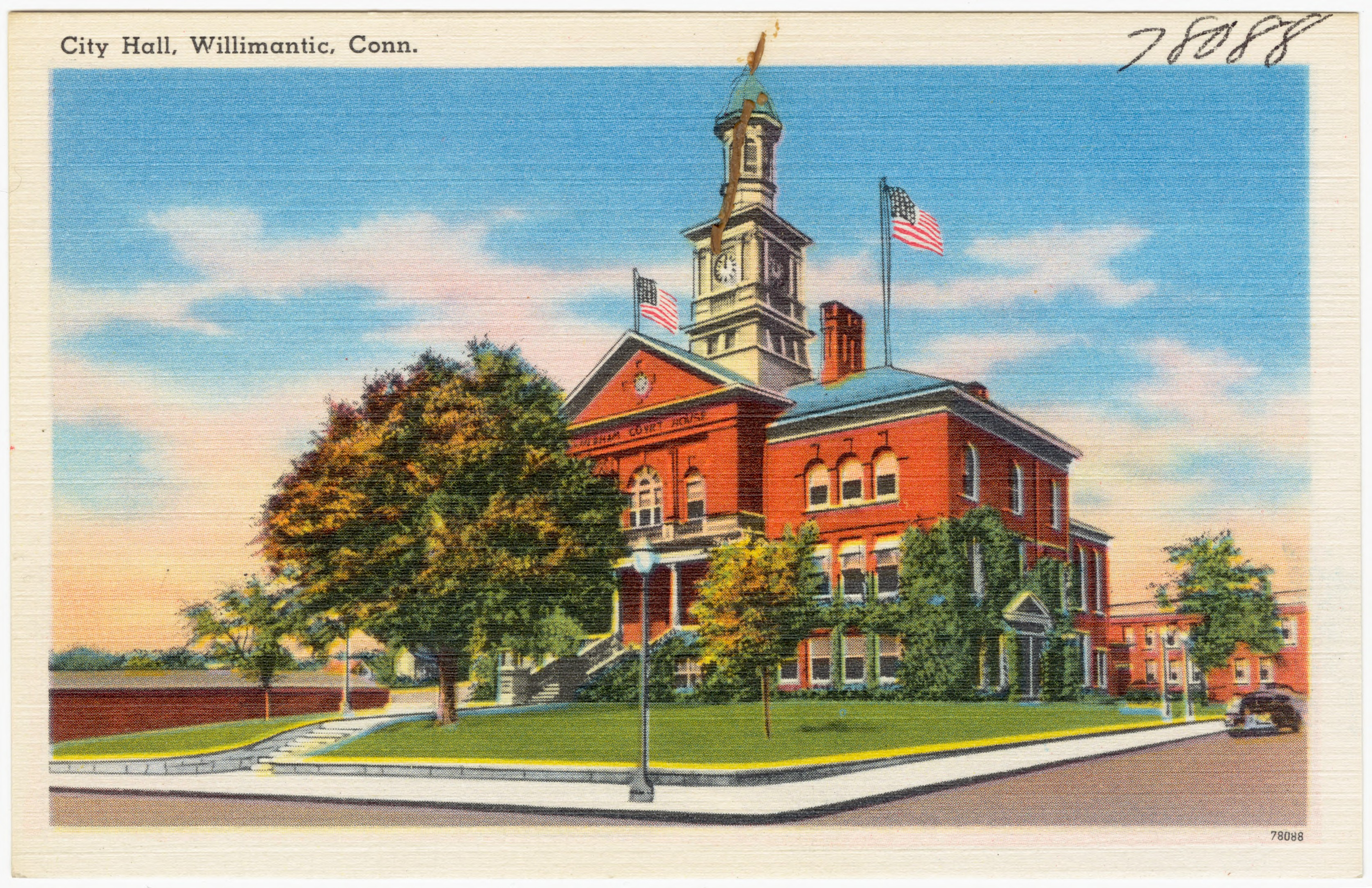
The town hall in the 1940s

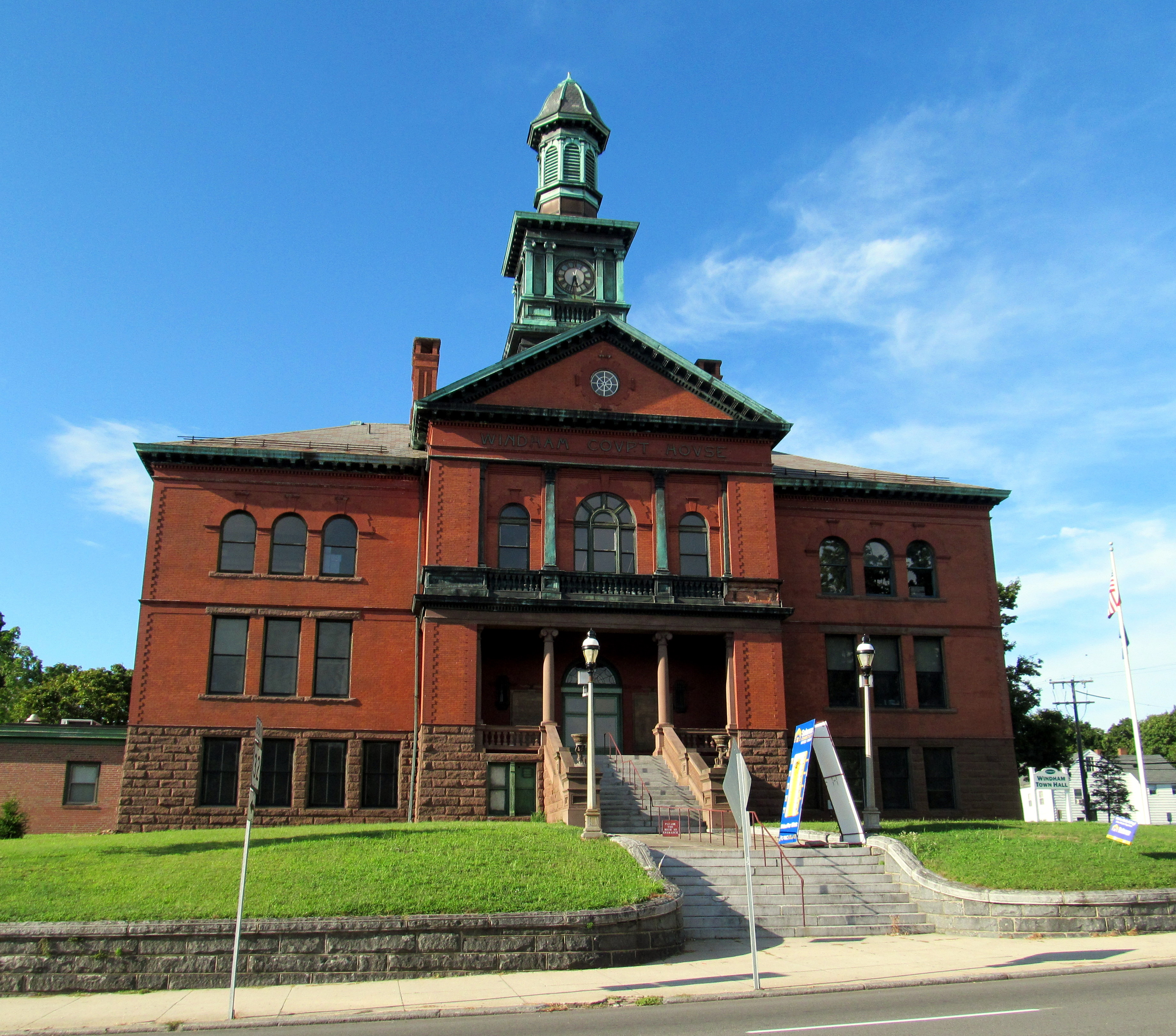
The town hall from the front

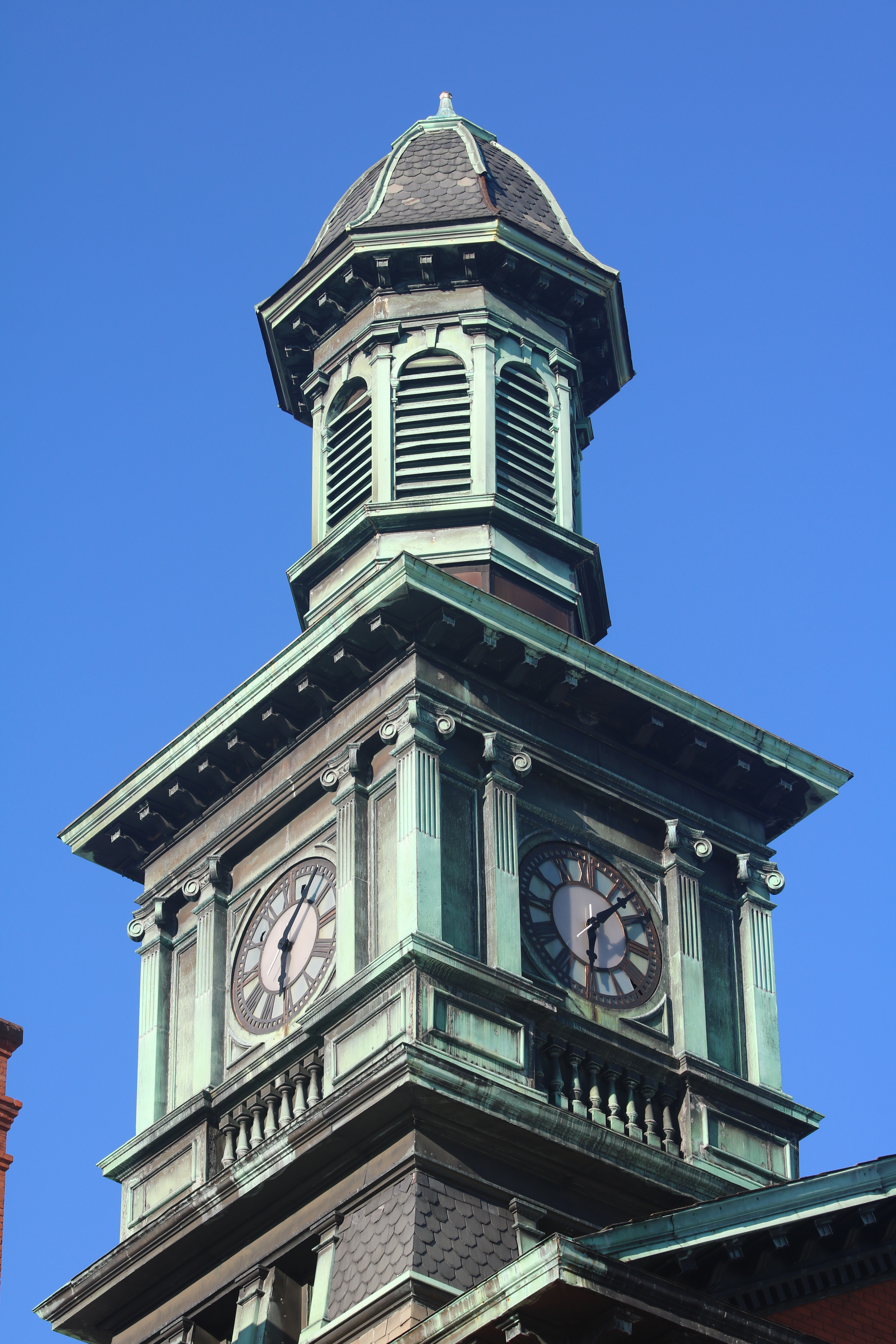
The top of the clock tower

== Description ==
The building is currently a large Romanesque Revival style building in general. It has a green clock tower on the top of the building, making the building 50 feet high. The building is 3 stories high, containing the offices of the town of Windham. It has a green area just outside of the building with a staircase leading from the street to the building.

== See also ==
- Willimantic Footbridge
- Jillson Mills
- Willimantic Freight House and Office
