= Prospect Hill Historic District (Willimantic, Connecticut) =

Historic district in Connecticut, United States

- U.S. National Register of Historic Places
- U.S. Historic district
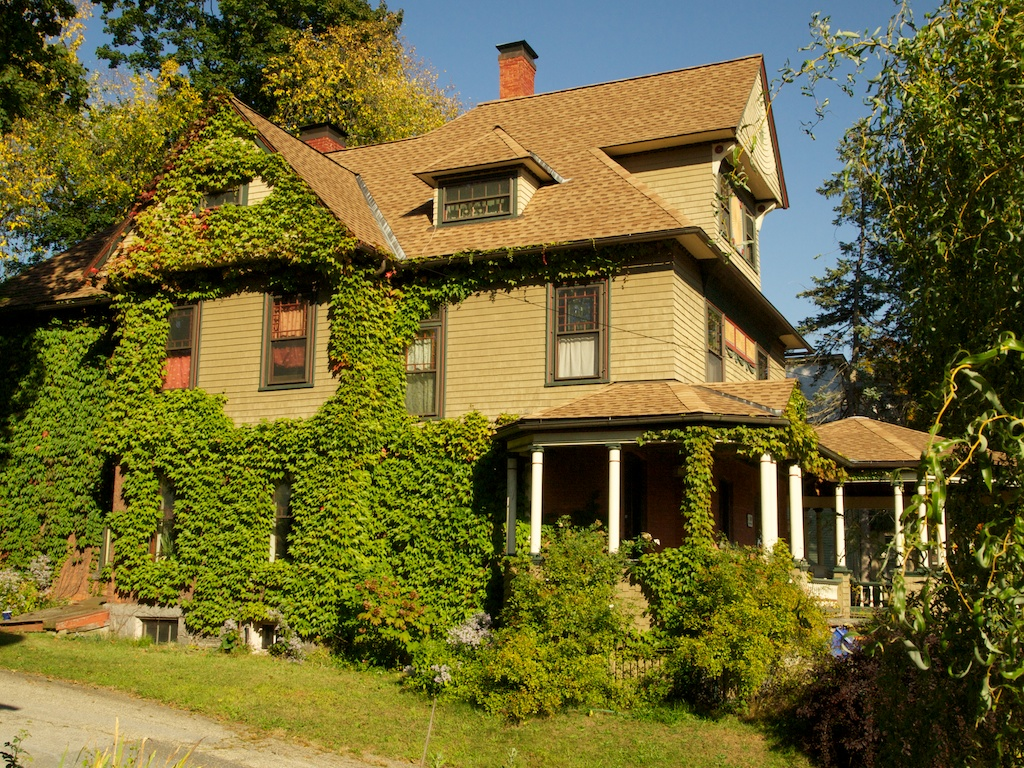

- Location within Connecticut Location within the United States
- Location: Roughly bounded by Bolivia Street, Jackson Street, Valley Street and Birch Street, Willimantic, Connecticut
- Coordinates: 41°43′9″N 72°12′12″W
- Area: 250 acres (100 ha)
- NRHP reference No.: 03000814
- Added to NRHP: August 29, 2003

The Prospect Hill Historic District encompasses a large residential area in the Willimantic section of Windham, Connecticut. Located north of the Main Street commercial district, it was developed between about 1865 and 1930, and is one of the state's largest historic districts, with more than 800 contributing buildings. It is roughly bounded by Valley, Jackson, Bolivia, Washburn, Windham, and High Streets, and contains one of the state's largest single concentrations of Victorian-era residential architecture. It was listed on the National Register of Historic Places in 2003.

== Description and history ==
Willimantic's industrial history began in the 18th century, when grist and saw mills were established along the Willimantic Falls section of the Willimantic River. In the first half of the 19th century, the mill privileges were converted to textile manufacturing, and were greatly expanded. The city also benefited from the convergence of several railroad lines, making it an important regional transit center. Its commercial business district formed north of the mills that lined the north bank of the river. Just to its north, the Prospect Hill area was developed as an accompanying residential area beginning in the early 1860s, when Valley Street was laid out parallel to Main Street. Over the next several decades, the street grid marched to the north, generally bounded by High Street to the west and Jackson Street to the east.

The historic district covers about 40 square blocks, and has nearly 1000 structures. Of these, 88% are considered historically significant, having been built between 1865 and 1930, representing a remarkably large and dense concentration of historic buildings. There are 600 houses, seven church complexes, six schools, and one firehouse. More than half of the housing was built before the turn of the 20th century. Dominant architectural styles are those that predate the First World War: Italianate, Second Empire, Queen Anne Victorian, Stick and Shingle styles are all well represented, although a substantial number of the examples are in vernacular forms.

== See also ==
- National Register of Historic Places listings in Windham County, Connecticut
