= Frog Bridge =

- One of the four copper frogs on the bridge
- Coordinates: 41.71°N 72.2094°W
- Carries: South Street (CT 661)
- Crosses: Willimantic River and New England Central Railroad
- Official name: Thread City Crossing
- Named for: Named after the city's history with thread mills
- Owner: Connecticut Department of Transportation
- Preceded by: An 1857 stone arch bridge, currently a garden bridge (CT 601)

Characteristics
- Design: Simple Compression Arch Bridge
- Material: Steel
- Total length: 476 feet (145 m)
- Width: 66 feet (20 m)
- No. of spans: 1
- No. of lanes: 4

History
- Designer: Connecticut Department of Transportation
- Constructed by: O & G Industries
- Construction start: March 1999
- Construction end: Fall 2001
- Construction cost: $13 million
- Opened: September 2000

Location
- Interactive map of Frog Bridge

The Frog Bridge (officially known as the Thread City Crossing) is a bridge located in Willimantic, Connecticut, which carries South Street (CT 661) across the Willimantic River. Opened in September 2000, it is known as the Frog Bridge because it has four copper frog sculptures on each end of the bridge, sitting on concrete thread spools. The sculptures were designed and created by artist Leo Jensen of Ivoryton, Connecticut.

== Naming ==
The design of the bridge relates to the local story of the "Battle of the Frogs". In 1754, thousands of bullfrogs in Frog Pond, about a mile east of Windham Center, awoke residents with loud croaking sounds. Many people mistook the sound for war drums or shouted words, and feared it was the French or Indians attacking the small town.

== History ==
=== Previous bridge ===
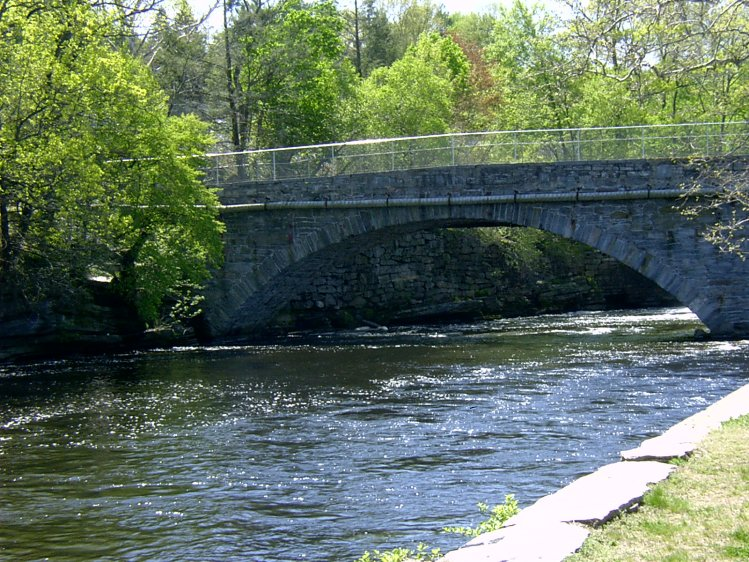
The old bridge

The bridge was built to replace an 1857 stone arch bridge located in the middle of the mill complex. The original bridge was planned to be replaced as early as 1872. Another effort to replace the old bridge was made at the turn of the 20th century, but ended up with a compromise resulting in the Willimantic Footbridge. The bridge was closed shortly after the opening of the Frog Bridge, remaining closed until October 2006 when it reopened as the Windham Garden on the Bridge, a pedestrian bridge.

=== Current bridge ===
In 1986, then-state legislator John Lescoe introduced a bill to fund a feasibility study for a new bridge over the Willimantic River. The funding was finally approved in 1991. The first design for the bridge just had the spools of thread but after the community did not approve it, an architect was hired from the state who added the frogs. The bridge started construction in March 1999 and it opened in September 2000 but full project for the surrounding area was not completed until the Fall of 2001. In 2002, the FHA awarded the Frog Bridge an honorable mention for Excellence in Highway Design in the category of Historic Preservation. The bridge was built over a man-made waterfall which used to provide power for the Jillson Mills.

== Design ==
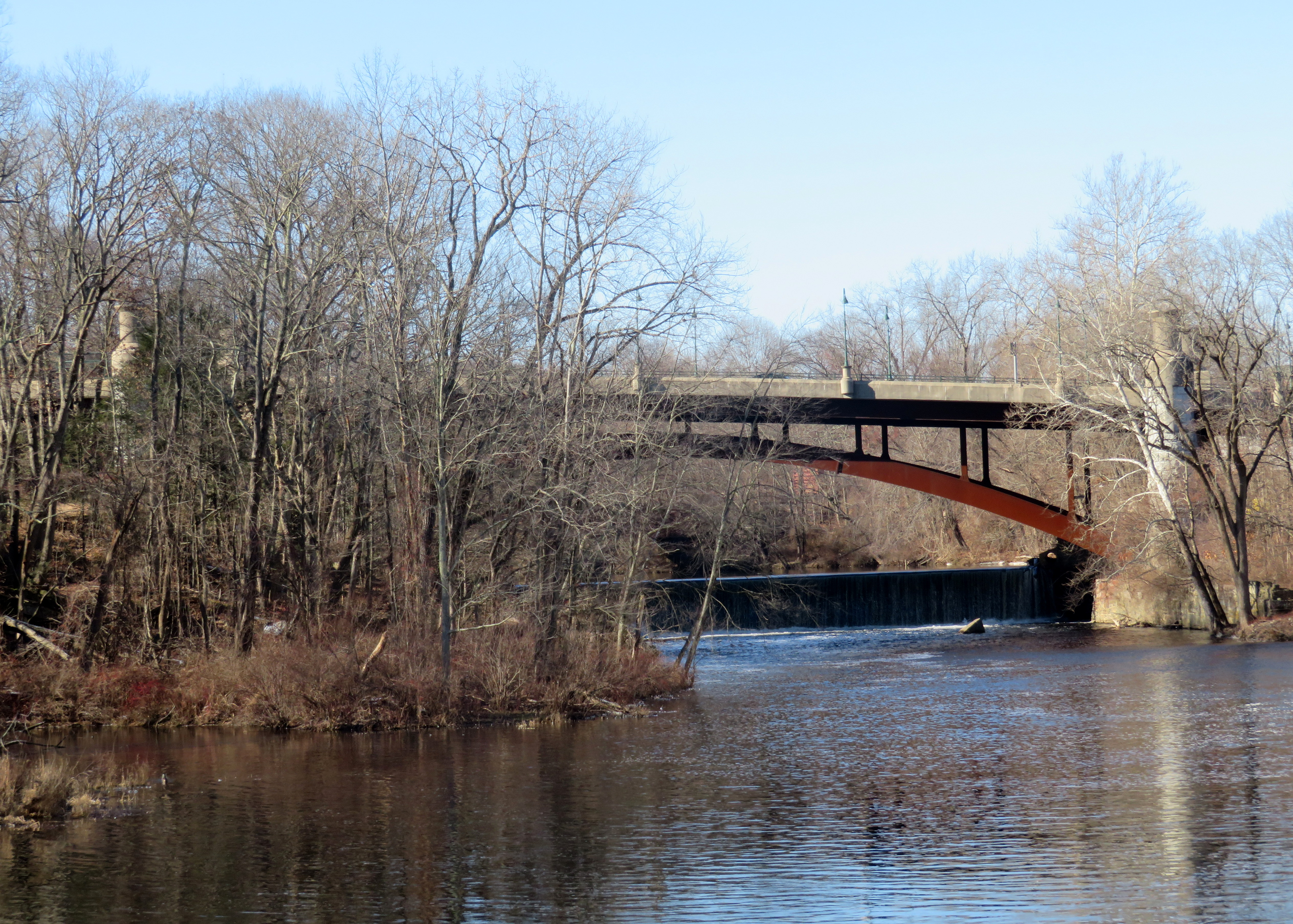
The Frog Bridge in December 2018

The bridge is a simple compression iron arch bridge that crosses the Willimantic River and a railroad line owned by the New England Central Railroad. It carries South St. that connects to Route 32 and Route 66. It has 8 concrete thread spools, 4 with green-colored copper frogs; the frogs' eyes are covered by gold leaf. The four frogs are named Manny, Willy, Windy and Swifty. Outside of the frogs, the bridge is more like a conventional highway bridge.

The Frog Bridge was depicted in Bill Griffith's comic strip Zippy in 2001.
