= Windham Textile and History Museum =

Coordinates: 41.7111°N 72.2064°W

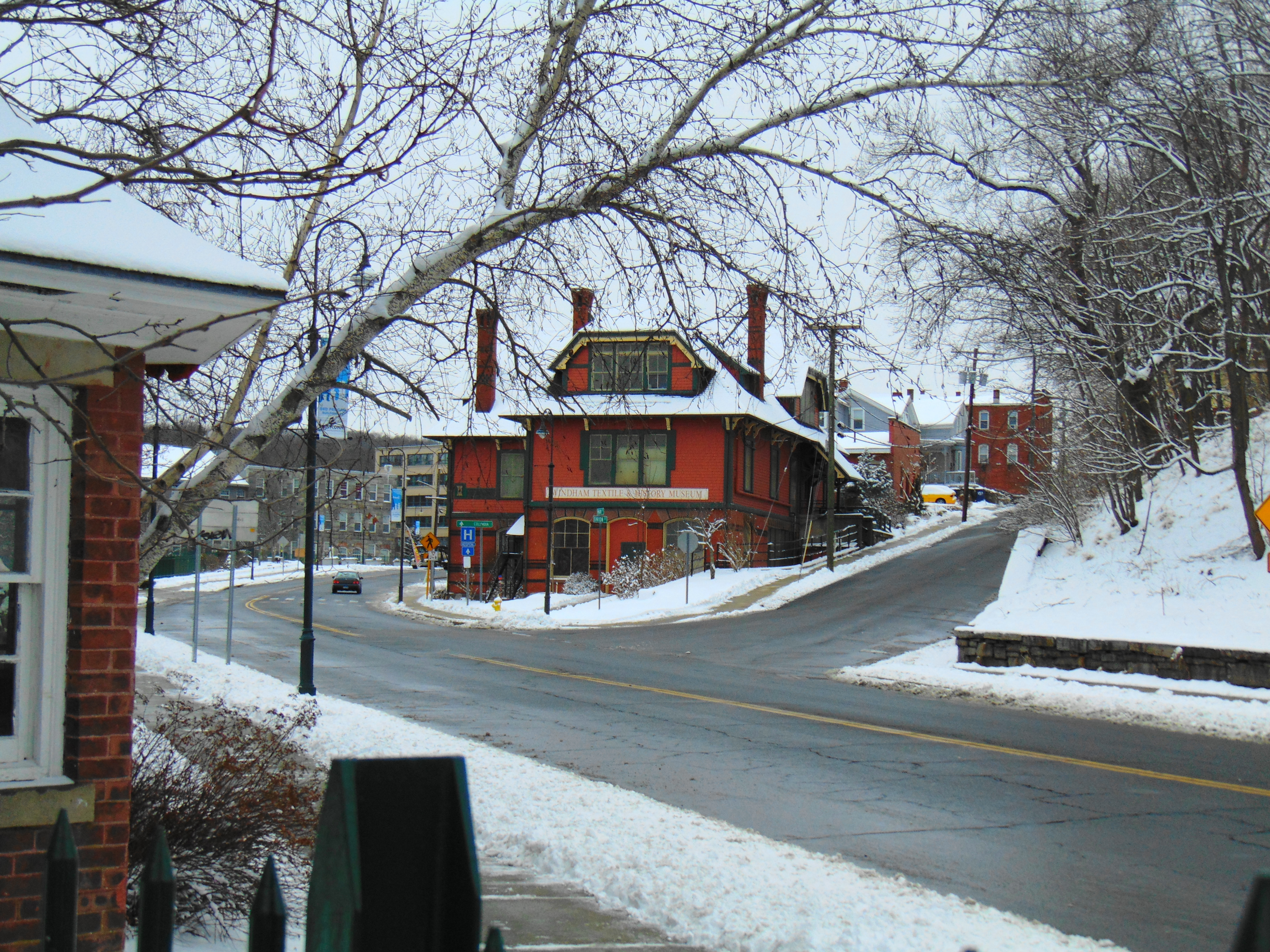
- The museum in early-2018.
- Established: 1995-2002
- Location: Willimantic, Connecticut
- Type: Textile museum
- CEO: Jamie H. Eves
- Website: millmuseum.org

The Windham Textile and History Museum is a museum in Willimantic, Connecticut, in the New England region of the United States. It is currently located in Main St.

== Exhibits ==
Its main focus is the Willimantic Linen Company's Willimantic mill, later purchased by the American Thread Company and closed in 1985. The museum is located in the former company store building.

The museum features the Brooke Shannon Antique Sewing Machine Room, which is a room which features replica sewing machines from the factory in the late-19th century. Other exhibits include a re-creation of the manager's office, a replica of the boarding houses in the 1880s. A tour of the mill property is part of the tour, but access inside in not included due to most of the mill being on private property. There are many other displays that feature what was life like during the turn of the century at the mill in Willimantic.

== Associated people ==
- Austin Cornelius Dunham was vice-president of the Willimantic Linen Company.
