= Ethel Paley =

American social worker, advocate for nursing home patients (1920-2019)

Ethel Paley (October 8, 1920 Flushing - November 18, 2019 Manhattan) was a social worker who advocated for the rights of nursing home patients and their families.

== Biography ==
Paley was born Ethel Louise Schneider to Herman, a restaurateur and Ida, a homemaker. They moved to Willimantic, Connecticut from Flushing, Queens during the Depression. She served in Washington, DC in 1943 as a member of the WAVES. When she returned, she used the G.I. Bill to attend Barnard College, earning a bachelor’s degree in American history and economics in 1949. She earned her Master of Social Work, with a concentration in community organization, from the Columbia University School of Social Work.

She was a resident of the West Village for over 60 years.

== Career ==
After Barnard, Paley worked at the New York City Housing Authority and directed the school’s career office.

Paley founded the non-profit Friends and Relatives of the Institutionalized Aged (FRIA) in 1976 which operated until its bankruptcy in 2011. Paley was the first executive director. Her work led to the formation of Long Term Care Community Coalition (LTCCC).

FRIA operated a hotline, available in English and Spanish and staffed by social work students.

== Awards and honors ==
Mario Cuomo presented Paley with the Governor’s Seniors of Distinction Award in 1994. In 2010, she received the L'Oréal Women of Worth Award and was inducted in the Columbia School of Social Work Hall of Fame in 2014.
