= Alfred Henry Noel =

American politician

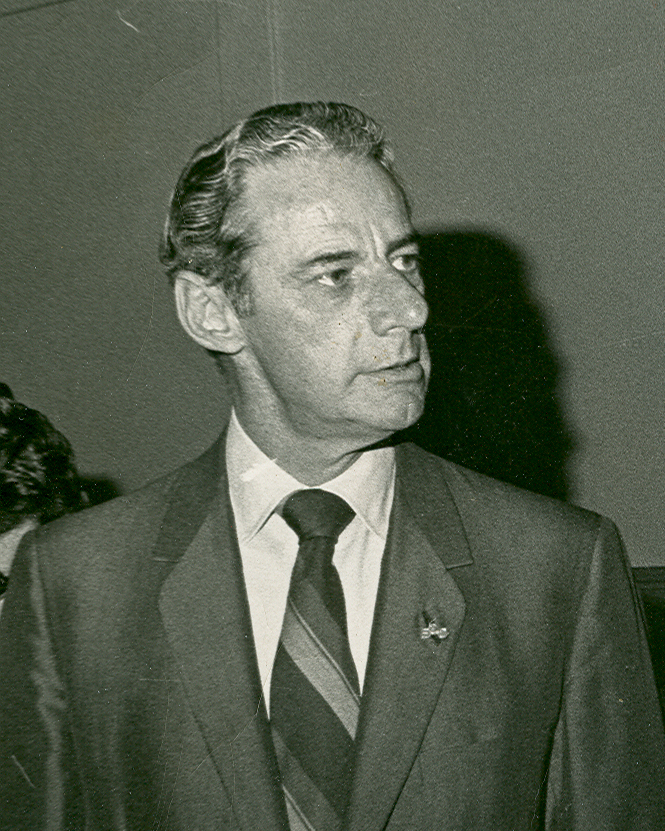
Noel, c. 1970

Alfred Henry Noel (May 18, 1915 – October 16, 2004) was an American politician who served as mayor of the town of Willimantic, Connecticut, from 1969 to 1971. Noel was a lifelong resident of Connecticut who began his political career as Alderman-At-Large for the town in 1952. He was subsequently appointed District Field Representative for the Committee on Special Revenues and served in both positions jointly. In 1969, Noel ran on the Democratic Party ticket to win election as mayor of Willimantic. Two years later, Noel lost re-election to Republican Florence MacFarlane, who became Willimantic's first female mayor. After this loss, Noel was appointed Housing Code Enforcement Officer, a position he held until his retirement.

== Personal life ==
Noel was known widely for his affable nature and affiliations with various charitable organizations. Former first selectman and Connecticut State Representative John Lescoe described Noel as an "impressive figure", while MacFarlane, on her first day as mayor, remarked on his generous and gracious demeanor. Noel was a lifelong member of the Benevolent Order of Elks and collaborated with actor Paul Newman in a number of fund-raising activities in the 1960s. Noel died of prostate cancer in 2004 in West Palm Beach, Florida, aged 89.
