= Julian Jordan (composer) =

American musician and vocal instructor (1850–1929)

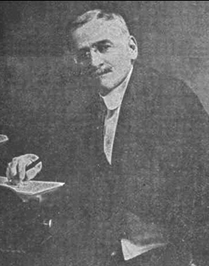
- Julian Jordan in 1917
- Born: November 10, 1850; Willimantic, Connecticut, U.S.
- Died: October 13, 1929; Westchester, New York, U.S.
- Occupations: Composer, vocal Instructor

Julian Jordan (November 10, 1850 – October 13, 1929) was an American composer, vocal instructor and singer. He worked with Willis Woodward & Co., a publisher in New York City's Tin Pan Alley. In 1887, he wrote his most successful composition, "The Song That Reached My Heart."

== The Song That Reached My Heart ==
"Mr. Jordan tells the following story of how he came to write "The Song that Reached My Heart." "Mr. Sayres, manager of the minstrel company, chanced to hear at one of the New York theaters a song entitled "The Song for Me," which introduced "Home! Sweet Home!" as a finish. The following day Mr. Sayres and I met. He spoke of the song he had heard and said that he would like to have me get it for use in this minstrel company. Naturally I objected to taking the composition of another man, being a song writer myself, and so I told Mr. Sayres that if he was desirous of having a song which would introduce the melody of "Home, Sweet Home" I believed that I could compose one which would be as effective as the one he wished me to obtain. The idea was favorable to him, and Mr. Sayres at once suggested as a title for the song that I was to compose, "The Song That Reached My Heart." "Take that for a title and go home and see what you can make of it" are the words Mr. Sayres used. I went home and the possessors of 100,000 copies of the song today know what I made of it." Willis Woodward, the song's publisher, regarded the piece "to be one of the most lasting and profitable "hits" in his long career."

Julian's twin brother, Jules Jordan, was also a composer and singer.
