= Jules Jordan (composer) =

American composer and operatic tenor (1850–1927)

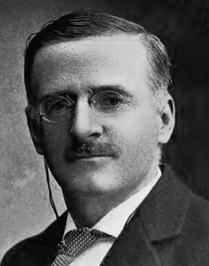
- Jules Jordan in 1880
- Born: Julius Jordan; November 10, 1850; Willimantic, Connecticut, U.S.
- Died: March 5, 1927 (aged 76); Providence, Rhode Island, U.S.
- Occupations: Composer, Singer, Vocal Instructor, Conductor
- Relatives: Julian Jordan (twin brother)

Julius "Jules" Jordan (November 10, 1850 – March 5, 1927) was an American composer, operatic tenor, vocal instructor and conductor.

Jordan took the leading part in two important American premieres: Berlioz's La' Damnation de Faust produced in 1880 at Steinway Hall, New York, under the direction of Leopold Damrosch, by the New York Oratorio Society in conjunction with the New York Arion Society and the Philharmonic Orchestra; and Gounod's "Redemption," produced in Boston in 1882 by the Boston Oratorio Society.

In 1880, he formed The Arion Club in Providence, RI., a mass choir that he conducted for more than 40 years. The activities of Jordan and the Arion Club cover a significant period of musical development in America, and Rhode Island shared in this activity with great interest. In a historical sense, the creation of the Arion Club was Jordan's most important contribution to Rhode Island music. Their performances included some of the greatest singers of the time including Melba and Lillian Nordica.

In 1895, Brown University conferred upon him the degree of Doctor of Music.

In 1897, The New York Times included him in a "Famous Conductors" article, adding "Mr. Jordan is a talented composer, and many of his songs have attained widespread popularity." Jordan's most notable works include his musical setting of Whittier's poem, Barbara Frietchie, his dramatic scene, Jael, debuted by Lillian Nordica, and his opera, Rip Van Winkle.

His twin brother, Julian Jordan was also a composer and singer.
