= Willimantic River =

River in Connecticut, United States

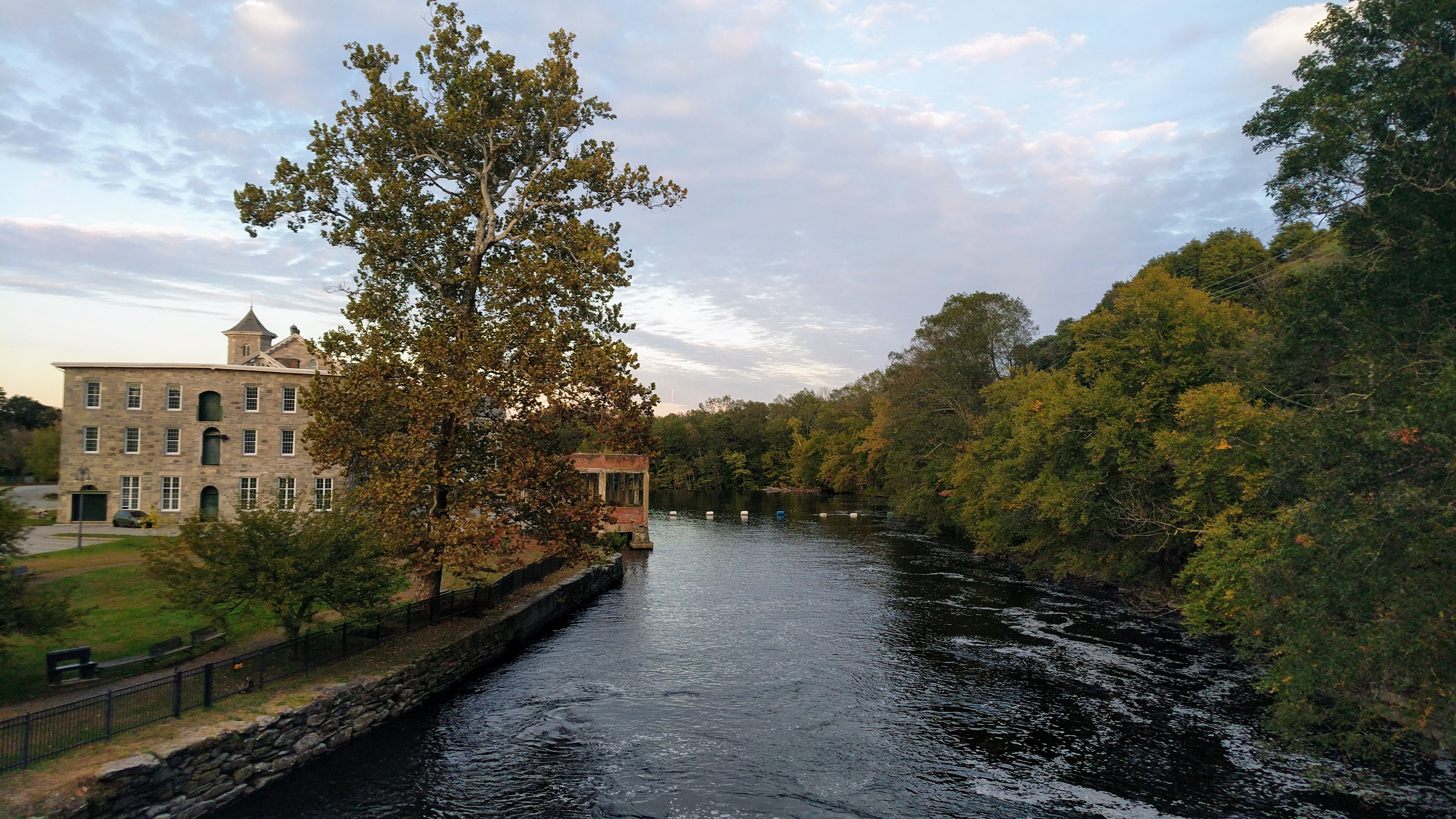
- The Willimantic River flows past the old American Thread Company mill in Willimantic.

Location
- Country: United States
- State: Connecticut
- Counties: Tolland, Windham, New London

Physical characteristics
- Source: Confluence of Middle River and Furnace Brook
  - location: Stafford Springs, Tolland County, Connecticut, United States
  - coordinates: 41°57′09″N 72°18′07″W
- Mouth: Confluence with Natchaug River to form Shetucket River
  - location: Willimantic, Windham County, Connecticut, United States
  - coordinates: 41°42′46″N 72°11′30″W
- Length: 25 mi (40 km)
- Basin size: 225 sq mi (580 km^{2})
- Discharge
  - location: Coventry, CT
  - average: 216 cu ft/s (6.1 m^{3}/s)Average, 1931-2005
  - minimum: 97.9 cu ft/s (2.77 m^{3}/s)Annual mean, 1965
  - maximum: 370 cu ft/s (10 m^{3}/s)Annual mean, 1938

The Willimantic River is a tributary of the Shetucket River, approximately 25 miles (40 km) long in northeastern Connecticut in the New England region of the United States.

It is formed in northern Tolland County, near Stafford Springs by the confluence of Middle River and Furnace Brook. It flows south to the city of Willimantic, where it joins the Natchaug River to form the Shetucket. It is joined by the Hop River on the Coventry, Columbia, and Windham town border. The river is also designated as a National Recreation Trail.

== Name ==
The word Willimantic is of Algonquian origin, either Mohegan-Pequot or Narragansett. It is commonly translated as "land of the swift running water", but the word more likely originally meant "place near the evergreen swamp". The word was first attested in English writing as Waramanticut in 1684, and later as Wallamanticuk, Wewemantic and Weammantuck before being standardized as Willimantic.

== Geography ==
Shortly upstream from its confluence with the Natchaug, the Willimantic experiences a drop of ninety feet in one mile. The river powered textile mills from Stafford Springs to Willimantic, including the American Thread Company mill. None of these mills are operating as of 2007, having all been destroyed or converted to other uses such as apartment space.

A popular long paddling route begins south of Stafford Springs along Route 32 where the river is mostly quickwater all of the way to the flatwater of Eagleville Pond. The remainder is fairly easy going to the take-out at Route 66. Beware of the dam at the Route 275 bridge. Other access points may be at the North River Road Bridge, the Route 74 Bridge, the Depot Road Bridge, the Route 195 Bridge, the Jones Crossing Bridge, the Merrow Road bridge, the U.S. Route 44 bridge, Brigham Bridge, near the Route 275 dam, the Depot Road Bridge, the Route 31 Bridge, and the Flanders Road Bridge.

== Crossings ==
County	Town	Carrying
Windham	Windham	Closed Bridge (Connected to ATC Mill 04.)
Windham	Windham	The Garden Bridge (Former Jillson Bridge)
Windham	Windham	South Street (Frog Bridge)
Windham	Windham	New England Central Railroad Providence and Worcester Railroad
Windham	Windham	Willimantic Footbridge
Windham	Windham	Route 32
Windham/Tolland	Windham/Columbia	Air Line State Park Trail
Windham/Tolland	Windham/Columbia	Route 66
Windham/Tolland	Windham/Coventry	US 6 (Willimantic Bypass)
Tolland	Mansfield/Coventry	Flanders Road
Tolland	Mansfield/Coventry	Route 31
Tolland	Mansfield/Coventry	New England Central Railroad
Tolland	Mansfield/Coventry	Depot Road
Tolland	Mansfield/Coventry	New England Central Railroad
Tolland	Mansfield/Coventry	Route 275
Tolland	Mansfield/Coventry	Plains Road
Tolland	Mansfield/Coventry	Merrow Road
Tolland	Mansfield/Tolland	Route 195
Tolland	Willington/ Tolland	New England Central Railroad
Tolland	Willington/ Tolland	South River Road/Depot Road
Tolland	Willington/ Tolland	Route 74
Tolland	Willington/ Tolland	I-84
Tolland	Willington/ Tolland	New England Central Railroad
Tolland	Willington/ Tolland	Route 32
Tolland	Ellington/Willington	New England Central Railroad
Tolland	Stafford	Private Drive

== See also ==
- List of Connecticut rivers
