= John Manning Hall =

American lawyer and politician

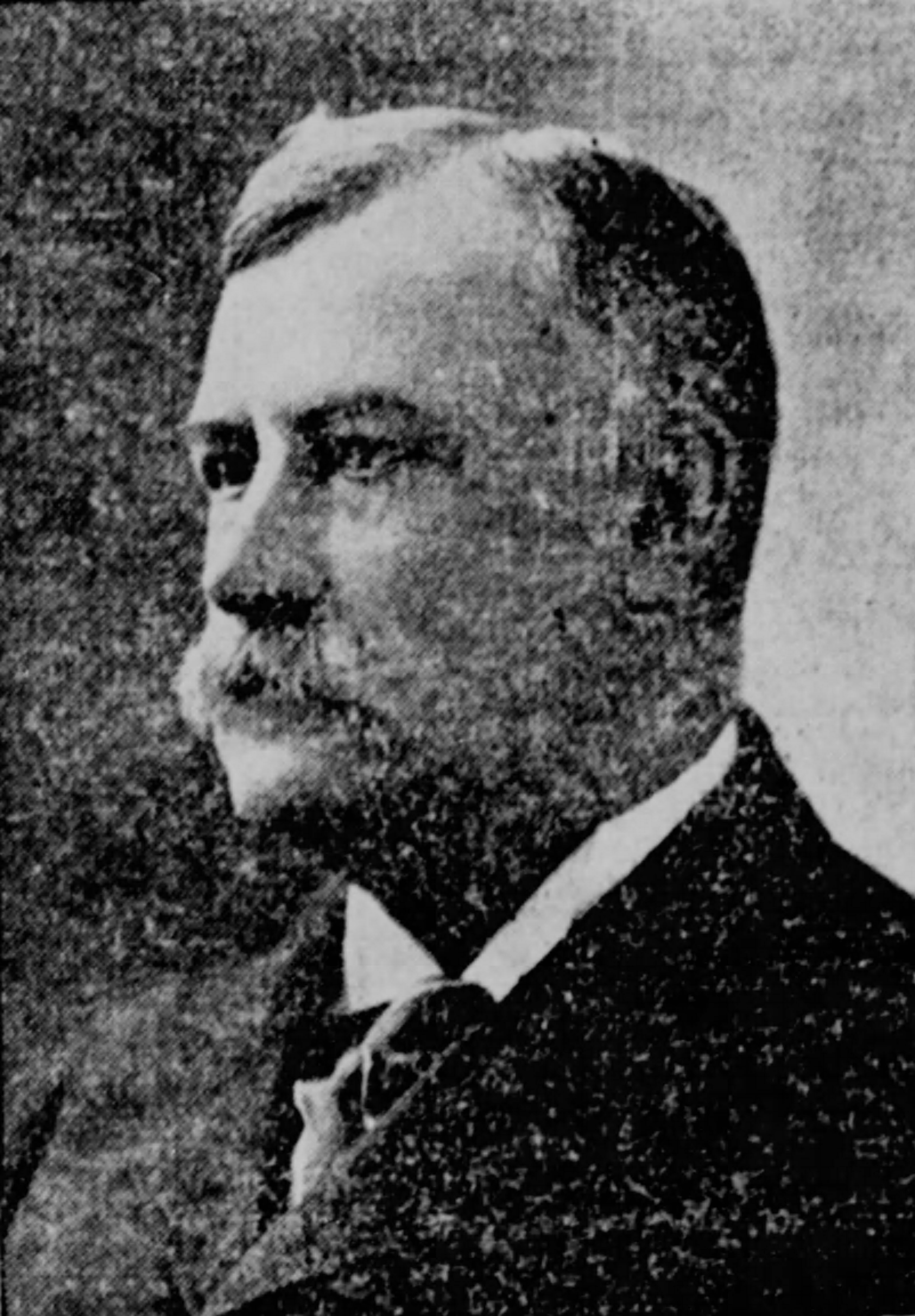
- Born: October 16, 1841; Willimantic, Connecticut, US
- Died: January 27, 1905 (aged 63); New Haven, Connecticut, US
- Education: Columbia Law School (JD); Yale University (BA)
- Occupations: Lawyer, politician, judge, and railroad executive
- Political party: Republican Party

John Manning Hall (October 16, 1841 – January 27, 1905) was an American lawyer, politician, judge, and railroad executive from Connecticut. His son, John L. Hall, co-founded the law firm Choate, Hall & Stewart.

== Biography ==
Hall was born in Willimantic, Connecticut, on October 16, 1841. His father was Horace Hall, a prominent local businessman who served as selectman, justice of the peace, and state representative for Willimantic. John's mother was Elizabeth Manning of Albany, New York. He graduated from Williston Seminary before earning his bachelor's degree from Yale University in 1866 and his J.D. degree from Columbia Law School in 1868.

Hall was Windham County's star lawyer in the 1870s and 1880s, gaining wealth and repute and even arguing a case before the US Supreme Court. After several terms in the Connecticut House of Representatives, during which he chaired the judiciary and railroad committees, he served as speaker of the House in 1882, president pro tempore of the Connecticut State Senate in 1889, and a judge of the Connecticut Superior Court from 1889 to 1893. He served on the inaugural board of trustees of the Storrs Agricultural School from 1881 to 1882.

Switching full-time to the private sector, Hall served as vice president (1893–99) and president (1899–1903) of the New York, New Haven and Hartford Railroad Company. After retiring as president, he continued to serve as the company's general counsel until his death in New Haven in 1905. His wife and children survived him.

In 1871, Hall had married Julia White Loomer, daughter of the president of the Willimantic Savings Institute. They had three children: John Loomer, Florence M., and Helen B. John L. Hall took after his father, graduating from Yale with honors and pursuing a successful law career. He co-founded the prominent Boston-based law firm Choate, Hall & Stewart in 1899. Both father and son belonged to Yale's Skull and Bones Society.
