= Willimantic, Connecticut =

- Census-designated place
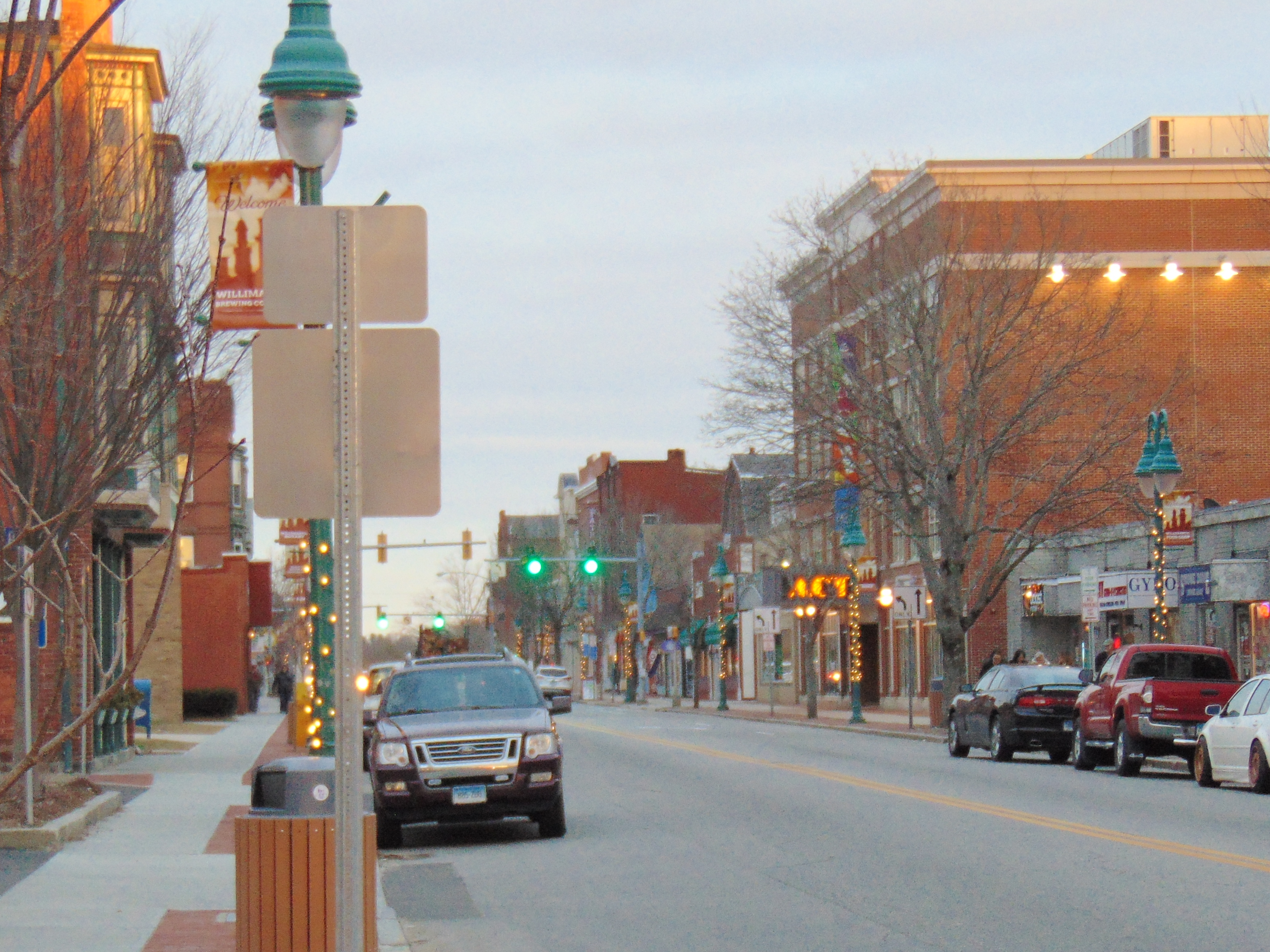
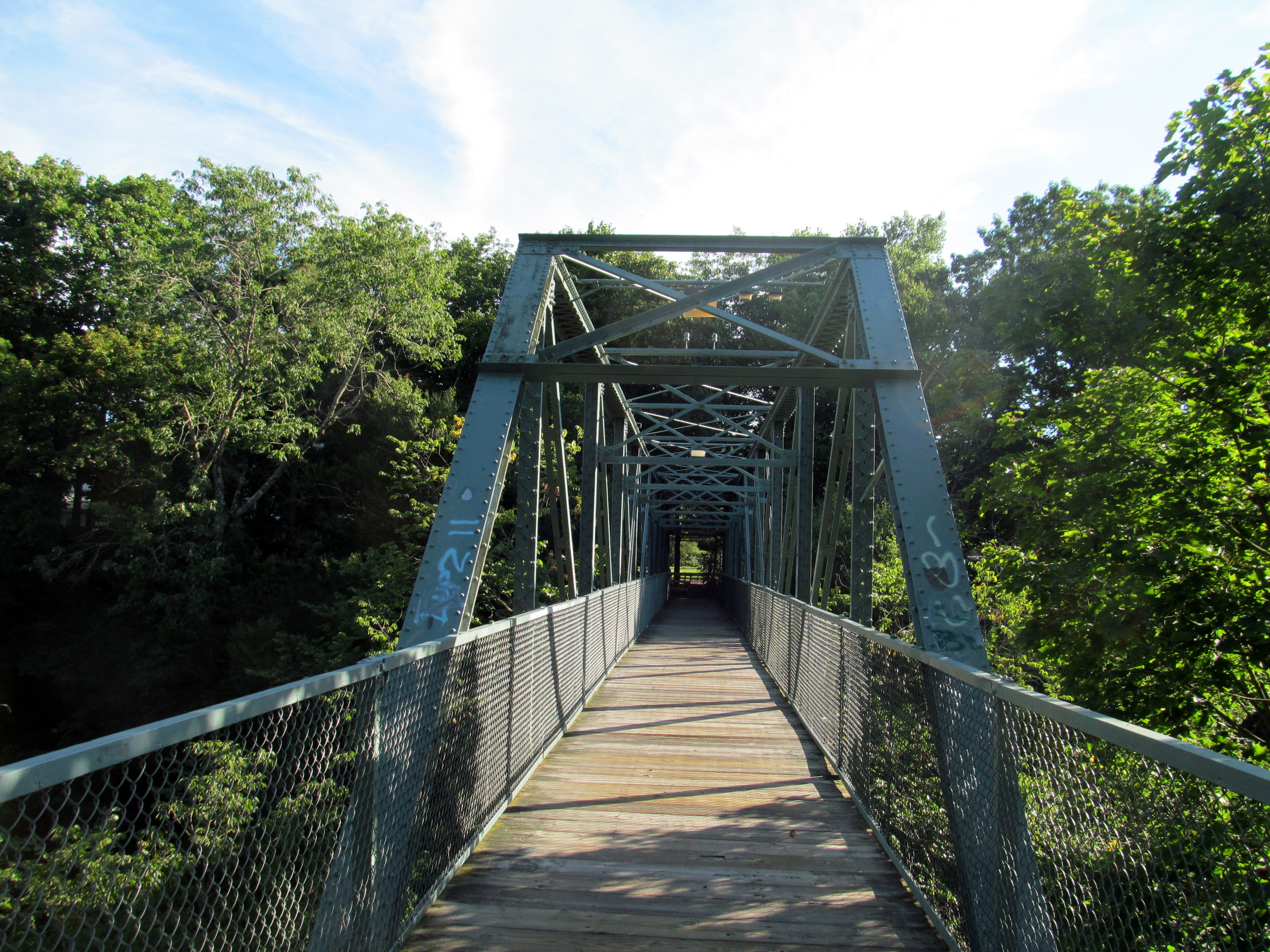
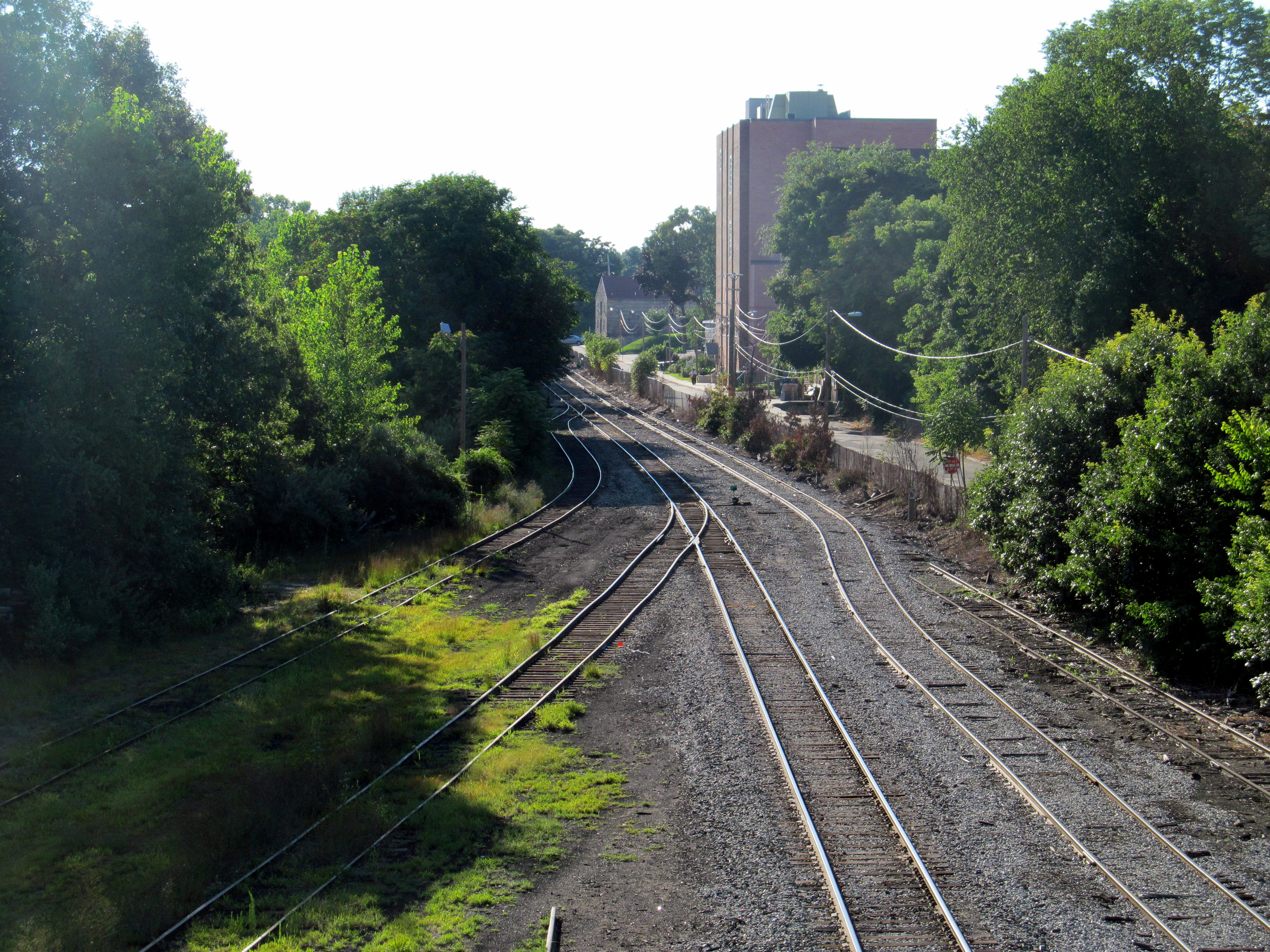
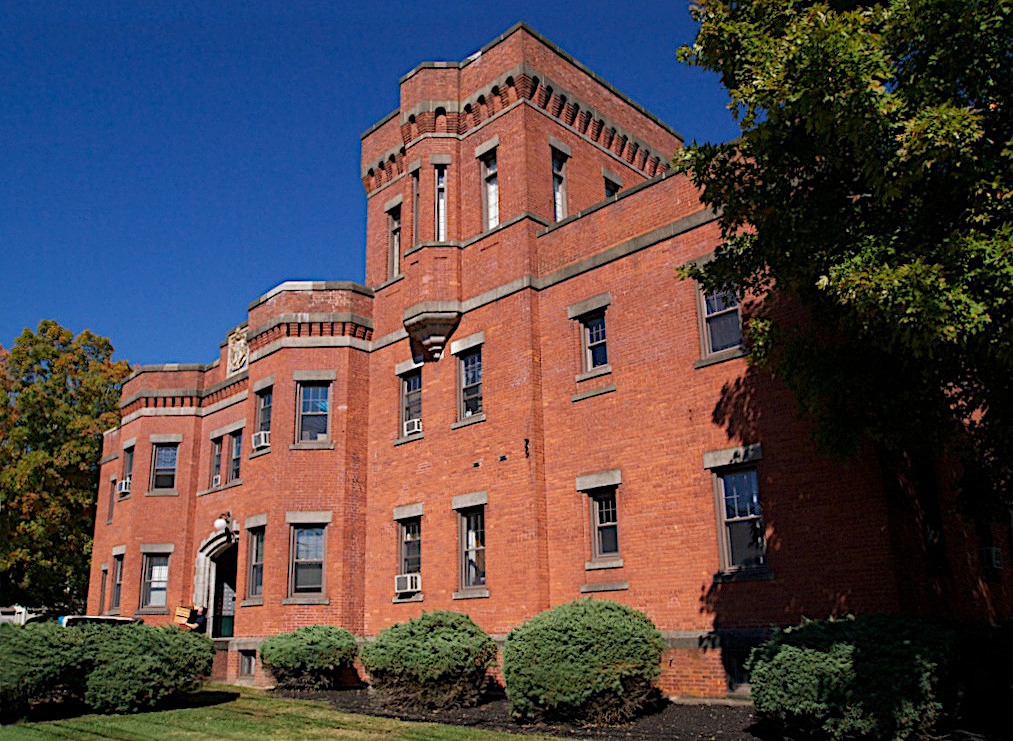
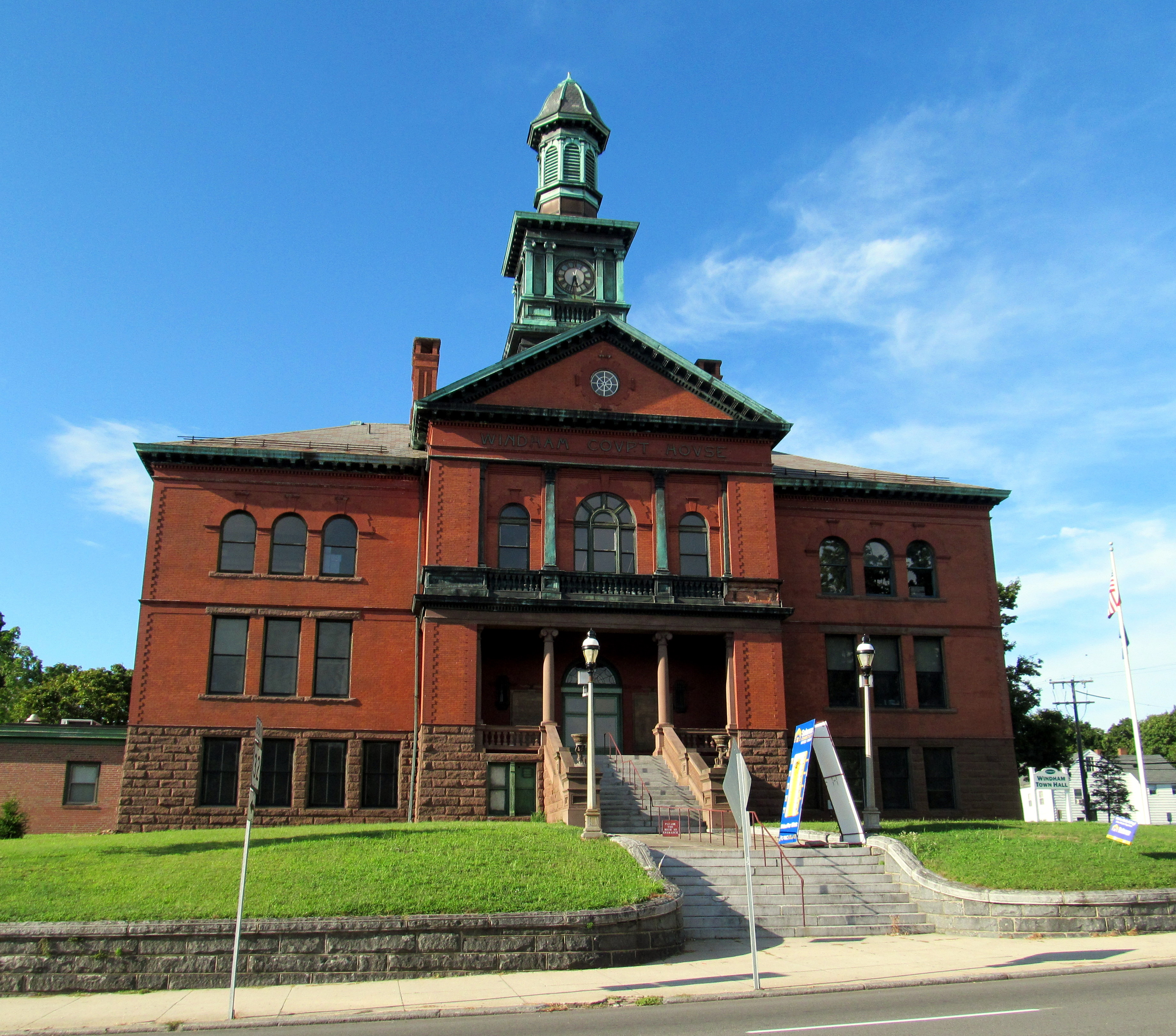
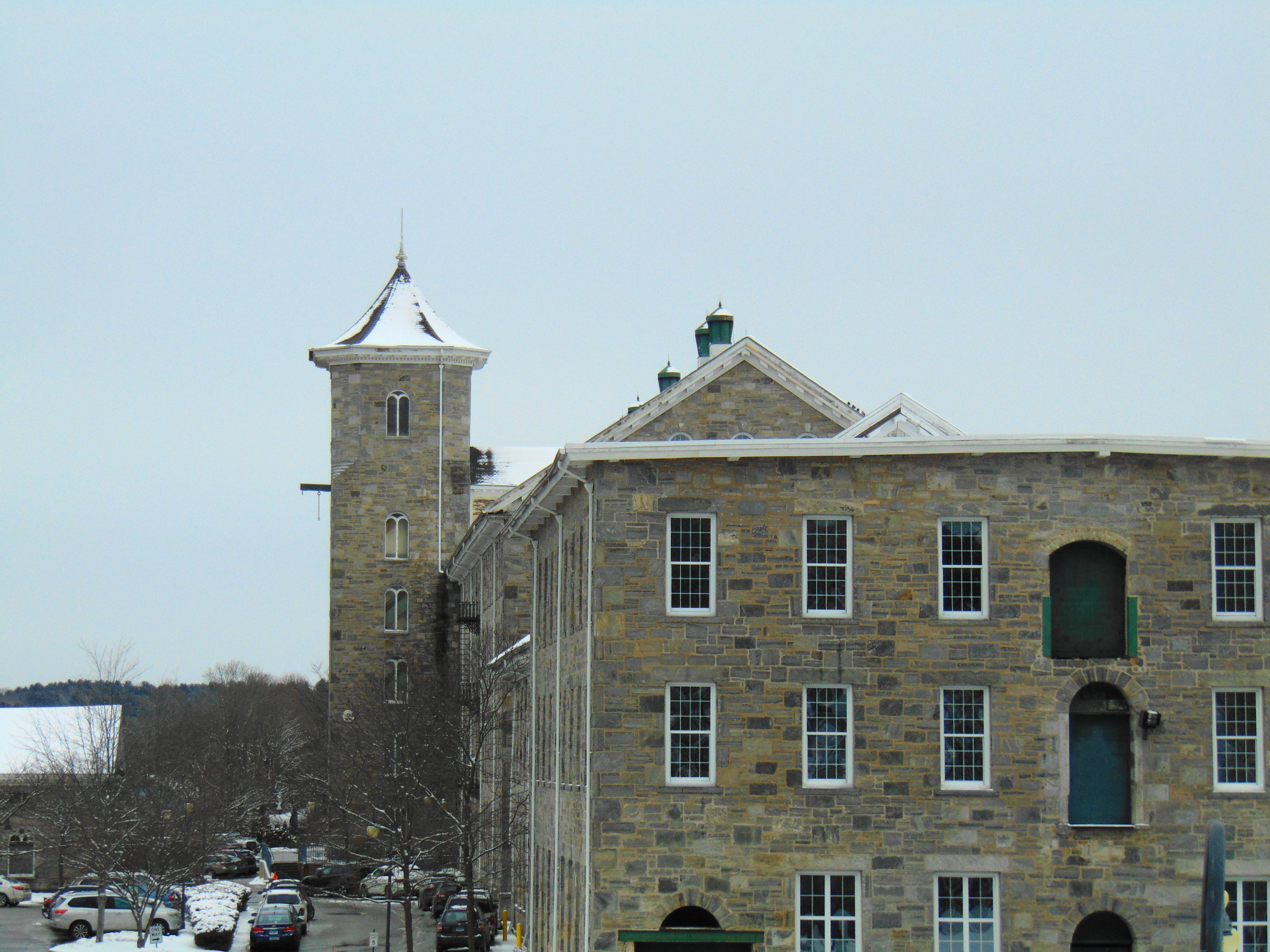
- From top to bottom, left to right: The view of the center of Willimantic from Route 66, the Willimantic Footbridge, a well known bridge, a railroad yard, the Willimantic Armory, the Windham Town Hall, and the American Thread Company's former mill

- Seal
- Nicknames: Thread City, Frog City, Romantic Willimantic
- Coordinates: 41°43′N 72°13′W
- Country: United States
- U.S. state: Connecticut
- County: Windham
- Region: Southeastern CT
- Named for: Willimantic River

Government
  - Mayor: Thomas DeVivo (D)
  - Town Manager: James Rivers

Area
  - Census-designated place: 4.5 sq mi (11.6 km^{2})
  - Land: 4.4 sq mi (11.4 km^{2})
  - Water: 0.12 sq mi (0.3 km^{2})

Population (2020)
  - Census-designated place: 18,149
  - Estimate (2021): 18,150
  - Density: 4,120/sq mi (1,592/km^{2})
  - Urban: 29,669
- Time zone: UTC-5 (Eastern)
  - Summer (DST): UTC-4 (Eastern)
- ZIP Code: 06226
- Area codes: 860/959
- Airport: Windham Airport
- Website: Official website

Willimantic is a census-designated place located in Windham, Connecticut, United States. Previously organized as a city and later as a borough, Willimantic is currently one of two tax districts within the Town of Windham. Willimantic is located within Windham County and the Southeastern Connecticut Planning Region. Known as "Thread City" for the American Thread Company's mills along the Willimantic River, it was a center of the textile industry in the 19th century. Originally incorporated as a city in 1893, it entered a period of decline after the Second World War, culminating in the mill's closure and the city's reabsorption into the town of Windham in the 1980s.

Willimantic was populated by a series of ethnic groups migrating to the city to find work at the mills, originally Western European and French Canadian immigrants, later Eastern Europeans and Puerto Ricans. Architecturally, it is known for its collection of Victorian-era houses and other buildings in the hill section, the Romanesque Revival town hall and several crossings of the Willimantic River, including the Willimantic Footbridge and the "Frog Bridge". It is home to Eastern Connecticut State University and the Windham Textile and History Museum. As of 2020, Willimantic had a population of 18,149 people.

== History ==
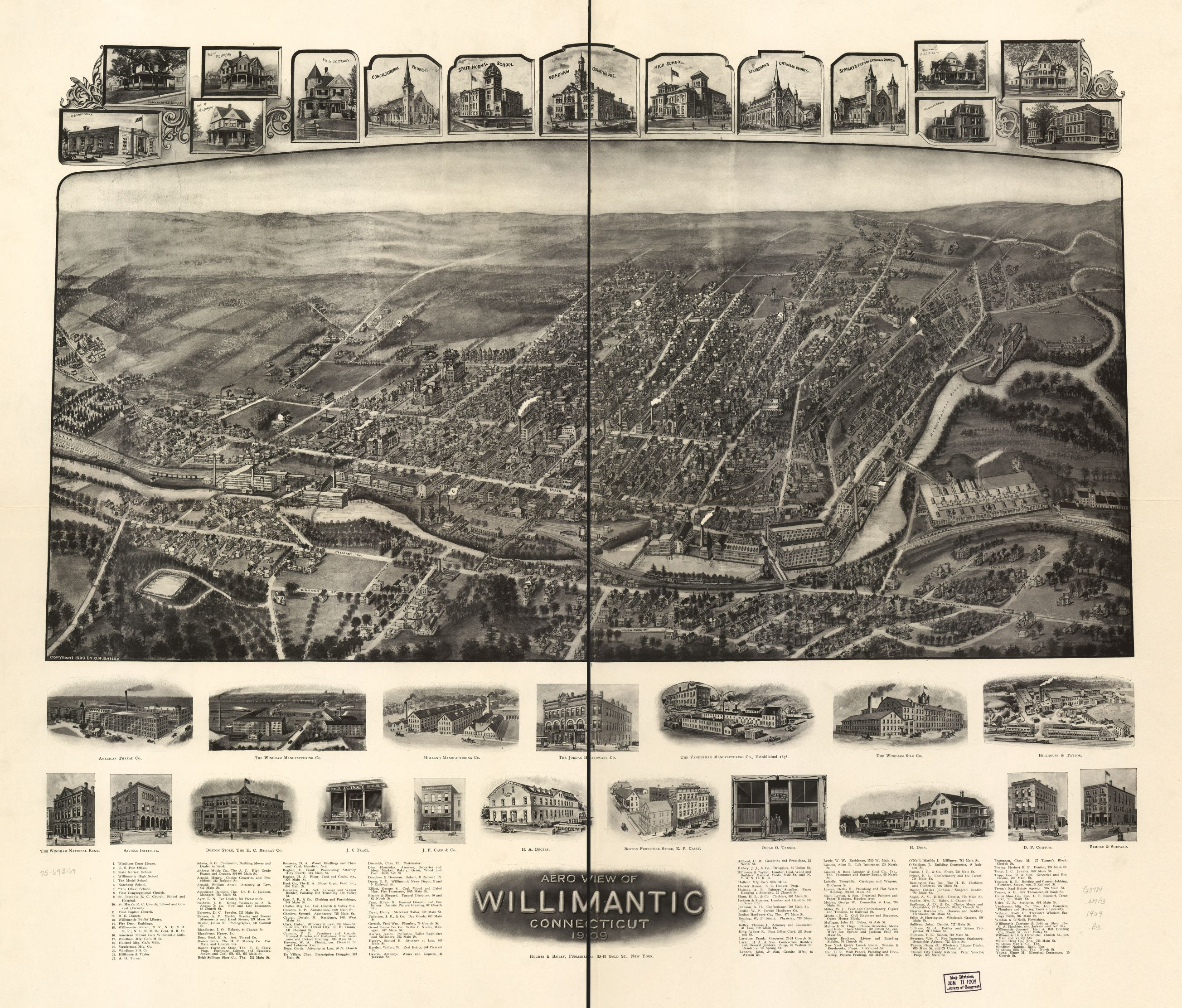
Aerial view of Willimantic, 1909

=== Early history ===
Willimantic is named for the Willimantic River which passes through it. The word was first attested in English writing as Waramanticut in 1684, and later as Wallamanticuk, Wewemantic and Weammantuck before being standardized as Willimantic. The word is of Algonquian origin, either Mohegan-Pequot or Narragansett. It is commonly translated as 'land of the swift running water', but the word more likely means 'place near the evergreen swamp'. The town of Willimantic, Maine, is named after Willimantic, Connecticut.

The surrounding town of Windham was founded in 1693 on land bequeathed by the Mohegan people. The first settler in what is now Willimantic was Samuel Ashley, who bought property there in 1717. Until it was industrialized, the area was called "Willimantic Falls". The first mill to be established was a picking and carding facility for wool, in 1806. Other mills followed, most notably a series of thread mills starting in 1822.

=== As an incorporated city (1833–1983) ===
As the city grew, it was incorporated as a borough in 1833. Willimantic became known as "Thread City" for the proliferation of textile mills, primarily thread, along the river.

Willimantic became a city when its charter was revised in 1893. Up to the outbreak of World War II, it continued to be a center for the production of silk and cotton thread. Various groups of immigrants arrived over the years to work in the mills. The city was a major rail hub; in the early twentieth century, as many as a hundred trains ran through Willimantic daily. Ornate Victorian homes were built in the town's Prospect Hill section, and the town prospered, growing from a population of less than 5,000 in 1860 to more than 12,100 by 1910.

But hard times followed; American Thread moved to North Carolina in 1985 and without it, the town's economy foundered. The city consolidated back into the town in 1983.

=== As part of Windham (1983–present) ===
Heroin use, present since the 1960s, became a major public health problem in the early 2000s, declining somewhat by the 2010s. In 2002, The Hartford Courant ran an investigative series called "Heroin Town" describing rampant heroin use in Willimantic, disproportionate to the town's small size, which was followed by a 60 Minutes segment in 2003. The coverage upset local residents, and the state appointed a task force to study the issue. The Hotel Hooker, long known for drug use and prostitution, was renamed to the Seth Chauncey Hotel and put under new management in 2004, then renamed Windham House in 2005. Drug and prostitution arrests peaked in the late 2000s with increased enforcement, and began to fall by 2010. The poverty rate, at 25.9%, was more than double the state average in 2010.

== Geography ==
According to the United States Census Bureau, the census-designated place (CDP) has a total area of 4.5 square miles (12 km^{2}), of which 4.4 square miles (11 km^{2}) is land and 0.1 square miles (0.26 km^{2}) (2.23%) is water. The Willimantic River and the Natchaug River converge to form the Shetucket River in southeastern Willimantic. The Hop River also flows into the Willimantic River at the western border.

Willimantic is, in part, bordered by rivers. Its western border follows the Willimantic River; its eastern border is formed by the Natchaug and Shetucket Rivers. The CDP borders the towns of Coventry, Mansfield, Columbia, and Lebanon. It also borders the CDPs of South Windham (which is in the same town as Willimantic) and Mansfield Center.

=== Climate ===
Climate data for Windham County, Connecticut (including University of Connecticut and Storrs, Connecticut), 1991–2020 normals, extremes 1888–present
| Month | Jan | Feb | Mar | Apr | May | Jun | Jul | Aug | Sep | Oct | Nov | Dec | Year |
|---|---|---|---|---|---|---|---|---|---|---|---|---|---|
| Record high °F (°C) | 68 (20) | 69 (21) | 83 (28) | 95 (35) | 93 (34) | 96 (36) | 101 (38) | 97 (36) | 97 (36) | 89 (32) | 82 (28) | 73 (23) | 101 (38) |
| Mean maximum °F (°C) | 56.4 (13.6) | 55.2 (12.9) | 64.1 (17.8) | 77.7 (25.4) | 84.1 (28.9) | 87.3 (30.7) | 89.8 (32.1) | 87.8 (31.0) | 84.0 (28.9) | 76.1 (24.5) | 68.2 (20.1) | 59.8 (15.4) | 91.6 (33.1) |
| Mean daily maximum °F (°C) | 35.0 (1.7) | 37.2 (2.9) | 44.8 (7.1) | 57.0 (13.9) | 67.6 (19.8) | 75.6 (24.2) | 80.5 (26.9) | 79.1 (26.2) | 72.7 (22.6) | 61.3 (16.3) | 50.3 (10.2) | 40.1 (4.5) | 58.4 (14.7) |
| Daily mean °F (°C) | 26.9 (−2.8) | 28.8 (−1.8) | 36.3 (2.4) | 47.5 (8.6) | 57.7 (14.3) | 66.3 (19.1) | 71.7 (22.1) | 70.0 (21.1) | 63.4 (17.4) | 52.1 (11.2) | 42.1 (5.6) | 32.7 (0.4) | 49.6 (9.8) |
| Mean daily minimum °F (°C) | 18.8 (−7.3) | 20.4 (−6.4) | 27.8 (−2.3) | 38.0 (3.3) | 47.7 (8.7) | 57.0 (13.9) | 62.8 (17.1) | 60.9 (16.1) | 54.1 (12.3) | 42.9 (6.1) | 34.0 (1.1) | 25.3 (−3.7) | 40.8 (4.9) |
| Mean minimum °F (°C) | −0.2 (−17.9) | 3.2 (−16.0) | 11.1 (−11.6) | 26.6 (−3.0) | 36.4 (2.4) | 44.9 (7.2) | 53.3 (11.8) | 51.2 (10.7) | 40.3 (4.6) | 29.7 (−1.3) | 20.0 (−6.7) | 9.9 (−12.3) | −2.1 (−18.9) |
| Record low °F (°C) | −19 (−28) | −20 (−29) | −6 (−21) | 10 (−12) | 25 (−4) | 35 (2) | 42 (6) | 37 (3) | 26 (−3) | 16 (−9) | 1 (−17) | −17 (−27) | −20 (−29) |
| Average precipitation inches (mm) | 3.65 (93) | 2.99 (76) | 4.38 (111) | 4.23 (107) | 3.73 (95) | 4.52 (115) | 4.01 (102) | 4.30 (109) | 4.48 (114) | 4.58 (116) | 3.90 (99) | 4.50 (114) | 49.27 (1,251) |
| Average snowfall inches (cm) | 8.3 (21) | 14.1 (36) | 6.3 (16) | 1.7 (4.3) | 0.0 (0.0) | 0.0 (0.0) | 0.0 (0.0) | 0.0 (0.0) | 0.0 (0.0) | 0.3 (0.76) | 1.1 (2.8) | 7.2 (18) | 39.0 (99) |
| Average precipitation days (≥ 0.01 in) | 10.2 | 9.0 | 10.2 | 11.3 | 12.7 | 10.9 | 10.5 | 9.5 | 9.0 | 10.6 | 9.1 | 10.4 | 123.4 |
| Average snowy days (≥ 0.1 in) | 3.8 | 4.0 | 2.5 | 0.6 | 0.0 | 0.0 | 0.0 | 0.0 | 0.0 | 0.1 | 0.4 | 2.1 | 13.5 |
Source 1: NOAA
Source 2: National Weather Service

== Demographics ==
Historical population
| Census | Pop. | Note | %± |
|---|---|---|---|
| 1880 | 6,608 | | — |
| 1890 | 8,648 | | 30.9% |
| 1900 | 8,937 | | 3.3% |
| 1910 | 11,230 | | 25.7% |
| 1920 | 12,330 | | 9.8% |
| 1930 | 12,102 | | −1.8% |
| 1940 | 12,101 | | 0.0% |
| 1950 | 13,586 | | 12.3% |
| 1960 | 13,881 | | 2.2% |
| 1970 | 14,402 | | 3.8% |
| 1980 | 14,652 | | 1.7% |
| 1990 | 14,746 | | 0.6% |
| 2000 | 15,823 | | 7.3% |
| 2010 | 17,737 | | 12.1% |
| 2020 | 18,149 | | 2.3% |
U.S. Decennial Census / Social Explorer Map

Immigrants of many national origins populated the city. First, Europeans arrived to work in the mills—Irish, Italians, Poles, Germans and French Canadians. Later, Estonian, Ukrainian, Latvian, Lithuanian, and Puerto Rican immigrants moved to the town in search of mill jobs. As a mark of how strongly newcomers identified with their places of origin, Willimantic has many churches, even several from the same denomination: for example, one Catholic church for French Canadians, another for Irish, Polish and Italian immigrants.

=== 2020 census ===
As of the 2020 census, Willimantic had a population of 18,149. The median age was 29.0 years. 20.8% of residents were under the age of 18 and 10.8% of residents were 65 years of age or older. For every 100 females there were 93.1 males, and for every 100 females age 18 and over there were 90.6 males age 18 and over.

99.8% of residents lived in urban areas, while 0.2% lived in rural areas.

There were 6,352 households in Willimantic, of which 31.6% had children under the age of 18 living in them. Of all households, 25.0% were married-couple households, 25.8% were households with a male householder and no spouse or partner present, and 39.3% were households with a female householder and no spouse or partner present. About 33.8% of all households were made up of individuals and 11.7% had someone living alone who was 65 years of age or older.

There were 6,891 housing units, of which 7.8% were vacant. The homeowner vacancy rate was 1.3% and the rental vacancy rate was 5.2%.

Racial composition as of the 2020 census
| Race | Number | Percent |
|---|---|---|
| White | 8,717 | 48.0% |
| Black or African American | 984 | 5.4% |
| American Indian and Alaska Native | 443 | 2.4% |
| Asian | 759 | 4.2% |
| Native Hawaiian and Other Pacific Islander | 4 | 0.0% |
| Some other race | 4,579 | 25.2% |
| Two or more races | 2,663 | 14.7% |
| Hispanic or Latino (of any race) | 9,049 | 49.9% |

=== 2010 census ===
As of the 2010 US Census, there were 17,737 people, 5,812 households, and 3,324 families residing in the CDP. The population density was 4,031 inhabitants per square mile (1,556/km^{2}). There were 6,282 housing units at an average density of 1,428 per square mile (551/km^{2}).

The racial makeup of the CDP was 66.0% White, 7.5% African American, 0.6% Native American, 1.9% Asian, 0.1% Pacific Islander, 20.2% from other races, and 3.8% from two or more races. Hispanic or Latino of any race were 39.8% of the population, of whom the majority are (26.4%) Puerto Rican.

Of the 5,812 households, just over one third (34.2%) included children under the age of 18, 30.6% were married couples living together, 20.2% had a female householder with no spouse present, and 42.8% were non-families. About 31.0% of all households were made up of individuals, and 10.9% of households were one individual aged 65 or older. The average household size was 2.58 and the average family size was 3.21.

In the CDP the population's age distribution was 21.5% under age 18, 31.0% from 18 to 24, 24.8% from 25 to 44, 19.0% from 45 to 64, and 8.6% who were 65 years of age or older. The median age was 26.5 years. For every 100 females, there were 97.3 males. For every 100 women ages 18 and over, there were 95.8 men.

The median income for a household in the CDP was $37,469, and the median income for a family was $45,254. Males had a median income of $37,111 versus $33,862 for females. The per capita income for the CDP was $18,441. About 23.7% of families and 25.9% of the population were below the poverty line, including 38.4% of those under age 18 and 9.3% of those age 65 or over.

The Willimantic urban cluster is an area surrounding the CDP, which has a population of 29,669 as of the 2010 census.

== Economy ==
Willimantic's first factory was built in 1822 on Main Street by Charles Lee, followed by the first of the Jillson Mills in 1824. The Jillson Mills were bought in 1854 by a group of investors from Hartford, who formed the Willimantic Linen Company. In 1879, the Company built a woodworking factory to source its spools in Howard, Maine, which was renamed Willimantic in 1881. In 1880, the Willimantic Linen Company built its Mill No. 4, the first industrial building designed for electric lighting and the world's largest cotton mill at the time, which stood until it was burned down by two teenagers in 1995. The company was acquired by American Thread Company in 1898, and expanded production. The mill closed when the company moved operations to North Carolina in 1985.

Major employers include Willimantic Waste Paper Company, which specializes in the collection and recycling of fiber products, scrap metal, and co-mingled plastic refuse, as well as Brand-Rex Corporation, which maintains a manufacturing making specialty wire and cable for commercial and industrial customers. In January 2018, a fire destroyed the Willimantic Waste Paper processing plant, however it was rebuilt and is currently operating. On July 26, 2021, Casella Waste Systems purchased Willimantic Waste Paper Company.

== Points of interest ==
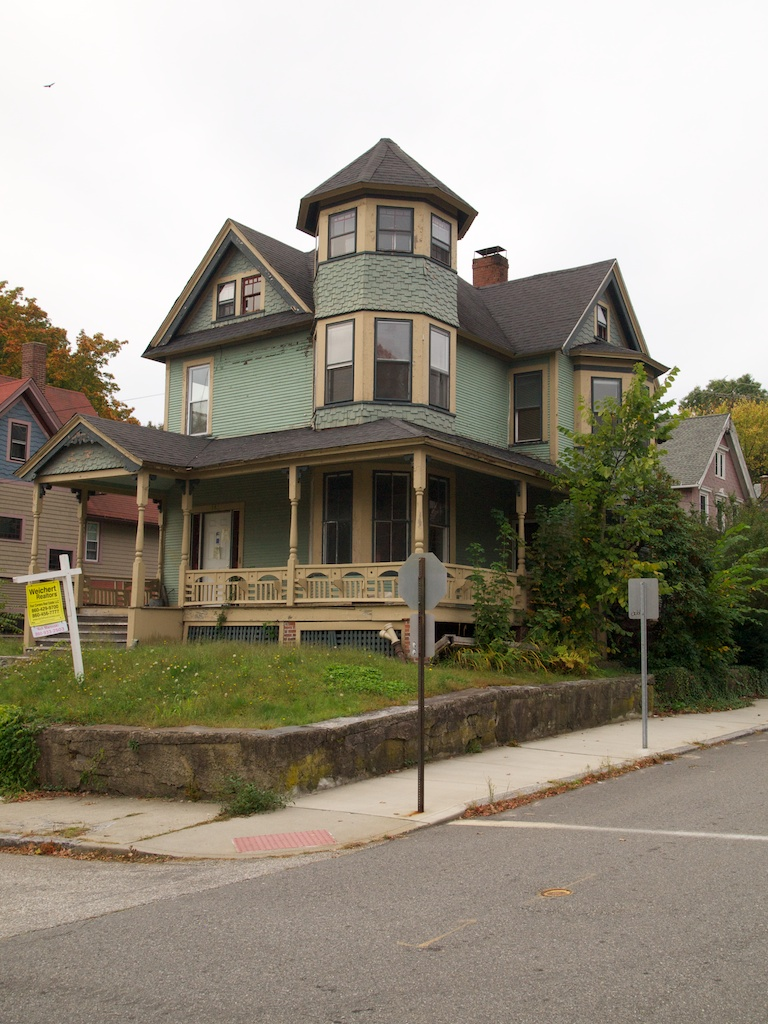
A Victorian-era house in the Prospect Hill Historic District

Willimantic is home to a wealth of Victorian-era architecture. Prospect Hill Historic District is a National Register-listed historic district containing 993 buildings. Windham Town Hall, formerly Willimantic City Hall, is a Romanesque Revival building housing the town offices for Windham and Willimantic.

The Windham Textile and History Museum preserves and presents the history of the neighboring Jillson Mills and the rest of Willimantic during the Industrial Revolution. The Connecticut Eastern Railroad Museum, located where the Columbia Junction Freight Yard was, has a collection of locomotives and rolling stock, as well as a reconstructed six-stall roundhouse.

Willimantic is the home of the Willimantic Footbridge. Built in 1907, it is the only footbridge in the United States to connect two state highways, as well as crossing all three major forms of transportation: road, rail, and river. The Thread City Crossing ("Frog Bridge") is a road bridge over the Willimantic River, opened to traffic in September 2000, featuring eight-foot high, green-painted bronze frogs sitting on concrete thread spools to represent Willimantic's history in textiles as well as the local legend of the Windham Frog Fight of 1754.

== Culture ==
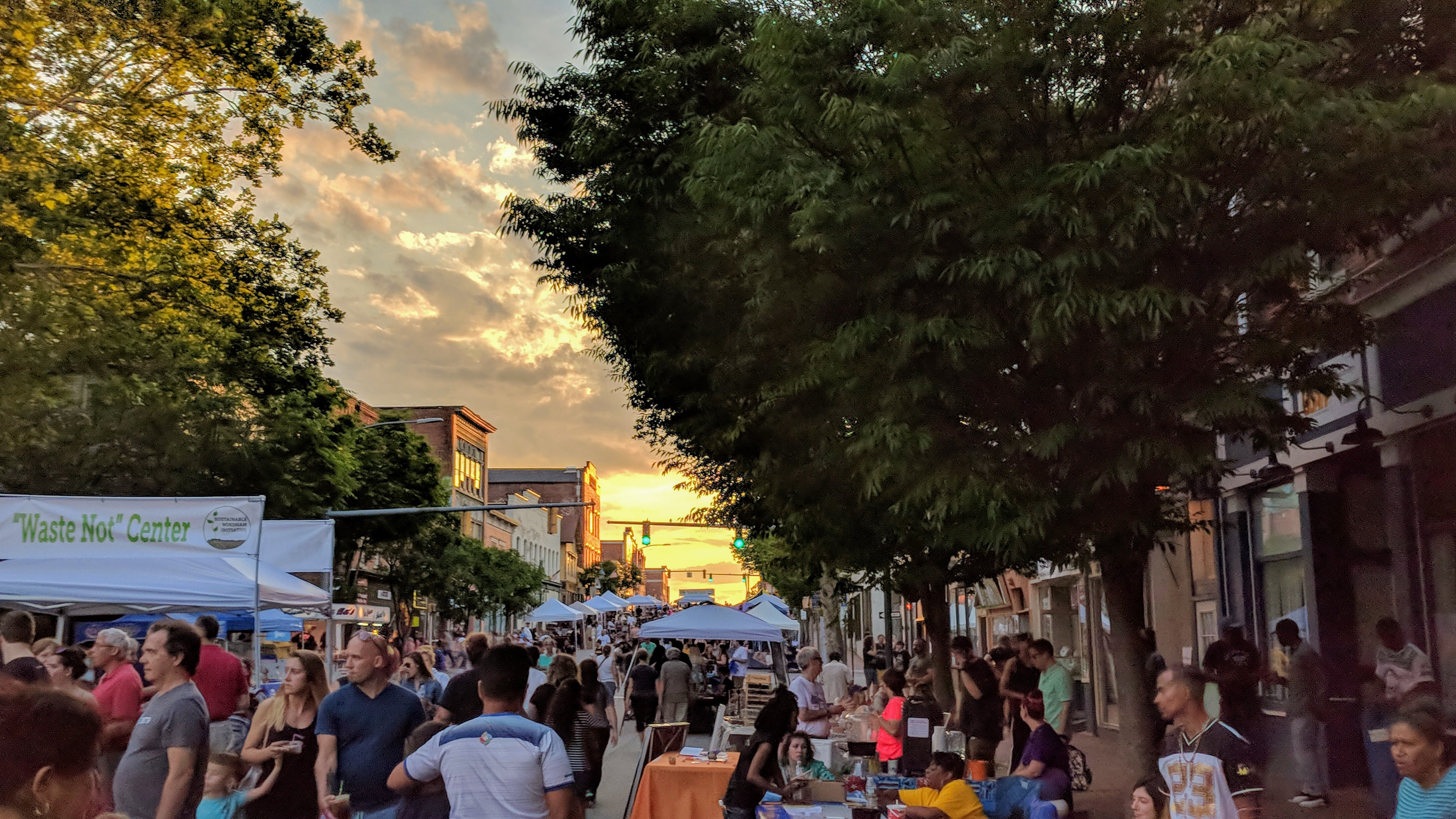
The Third Thursday Street Fest in June 2018

Willimantic holds a Boom Box Parade every 4 July where, instead of a marching band performing, residents bring boom boxes tuned to WILI, the local AM radio station. The tradition started on Memorial Day of 1986, when no marching band was available for a parade. The parade has received national attention from the Washington Post. For Valentine's Day, it runs a chocolate festival, including a baking contest. The event started with a popular set of T-shirts first printed in 1980, which led to the first crowning of a "Town Cupid" in 1982, now an annual event.

Once a year, the Willimantic Victorian Neighborhood Association offers tours of homes in the Prospect Hill Historic District as part of a "Victorian Days" event.

Starting in 2002, on the third Thursday of each month from May to September, the town holds the Third Thursday Street Fest on Main Street, an arts festival with live music and street vendors. The event is run by Willimantic Renaissance, a local nonprofit organization, and draws about eight thousand attendees.

== Education ==
Willimantic is served by Windham Public Schools, which administers public schools in Willimantic as well as in the rest of Windham. Willimantic itself has a public preschool, the Windham Early Childhood Center, as well as Sweeney Elementary and Natchaug School for primary education, Windham Middle School for middle-school education, and Windham High School for high-school students. Middle-school students can also apply for admission by lottery to the Charles H. Barrows STEM Academy in Windham.

Additionally, Willimantic contains the Arts at the Capitol Theater Performing Arts High School, administered by EASTCONN, and Windham Technical High School, part of the Connecticut Technical High School System. There is also a private Christian school, St. Mary-St. Joseph School, serving Pre-K through eighth grade.

Eastern Connecticut State University, a four-year liberal arts college, is located in Willimantic, as is a satellite campus of Quinebaug Valley Community College.

== Government ==
Before it was re-incorporated into Windham, Willimantic had a series of mayors; the Town of Windham was administered by a board of selectmen until 2009, when it changed to use a town council/town manager system with an elected mayor. As part of Windham, it is part of Connecticut's 2nd congressional district; in the Connecticut Senate, the 29th district, and in the Connecticut House of Representatives, most of it is in the 49th district, with some western parts in the 48th district.

Willimantic was the county seat of Windham County from 1893 to 1960, when the county system was abolished. The Windham Judicial District building is in downtown Willimantic as well.

== Infrastructure ==
=== Transportation ===
Willimantic is served by several state routes: Route 14, Route 32, Route 66, Route 195, and Route 289. It is additionally served by the Willimantic Bypass (US 6), a controlled-access highway. Notably, the only connections to the outside world are via surface roads, as the Willimantic Bypass is only divided between its two intersections with Route 66. In the 1960s, Interstate 84 was intended to connect Willimantic to Hartford in the west and Providence in the east, but the plan was eventually abandoned. Though the city was a major rail hub, Interstate 84 only skirted the area between 1970 and 1983, until plans to continue the highway eastward were scrapped by 1984, after which time U.S. 6 was moved to the Willimatic Bypass.

Public transportation in Willimantic is provided by the Windham Region Transit District, which provides two in-town routes, and three intercity routes to Norwich, Danielson and Storrs. Historically, Willimantic was also served by intercity trolley service: from 1903 to 1936, a line ran southeast to Norwich, and from 1909 to 1926, another ran northwest to Coventry. Both lines ended at the downtown railroad yard, but did not physically connect, as they did not cross the tracks.

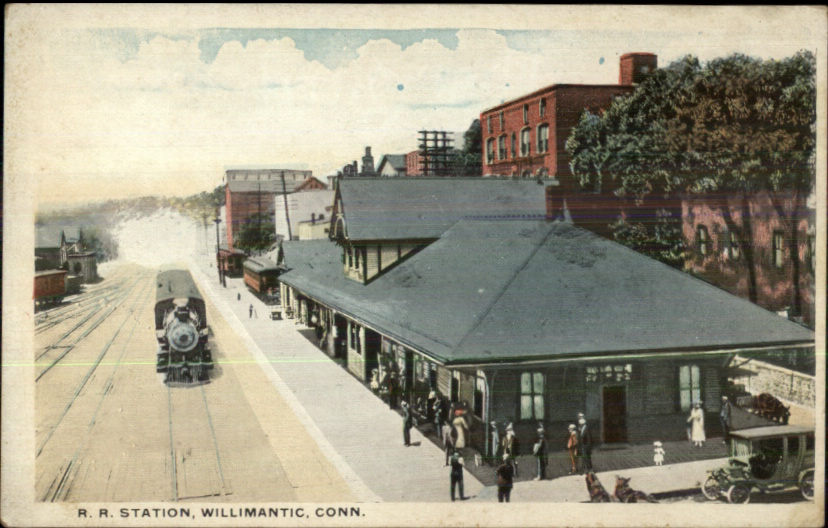
Willimantic station, in early 20th century, when the station was a busy junction.

In the 19th century, three active rail lines passed through Willimantic: the Central Vermont Railway in 1849, running from New London in the south northward to Vermont, the Hartford, Providence and Fishkill Railroad (later purchased by the New York, New Haven and Hartford Railroad) in 1849, running east-to-west, and finally a line of the New York and New England Railroad, running from Boston in the northeast towards New York via Middletown and New Haven in the southwest, in 1872, which also was acquired by the New York, New Haven and Hartford Railroad. Willimantic was one of only a handful of stops between Boston and New York on the high-speed "White Train" of the 1890s. At its peak, the passenger rail system ran forty trains a day through Willimantic. The NH operated the Nutmeg and several unnamed local trains on an east–west route from Waterbury, through Hartford and Willimantic, and on east to Boston. These rail services ended in 1955 after a bridge was flooded out by Hurricane Diane.

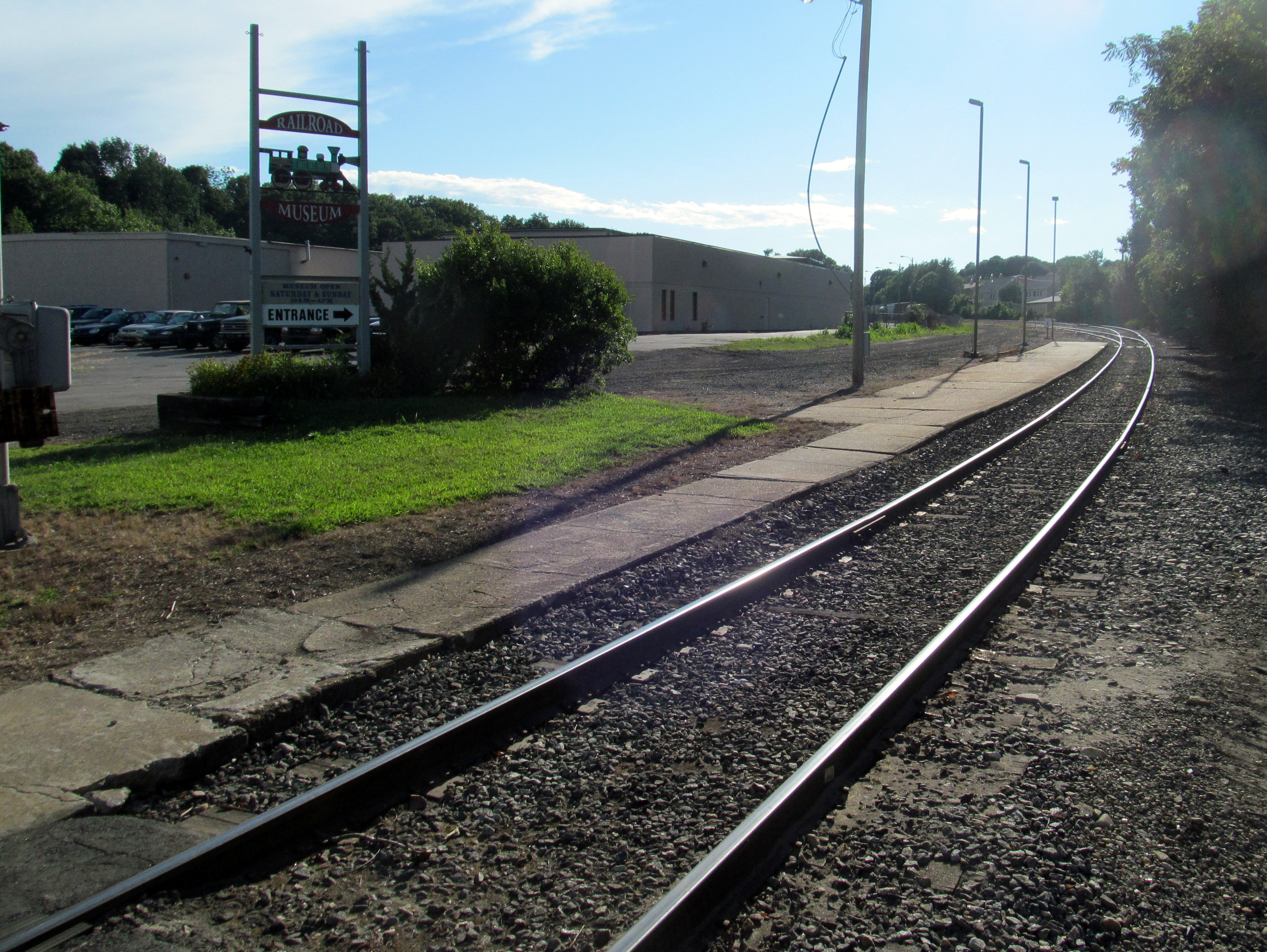
Former Amtrak platform for the Montrealer in downtown Willimantic.

Currently no active passenger rail service stops at Willimantic station, though formerly Amtrak's Montrealer stopped at the city from 1991 to 1995.

Windham Airport (IJD), a nearby general aviation airport, is the only airport that directly serves the CDP. Bradley International Airport (BDL) in Windsor Locks is the closest commercial airport.

The Airline Trail South crosses the Willimantic River to enter Willimantic on a 2016 built path that ends at Bridge Street The Airline Trail North starts on Jackson Street across the street from Jillson Park, the trail then goes through the northeastern part of Willimantic before crossing the Natchaug River to leave the CDP and heading on to Putnam. The Hop River Trail enters Willimantic on CT 66 (crossing over the Willimantic River) shortly before departing to follow the river to the Airline Trail, where it ends.

=== Utilities ===
Electricity and gas service is provided by Eversource. Municipal water and sewer services are provided by Windham Water Works.

=== Healthcare ===
Windham Hospital, a subsidiary of Hartford HealthCare, is a 130-bed community hospital serving the area. The Veterans Administration also runs an outpatient primary-care facility on Main Street. Generations Family Health Center, a Federally Qualified Health Center, is also located on Mansfield Avenue.

== Media ==
Willimantic is served by The Chronicle, a local paper founded in 1877 with continuous service since then, which also serves other towns in Eastern Connecticut.

Two commercial radio stations serve the Willimantic area: WILI AM 1400 (with a translator station to 95.3 FM), a news/talk/sports station, and its sister station WILI-FM 98.3, a top 40 station. Eastern Connecticut State University also broadcasts WECS, the local NPR affiliate, on FM 90.1.

== Notable people ==
- William Bonin, serial killer known as the Freeway Killer
- Apathy (birth name Chad Bromley), rapper
- Nora Dannehy, Connecticut Supreme Court justice
- Chris Dodd, senator
- Eileen Farrell, soprano opera and concert singer
- Jennifer Guthrie, actress
- John Manning Hall, lawyer and state legislator
- Skip Holtz, football coach
- Julian Jordan, composer
- Jules Jordan, composer
- James A. Kowalski, clergyman
- John T. Lis, professor of molecular biology and genetics
- John S. Marcy, member of the New York State Assembly
- Alfred Henry Noel, mayor from 1969 to 1971
- Fred Norris, radio personality
- Isaiah Oggins, American spy for the Soviet Union, GULAG prisoner, and victim of Stalinism
- Helen Turner Watson, one of the first African-American women to serve in the U.S Navy
- Ethel Paley, nursing home patient advocate

== In popular culture ==
Connecticut State Troubadour Hugh Blumenfeld wrote a "Willimantic Trilogy" of songs about the city from 1990 to 1995: "Thread City", "Main Street Sky", and "How Long".

In 2007, writer-director A.D. Calvo filmed portions of his debut film, The Other Side of the Tracks, in Willimantic, and in 2011, he returned to film the majority of his third feature, House of Dust, on the campus of Eastern Connecticut State University and various other locations in town.

In Marvel Comics "Avengers: Celestial Quest", Mantis recounts raising her son, Sequoia, in Willimantic for a year. One of her fragmented manifestations would later return and be found by a clone of Thanos.
