= Jillson Mills =

Mill complex in Connecticut, U.S.

Willimantic Linen Company Mill Complex no
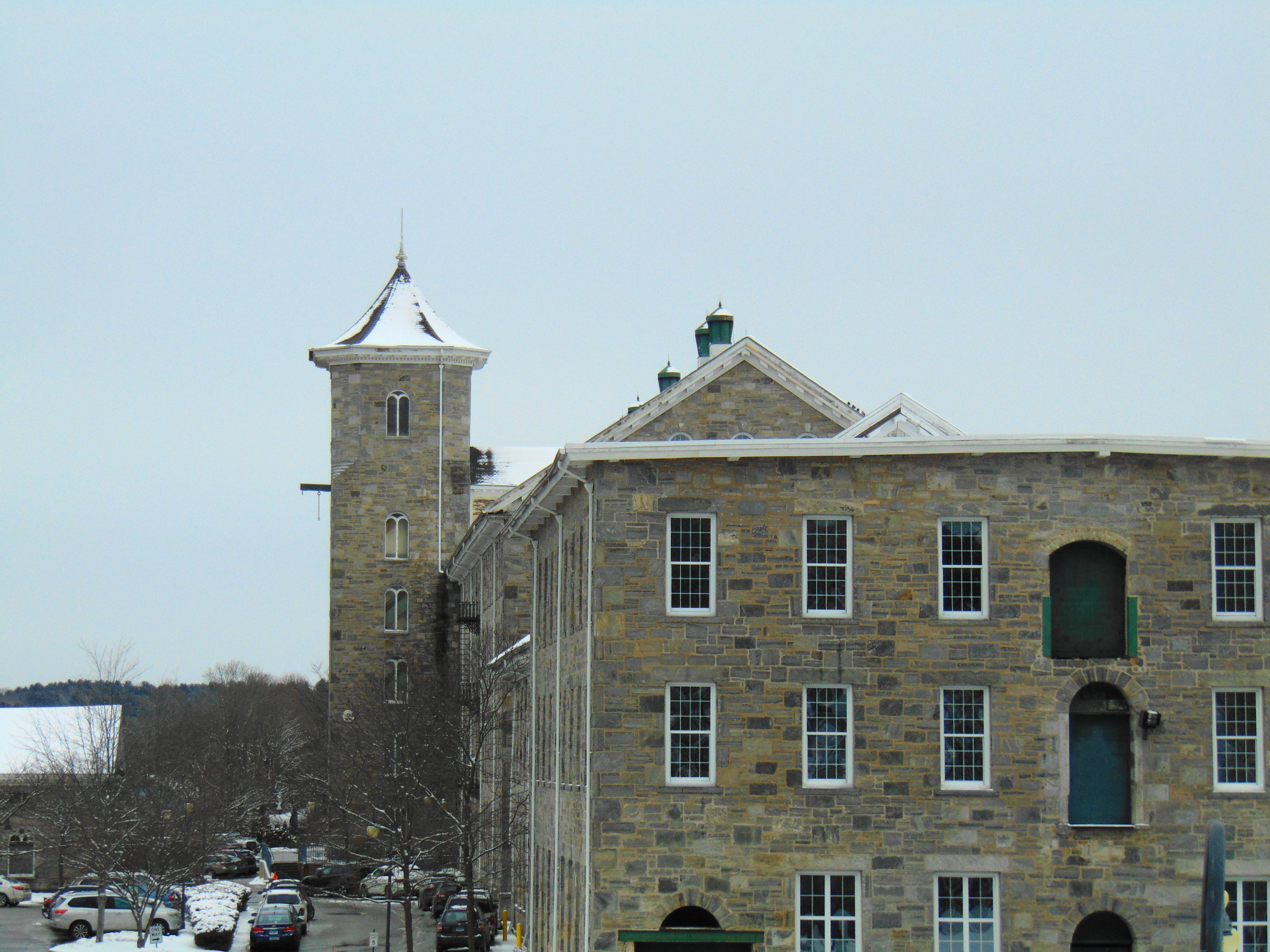
- The mills in 2018

- Location in Connecticut Location in United States

Thread
- Alternative names: Jillson Mills, American Thread Company Willimantic Mills

Ring spinning
- Current status: Mixed usage
- Structural system: Stone
- Location: Willimantic, Connecticut, United States
- Serving railway: New York and New England Railroad
- Owner: Jillson Brothers
- Further ownership: Willimantic Linen Company (1854); American Thread Company (1898)
- Coordinates: 41.7110°N 72.2045°W

Construction
- Built: First Building: 1824, Current Building: 1880/1910
- Employees: 3,500
- Demolished: Mill #03, 1990's; Chimney, 2012-2014; Mill #4, 1995 (fire)
- Floor count: 5
- Floor area: 221,000 square feet (20,500 m^{2})

Equipment
- American Thread Company
- U.S. National Register of Historic Places
- Architect: Marston, Phineas F.
- MPS: Eastern Connecticut Mills MPS
- NRHP reference No.: 14000434
- Added to NRHP: July 30, 2014

The Jillson Mills (Officially known as the Willimantic Linen Company Mill Complex) is a mill complex in Willimantic, Connecticut. The mills produced cotton thread throughout the lifespan of the operation of the mill.

== History ==
The mill was first built in 1824 in the same style as the current one by William Asa and Seth Jillson. In 1854 the old mill was purchased by investors from Hartford. They ended up forming the Willimantic Linen Company, even though they never produced linen. The company ended up rebuilding the mill in 1880 to near its current state. The last mill built on the complex was built in 1910. The mill ended up under control by the American Thread Company in 1898 due to the merger of the previous ownership of the mill. The mill was closed in 1985 due to the company moving operations to the South.

=== Current status ===
Mill #4 burned down in 1995 due to a fire caused by local children. The wooden swing bridge connecting the mills was closed permanently shortly thereafter. The mills lay dormant until the former grounds started to be purchased for commercial and residential purposes. ArtSpace currently has its Windham apartments located in this complex. The old chimney was demolished between 2012 and 2014.

=== Garden on the Bridge ===
The Garden on the Bridge is located in the complex of the former mills. It is a stone arch bridge built in 1857, that formerly was used for automobile until the Frog Bridge was opened in 2000. It is currently a pedestrian bridge with flora all over, giving the bridge a natural look. The bridge was temporarily closed until 2006 when it was reopened for its current purpose.

=== National Register of Historic Places ===
The complex was added to the National Register of Historic Places on July 30, 2014, along with other historic mills across the section of the state. This makes it the one of 22 on the list in the town of Windham.

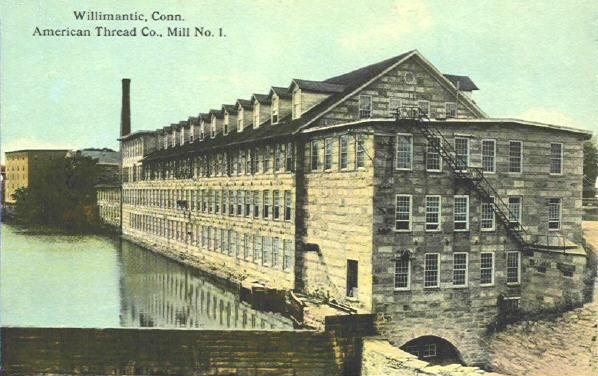
The main mill in the 1912

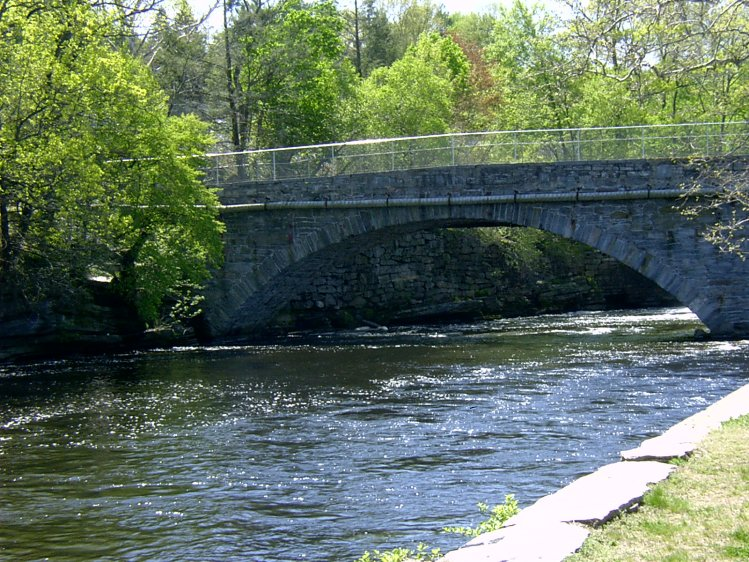
The Garden on the Bridge

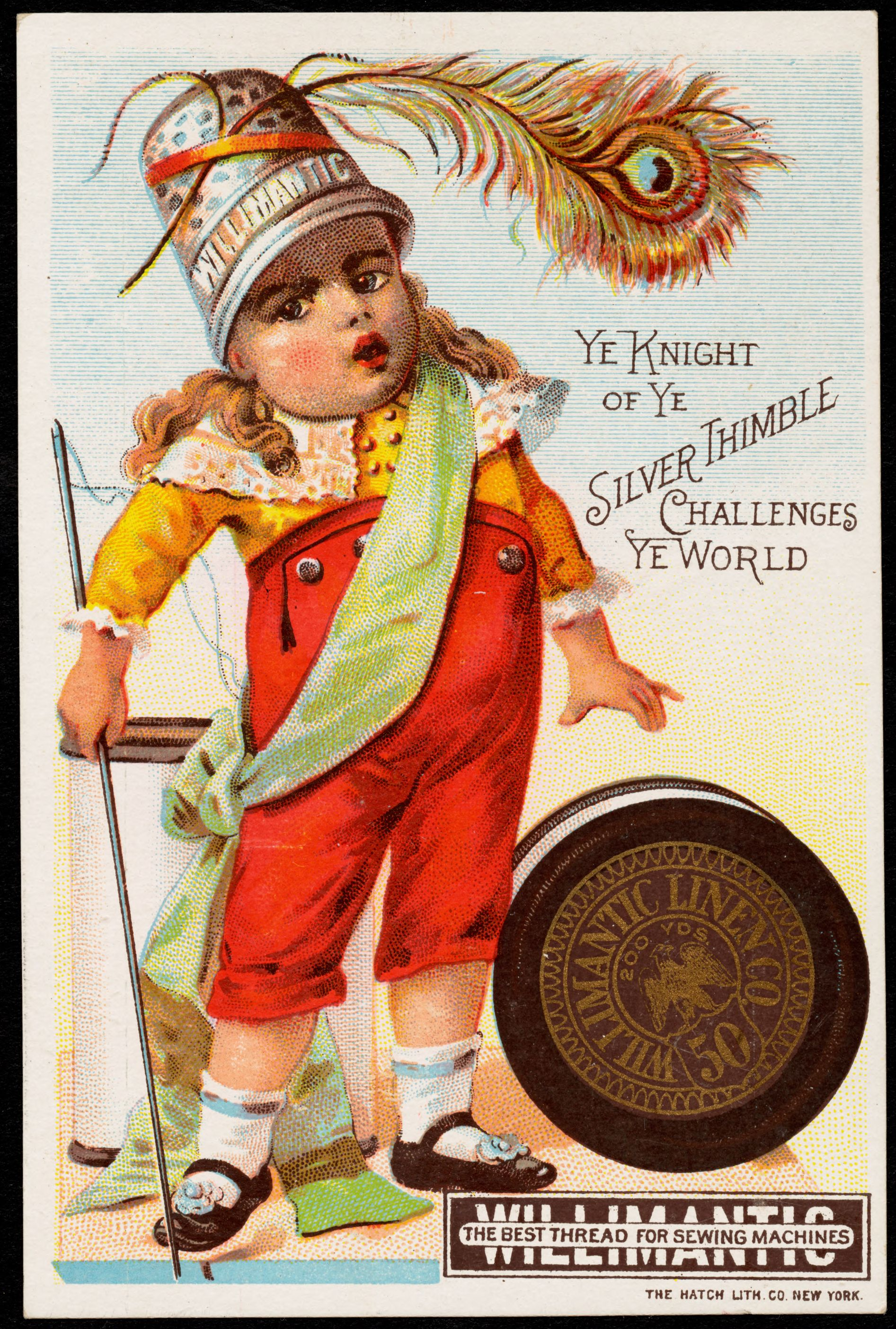
Ye Knight of ye silver thimble challenges ye world, the best thread for sewing machines, ca. 1870-1900; from the 19th Century American Trade Cards collection of the Boston Public Library

== See also ==
- National Register of Historic Places listings in Windham County, Connecticut — Documenting the NRHP addition of the mill.
- Windham Textile and History Museum — The museum nearby documenting about the mill's history.
- Willimantic Footbridge — The footbridge nearby built for employees for a safe route to the other side of the river.
- Willimantic Freight House and Office — Old place to ship freight coming from the mill.
