= James A. Kowalski =

- Dean of Cathedral of Saint John the Divine, New York
- Church: Episcopal Church in the United States of America
- Appointed: November 2001
- Installed: April 13, 2002
- Predecessor: Harry Houghton Pritchett, Jr.

Personal details
- Born: September 11, 1951 Willimantic, Connecticut

James A. Kowalski was the 9th dean of the Cathedral of Saint John the Divine, New York, of the Episcopal Church in New York City, the largest city in the United States. He had been Dean from April 13, 2002, until he stepped down effective June 2017.

Kowalski's father was Roman Catholic and his mother was Jewish, but they joined the Episcopal Church when they started a family. His father was "a blue collar worker, [who] served on the vestry...." Kowalski was born on September 11, 1951, in Willimantic, Connecticut, also described as a "blue collar town".

== Early life and work ==
As a boy, Kowalski sang in a choir, served as an acolyte, and was an Eagle Scout in a boy scout troop.

Kowalski earned a bachelor's degree in English, at Trinity College in Hartford, Connecticut, and was elected to Phi Beta Kappa, a notable honors society. He attended Episcopal Divinity School in Cambridge, Massachusetts, and, after a hiatus at New York University School of Law, he returned to theology studies in 1976 and graduated in 1978 with a master's degree in divinity. In the meantime, in 1976, he married Anne Brewer, a medical doctor who has also been an ordained Episcopal priest since 1980. They have two grown children.

In 1978, Kowalski was ordained as a deacon. He served for a time as a chaplain at the University of Vermont and was curate at Trinity Church in Newtown, Connecticut. After ordination to the priesthood, he served as priest at the Church of the Good Shepherd and Parish House in Hartford, Connecticut, from 1982 to 1993. He earned a Doctor of Ministry degree from Hartford Seminary.

Kowalski served as rector of St. Luke's Episcopal Church in Darien, Connecticut, from 1993 to 2001, for nine years at one of the largest Episcopal churches in the United States, with 4,000 members. He raised a capital campaign of $2.8 million and increased giving by $450,000 annually to St. Luke's parish. Berkeley Divinity School at Yale University awarded him an honorary Doctor of Divinity degree.

== Dean ==
In November 2001, shortly after the September 11 attacks, the Cathedral of St. John the Divine called Kowalski to be their new dean. His diverse experience, promise to stay at least 10 years, and "a penchant for fund-raising" were reasons mentioned at the time for his election as ninth dean. One search committee member said he "came across as an intelligent, accessible and articulate clergyman...." He assumed his duties as dean in March 2002. However, due to a "devastating" fire at the cathedral in December 2001, his installation was delayed until April 13, 2002. The sermon at his installation ceremony was given by Mario Cuomo, former Governor of New York.

Kowalski "works in partnership with the Bishop" and runs the largest Gothic cathedral in the world. He is "'the voice and face' of the Cathedral in terms of public and community relations." He takes pride in his preaching, stating once, "I’m an old English major, and I can overlay meanings on anything, but in this case it was just the Sunday sermon...."

As a leading priest, he speaks at other Anglican churches and cathedrals, including Manchester, England, and Covington, Kentucky. He also speaks and writes on peace in the world.

Each year on the first Sunday of October, the Cathedral of St. John the Divine celebrates the feast day of St. Francis, which is October 4, and, one year, Kowalski welcomed peacocks to the cathedral close in New York.

On November 30, 2008, Kowalski officially re-opened the cathedral after workers made repairs to the burned structure. Kowalski compared continuing the church's programs while it was being re-built was "like living through a kitchen renovation, but ...'We're only doing it on a grander scale.'" The re-dedication ceremony was co-led by Kowalski, with the Most Rev. Katharine Jefferts Schori, presiding bishop of the Episcopal Church in the United States, the Right Rev. Mark S. Sisk, the Episcopal bishop of New York. The ceremony was attended by many prominent politicians, including a former Mayor of New York, David N. Dinkins, Senator Charles E. Schumer and then-senator Hillary Clinton. After the ceremony, Kowalski said, "The massiveness of this cathedral is part of its ability to be a compelling, awe-inspiring place...."

Kowalski serves as chair of the board of trustees of The Cathedral School of St. John the Divine, New York.

In a 2015 open letter, Kowalski discussed the recent controversies about police shootings in the United States:

Democratic government will always be messy and never easy. As we aspire to equal justice under the law, our systems of justice will never be perfect. ... [T]he danger to each of us is made greater if we do not work hard for equal justice.

— James A. Kowalski

In August 2016, Kowalski announced he would retire as of June 2017 after 16 years' service. Clifton Daniel III replaced him as interim dean.

In July 2020, the Diocese of Connecticut resolved a case of abuse claims from 1984 against Kowalski involving a woman under the age of 21 who had been under his pastoral care.
