= Main Street Historic District (Willimantic, Connecticut) =

Historic district in Connecticut, United States

- U.S. National Register of Historic Places
- U.S. Historic district
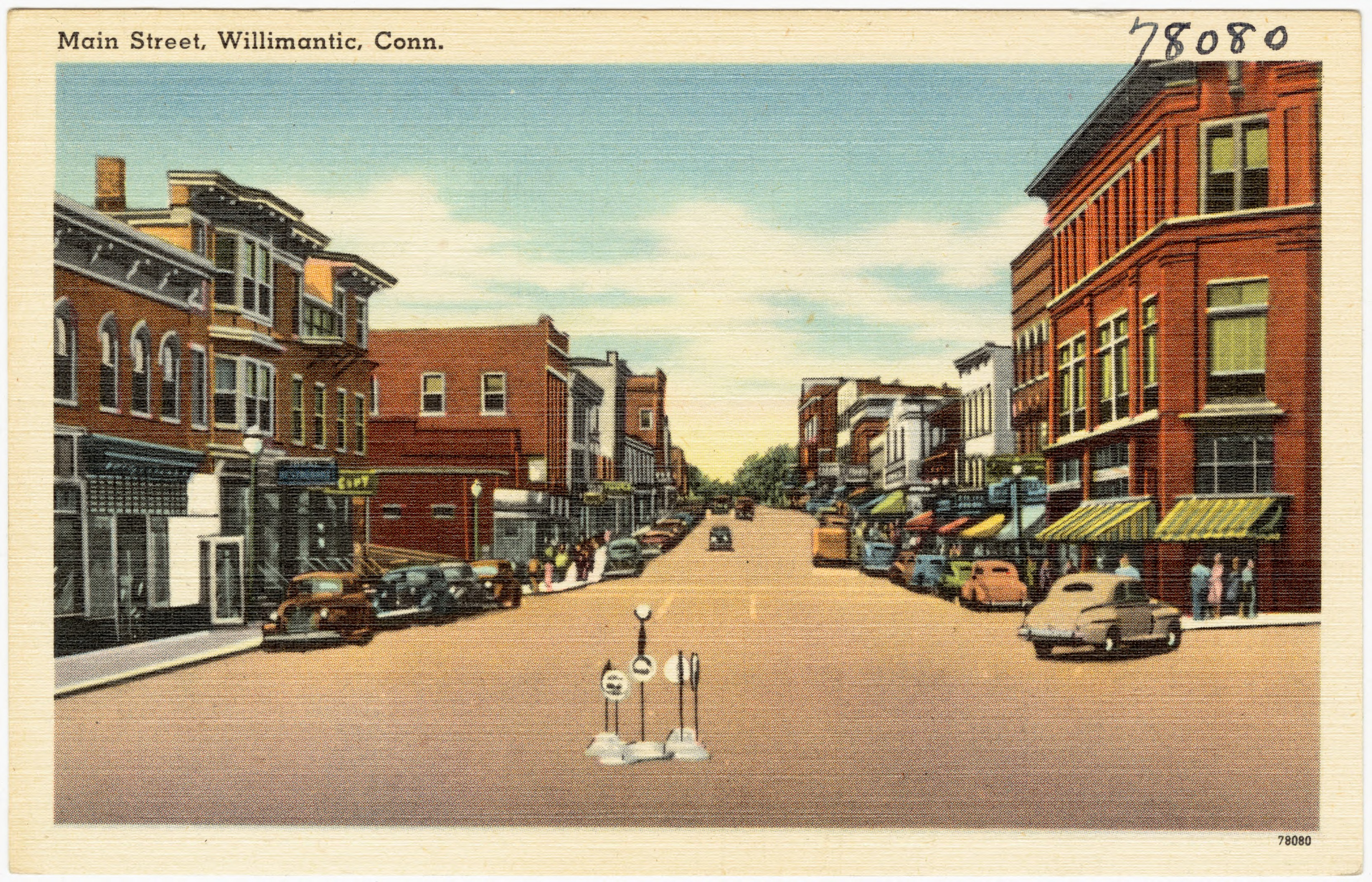
- Main Street in the 1930s

- Location within Connecticut Location within the United States
- Location: 21–65 Church Street, 667–1009 Main Street, 24–28 North Street, and 20–22 Walnut Street, 32, 50 and 54 North Street, Willimantic, Connecticut
- Coordinates: 41°42′44″N 72°12′54″W
- Area: 21 acres (8.5 ha) (original size)
- Architectural style: Late 19th And 20th Century Revivals, Late Victorian, Italianate
- NRHP reference No.: 82004410 (original); 92000902 (increase)

Significant dates
- Added to NRHP: June 28, 1982
- Boundary increase: July 29, 1992

The Main Street Historic District encompasses the historic portion of the central business district of Willimantic, in Windham, Connecticut. The district encompasses the commercial business district of Willimantic and is roughly linear along Main Street (Route 66) and Riverside Drive between Church Street and Bridge Street. It was first listed on the National Register of Historic Places in 1982. Its area was increased in 1992 to include the Hall and Bill building on North Street, built in 1889 by one of Willimantic's leading printers.

== Description and history ==
The urban center of Willimantic was first settled by English colonists in 1706, when a sawmill and gristmill were erected near the junction of the Natchaug and Willimantic Rivers. A 90-foot (27 m) drop further west on the Willimantic provided an additional source of water power, which was exploited in the early 19th century for the production of textiles. By 1836 there were six textile mills lining the river, and the growth of Willimantic as an urban commercial hub and mill village was in full swing. Main Street, laid out in 1707, formed part of the major east-west Windham Turnpike established in 1799, bringing travelers through the village as well. Later in the 19th century it became a railroad hub for the region, with two major railway lines crossing.

Beginning about 1870, Main Street was transformed by this growth from a mainly residential thoroughfare to one lined by commercial businesses. The town of Windham's civic functions were relocated from Windham Center beginning in the 1890s, with the Georgian Revival Town Hall opening in 1896. The oldest surviving commercial/industrial buildings in the district are a pair of early wood-frame mill buildings dating to the 1830s; they are located near the southwestern end of the district.

== See also ==
- National Register of Historic Places listings in Windham County, Connecticut
