= Willimantic Footbridge =

- U.S. National Register of Historic Places
- U.S. Historic district – Contributing property
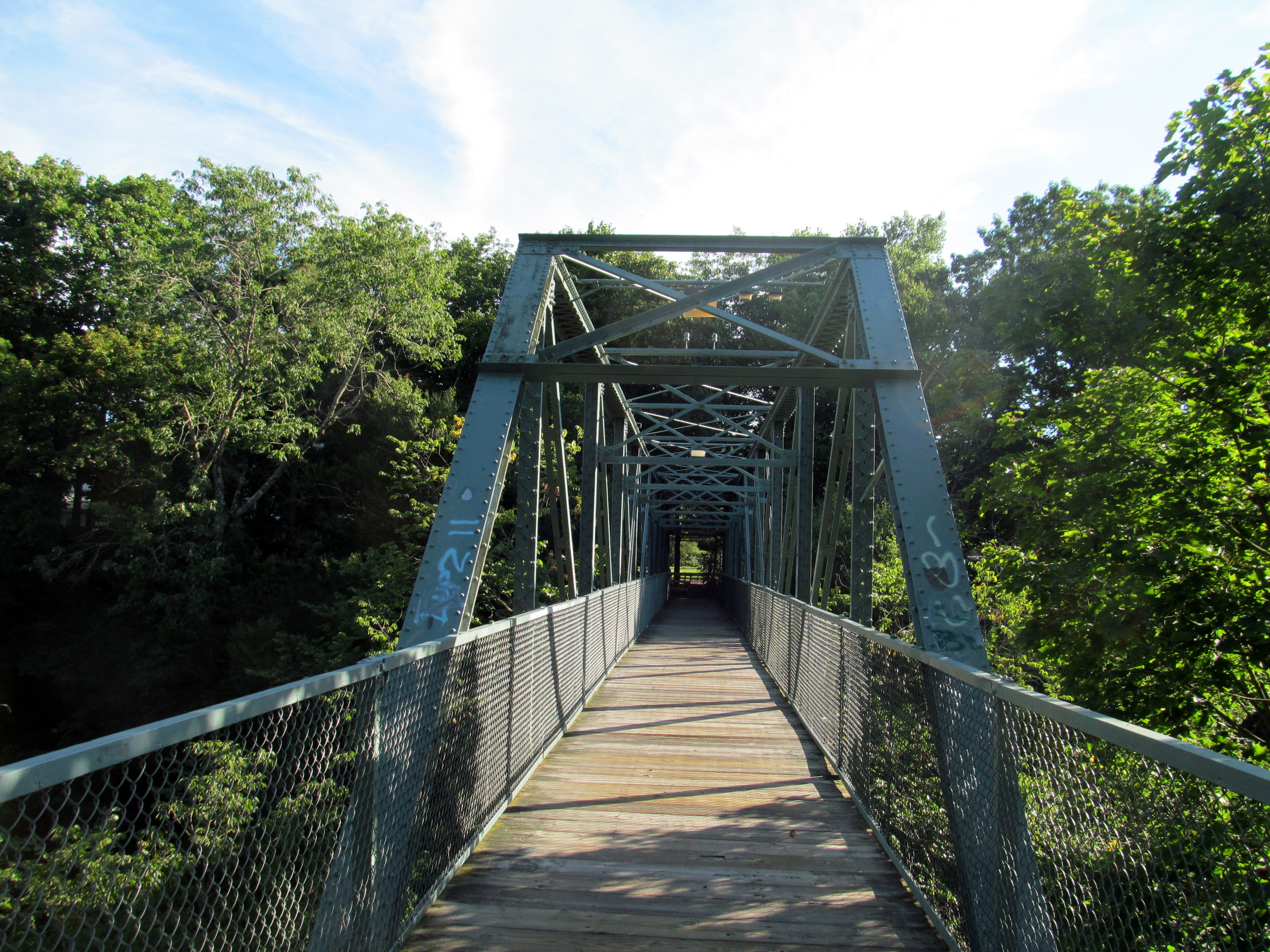
- Willimantic Footbridge in August 2013

- Location within Connecticut Location within the United States
- Location: Railroad Street, Willimantic, Connecticut
- Coordinates: 41°42′42″N 72°12′49″W
- Built: 1906
- Architect: Owego Bridge Company
- Architectural style: Steel truss footbridge
- Part of: Main Street Historic District (ID82004410)
- NRHP reference No.: 79002654

Significant dates
- Added to NRHP: April 19, 1979
- Designated CP: June 29, 1982

The Willimantic Footbridge is a pedestrian bridge in the Willimantic section of Windham, Connecticut. Built in 1906, it extends from Main Street southward, across Riverside Drive, railroad tracks, and the Willimantic River, connecting downtown Willimantic to the residential area south of the river. It is one of a small number of pedestrian bridges built in the early 20th century to survive in the state. It was listed on the National Register of Historic Places in 1979. In July 2025, the footbridge was closed to pedestrian traffic as a result of serious structural damage.

== Description and history ==
The north end of the Willimantic Footbridge is located near the eastern end of its downtown commercial district, between North and Church Streets on Main Street. The bridge is a five-span steel truss structure, about 600 feet (180 m) in length. The trusses are mainly mounted on steel trestle piers, although one is of granite rubblestone. The Main Street abutment is built out of ashlar granite blocks, while that on the south bank of the river is rubblestone. The trusses are all through trusses of three different types, with two heavy spans spanning the longest sections, across the river and the tracks of the Central Vermont Railroad. Lighter spans cross the Providence and Worcester Railroad tracks and Riverside Drive, with an even lighter span at the northernmost end.

The bridge was built in 1906 to connect the commercial core to the southern residential part of Willimantic. A bridge was first proposed for this area in 1877, but no action was taken until the early 20th century, when city leaders were seeking to create a downtown area more suitable for pedestrian use.

== See also ==
- National Register of Historic Places listings in Windham County, Connecticut
- List of bridges on the National Register of Historic Places in Connecticut
