= American Thread Building =

- U.S. National Register of Historic Places
- New York State Register of Historic Places
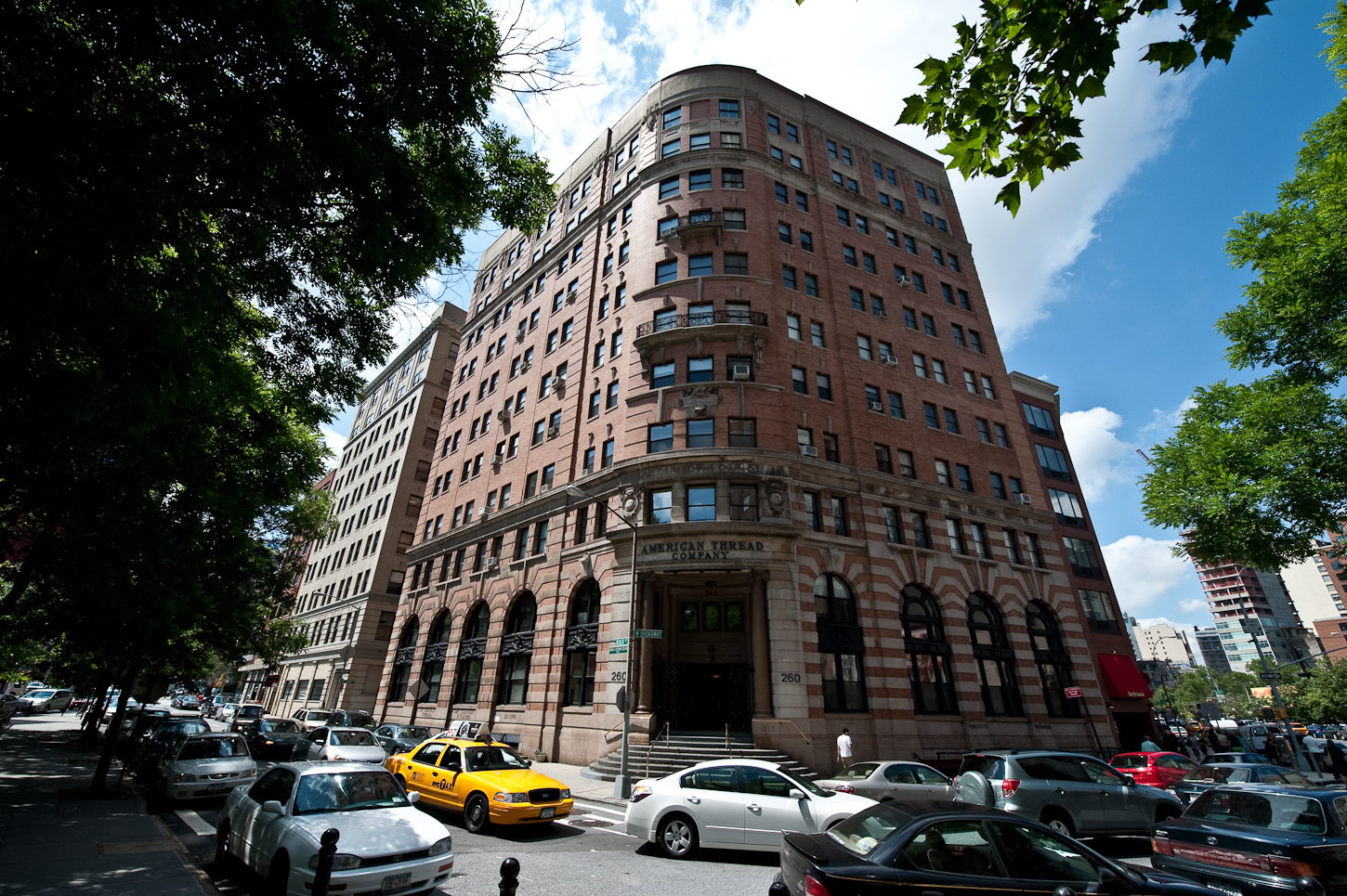

- Location within New York City Location within New York Location within the United States
- Location: 260 W. Broadway, Manhattan, New York City
- Coordinates: 40°43′14″N 74°0′22″W
- Built: 1896
- Architect: William B. Tubby
- Architectural style: Renaissance
- NRHP reference No.: 04001532
- NYSRHP No.: 06101.015037

Significant dates
- Added to NRHP: January 20, 2005
- Designated NYSRHP: November 22, 2004

The American Thread Building is a historic building located at 260 West Broadway on the corner of Beach Street in the TriBeCa neighborhood of Lower Manhattan, New York City. The eleven story building was designed in the Renaissance Revival style by architect William B. Tubby, and built in 1896. It was originally known as the Wool Exchange Building, and owned by the Wool Warehouse Company; however the Wool Company did not succeed and the building was acquired by the American Thread Company in 1907.

In 1979, a group of young artists made a stand against real estate developer Harry B. Macklowe. He emptied a 93% occupied building of its rent-paying tenants, with the help of the J51 tax abatement offered by then NYC mayor Ed Koch. It was a lost battle in the New York City courts and the building was renovated and converted into live/work lofts in 1981.

The building was added to the National Register of Historic Places on January 20, 2005.

In 2007, a renovation of one of the units uncovered an early work by artist Keith Haring.

== See also ==
- National Register of Historic Places listings in Manhattan below 14th Street
