= List of African American newspapers in Pennsylvania =

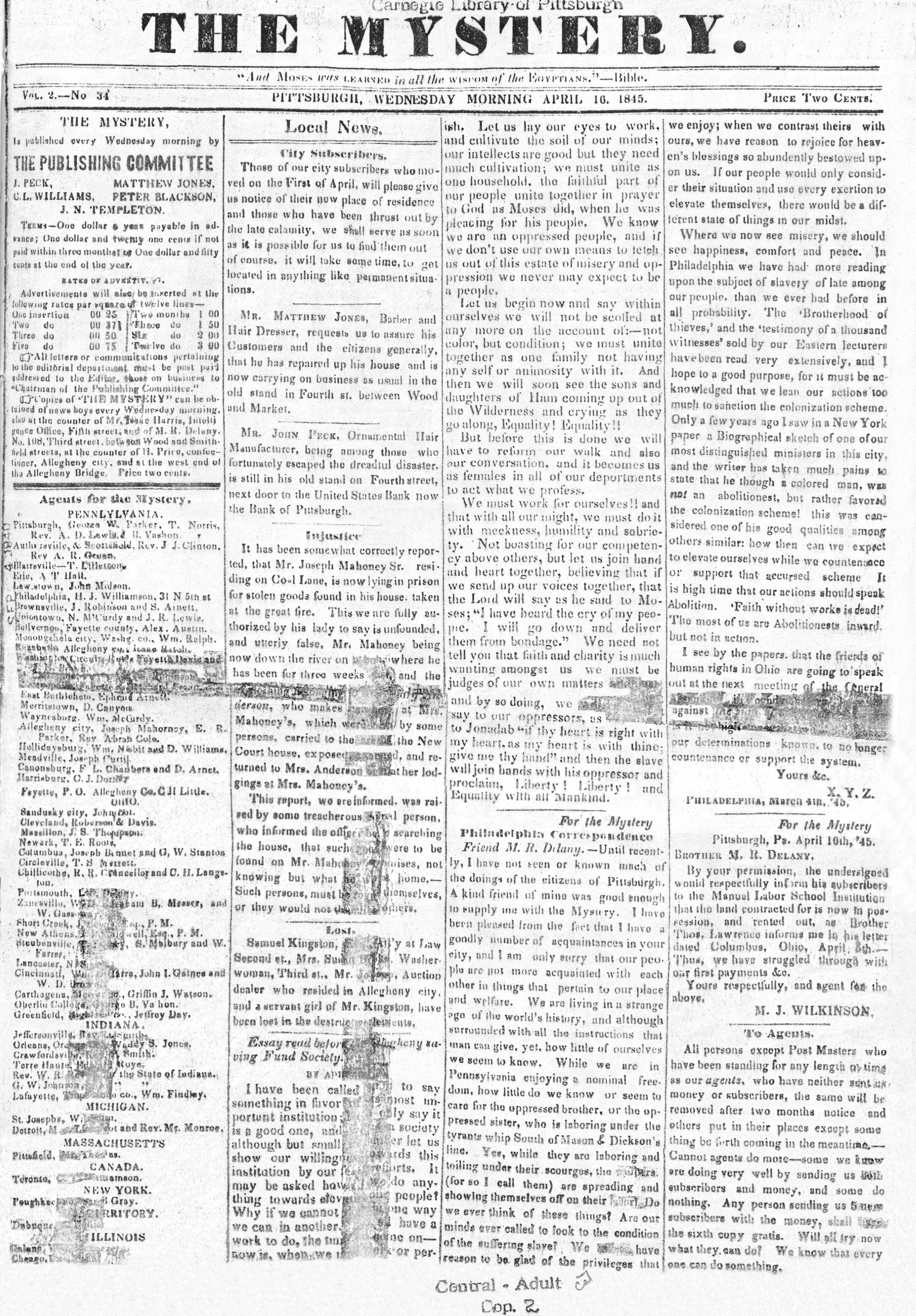
Front page of an 1845 issue of The Mystery.

This is a list of African American newspapers that have been published in the state of Pennsylvania.

This list includes both current and historical newspapers. In the 19th century, Pennsylvania saw a level of publishing that rivaled New York, with 14 African American periodicals in circulation from 1838 to 1906. Pennsylvania's first African American newspaper was The Mystery, published in Pittsburgh by Martin Robison Delany from 1843 to 1847.

Today, Pennsylvania is home to numerous active African American newspapers, including the oldest such newspaper nationwide, the Philadelphia Tribune. Other notable current newspapers include the New Pittsburgh Courier and Philadelphia Sunday Sun.

== Newspapers ==
City	Title	Beginning	End	Frequency	Call numbers	Remarks
Allentown	First World News	1993	1995	Bimonthly newspaper	ISSN 2639-958X; LCCN 2011254374; OCLC 664611225	
Harrisburg	The Harrisburg Journal	1976	?	Monthly newspaper	LCCN sn88080949; OCLC 16570321	Published by Bill Kiser
Harrisburg	The State Journal	1882 or 1883	1885	Weekly	LCCN sn83027086, 2014254315; OCLC 9868965, 7254989	
Harrisburg	The Harrisburg Tymes	1995	?	Weekly	OCLC 33424063	
Philadelphia	Philadelphia Afro-American (1937–1965); The Afro-American (1934–1937)	1934	1965	Weekly	LCCN sn84025924, sn83045816; OCLC 9673741, 10702239, 18842397	Circulation of 18,496 in 1951.
Philadelphia	The Christian Banner	1888	1920	Weekly	LCCN 2011254287, sn83027087; OCLC 745907855, 9869515	
Philadelphia	The Christian Recorder / Daily Christian Recorder	1861	1960	Weekly	LCCN sn93062890; OCLC 27975220	Associated with the African Methodist Episcopal Church.
Philadelphia	The Christian Review	1913	1952	Weekly	LCCN sn85054688	Circulation of 6,000 in 1951.
Philadelphia	The Defender	1897	1909?	Weekly	LCCN sn83027088, 2011254360; OCLC 9885792, 747837303	One issue available online; Suspended publication in November 1905.; Published by H.C.C. Astwood
Philadelphia	The Philadelphia Flame	1971	?		LCCN sn88079585; OCLC 18666635	Published by the Black United Liberation Front
Philadelphia	Flipshot News	1993	?	Monthly newspaper	OCLC 29329497	
Philadelphia	Garvey's Voice	1960s	?	Irregular	LCCN sn92060460, sn94092742; OCLC 8641694, 32785553	Extant through at least 1964.; Published by Universal Negro Improvement Association
Philadelphia	The Philadelphia Independent	1931	1971	Weekly	LCCN sn85055146; OCLC 12715626	Circulation of 24,213 in 1951.
Philadelphia	The Jamal Journal	1994		Quarterly newspaper	LCCN sn98068295; OCLC 32846849	Published by Concerned Family & Friends of Mumia Abu-Jamal.
Philadelphia	The Journal	1892	1892	Weekly	LCCN sn88079488; OCLC 18150882	Associated with Roman Catholicism.
Philadelphia	The National Leader	1982	1985	Monthly newspaper	ISSN 0744-5709; LCCN sn8203042, 850642950, sn88019240; OCLC 11810634, 19333155, 12761504, 8391610	
Philadelphia	Philadelphia New Observer / Philadelphia Observer	1976	current	Weekly	ISSN 0890-8435; LCCN sn8602567, sn94093032; OCLC 14552816, 33390581	Official site
Philadelphia	North Philly Free Press	1982	1983	Monthly	ISSN 2642-9888; LCCN 2013254349; OCLC 664611332	
Philadelphia	Odd Fellows’ Journal	1897	1917	Weekly	LCCN sn83027089; OCLC 9891050	One issue available online
Philadelphia	Schuylkill River Express	1970	1972	Irregular	LCCN sn88079584; OCLC 18665479	
Philadelphia	Scoop USA	1960	current	Weekly	ISSN 2688-6359; LCCN sn88080720; OCLC 17763219	Official site; Free weekly newspaper.; Founded by Richard Driver and published since 2018 by Sherri Horsey Darden.
Philadelphia	The Philadelphia Sunday Sun	1992	current	Weekly	OCLC 29329394	Official site
Philadelphia	Tribune Metro	1990?	?	Weekly	OCLC 31216194	
Philadelphia	The Philadelphia Tribune	1884	current	Twice weekly	ISSN 0746-956X; LCCN sn83045144; OCLC 2759971, 2266077	Official site; Oldest continuously-published African American newspaper.; Circulation of 20,916 in 1951.
Philadelphia	The Weekly Prophet	1900s	1900s	Weekly	LCCN sn88079517; OCLC 18396408	Surviving issue from 1918.; Official newspaper of the Church of God and Saints of Christ.
Pittsburgh	Pittsburgh Courier (1910–1967); New Pittsburgh Courier (1967–present)	1910	current	Weekly	LCCN sn83045181, sn83045340, sn83045182, sn84025931; OCLC 7191537, 7163977, 7163951, 7163927	Official site; Circulation of 268,447 in 1951.
Pittsburgh	Pittsburgh Homewood-Brushton News	1967?	?	Biweekly	LCCN sn87080121, sn85054968; OCLC 15474152, 12178315	Published from 1967 to 1976 by Erroll Davis.
Pittsburgh	The Mystery	1843	1847	Weekly		"[T]he first African American newspaper west of the Allegheny Mountains."
Pittsburgh	The Pennsylvania Guard	1926?	?	Unknown		
Pittsburgh	Triangle Advocate			Weekly		Circulation of 2,000 in 1951.
Pittsburgh	The Thrust	1968	?	Weekly	LCCN sn89077276; OCLC 17735407	Published by the United Movement for Progress and edited by Bouie Haden.
Reading	The ‘M’ Voice	1989?	1995	Monthly	OCLC 33424010	
West Philadelphia	Tribune Metro: West Philadelphia	1990?	?	Weekly	OCLC 35201713	Extant through at least 1993.

== See also ==
- List of African American newspapers and media outlets
- List of African American newspapers in Delaware
- List of African American newspapers in Maryland
- List of African American newspapers in New Jersey
- List of African American newspapers in New York
- List of African American newspapers in Ohio
- List of newspapers in Pennsylvania

== Works cited ==
- Blockson, Charles L. (1994). African Americans in Pennsylvania: A History and Guide. Black Classic Press. ISBN 9780933121850.
- Danky, James Philip; Hady, Maureen E., eds. (1998). African-American newspapers and periodicals : a national bibliography. Harvard University Press. ISBN 9780674007888.
- Penn, Irvine Garland (1891). The Afro-American Press and Its Editors. Willey & Company.
- Pride, Armistead Scott; Wilson, Clint C. (1997). A History of the Black Press. Howard University Press. ISBN 9780882581927.
- Smith, Jessie Carney (2012). Black Firsts: 4,000 Ground-Breaking and Pioneering Historical Events. Visible Ink Press. ISBN 9781578593699.
- Smith, Jessie Carney; Horton, Carrell Peterson, eds. (1995). Historical Statistics of Black America: Media to Vital Statistics. Gale Research. ISBN 0810393921.
