= List of African American newspapers in Rhode Island =

This is a list of African American newspapers that have been published in the state of Rhode Island. It includes both current and historical newspapers.

Relatively few African American newspapers have been published in Rhode Island. The first known such newspaper, and the only one published in the 19th century, was John Henry Ballou's Eastern Review (1879–1880). Rhode Island was thus the only state to show a net drop in African American newspapers between 1880 and 1890, namely from 1 to 0, as Irvine Garland Penn recorded in The Afro-American Press and Its Editors.

In addition to its African American newspapers, Rhode Island is the site of another important advancement in the history of the Black press: when John Carter Minkins became editor-in-chief of the Providence News-Democrat in 1906, he was the first African American to head a daily newspaper that catered to the white community. Upon leaving the News-Democrat in 1911, Minkins purchased the weekly Rhode Island Examiner, which under his leadership gave front-page coverage to issues affecting African Americans.

== Newspapers ==
City	Title	Beginning	End	Frequency	Call numbers	Remarks
Providence	The Advance	1906	?	Monthly newspaper	LCCN sn92063903; OCLC 25116082	Suspended publication from June to December 1935.
Providence	The Providence American	1986	current	Biweekly or monthly	ISSN 1521-0197; LCCN sn92063968; OCLC 25323488	Official site; Founded by Frank Graham, and purchased by Peter Wells in 2006.; Became online-only in 2019.
Providence	Providence Chronicle	1939	1957	Weekly	LCCN sn85042514; OCLC 12597287	Published by William D. Wiley.; Circulation of 1,541 in 1951.
Providence	The Citizen	1968	1970s	Weekly	LCCN sn92063966; OCLC 25323334	Published by John E. Singleton
Providence	Eastern Review	1879	1880	Weekly		Edited by John Henry Ballou, Rhode Island's first African American attorney.; Weekly circulation of approximately 500.; Only African American newspaper published in Rhode Island through at least 1890.
Providence	The Ebenezer Grapevine	1978	1980s	Monthly newspaper	LCCN sn92063967; OCLC 25323389	Followed by the Ocean State Grapevine.; Published by Ebenezer Baptist Church.
Providence	New England Torch Light / New England Torchlight	1890s		Weekly		Published by J.W. Henderson. Edited by Barney McKay.
Providence	The North Star	1977	?	Monthly newspaper	LCCN sn92063999; OCLC 25480200	
Providence	Ocean State Grapevine	1986	1980s	Twice-monthly or biweekly	LCCN sn92064032; OCLC 25323430	Billed as “Rhode Island’s only Black newspaper.”; Successor to the Ebenezer Grapevine, and published by Coach's Cultural Hour, Inc.
Providence	The Sun	1890s		Weekly		

== See also ==
- List of African American newspapers and media outlets
- List of African American newspapers in Connecticut
- List of African American newspapers in Massachusetts
- List of newspapers in Rhode Island

== Works cited ==
- Danky, James Philip; Hady, Maureen E., eds. (1998). African-American newspapers and periodicals : a national bibliography. Harvard University Press. ISBN 9780674007888.
- Lemons, J. Stanley; Lambert, Diane (2003). "John Carter Minkins: Pioneering African-American Newspaperman". The New England Quarterly. 76 (3): 413–438. doi:10.2307/1559809. JSTOR 1559809.
- Penn, Irvine Garland (1891). The Afro-American Press and Its Editors. Willey & Company.
- Smith, Jessie Carney; Horton, Carrell Peterson, eds. (1995). Historical Statistics of Black America: Media to Vital Statistics. Gale Research. ISBN 0810393921.
