= List of African American newspapers in New Jersey =

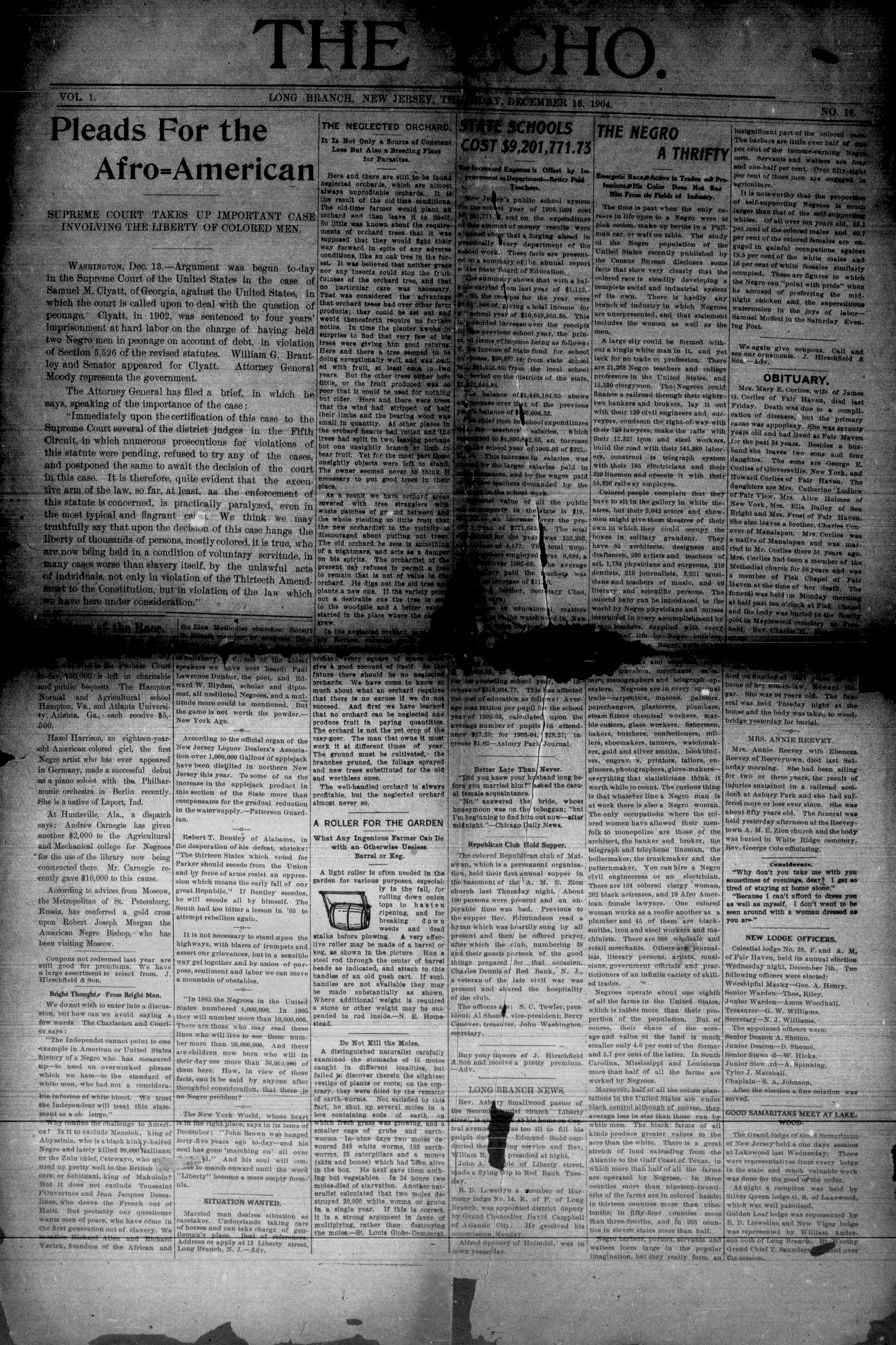
Front page of The Echo from 1904, announcing the argument before the Supreme Court in the Clyatt v. United States peonage case.

This is a list of African American newspapers that have been published in the state of New Jersey. It includes both current and historical newspapers.

Among the first such newspapers in New Jersey was Trenton's The Sentinel, established in 1880. The Black press in New Jersey grew substantially in the early 20th century, from approximately 12 newspapers in 1900 to around 35 in 1940.

In addition to New Jersey–based newspapers, many communities in New Jersey have been served by newspapers published in New York or Philadelphia, such as the Philadelphia Independent.

== Newspapers ==
City	Title	Beginning	End	Frequency	Call numbers	Remarks
Camden	The Black Observer	1968	?	Unknown		
Camden	The Camden News	1915	?	Weekly		
East Orange	Essex Forum	1972	?	Biweekly, then weekly	LCCN sn88071370; OCLC 18514779	
Hillside	African World	1994	?	Monthly	OCLC no	
Long Branch / Red Bank	The Echo	1904	1943	Weekly	LCCN sn88071050; OCLC 17494843	Available online; Founded by William Elijah Rock.; Moved from Long Branch to Red Bank around 1910.
Montclair	The Jersey Express	1932?	?	Weekly		
Newark	New Jersey Afro-American	1941	1991	Weekly	LCCN sn84025926; OCLC 2634939, 2264866	"[T]he longest running and most widely read black newspaper in New Jersey."; Circulation of 14,609 in 1951.
Newark	Black Newark (1968) / Black News (1969) / Black New Ark (1972–1974)	1968	1974	Monthly newspaper	Black Newark: LCCN sn2001062056; OCLC 47228355; Black News: LCCN 2019238428; OCLC 173893626; Black New Ark: LCCN sn2001062050; OCLC 32993495	Edited by Yusef Iman and Daoud Abdullah.
Newark	The Forum	1970s	?	Biweekly	LCCN sn88071371; OCLC 18514783	
Newark	Greater News	1979?		Weekly	OCLC 20252858	
Newark	The New Jersey Guardian	1934	1942	Weekly	LCCN sn89069097; OCLC 19016511	
Newark	The Newark Herald	1928	1939	Weekly	LCCN sn88071222; OCLC 19743660	
Newark	The Newark Herald	1938	?		LCCN 2012210650; OCLC 2696527	
Newark	New Jersey Herald News	1938	1966	Weekly	LCCN sn84025698; OCLC 10284983	Circulation of 28,371 in 1951.
Newark	Nite Lite	1959?	?	Weekly		
Newark	New Jersey Record	?	1947	Weekly		
Newark	New Jersey Trumpet	1887	1897	Weekly	LCCN sn87068175; OCLC 15671833	Founded by William Murrell.
Orange	Harambee	1990?		Bimonthly	OCLC 25266785	Billed as a “newspaper for young readers that focuses on the African American experience.”
Paterson	The Liberator	1950	?	Weekly		
Paterson	North Jersey Independent	1950	?	Weekly		Circulation of 26,498 in 1951.
Paterson	The Northern New Jersey Informer	1950	?	Weekly		
Plainfield	City News	1983		Weekly		Published by Jan Edgenton Johnson.
Plainfield	The Voice	1968	1974?	Weekly	LCCN sn88063027; OCLC 17430825	
Princeton	The Citizen	1909	?	Weekly	OCLC 38227497	
Saddle River	The Landscape	1885?	1901	Monthly newspaper		
Swedesboro	South Jersey Journal	2011	2018	Monthly newspaper		Edited and published by Irving Randolph.
Somerset	The Franklin Voice	1996		Monthly newspaper	OCLC 36814737	Edited by Paula McCoy-Pinderhughes.
Teaneck	The Connection / North Jersey Connection	1982?	?	Weekly or biweekly	The Connection: LCCN sn88071369, sn94093165; OCLC 18514803, 32807946; North Jersey Connection: LCCN sn92060412, sn94093015; OCLC 25568384, 33390162	Extant through at least 1991.; Published by Ralph F. Johnson.
Trenton	The Nubian News	1989?	current	Monthly	OCLC 28588271	Official feed
Trenton	The Sentinel / Expositor	1880	1882 or 1883	Weekly	LCCN 2014254331, sn84026314; OCLC 664615924, 10388917	"Trenton’s first – and one of the state’s earliest – Black newspapers."; Founded, edited and published by R. Henri Herbert.; Merged into Trenton Herald.

== See also ==
- List of African American newspapers and media outlets
- List of African American newspapers in Delaware
- List of African American newspapers in New York
- List of African American newspapers in Pennsylvania
- List of newspapers in New Jersey

== Works cited ==
- Danky, James Philip; Hady, Maureen E., eds. (1998). African-American newspapers and periodicals : a national bibliography. Harvard University Press. ISBN 9780674007888.
- Penn, Irvine Garland (1891). The Afro-American Press and Its Editors. Willey & Company.
- Price, Clement Alexander (1980). Freedom Not Far Distant: A Documentary History of Afro-Americans in New Jersey. New Jersey Historical Society. ISBN 9780911020014.
- Smith, Jessie Carney; Horton, Carrell Peterson, eds. (1995). Historical Statistics of Black America: Media to Vital Statistics. Gale Research. ISBN 0810393921.
