= Anna Belle Rhodes Penn =

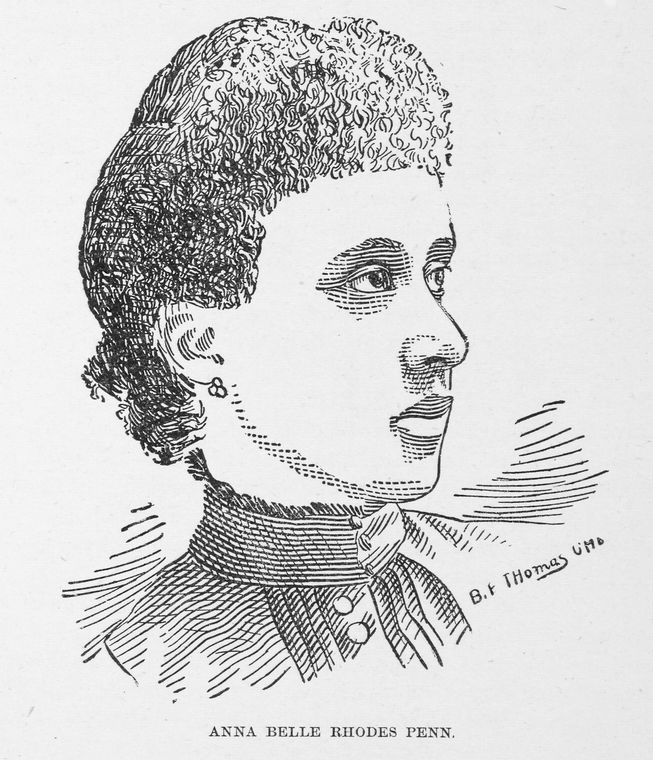
- Born: Anna Belle Rhodes; 18 June 1865; Paris, Kentucky
- Died: 4 June 1930 (aged 64); Cincinnati, Ohio
- Resting place: The United American Cemetery
- Education: Shaw University
- Occupations: Poet, essayist, educator
- Spouse: Irvine Garland Penn (m. 1889)
- Children: 7

Anna Belle Rhodes Penn (18 June 1865 – 4 June 1930) was an African American essayist, poet, and educator, who began her studies at Shaw University aged just thirteen.

== Early life and education ==
Anna Belle Rhodes was born in Paris, Kentucky on 18 June 1865, the daughter of William Emerson and Sophia Piland Rhodes. While Anna was still young, her parents moved to Lynchburg, Virginia, where she attended a private school. Academically gifted, she began studies at Shaw University aged just 13, in 1878. She earned her BA in Classics in 1880, spending two years teaching at the university before returning to Virginia to continue her teaching career. In 1886, she attended a summer institute at the Virginia Normal and Collegiate Institute (now Virginia State University), then a requirement for teachers in the state. Its summer institute only having been started two years earlier, Rhodes was one of the first black women to participate in the program. M.A. Majors records her prominent role in the institute's events:

At the closing exercises of the summer normal held at the Virginia Normal and Collegiate Institute, Petersburg, Va., in 1886, Mrs. Penn was assigned the duty of essayist upon the occasion. The title of the essay for the occasion was "All that glitters is not gold." It was well arranged and winningly delivered in Madame's own particular style. It was enthusiastically received. The president, John Mercer Langston, LL.D., commenting on the essay, its delivery, etc., said that for chasteness of language, beauty of diction and composition it was one of the best he had ever heard. He was very elaborate in his complimentary comment, showing that under its mellifluous flow he had grown rapturously dizzy.

The praise Majors describes came from John Mercer Langston, the university's president and the uncle of Langston Hughes, for whom the poet was named.

Anna married fellow educator Irvine Garland Penn on 26 December 1889, in Lynchburg, Virginia. The couple had seven children: Wilhelmina (b. 1890), Irvine Garland Jr. (b. 1892), Georgia (b. 1894), Elizabeth (b. 1896), Louise (b. 1898), Marie (b. 1900), and Anna Belle (b. 1903).

== Work ==
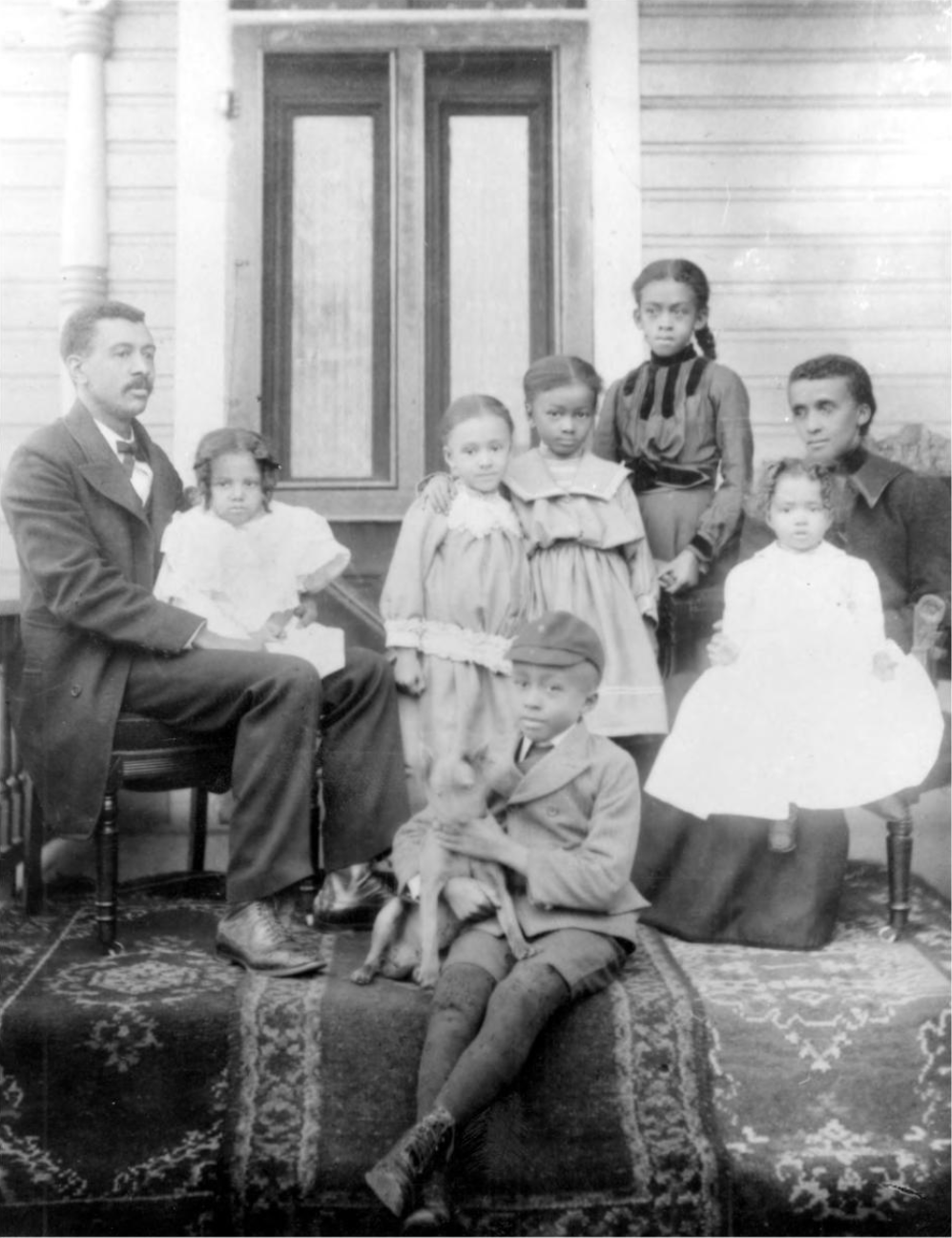
The Penn family, c. 1900

Anna had begun to write essays and poetry while still in school, encouraged by friends and teachers, later becoming noted for her writings. She read a poem titled 'No Footsteps Backward' at her own graduation, and on 1 December 1890, she read 'Light Out of Darkness' at the Quarto-Centennial Celebration of Shaw University. Jessie Carney Smith describes the poem as celebrating 'Shaw's role in alleviating the illiteracy slavery inflicted upon black Americans,' its 'dominant images' being 'light and dark, thus giving the poem a Biblical as well as a political tone.' As Smith notes, however, Penn also used her poetry to explore themes of a more personal nature, such as love and grief. Her poems and prose was published in various newspapers, according to Majors, garnering praise. She was also, he writes, 'well known as an elocutionist, accomplished and able', and 'very frequently called for wherever she is heard'.

Described during her lifetime as 'a great helpmate to her husband in his busy career,' Penn has since been acknowledged as providing valuable assistance to Irvine when preparing his first book: The Afro-American Press and Its Editors (1891). An essay by Anna Belle Rhodes Penn was also included in his 1902 publication The United Negro: His Problems and His Progress, an edited compilation of the proceedings at the Negro Young People's Christian Educational Congress. Though Majors wrote in his 1893 work that 'the reading Afro-American must not be surprised if the Madame gives a book to the world of letters in the near future', Penn does not appear to have published one.

== Death ==
Anna Belle Rhodes Penn died in 1930, just a few weeks before her husband. Both were buried in the Colored American Cemetery, Cincinnati.
