= List of African American newspapers in New York =

Inaugural issue of Freedom's Journal, published on Varick Street in Manhattan in 1827.

This is a list of African American newspapers that have been published in the state of New York. It includes both current and historical newspapers. New York was the birthplace of the African American press, with the publication of Freedom's Journal in 1827, and has remained a vibrant center of publishing ever since.

== Newspapers ==
=== Upstate ===
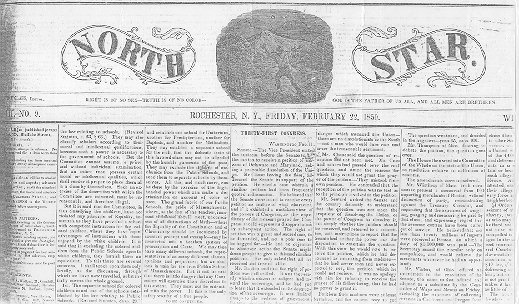
An 1856 issue of The North Star, published at Rochester.

For the purpose of this list, Upstate New York is the entirety of New York State outside of New York City and Long Island.

City	Title	Beginning	End	Frequency	Call numbers	Remarks
Albany	Albany Capitol	1890s	?	Monthly newspaper	LCCN sn88074173; OCLC 17845789	Attested in at least 1894.
Albany	The Community Chronicle; The Community News (1993)	1993	1990s	Monthly newspaper	LCCN sn94057530; OCLC 29973149	Attested through at least 1994.; Edited by Arthur Mitchell.
Albany / Buffalo	The Fortnightly Spectator	1899	1900s	Biweekly	LCCN sn88074128; OCLC 17383311	Attested through at least 1900.
Albany	The Albany Liberator	1960s	1900s	Biweekly	LCCN 2003252468, sn93023929; OCLC 7379634, 1479007	Attested from at least 1967–1968.
Albany	The New York Sojourner-Herald; The Sojourn-Herald (1993–1994)	1993	?	Monthly newspaper	ISSN 2574-6537; LCCN 2014254332, sn94057584; OCLC 664611392, 30534090; Sojourn-Herald: LCCN sn94057531; OCLC 29973340	Extant through at least 1998.; Edited by Paul C. Webster.
Albany	The Northern Star and Freeman's Advocate	1842	1843	Weekly or monthly	LCCN sn83027104, 2014254008; OCLC 10126298, 2771128, 851183192	
Albany	The Scene; South End Scene	1977	1990s	Monthly newspaper	LCCN sn88074121; OCLC 17383253; South End Scene: LCCN sn85054474; OCLC 6833043	
Albany	Urban Voices	2000	?	Monthly newspaper	LCCN sn00063004; OCLC 43464870	"Executive editor: Kenneth Braswell; contributing editor: Carolee Sherwood."
Albany	Whazup!	1994	1990s	Monthly newspaper	LCCN sn00063136; OCLC 32473746	Attested through at least 1995.
Buffalo	The Buffalo American	1920	?	Weekly	LCCN sn89080114; OCLC 25566195, 3855347	
Buffalo	Black News	1970	?	Unknown		
Buffalo	The Buffalo Broadcaster	1937?	?	Weekly		
Buffalo	The Buffalo Criterion / The Metropolitan Buffalo Criterion (1973–1978)	1925	current	Weekly		Hiatus from 1973 to 1978.
Buffalo	The Empire Star Weekly; The Empire Star (1948–1953)	1948	?	Weekly	LCCN sn88074214, sn8807435; OCLC 17892949	Circulation of 8,115 in 1951.
Buffalo	Empire State Bulletin	1966	1900s	Weekly	LCCN sn95071157; OCLC 32217750	
Buffalo	Fine Print	1972?	?	Weekly	LCCN sn8205865; OCLC 4408200	Published by Ronald H. Fleming. Edited by Carolyn Fleming.
Buffalo	The Buffalo Guardian	1946	1900s	Weekly	LCCN sn95071172; OCLC 32656938	Edited by Eric E.L. Hercules.
Buffalo	The Buffalo Newscaster	1963	1900s	Weekly	LCCN sn95071165; OCLC 32217727	Edited by Calvin Kimbrough.
Buffalo	Buffalo Spokesman	1928?	?	Weekly		
Buffalo	Buffalo Weekly Challenger	1977	1979	Weekly	ISSN 0278-3320; LCCN sc80001806; OCLC 4231809	
Buffalo	Challenger Community News / Challenger / Buffalo, New York Challenger News Weekly / Buffalo Challenger (1979–1981); Challenger News Weekly	1962	current	Weekly	ISSN 1040-8886; LCCN sn93063790, sc8001806, sn93063791, sn8808776; OCLC 4231848, 4231809, 20021548, 18572480	Official site
Hastings on Hudson	The Westchester County Press	1928	current	Weekly	ISSN 0043-3373; LCCN sn78001164; OCLC 3961369	Published in White Plains from May 4 to December 28, 1989.; Edited and published by Sandra Blackwell as of 2018.; Circulation of 12,000.
Ithaca	The Monitor	1923	1900s	Monthly newspaper	LCCN sn91066131; OCLC 23055790	Published by J. Elliott Douglass, Jr.
Ithaca	The Wheat Street Independent	1990	?	Monthly newspaper	LCCN sn91066181; OCLC 23232383	Motto: "Until the last blade of grass is free."
Mount Vernon	The Westchester Observer	1947?	1971?	Weekly	LCCN sn2002061468; OCLC 26522048	Edited and published by Ben Anderson.
Newburgh	The Hudson Valley Black Press	1983 or 1984	current	Weekly	ISSN 1527-3709; LCCN sn910666240; OCLC 24124499	Official site
Poughkeepsie	Mid-Hudson Herald	1968	1900s	Biweekly	LCCN sn90066260; OCLC 22369535	
Rochester	Rochester Challenger	1962	1971?	Weekly	LCCN sn93063790; OCLC 4231848	
Rochester	The Communicade	1972 or 1973?	?	Biweekly	LCCN sn88074065; OCLC 5510824	
Rochester	Douglass' Monthly	1858	1863	Monthly newspaper	LCCN sn87070160, 2020260054; OCLC 1566916, 708102351	Edited by Frederick Douglass.
Rochester	Frederick Douglass Voice	1967	1970s	Biweekly	LCCN sn88074779; OCLC 18545146	
Rochester	Frederick Douglass Voice	1934?	?	Weekly	LCCN sn88074780, sn88074779; OCLC 18545040, 18545146	Published by Howard W. Coles. Edited by Alma K. Coles.
Rochester	Frederick Douglass' Paper	1851	1860	Weekly	LCCN sn84026366; OCLC 4732866, 10426474	Published by Frederick Douglass.
Rochester	The North Star	1847	1851	Weekly	LCCN sn84026364; OCLC 10426469	Published by John Dick. Edited by Frederick Douglass.
Rochester	Star			Weekly		Circulation of 2,825 in 1951.
Rochester	The Voice; Rochester Voice; Voice of New York State	1933	1967	Biweekly	LCCN sn88074778, sn88074780; OCLC 18544932	Circulation of 3,267 in 1951.
Schenectady	The Communicator	1993	?	Monthly newspaper	LCCN sn97063701; OCLC 38086314	In English and Spanish.
Syracuse	The Syracuse Banner	1980	?	Irregular	LCCN sn91066498; OCLC 23674824	Published in Dewitt, New York from 1981 to 1986.
Syracuse	CNY Syracuse Gazette	1980	1980	Weekly	LCCN sn92061464; OCLC 25271649	
Syracuse	Syracuse Challenger	1970	1900s	Weekly	LCCN sn92061841; OCLC 25895812	
Syracuse	The Syracuse Constitution	1989	?	Irregular	LCCN sn92061461; OCLC 25262719	Attested through at least 2000.
Syracuse	The Syracuse Crusader	1988	?	Monthly newspaper	LCCN sn92061462; OCLC 25271475	
Syracuse	Syracuse Gazette News Weekly	1973	1976	Irregular	LCCN sn92061842; OCLC 25896033	
Syracuse	Syracuse Gazette	1900s	1973	Irregular	LCCN sn92061463; OCLC 25271569	
Syracuse	The Syracuse Gazette	1976	1980	Weekly	LCCN sn92061843; OCLC 25901837	
Syracuse	Home Town News	1960s	1960s	Weekly	LCCN sn88084251; OCLC 18487444	Published by Chris Powell.
Syracuse	The Impartial Citizen	1980	?	Weekly	ISSN 0738-9116; LCCN sn83004203, sn94086256; OCLC 9668392, 32330870	Billed as "[t]he nation's first multi-ethnic newspaper."; Extant through at least 1990.; Some articles in Spanish.
Syracuse	Progressive Herald	1932	1957	Weekly	LCCN sn91066448; OCLC 23610089	Official organ of the Federation of Colored Men's Clubs.; Circulation of 5,500 in 1951.
Utica	The Utica Sentinel / The Black Sentinel (1983)	1983	1900s	Monthly newspaper	LCCN sn91066912; OCLC 24357521	Published by Suzanne M. Felton and Willie R. Felton.
Utica	The Western Echo	1870s	?		LCCN sn89071393; OCLC 20303111	Extant through at least 1878.
White Plains	The Westchester County Press	1928	2010s	Weekly	LCCN sn7801164; OCLC 3961369	

=== Long Island ===
City	Title	Beginning	End	Frequency	Call numbers	Remarks
Freeport	Community Journal	1993	?	Biweekly	LCCN sn95071199; OCLC 32455893	
Great Neck	New York Trend	1991		Bimonthly newspaper	ISSN 1083-5822; LCCN sn95004098; OCLC 32848337	
Hempstead	Hempstead Beacon (1963–); The Beacon (1956–1963)	1956		Weekly	Hempstead Beacon: LCCN sn9706363 sn9-706363; OCLC 24783433; Beacon: LCCN sn9706363 sn9-706363; OCLC 36981670	Edited by Sheila H. Noeth.
Hempstead	Community Reporter	1990s	?	Monthly newspaper	LCCN sn95071200; OCLC 32455649	
Hempstead	Economic Forum	1973?	?	Biweekly	ISSN 1041-0864; OCLC 27834429	
Hempstead	Hempstead Village Times	1996	?	Unknown	OCLC 37305009	
Huntington	Black Starliner	1988	1900s	Monthly newspaper	LCCN sn97063605; OCLC 36145077	
Long Island	Long Island Call	1952	?	Weekly		
Roosevelt	Community Journal	1993	?	Twice monthly or weekly	LCCN sn97063676; OCLC 36500262	Attested through at least 1996.
West Hempstead	Long Island Rapper	1973	?	Weekly	LCCN sn84031913; OCLC 11386657	
Westbury	Long Island Free Press	1970	1970s	Monthly newspaper	LCCN sn93023893; OCLC 15076429	
Wyandanch	Point Of View	1900s		Biweekly	LCCN sn95071110; OCLC 32029831	Founded and edited by Delano Stewart.

=== New York City ===

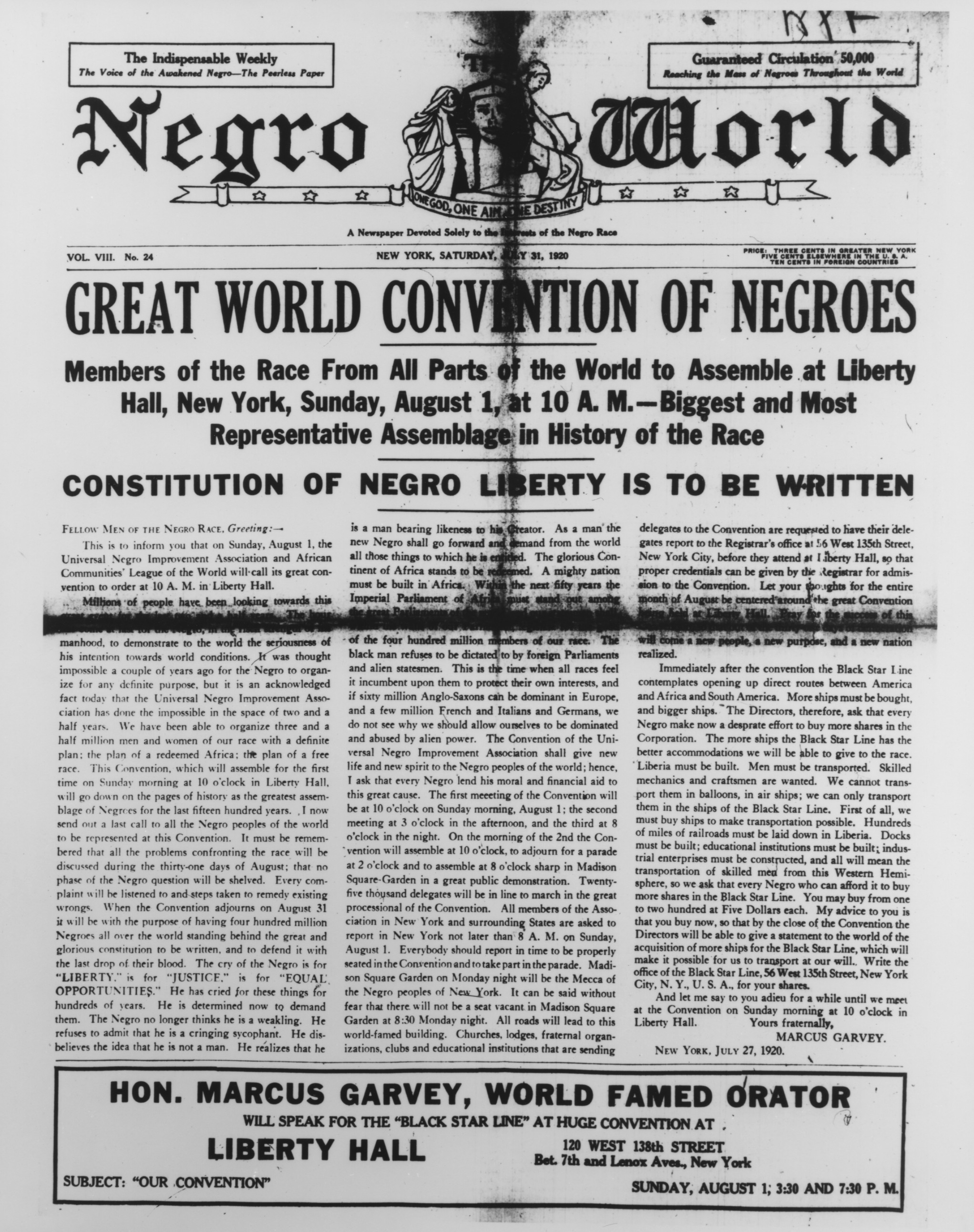
A 1920 issue of Marcus Garvey's Negro World.

Newspapers are listed by borough where available.

City	Title	Beginning	End	Frequency	Call numbers	Remarks
Bronx	Caribbean Daylight	1992		Weekly	OCLC 30607441	Official page
Bronx	The Bronx Independent	1956	?	Monthly except July and August		
Bronx	The Listener-News: Thought And Opinion / The Listener: Thought And Opinion (1938–1939)	1938	1900s	Weekly	LCCN 2019254365; OCLC 1119557308	
Brooklyn	New York Echo	1974	1900s	Weekly	LCCN sn89070005; OCLC 19059738	Published by Echo Reporter Inc.
Brooklyn	The Brooklyn Advocate	1993		Monthly newspaper	OCLC 37517496	
Brooklyn	Afro Times / Afro-American Times (1987)	1987		Weekly	ISSN 1044-7199; LCCN sn8907723; OCLC 18878353	
Brooklyn	Big Apple After Five	1975	1994?	Weekly	OCLC 33107901	
Brooklyn	Black Community	1968	?	Twice monthly newspaper	LCCN sn88084249; OCLC 18487322	
Brooklyn	The City Sun	1984	1996	Weekly	OCLC 10868443	Published by Utrice C. Leid. Edited by Andrew Cooper.
Brooklyn	Daily Challenge; New York Daily Challenge	1972	?	Daily (except Saturday, Sunday and legal holidays)	ISSN 0746-8865; LCCN sn8409567; OCLC 10378434	Edited by Thomas H. Watkins.; Circulation of 79,540 in 1999.; Began placing daily news online in 2000.; Officially Democratic.; Billed as "[t]he City's only black daily."
Brooklyn	Fort Greene News	1991?		Twice a month		Edited by S. Eric Blackwell.
Brooklyn	Haiti Diaspo	1987?	?	Monthly	OCLC 33107897	Published by Haitian Universitarian Association.; Mostly in French.
Brooklyn	Haïti Progrès	1983	current	Weekly	ISSN 1047-1405; LCCN sn8902293; OCLC 20621018	Official site; In Haitian Creole, English and French.
Brooklyn	The Network Journal	1991?		Monthly	OCLC 29329685	Edited by Njeru Waithaka.
Brooklyn	The New York Beacon; Big Red News (1976–1993)	1976	current	Weekly	ISSN 0745-936X; LCCN 2009263177, sn97063663; OCLC 44903315, 28188945	Official site; Edited by Michael V. O’Neal and published by Walter Smith Jr.; Circulation of 24,000.
Brooklyn	New York Recorder	1953	1987	Weekly	LCCN sn84024872; OCLC 11279250	Published by Thomas H. Watkins.
Brooklyn	Our Time Press	1996	current	Monthly	OCLC 37566221	Official site
Brooklyn	Brooklyn Trend	1987	?	Monthly	OCLC 19407726	
Brooklyn	The Brooklyn Voice	1939	?	Weekly		
Manhattan	Carib News / The New York Carib News: the Weekly Voice of the Caribbean-American Community	1983	current	Weekly	ISSN 0745-8428; LCCN sn900401; OCLC 18335474	Official site; Circulation of 15,000.
Manhattan	Freedom	1950	1955	Monthly	OCLC 6512187, 18293472	Published by Freedom Associates
Manhattan	Freedom's Journal	1827	1829	Weekly	LCCN 00252901, sn83030455; OCLC 44724199, 1570144	
Manhattan	The Harlem Advocate	1996		Monthly		
Manhattan	The Harlem Bulletin	1937?	?	Weekly		Edited by Columbus A. Austin.
Manhattan	Harlem Chronicle	1938	?	Twice monthly		
Manhattan	The Harlem Daily	1965	?	Daily, Monday through Friday	LCCN 2012254016; OCLC 770747938, 30762633	Published by Clyde H. Reid. Edited by Greg Harris.
Manhattan	Harlem Democrat	1949	?	Unknown		Published by The Independent Democrats.
Manhattan	Harlem Evening Star	1928?	?	Three times a week		Published by MacDonald McLean Publishing Company, Inc.
Manhattan	Harlem Heights Daily Citizen	1933	1934	Daily (except Sunday)	LCCN sn93062821, sn94088873; OCLC 27319294, 33030593	
Manhattan	Harlem Home Journal	1928?	?	Weekly		
Manhattan	Harlem News	1967	1971	Monthly	LCCN sn87073037, sn94083335; OCLC 16349532, 32325047	
Manhattan	The Harlem Overheard	1996	?	Quarterly newspaper	OCLC 37502870	
Manhattan	Harlem Reporter	1930	?	Weekly		Edited by G. W. Abott.
Manhattan	Harlem Resident Community News / Harlem Community News	1996	current	Biweekly	OCLC 36979146	Official site; Edited by Denise Carroll. Published by Pat Stevenson.
Manhattan	Harlem Weekly	1980?	?	Weekly	OCLC 33107890	
Manhattan	Harlem Youth Speaks	1970s	?		LCCN sn97047998; OCLC 36950667	
Manhattan	Manhattan Tribune	1968	1973?	Weekly	LCCN sn83030578; OCLC 12061694, 17271751, 2236816	
Manhattan	The Negro Liberator / Harlem Liberator (1933–1934)	1933	1935	Weekly or twice monthly	LCCN sn91069851, sn91074710; OCLC 17271299, 17267276, 7354750, 28355515, 24957923	
Manhattan	The New American / Black American	1972	?	Weekly	ISSN 0890-5983; LCCN sn86011832, sn94082698, sn92028132; OCLC 21399164, 32411924, 12626278	Published by Carl Offord.
Manhattan	The New York News and Harlem Home Journal	1914?	?	Weekly	LCCN sn88063292; OCLC 17758556	
Manhattan	Uptown: The Voice of Central Harlem	1979	?	10 times per year or monthly	LCCN sn94093093, sn92060445; OCLC 32794340, 25800167	Founded and published by Helen Brodie Baldwin.
New York	Mr. Muhammad Speaks	1960	1961	Monthly newspaper	LCCN sn93062851; OCLC 27580288	
New York	People's Community News	1970	1900s	Weekly	ISSN 2643-2153, 2643-2161; LCCN 2014254017, sn94024807; OCLC 664611342, 31638700	
	The Pine And Palm	1861	1861	Weekly	LCCN 2017225065; OCLC 607389373	Published simultaneously in New York and Boston.; Promoted emigration to Haiti.
New York	Africa and World News	1977	1978?	Weekly	LCCN sn94053336; OCLC 31357316	Edited by D. C. Aharanwa.; Billed as “[t]he first African paper printed in New York.”
New York	African News & Views	1959	?	Irregular	OCLC 32639908	
Manhattan	The African Sun Times	1996	?	Twice monthly	OCLC 34795079	Edited and published by Chika A. Onyeani.
New York	The New York Age / New York Age Defender (1953–1957)	1887	1960	Weekly	LCCN sn83030005, sn85042496, sn85042495; OCLC 9274417, 1586054, 10829363, 12572890, 10821926	
New York	Alternatives	1973	?	Irregular	LCCN sn93062884, sn94083770; OCLC 27903808, 32342960	
New York	The American Recorder	1928	?	Weekly		
New York	The American West Indian News	1928	?	Weekly		
New York	New York Amsterdam News / Amsterdam News	1909	1941	Weekly	ISSN 0028-7121; LCCN sn86058065, sn7805580; OCLC 13404942, 1586884	Published by Powell-Savory Corp.
New York	New York Amsterdam News	1943	current	Weekly	LCCN sn83030330, sn85042678; OCLC 9480575, 12774267	Official site
New York	New York Amsterdam Star-News	1941	1943	Weekly	LCCN sn85042675, sn85042676; OCLC 12774128, 12774060	Published by Powell-Savory Corp. Edited by C. B. Powell.
New York	The Anglo-African	1860s	1865	Weekly	LCCN sn87055554, sn94090624, sn94090626, 2017225067, sn84023392; OCLC 17199885, 32585080, 32585094, 999606202, 10855217	
New York	The Business Journal	1922?	?	Twice a month		
New York	The Business World	1921	?	Weekly		
New York	Calvin's Newspaper Service	1935	?	Weekly		Published and edited by Floyd J. Calvin.
New York	Caribbean Echo	1969	1970	Weekly	LCCN sn89070003; OCLC 19059691	Published by Caribbean Enterprises Inc.
New York	Champion	1943	?	Monthly		Published by Harlem Labor Union, Inc. Edited by V. Ollivierre.
New York	New York Citizen-Call	1960	1961	Weekly	LCCN sn87073039; OCLC 16349605	
New York	The City Sun	1984	1996	Weekly	ISSN 8750-2720; LCCN sn84027045; OCLC 10868443	Published by City Sun Pub. Co.
New York	The Colored American	1837	1842	Weekly	LCCN sn94084009, 2017225073, sn83030314; OCLC 9858717, 707405582, 2259552, 9805590	
New York	Connection: All African Community Newsweekly	1987	?	Weekly	OCLC 32980785	Published by Kwasi S. Scipio-Okpabla.
New York	New York Courier	1961	1971	Weekly	LCCN sn88063137; OCLC 17634562	
New York	The Crusader	1853	1854	Weekly	LCCN sn94055940; OCLC 31491872	
New York	Daily Journal	2001	?	Daily (except Saturday and Sunday)	ISSN 1536-7762; LCCN 2001215539; OCLC 47799051	
New York	The Daily Star	1921	?	Daily		Edited by Arthur V. Craig.
New York	The Dunbar News	1929	?	Biweekly		Attested through at least 1934.
New York	El Mulato	1854	?	Weekly or biweekly	LCCN 2016238235; OCLC 664615783, 31765474	In Spanish.
New York	Ethiopian World	1934	?	Weekly	LCCN sn84037005; OCLC 10575062	
New York	New York Evening Express	1955	?	Daily		Published by William L. Watkins Jr.
New York	New York Freeman	1884	1887	Weekly	LCCN 2013254343, sn83027102; OCLC 662796872, 10126322, 2937970, 10126348	Published and edited by Timothy Thomas Fortune.
New York	The New York Globe	1880	1884	Weekly	LCCN 2013254345, sn83027106; OCLC 662788640, 10154100, 28463040	Edited by Timothy Thomas Fortune. Published by George Parker & Co.; Supersedes Rumor and superseded by the New York Freeman.
New York	The Home Journal News	1933	1900s	Weekly	LCCN sn93062822; OCLC 27319304	Extant through at least 1937.
New York	The Hotel Tattler	1922	1924	Weekly	LCCN sn94087425, sn88073079; OCLC 32375759, 18801223	
New York	In-formation: Black Revolutionary Newspaper	1965?	?	Unknown	LCCN sn94023523; OCLC 30107147	
New York	The Inter-State Tattler	1925	?	Weekly	LCCN sn88073081, sn94087427; OCLC 18801209, 32375779	
New York	Kontact	1932	1900s	Irregular	LCCN sn92060451, sn94086226; OCLC 27085691, 32324823	Official organ of the Liberian Knights of Industry.
New York	Liberator	1996		Weekly		Edited by William Pleasant.
New York	The Liberator	1929	1932	Weekly	LCCN sn87090098; OCLC 15502927	
New York	The Light: A Journal of Opinion, Information, Inspiration, Education	1927	?	Twice monthly		Published and edited by A. McDonald Ifill.
New York	Lincoln News	1929	?	Weekly		
New York	Metro Exchange	1988?	?	Monthly	OCLC 32980742	Edited by Lori Thompson Reid.
New York	National Negro News	1938?	?	Unknown		Published and edited by J.J. Allen.
New York	National New York Amsterdam News	1949	1900s	Weekly	LCCN sn85042679; OCLC 12774326	Published by Powell-Savory Corp.
New York	National News	1932	1932	Weekly	LCCN sn88063377; OCLC 18314307	Edited by George S. Schuyler.
New York	The Negro Champion	1928	1929	Weekly	LCCN 2012218503; OCLC 590631040	"Official organ of and published by the American Negro Labor Congress."
New York	The Negro Times / Daily Negro Times	1920s	?	Daily	LCCN sn93052579; OCLC 28662571	Attested from at least 1923.
New York	The Negro World	1917	1933	Biweekly	LCCN sn84037003; OCLC 19538510, 6688993, 13913248, 10575221	Edited by Marcus Garvey from 1923 to 1932, and M.L.T. DeMena from 1932 to 1933.; Had Spanish language section.
New York	The New African Observer	1981	?	Quarterly newspaper		Published by G. Louverture Catus.
New York	New York Dispatch	1920?	?	Weekly		Edited by J.L. Jackson.
New York	The Paper	1970	?	Monthly newspaper	LCCN sn2007059050; OCLC 31945133	
New York	The People's Voice	1942	1948	Weekly	LCCN 2019254368, sn84031138; OCLC 1119557625, 10870853	
New York	Pictorial News	1921	?	Weekly		Edited by C. Ben Curley.
New York	The Progressive American	1871	1880s	Weekly	LCCN sn85026600; OCLC 12293057	Edited by John J. Freeman.
New York	The Ram's Horn	1847	1848	Weekly	LCCN sn84025829; OCLC 10372036, 7250661	
New York	The Reporter	1935	1937?	Weekly	LCCN sn89070006, sn94087278; OCLC 19059659, 32374987	Published during the employees' strike against the Amsterdam News.
New York	The Rights of All	1829	1830	Monthly	LCCN 2014254303, sn83027094; OCLC 607390733, 10000851, 2809476	
New York	Rumor	1880	1880	Weekly		Published by George Parker & Co.
New York	New York Star & Amsterdam News	1941	1941	Weekly	ISSN 2641-127X; LCCN sn85042675; OCLC 12774060	Formed by merger of New York Amsterdam News and New Jersey Star.
New York	New York State Contender	1930?	?	Weekly		
New York	The Suffragist	1880	?	Weekly	LCCN sn94082945; OCLC 19333181	Published and edited by J.W.A. Shaw.
New York	The Tattler	1924	1920s	Weekly	LCCN sn94087426, sn88073080; OCLC 32375772, 18801240	
New York	The Union	1876	1890s	Weekly	LCCN sn83031031; OCLC 9749003	Edited and published by Charles Henry Bauer.
New York	The Unique Advertiser	1904?	?	Weekly		Edited by J. R. Pedro.
New York	Weekly Advocate	1837	1837	Weekly	LCCN 2017225072, sn83030315; OCLC 524517324, 9460991	
New York	The Weekly Anglo-African	1859	1862	Weekly	LCCN 2017225064, sn83030179, 2017225066, sn94090625, sn84023391; OCLC 794288668, 9370610, 607392488, 32585086, 10855160, 2773967	Numbering restarted with vol. 1, no. 1 on July 27, 1861.; Published and edited by Thomas Hamilton.
New York	The West Indian Times and American Review	1928	?	Weekly		Edited by Samuel Manning.
New York	Woman's Echo	1948?	?	Monthly		Edited by Wittie Anna Biggins.
New York	World Echo / World Peace Echo	1934	1934	Weekly	LCCN sn84037004; OCLC 10575045	
New York	World Health	1936	1937	Weekly	LCCN sn94090657; OCLC 32591782	Published by A. Honaeel.
Queens, New York (Jamaica)	Beton Arme	1994	?	Biweekly	OCLC 30771861	50% in French.; Published by Patrick Xavier.
Queens, New York (Jamaica)	Brooklyn Informer	1920	?	Weekly		Edited by William S. McKinney Jr.
Queens, New York (Jamaica)	The Jamaican Gleaner	1940	?	Biweekly		
Queens, New York (Jamaica)	Long Island Review	1937	?	Twice monthly		
Queens, New York (Jamaica)	Long Island Star	1953	?	Weekly	LCCN sn93062825, sn94081628; OCLC 27319441, 32229798	
Queens, New York (Jamaica)	New Voice Of New York, Inc	1999	?	Weekly	ISSN 1538-3024; LCCN sn2001061928; OCLC 40930099	Official site
Queens, New York (Jamaica)	The New York Page	1984	?	Irregular	LCCN sn2007059038; OCLC 55151995	
Queens, New York (Jamaica)	The New York Voice	1971	?	Weekly	LCCN sn94093011, sn84031332; OCLC 33390279, 10975737	
Queens, New York (Jamaica)	The Queens Voice	1959	1970	Weekly	LCCN sn84024320; OCLC 11171622	
Queens, New York (Jamaica)	The Voice	1970	1971	Weekly	LCCN sn84031046; OCLC 11168124	
Queens, New York (Jamaica)	The Weekly Gleaner	1976?		Weekly	ISSN 1018-2330; OCLC 29736292	
Queens, New York (Jamaica)	Weekly Star	1995?	?	Weekly	ISSN 1018-2330; OCLC 38274502	Published by Gleaner Publishing Company.
Queens (Corona)	Enspire	1996		Monthly		
Queens (Fresh Meadows / Jamaica (1968–1981) / Flushing)	New York Voice, Inc. Harlem USA	1958	1990s	Weekly or biweekly	ISSN 0042-8051; LCCN sn84024320, sn84031046, sn84031332; OCLC 2659604, 10975737, 11168124, 11171622	
Staten Island	The Black Agenda	1900s	?	Monthly newspaper	LCCN sn2001061931; OCLC 46868320	Attested through at least 2001.
Staten Island	The Staten Island Black Press	1979	?	Unknown		
Staten Island	The Black Reign Community Newspaper	1996	?	Biweekly	LCCN sn2001061946, sn2001061945; OCLC 39497011, 37146063	

== See also ==
- List of African American newspapers and media outlets
- List of African American newspapers in Connecticut
- List of African American newspapers in Massachusetts
- List of African American newspapers in New Jersey
- List of African American newspapers in Pennsylvania
- List of newspapers in New York

== Works cited ==
- Danky, James Philip; Hady, Maureen E., eds. (1998). African-American newspapers and periodicals : a national bibliography. Harvard University Press. ISBN 9780674007888.
- Ford, Angela; McFall, Kevin; Dabney, Bob (February 2019). "African American Media Today: Building The Future From The Past" (PDF). Democracy Fund.
- Smith, Jessie Carney (2012). Black Firsts: 4,000 Ground-Breaking and Pioneering Historical Events. Visible Ink Press. ISBN 9781578593699.
- Smith, Jessie Carney; Horton, Carrell Peterson, eds. (1995). Historical Statistics of Black America: Media to Vital Statistics. Gale Research. ISBN 0810393921.
