= List of African American newspapers in Delaware =

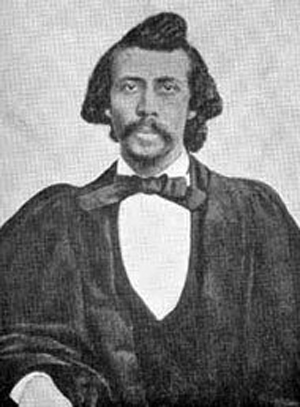
William Howard Day, editor of Our National Progress.

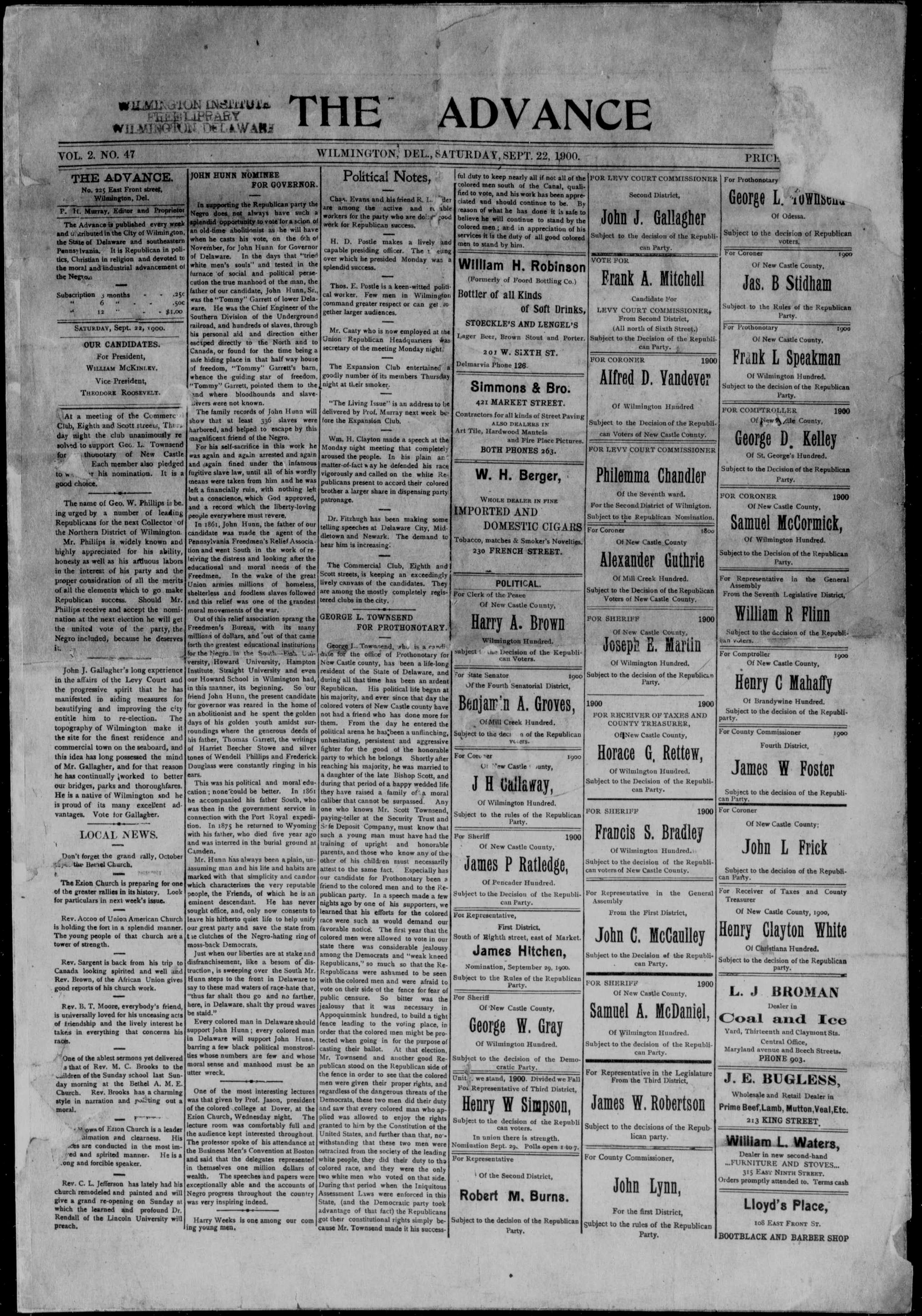
Front page of The Advance of Wilmington from September 22, 1900, with endorsements in national, state and local races.

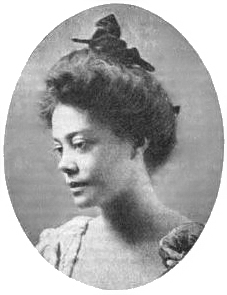
Alice Dunbar Nelson, co-owner and publisher of the Wilmington Advocate.

This is a list of African American newspapers that have been published in the state of Delaware. It includes both current and historical newspapers.

The first known African American newspaper published in Delaware was Our National Progress, which from 1869 to 1875 was published simultaneously in Wilmington and other cities in the Mid-Atlantic states, and was "viewed by some as the only national Black paper in the corridor between Washington and New York." Other notable Delaware papers include The Advance (1899–1901), and the Wilmington Advocate, which noted poet and journalist Alice Dunbar Nelson operated from 1920 to 1922.

The majority of such newspapers have been published in Wilmington, the state's capital. However, for much of its history Wilmington's African American population was too small to support even one such newspaper at a time. Irvine Garland Penn, who tabulated the African American newspapers in circulation in 1880 and 1890 in The Afro-American Press and Its Editors, did not list a single Delaware newspaper for either year. For much of the late 19th and early 20th centuries when no African American paper operated, news of the community was shared in a column in one of Wilmington's white weeklies, the Sunday Morning Star.

== Newspapers ==
City	Title	Beginning	End	Frequency	Call numbers	Remarks
Dover	People's Beacon	1945	?	Irregular	LCCN sn88053145; OCLC 18868801	Published by the Delaware People's League.
New Castle	Delaware Observer	1968	1988?	Monthly newspaper	LCCN sn88053124; OCLC 18785990	
New Castle	North Star	1981	?	Monthly		
Wilmington	The Advance	1899	1901	Weekly	ISSN 2637-8213, 2637-8205; LCCN 2014254333, sn86058063; OCLC 879705302, 13353313	Free online archive
Wilmington	Wilmington Advocate	1920	1922	Weekly		Published by Alice Dunbar Nelson and husband Robert Nelson.; No known copies survive, although some printing plates do.
Wilmington	Arrow	1958	1960?	Monthly newspaper	LCCN sn88053094; OCLC 18302146	
Wilmington	The Defender (1965–1967) / The Delaware Defender (1962–1965) / The Delaware Valley Defender (1967–1980s)	1962	1985?	Weekly	The Delaware Defender: LCCN sn88053027; OCLC 17742854; The Defender: LCCN sn88053028; OCLC 17742994; The Delaware Valley Defender: LCCN sn88053134; OCLC 18784587	
Wilmington	The Delaware Reporter	1940	?	Weekly	LCCN sn88053110; OCLC 18801770	Published by J. Alexis DuBois.; Billed as “Delaware’s only Negro newspaper.”
Wilmington	The Delaware Spectator	1972	1976	Weekly	LCCN sn87054000; OCLC 17247954	Approximately 10% in Spanish.
Wilmington	The Delaware Star (1976–1978) / The Delaware Valley Star (1978–1984)	1976	1984	Monthly 1976–1978; biweekly, 1978–1980; weekly, 1980–1984		Delaware Star: LCCN sn88053030; OCLC 17742879; Delaware Valley Star: LCCN sn89099207; OCLC 19233230
Wilmington	Focus	1930	?	Weekly		Billed as “Delaware’s only Negro newspaper.”
Wilmington	Front Page	1944	?	Weekly	LCCN sn88053112; OCLC 18801764	
Wilmington	Wilmington Herald Times	1941	?	Weekly	LCCN sn88053136; OCLC 18785987	
Wilmington	Our National Progress	1869	1875?	Weekly	LCCN sn83032133; OCLC 10213663	Published by C.M.Brown.; Edited starting in 1870 by William H. Day.; One issue survives.
Wilmington	The People’s Pulse	1968	1970	Monthly	LCCN sn88053032; OCLC 17742923	Published by Peoples Settlement Association & United Neighbors for Progress Publications.
Wilmington	The Sower: A Christian Newspaper	1984	?	Monthly newspaper		Published and edited by Ralph Morris.
Wilmington	Twilight	1890s		Weekly		

== See also ==
- List of African American newspapers and media outlets
- List of African American newspapers in Maryland
- List of African American newspapers in New Jersey
- List of African American newspapers in Pennsylvania
- List of newspapers in Delaware

== Works cited ==
- Dalleo, Peter T. (2014). "African American Abolitionist and Kinship Connections in Nineteenth-Century Delaware, Canada West, and Liberia". In De B’Béri, Boulou Ebanda; Reid-Maroney, Nina; Wright, Handel Kashope (eds.). The Promised Land: History and Historiography of the Black Experience in Chatham-Kent's Settlements and Beyond. University of Toronto Press. pp. 149–175. ISBN 9781442615335. JSTOR 10.3138/j.ctt6wrgjz.
- Danky, James Philip; Hady, Maureen E., eds. (1998). African-American newspapers and periodicals : a national bibliography. Harvard University Press. ISBN 9780674007888.
- Patton, Venetria K.; Honey, Maureen, eds. (2001). "Alice Dunbar-Nelson (1875-1935)". Double-take: A Revisionist Harlem Renaissance Anthology. Rutgers University Press. ISBN 9780813529301.
- Penn, Irvine Garland (1891). The Afro-American Press and Its Editors. Willey & Company.
