= @HopeMob =

Not for profit crowdfunding site

@HopeMob was a not-for-profit crowdfunding site that raised money for direct aid to worthy causes. It was co-founded by Shaun King and Chad Kellough in 2012. People with specific needs applied to the site and were vetted. The vetting included asking for references, conducting interviews, and researching on social media. Support was then given to approved projects to help them present a compelling case. Funds were raised and used to purchase the specific items people needed, such as a medical procedure; money was not given directly to those raising funds.

== Model ==
HopeMob was designed to be a crowdfunding platform meant to unite people and give hope to the others. The idea was to connect the ones in need with a group that had the assets to help them. Every user was able to submit a story about who a person in need, which then had to go through a verification process. Afterwards, they were put up for a vote by the site's community. Each vote required giving points that were given by doing certain actions (signing up, donating, using social media), and the revenue was supposed to help the HopeMob's operations. The story that had the majority of votes was featured on the front page. The @HopeMob Advisory Board selected four campaigns to feature each funding cycle and funds from monthly donors were dispersed accordingly.

== History ==
HopeMob.org initially raised funds to build their platform in January 2012 on the crowdfunding site Kickstarter. Their campaign raised about $125,000 and was actively backed by Oprah Winfrey. The site was launched in April 2012. The initial site featured one cause at a time and charged a fee as a percentage of funds raised to cover its costs.

In December 2012, the site relaunched as a not-for-profit. Money was provided to the site by donors to cover the site's expenses, allowing the site to provide 100% of the funds raised in the crowdfunding campaigns to support the projects. The site also opened up to running multiple campaigns at the same time.

Co-founder Shaun King left the organization in 2014 to pursue other projects.

After King departed HopeMob.org in 2014, the HopeMob Advisory Board asked Pure Charity to step in and help transition current initiatives into completed initiatives, as well as to envision a larger work for HopeMob and its future. HopeMob was rebranded @HopeMob and was brought under the leadership of Leroy Barber, co-founder of the Voices Project. Under Barber, @HopeMob took on a completely new advisory board and mission, becoming the world's first crowdfunding site devoted exclusively to supporting leaders and communities of color in dismantling the consequences of systemic racism and injustice.

== Criticism ==
According to Shaun King, HopeMob was criticized by people who raised money but never received the funds. In response, HopeMob stated that it paid out for every story that raised money.
