= List of African American newspapers in Connecticut =

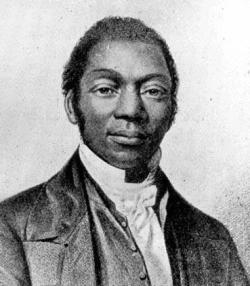
James W.C. Pennington, who published The Clarksonian in the 1840s.

This is a list of African-American newspapers that have been published in Connecticut. It includes both current and historical newspapers.

Connecticut's first newspaper by and for African Americans was The Clarksonian, published from 1843 to 1844 in Hartford. The first known paper after that came much later, however, with the Hartford Herald in 1918. Connecticut's African American community has also historically been served by papers from neighboring states such as Massachusetts.

African-American newspapers in Connecticut today include the Inner-City News of New Haven and the Inquiring News of Hartford (successor to the Inquirer family of newspapers in Bridgeport, Hartford, New Haven, and Waterbury).

== Newspapers ==
City	Title	Beginning	End	Frequency	Call numbers	Remarks
Bridgeport	Afri-Voice Review (1991–) / Afro-Voice Review (1988–1991)	1988	1992?	Unknown	LCCN sn94053124, sn94053125; OCLC 30675511, 30675663	
Bridgeport	Harambee Union / Harambee	1969	1976	Monthly newspaper	LCCN sn94053122, sn94053123; OCLC 30675183, 30675295	Partially in Spanish.
Bridgeport / Hartford	The Bridgeport Inquirer	1977?	2006	Weekly		Merged into Inquiring News.
Hamden	The Elm City Trader	1991	1990s	Weekly	LCCN sn95063169; OCLC 33419197	
Hartford	The Clarksonian	1843	1844	Monthly newspaper		Founded and edited by James W.C. Pennington.
Hartford	Connecticut Chronicle / Hartford Chronicle / Hartford-Springfield Chronicle	1915	1949?	Weekly	ISSN 2642-7117, 2642-7109; LCCN sn95063011, sn92051342, sn92051345; OCLC 31813207, 26273304, 26273329	Free online archives: Connecticut Chronicle; Hartford Chronicle; Published by George W. Goodman.
Hartford	Hartford Herald	1918			No issues survive.	
Hartford	The Informer	1977	?	Weekly	LCCN sn92051470; OCLC 26787735	Published by Robert Hales
Hartford	The Hartford Inquirer	1975	2006	Weekly	LCCN sn89080095, sn94092715; OCLC 23588659, 32784796	Merged with other Inquirer papers to form Inquiring News.; Edited and published by William R. Hales.
Hartford	The New Haven Inquirer	1976	?	Weekly	LCCN sn94093004, sn92060556; OCLC 33390392, 26502871	
Hartford	Inquiring News	2006	current			Official site
Hartford	New England Bulletin	1949	?	Weekly	ISSN 2643-5012, 2643-5004; LCCN 2019271081, sn92051343; OCLC 1099565978, 26273342	Free online archive
Hartford	North Hartford Truth	1971	1974?	Monthly	OCLC 26787570	Published by Horace Bushnell Church.
Hartford	Northend Agent's	1974 or 1975	current	Weekly	LCCN sn92051380; OCLC 26498043	Official site; Edited until 2015 by John Robert Allen.
Hartford	Springfield Inquirer	1981?	?	Weekly		
Hartford / Springfield	Hartford Star	1969	1974	Weekly	LCCN sn92051308; OCLC 26205865	Edited by Henry Morris.
Hartford / Springfield	The Hartford Voice	1974	1975	Weekly	LCCN sn92051331; OCLC 26205881	Successor to the Hartford Star.
New Haven	The Crow / The Heritage Hall Crow	1968	?	Twice monthly or biweekly	The Crow: LCCN sn94053269; OCLC 31177268; Heritage Hall Crow: LCCN sn95063093; OCLC 32334099	
New Haven	Black Coalition Weekly / The Greater New Haven Black Coalition Weekly (1972)	1972	1900s	Weekly	ISSN 2638-3756; LCCN sn95063100; OCLC 32981870	
New Haven	The Inner-City News / The Inner-City	1980s	current	Monthly newspaper	LCCN sn95063181; OCLC 33438306	Free online archive; Only member of the National Newspaper Publishers Association in Connecticut.; Estimated readership of 50,000 in 2003.; Subject of a controversy over a sponsored content deal with Yale University in 2003.
New Haven	New Haven Local News	1987	1990	Twice monthly	LCCN sn95063170; OCLC 33419288	Published by Willie Williams, Jr.
New Haven	The Open Gate News	1961	?	Twice-monthly or bimonthly	LCCN sn94053277; OCLC 31183560	Edited by Jeff Dyous.; Extant through at least 1962.
Waterbury	Black Voice	1970	1970s		LCCN sn94053381; OCLC 31747273	
Waterbury	People's Weekly	1972	1900s	Monthly newspaper	LCCN sn94053426; OCLC 31508193	Published by the Center for Black Development.

== See also ==
- List of African-American newspapers and media outlets
- List of African-American newspapers in Massachusetts
- List of African-American newspapers in New York
- List of African-American newspapers in Rhode Island
- List of newspapers in Connecticut

== Works cited ==
- Danky, James Philip; Hady, Maureen E., eds. (1998). African-American newspapers and periodicals : a national bibliography. Harvard University Press. ISBN 9780674007888.
- Pride, Armistead Scott; Wilson, Clint C. (1997). A History of the Black Press. Howard University Press. ISBN 9780882581927.
- Smith, Jessie Carney (2012). Black Firsts: 4,000 Ground-Breaking and Pioneering Historical Events. Visible Ink Press. ISBN 9781578593699.
