= The Mystery (newspaper) =

Historical African American newspaper

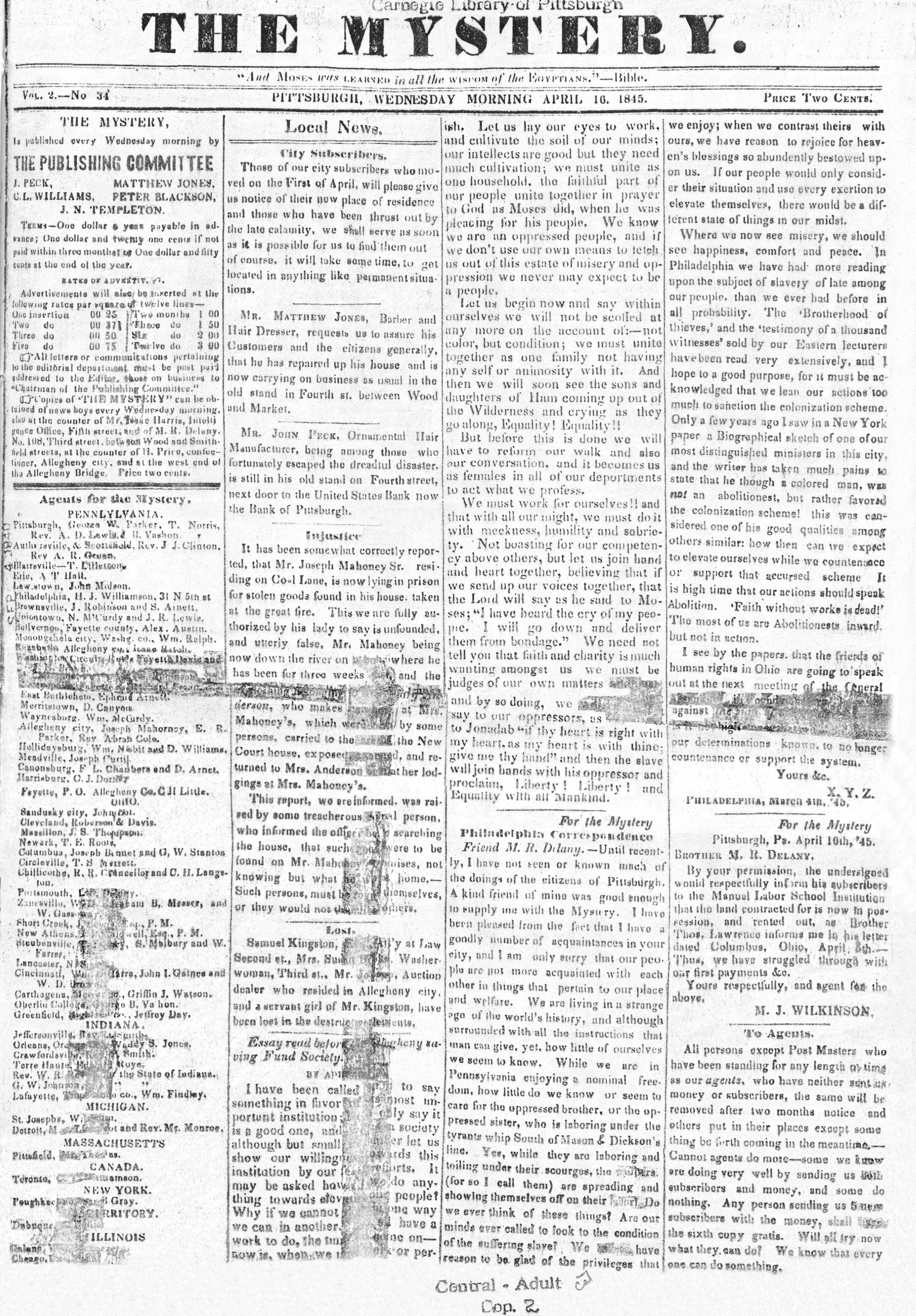
Issue of April 16, 1845

The Mystery (or the Pittsburgh Mystery) was a Pennsylvanian African American newspaper founded in 1843 by Martin Delany, a black activist and physician. It was a paper centered on the abolitionist movement, and attempted to foster feelings of pride in black life and culture, including black spiritual life. Delany left the paper in 1847 to work at another African American newspaper, the North Star. The paper either died that year, or it was purchased by the African Methodist Episcopal Church. If it was purchased, it survives today as the Christian Recorder.

== Publication ==
The Mystery (also known as the Pittsburgh Mystery) was founded in 1843 in Pittsburgh by Martin Delany, a black activist and physician, two years after a conference for free people of color in the city. He was the editor and principal contributor to all of its issues, which were printed with a Biblical quotation: "And Moses was learned in all the wisdom of the Egyptians". The title was a reference to its mission of, as historian Tunde Adeleke says, "enlighten[ing] blacks on the 'mystery' of their condition—i.e., means of elevation".

The paper was made of four pages, and its main focus was abolitionism (the eradication of slavery) and the celebration of black life and culture, including black spiritual life. It included news about developments in the abolitionist movement, coverage of events of interest to the black community, editorials—almost all written by Delany—and ads, including one advertisement for Delany's medical practice. The paper also supported developing pride in an ancestral connection to Africa. It was financially supported by Pittsburgh's black community, especially its women.

The Mystery's original reporting was reprinted in other abolitionist and black newspapers, including the Palladium of Liberty and the Liberator. Its reporting was more moderate than some of its competitors, including The Mirror of Liberty from New York.

Delany resigned financial control of The Mystery in 1844; the paper had trouble staying financially stable, and the group that took over was composed of black men from Pittsburgh. In 1846, the paper's motto changed from its Biblical quotation to "Hereditary bondsmen! Know ye not who would be free, themselves strike the blow?". Delany left the paper in 1847 to work with Frederick Douglass at the North Star, another African American newspaper.

At least one source, historian of African American studies James T. Campbell, says the paper died that year. If it did not, then it was purchased by the African Methodist Episcopal Church in 1848, rebranded around that time as the Christian Herald, and later rebranded again as the Christian Recorder, its current name. According to an 1848 article in Douglass and Delany's North Star, the first number of The Christian Herald was "issued from the office formerly of the Mystery, which establishment has been sold out to the Methodist Church Connexion." Delany died in 1885 after settling in North Carolina and aligning with its segregationist Democratic Party. By 1996, only three issues of the paper had been located.
