= Boston Chronicle (1915–1966 newspaper) =

The Boston Chronicle (1915–1966) was a newspaper in Boston, Massachusetts. It was founded by immigrants from the Caribbean and advocated for civil rights and against colonialism.

== History ==
Launched by immigrants from Jamaica, it promoted itself with the motto "Fearless and Uncompromising – Advocate of Justice, Rights, and Opportunities". In addition to boxing and baseball in the United States, its sports pages covered cricket games in parts of the British Empire.

It covered the Elaine massacre in Arkansas.

In 1929, the New York Age reprinted its coverage of biologist Ernest E. Just.

Thaddeus Kitchener, Alfred Haughton, Uriah Murray, and William Harrison were involved with the paper. Kitchener was the first "student of color" to graduate with a law degree from Suffolk Law (1913). Born in Jamaica, he was living in Roxbury by 1908. A scholarship is named for him. Houghton and Harrison were its editors. It had a rivalry with the Boston Guardian. In 2023, the Suffolk University Archives made available digital versions of the paper from 1932–1960.

Like the Amsterdam News, it reported on issues facing Blacks.

Square Deal Publishing Company, its publisher, launched the Hartford-Springfield Chronicle in 1940. The Hartford Chronicle and Connecticut Chronicle succeeded it. The publishing company also launched the Providence Chronicle in Rhode Island in 1939. It lasted until 1957. William Wiley edited it.

Brothers from the Hayes family in Roxbury worked at the paper.

== See also ==
- List of African American newspapers in Massachusetts
- West Indian Americans
- Monroe Trotter, founder of the Boston Guardian
