= List of African American newspapers in Massachusetts =

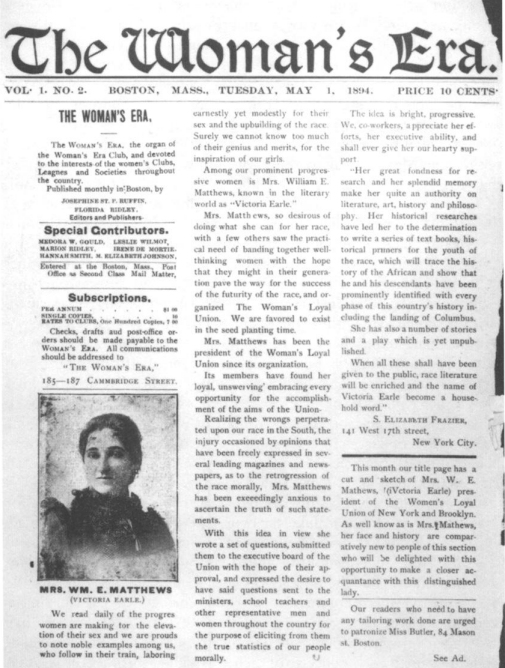
Front page of The Woman's Era, the first newspaper produced by and for African American women, from 1894.

This is a list of African American newspapers that have been published in the state of Massachusetts. It includes both current and historical newspapers.

The roots of the African American press are particularly deep in Massachusetts, dating back well before the Civil War. The first such newspaper in Massachusetts was the Anti-Slavery Herald in 1838. Notable African American newspapers in Massachusetts today include the Bay State Banner.

== Newspapers ==
| City | Title | Beginning | End | Frequency | Call numbers | Remarks |
|---|---|---|---|---|---|---|
| Boston | The Boston Advance | 1896 | 1907 | Weekly | LCCN 2011254255, sn84025816; OCLC 717486007, 10338032 | |
| Boston | Boston Advocate / The Boston Advocate | 1885 | 1887? | Weekly | LCCN sn91058048; OCLC 23710919 | Published by W. Grandison and J.B. Powell, Jr. |
| Boston | Anti-Slavery Herald | 1838 | 1838 | | | No copies survive.; Published by Benjamin F. Roberts, who later published the Self-Elevator. |
| Boston | Boston Chronicle | 1915 | 1966 | Weekly | LCCN sn86058056; OCLC 13285833 | Circulation of 5,000 in 1951. |
| Boston | The Boston Colored Citizen | 1903 | 1905? | Weekly | LCCN sn93059264; OCLC 27840644 | Published by Charles Alexander. |
| Boston | The Boston Courant | 1890 | 1902 | Weekly | LCCN 2011254256, sn84025817; OCLC 717486022, 2639755, 70337702 | |
| Boston | The Guardian | 1901 | 1960? | Weekly | LCCN sn94080255, sn83045863; OCLC 2642259, 9930768, 10838996, 10834942 | Edited by William Monroe Trotter to 1934, and by Maude Trotter Stewart thereafter.; Circulation of 10,000 in 1951. |
| Boston | The Hub | 1883 | 1885? | Weekly | | Edited by B.R. Wilson. |
| Boston | New England Black Weekly | 1980 | 1982 | Weekly | LCCN sn93059307; OCLC 28173754 | |
| Boston | Pine and Palm / The Pine and Palm | 1861 | 1862 or 1861 | Weekly | LCCN sn84023420, 2017225065; OCLC 10860438, 607389373 | Successor to the Weekly Anglo-African.; Promoted emigration to Haiti.; Published simultaneously in New York and Boston. |
| Boston | Boston Reliance | 1912 | 1910s | Weekly | LCCN sn92057047; OCLC 27182669 | Published simultaneously in Boston and Cambridge.; Extant through at least 1913. |
| Boston | The Self Elevator | 1853 | 1850s | Twice monthly | LCCN sn93059335; OCLC 28740084 | "Devoted to the subject of general elevation among the Colored People of the country."; Published by Benjamin F. Roberts. |
| Boston | Struggle | 1972? | ? | Monthly | OCLC 5072011 | |
| Boston | Boston Times / The Boston Times | 1943 | | Weekly | LCCN sn93062818, sn94081629; OCLC 27319256, 32229799 | Circulation of 12,000 in 1951. |
| Boston | Urban Beat | 1991? | ? | Biweekly | OCLC 32933377 | |
| Boston | The Woman's Era | 1890 | 1897 | Monthly newspaper | | Founded and edited by Josephine St. Pierre Ruffin.; First national publication by and for African American women.; Became the official newspaper of the National Association of Colored Women in 1895. |
| Brockton | Haiti 2004 | 1992? | ? | Monthly | OCLC 30719284 | Written in French, and catering to the Haitian-American community. |
| Dorchester / Roxbury (1965–1981) | Bay State Banner / The Bay State Banner | 1965 | current | Weekly | LCCN 2008242359, sn83045147; OCLC 244125663 | Official site |
| Roxbury | Rebellion News | 1960s | ? | Monthly newspaper | LCCN sn2001062021; OCLC 12090918 | Extant through at least 1968. |
| Springfield | The Bottom Line | 1984? | ? | Weekly | | Published by Samuel R. Bass. |
| Springfield | Hartford-Springfield Chronicle | 1940 | 1940s | Weekly | ISSN 2688-9102, 2688-9110; LCCN sn95063011, 2019271301; OCLC 31813207, 1119386134 | Available online |
| Springfield | Salt: Springfield Area Life and Times | 1971 | 1973? | Weekly | LCCN sn91057038; OCLC 23479812 | In English and Spanish. |

== See also ==
- List of African American newspapers and media outlets
- List of African American newspapers in Connecticut
- List of African American newspapers in New York
- List of African American newspapers in Rhode Island
- List of newspapers in Massachusetts

== Works cited ==
- Danky, James Philip; Hady, Maureen E., eds. (1998). African-American newspapers and periodicals : a national bibliography. Harvard University Press. ISBN 9780674007888.
- Price, George R. (2006). The Easton family of southeast Massachusetts: The dynamics surrounding five generations of human rights activism 1753--1935 (Ph.D. thesis). University of Montana.
- Pride, Armistead Scott; Wilson, Clint C. (1997). A History of the Black Press. Howard University Press. ISBN 9780882581927.
- Smith, Jessie Carney; Horton, Carrell Peterson, eds. (1995). Historical Statistics of Black America: Media to Vital Statistics. Gale Research. ISBN 0810393921.
- Streitmatter, Rodger (1996). "Josephine St. Pierre Ruffin: A Nineteenth-Century Journalist of Boston's Black Elite Class". In Porter, Susan L. (ed.). Women of the Commonwealth: Work, Family, and Social Change in Nineteenth-century Massachusetts. University of Massachusetts Press. ISBN 9781558490055.
