= Talman Building =

Historic building in Rochester, NY

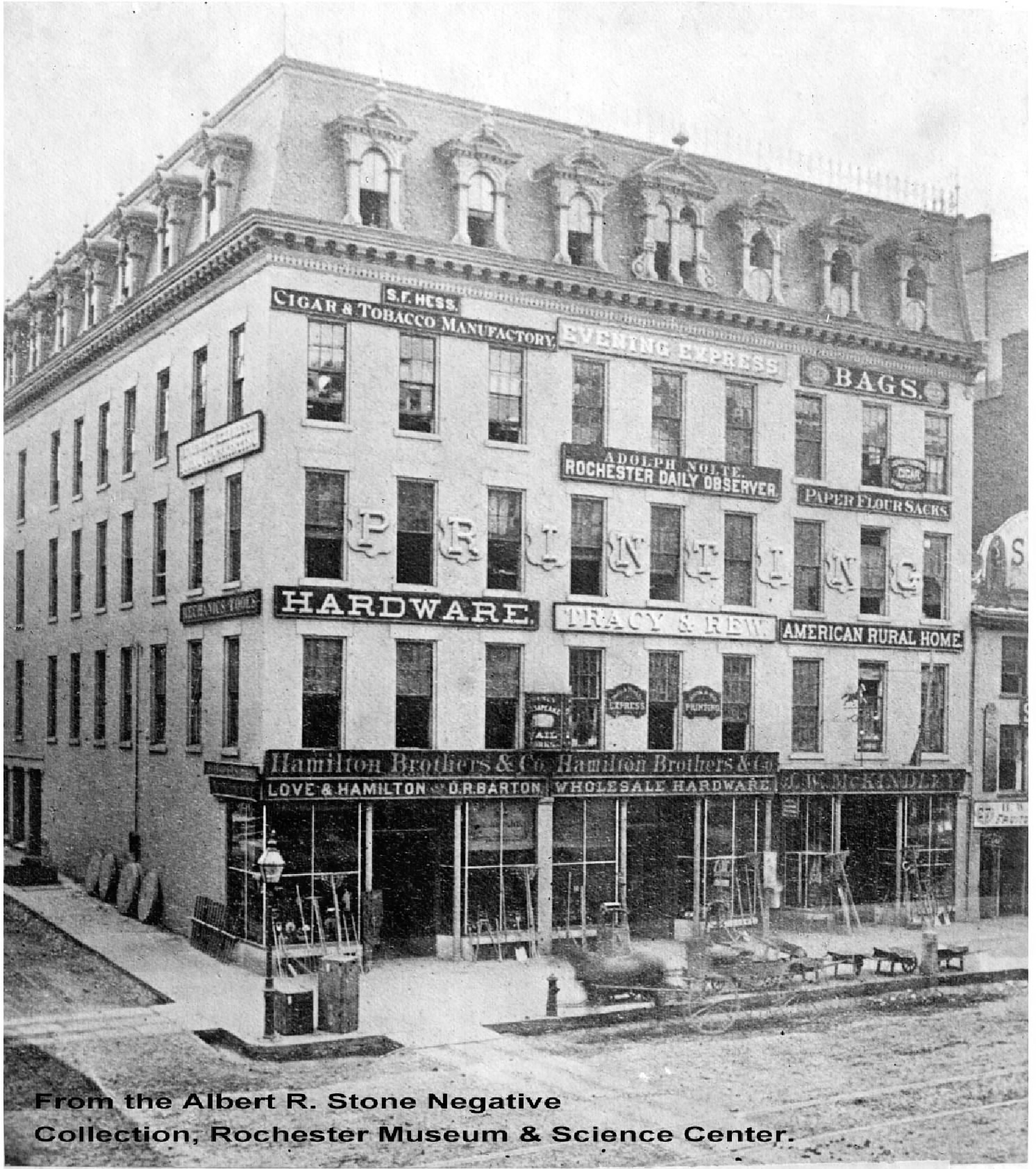
- The Talman Building in the 1870s.
- Interactive map of the Talman Building area

General information
- Location: 25 East Main Street, Rochester, New York, United States
- Coordinates: 43.1558798°N 77.6117288°W
- Current tenants: McConville Considine Cooman & Morin, P.C

The Talman Building is a historic site at 25 E. Main Street, Rochester, New York, used as an office by Frederick Douglass in editing and publishing the abolitionist journal, The North Star from 1847 to 1863.

It was also a stop on the Underground Railroad, and Douglass gave asylum to many traveling fugitives, of which at least one party was led by Harriet Tubman. It is named the Talman Building (also listed as the Talman Hall) after John T. Talman purchased the plot in 1839. The earliest known photograph of the Talman Building is one showing a celebration for the end of the Civil War. The "mansard roof", named after the chief architect of King Louis XIV, Jules Hardouin-Mansard, was added in 1866 and removed in 1915. Its modern appearance comes from its renovation in 1915, reflecting the “Chicago school” influence—one of functionality. The façade was added by the Central Bank of Rochester in 1922. The basement served as a fallout shelter during the Cold War.

== Current tenants ==
Current tenants include professional services companies, such as law firms and P22 (type foundry), a font-making company that uses historic printing equipment.
