= Shaun King =

American writer and civil-rights activist (born 1979)

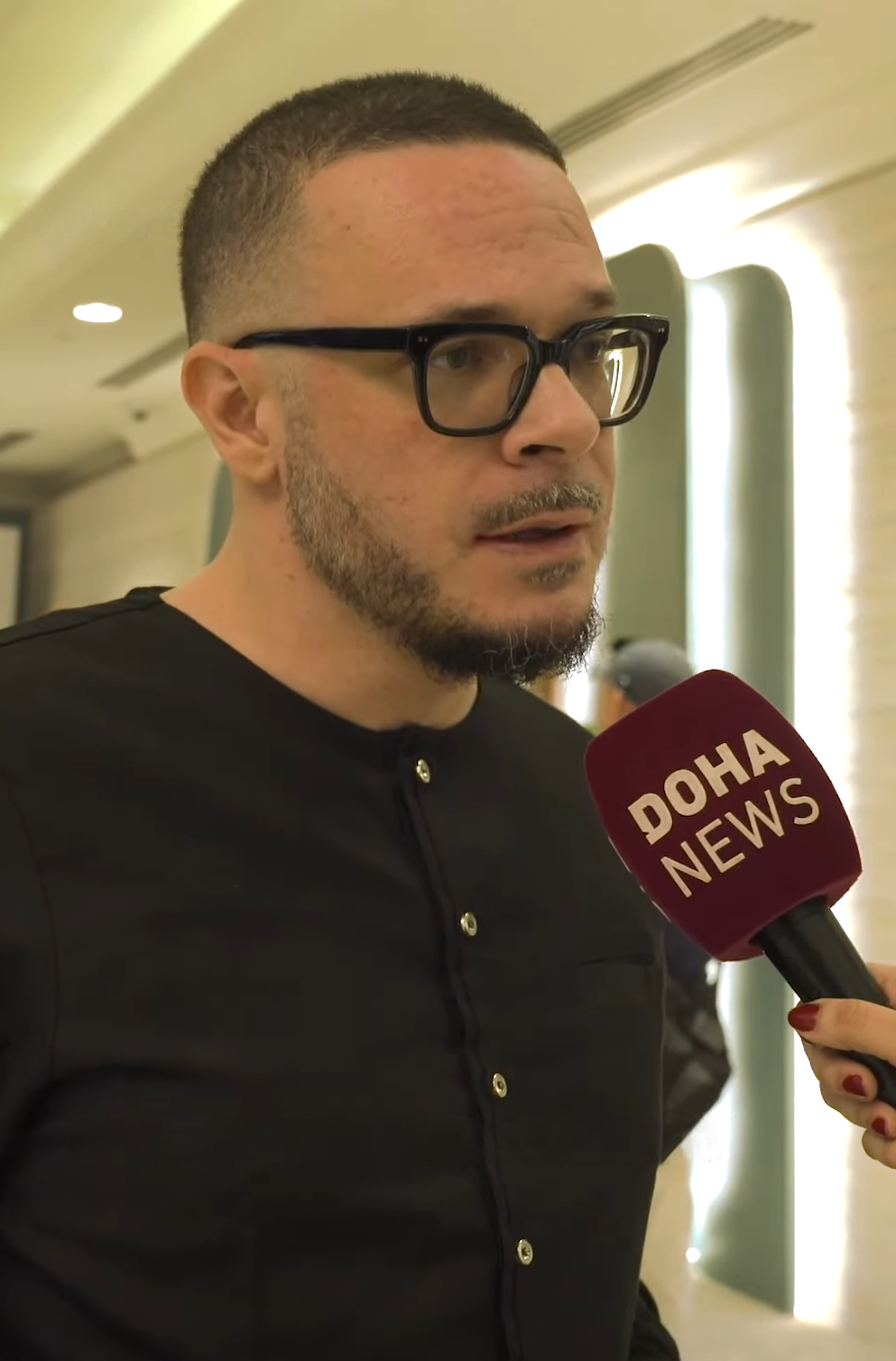
- King in 2023
- Born: Jeffery Shaun King; September 17, 1979 (age 47); Franklin County, Kentucky, U.S.
- Education: Morehouse College (BA); Arizona State University (MA)
- Occupations: Writer; activist; entrepreneur
- Political party: Independent (2016–present); Democratic (until 2016)
- Movement: Black Lives Matter
- Spouse: Rai King (m. 2001)
- Children: 5
- Website: shaunking.org

Jeffery Shaun King (born September 17, 1979) is an American writer and activist. As a writer, King has contributed to Daily Kos, New York Daily News, and The Young Turks. King co-founded the Real Justice PAC in 2018, launched the website The North Star in 2019, and co-founded the non-profit Grassroots Law Project in 2020.

On numerous occasions, King has faced accusations of fiscal mismanagement and of raising money from donors that does not reach its intended recipients. In addition, the Grassroots Law Project has been questioned for its high compensation paid to King and his associates, as well as its lack of progress on its main initiative. In 2023, King was involved in further controversy when he falsely claimed to have worked behind the scenes with Hamas and Qatar to secure the release of Israeli hostages during the Gaza war; the family of the released hostages said that he had "lied" and "fabricated his involvement."

== Early life and education ==
Jeffery Shaun King was born in Franklin, Kentucky and raised in Versailles, Kentucky. Although his birth certificate names Jeffery Wayne King, a white man, as his father, King stated in 2015 that his mother told him his actual biological father is a light-skinned black man. King's mother is Naomi Kay (Fleming) King, a white woman of Irish descent. By second grade, she raised King and his brother as a single parent. King attended Huntertown Elementary School and Woodford County High School.

King has stated that he was the victim of racism and hate crimes while growing up in Kentucky. He told reporters of a time that a pickup truck full of youths attempted to run him over with the vehicle on school property. King recalls that, after reporting the incident to school authorities, the youths were protected rather than punished. King later said that a second assault occurred, wherein "a dozen self-described 'rednecks'" beat him, and claimed the injuries caused him to miss a portion of two years of high school due to multiple spinal surgeries. King characterized the assault as a racially motivated hate crime. In 2015, media outlets questioned King's account of the assault, and, citing interviews with the investigating detective Keith Broughton and police reports on the case, characterized the fight as a one-on-one between King and another boy over a girl, where King sustained minor injuries. Broughton reportedly interviewed multiple witnesses, including a teacher who broke up the fight. A band teacher, two fellow students from King's high school, as well as King's wife, posted their recollection of the event to Facebook, backing King's account.

King attended Morehouse College, a private, historically black men's college in Atlanta, Georgia, where he majored in history. In 1999, King was elected president of the student government association. Midway through his education, he had to take a medical leave. Upon his return, he was named an Oprah Winfrey Scholar by Morehouse. In 2018, King earned a master's degree in history from Arizona State University.

== Career ==
After graduation, King was a high school civics teacher for about a year and then worked in Atlanta's juvenile justice system. King left teaching and worked as a pastor at Total Grace Christian Center in DeKalb County, Georgia.

King relates that he had been inspired to become a pastor when he was in high school; while King was recovering from injuries after an assault, he was regularly visited by his best friend's father, who was a pastor. He recalled growing up without a father figure and said, "I just found myself so impacted by this man coming to visit me that I wanted to be like him." In 2008, King founded a church in Atlanta called "Courageous Church". He made use of social media to recruit new members and was known as the "Facebook Pastor". In 2012, King resigned from the Courageous Church, citing personal stress and disillusionment.

=== Journalism ===
King has written extensively about his experiences as a biracial person, as well as the Black Lives Matter movement, which gained prominence during the events that followed the shooting of Michael Brown. Shaun wrote an article analyzing the Brown crime scene, and argued that the evidence suggested that officer Darren Wilson's life was not in danger during the shooting.

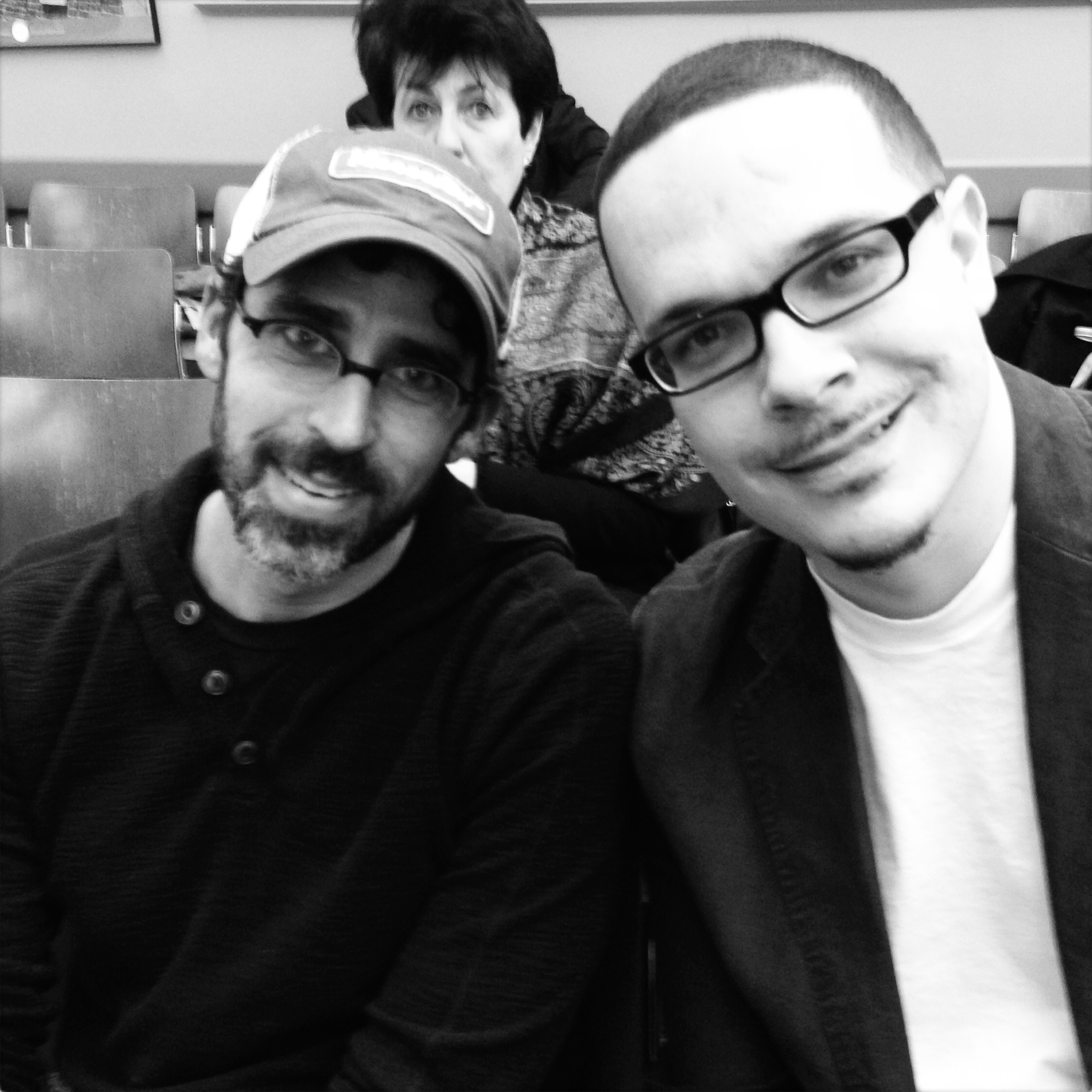
King with Crowdrise CEO Robert Wolfe (left) in 2013

King became a contributing blogger for the politically liberal website, the Daily Kos, in September 2014. On October 2, 2015, King joined the New York Daily News as a senior justice writer, where he focused on reporting and providing commentary on social justice, police brutality and race relations. On December 28, 2016, Cenk Uygur announced that King had been hired as a political commentator for The Young Turks. King left the Daily News in 2016.

In 2019, King launched the crowdfunded website The North Star, calling it an online "revival" of the anti-slavery newspaper of the same name, claiming that he had the support of the relatives of Frederick Douglass (the original paper's editor). The site has articles, podcast episodes, and videos for a subscription fee, with a focus on social justice issues, including police brutality and mass incarceration. The Daily Beast reported that the site did not deliver all the features that were promised during the fundraisers, such as a daily video broadcast and an app. King said he had been "overzealous" with the project, and that he should have listened to advisors who had told him that his plans for the site were too ambitious. After leaving The North Star, historian and former editor-in-chief Keisha Blain accused King via Twitter of being "a liar & a fraud", stating that she was prevented from saying as much because of a non-disclosure agreement. Another former employee claimed that they and others had to fight for months to receive the health care benefits they were promised, while King claimed that all employees received full health care coverage. Former co-workers at The North Star described King as a poor fiscal manager, absent, and incompetent, according to The Daily Beast.

=== Activism ===
In August 2015, King launched Justice Together, an organization to identify police brutality and lobby local politicians for change. He unilaterally disbanded the organization in the fall of 2016 to the surprise of many of the group's members. In September 2016, King proposed an Injustice Boycott for December of that year.

In an October 11, 2017, article in The Washington Post, King was credited with leading a successful months-long and far-reaching social media campaign which led to the identification and arrest of three of the men behind the August 12, 2017 assault on DeAndre Harris during the Unite the Right rally in Charlottesville. Three men were arrested for the parking-garage beating.

In 2018, King co-founded Real Justice PAC, a political action committee to help elect prosecutors who support criminal justice reform at the county and city levels.

== Controversies ==
=== Deleted false sexual assault accusation against Texas state trooper ===
On May 20, 2018, King accused a white Texas state trooper of sexually assaulting Sherita Dixon-Cole, a Black human resources professional. The trooper had arrested Dixon-Cole for drunk driving, and King based his accusation on statements she and her family made to King and Philadelphia-based lawyer S. Lee Merritt. King's social media posts, which identified the trooper by name, went viral, and "substantial harassment and threats" were made against the arresting trooper as well as another trooper with the same last name. The Texas Department of Public Safety subsequently released nearly two hours of bodycam footage on May 22 that exonerated the trooper. Merritt subsequently apologized for the false accusation and national attention he had brought to the case. King deleted his social media posts after the body-cam video was released.

=== Jazmine Barnes shooting ===
On December 30, 2018, seven-year-old Jazmine Barnes was killed in a drive-by shooting in Houston at 7 am. On Twitter, King offered a $25,000 reward for information that could help identify the shooter. The reward eventually rose to $100,000 after other donors joined the cause, including S. Lee Merritt, an attorney advising Jazmine's family.

In a now-deleted tweet, King posted the mugshot of Robert Paul Cantrell, a white male, and identified him as being involved in the shooting. In the tweet, King stated, "We've had 20 people call or email us and say he is a racist, violent asshole and always has been. Just tell me everything you know." Police later said the man was not connected with the crime, and King deleted the tweet, though not until the man had received threats on social media. Police credited King with providing a tip that helped lead them to suspect Eric Black Jr., who later admitted he was involved in the shooting.

The incident was revived in late July 2019 when Cantrell committed suicide in his jail cell, where he was being held on separate robbery and evasion charges. Just before he died, he allegedly told his lawyer that he was concerned about the death threats his family was still receiving in the aftermath of false claims of his involvement in Jazmine Barnes' murder.

=== Fundraising activities and disputes ===
King has repeatedly faced accusations from colleagues and fellow activists of raising money for unclear purposes, or overpromising results from fundraising. He has also faced calls of fiscal mismanagement, inattention to his projects, and "radical incompetence."

In March 2010, while still a pastor, he founded aHomeinHaiti.org as a subsidiary of Courageous Church and used eBay and Twitter to raise $1.5 million to send tents to Haiti after the country's devastating 2010 earthquake. Desperate Housewives star Eva Longoria was a spokesperson for the campaign. King's work for Haiti inspired him to launch TwitChange.com, a charity auction site. TwitChange held Twitter charity auctions on eBay, where celebrities offered to retweet winning bidders' tweets in exchange for support of a particular charity. One campaign raised funds to build an orphanage in Bonneau, Haiti. In 2010, TwitChange won the Mashable Award for "Most Creative Social Good Campaign".

In 2011, King asked for donations online so he could climb the Seven Summits, but abandoned the effort only a few days into training.

In 2012, King and web designer Chad Kellough founded HopeMob.org, a charity site that used voting to select a particular person's story and then raise money for that story until its goal was met. The money went to an organization which provided for the person's needs, not to the person individually. After one goal was met, the next story in line would then get funds raised. HopeMob initially raised funds to build their platform in January 2012 on the crowdfunding site Kickstarter. Their campaign raised about $125,000.

King has also raised money for multiple causes incidents where the Black Lives Matter movement has been involved, including the shooting of Tamir Rice. Through the fund-raising website, YouCaring.com, King raised $60,000 for Rice's family after the 12-year-old Cleveland, Ohio resident was killed in 2014 by two city policemen After learning that Rice had not been buried as of five months after the shooting and that Rice's mother had moved into a homeless shelter, he started the fund to assist the Rice family. In May 2015, however, family attorney Timothy Kucharski stated that neither he nor the Rice family had heard of King or the fundraiser, and they had not received any money. The money raised was then seized by the court and placed into Tamir Rice's estate instead of being freely available to the family. In 2022, King was criticized for spending over $40,000 on a purebred mastiff guard dog using PAC money; King reportedly returned the dog later due to it having "too much energy." Rice's mother publicly called out King, saying "Personally I don't understand how you sleep at night." King and the Rice family's new legal counsel, Benjamin Crump, then started a second charity drive with the proceeds going directly to the family. An additional $25,000 was raised.

King has been accused of raising funds for causes that were never received by those he was fundraising for, including at Justice Together after King abruptly closed the organization. A former member of the organization who asked to have a donation returned said that King refused to refund her money. An investigation by Goldie Taylor of The Daily Beast detailed a variety of questionable financial practices, such as discrepancies in reported amounts raised the Haiti relief project as well as King's personal income from short-lived crowdfunding venture HopeMob numbering almost 40% of the company's total revenue. Activists on Twitter questioned if he took the $100,000 reward money for information that led to the arrest of the men who shot Jazmine Barnes. On September 12, 2019, Black Lives Matter activist DeRay Mckesson wrote a lengthy article raising multiple concerns in regards to King, especially related to fundraising.

King has denied all allegations of wrongdoing. On January 15, 2019, he tweeted that he was pursuing legal action against social justice activists on Twitter who questioned his previous fundraisers, and his attorneys later sent cease-and-desist letters. David Dennis Jr. wrote in NewsOne that the purpose of the cease-and-desist letters seemed to be "old-fashioned intimidation and forcible silencing". King wrote an editorial explaining the purpose of taking legal action and addressed some specific critiques levied against him.

=== Deleted Twitter post on depictions of Jesus ===
In June 2020, King tweeted that statue, murals, and stained-glass windows depicting a white Jesus should be removed. "I think the statues of the white European they claim is Jesus should also come down," he tweeted. "They are a form of white supremacy. Always have been." King's comments quickly drew condemnation from some on Twitter, including several prominent conservative figures. The tweet has since been deleted.

=== Grassroots Law Project ===
In 2020, King and Lee Merritt founded the Grassroots Law Project. In its first year, the organization raised over $6.5 million. More than $2.5 million went to the non-profit's most-publicized program, setting up unofficial Truth and Reconciliation Commissions in three American cities. However, after two years, none of the commissions appeared to be active or exist. In addition, according to The Daily Beast, the group faced scrutiny for the high compensation received by King (more than $250,000) and others. In addition, the organization's complex relationship with the Grassroots Law PAC raised questions about tax and regulatory arrangements.

=== Claimed involvement in release of Israeli hostages by Hamas ===
Following the 2023 Hamas-led attack on Israel, King posted on social media claiming that he had worked "behind the scenes" with Hamas and Qatar to help secure the release of two Israeli-American hostages: 17-year-old Natalie Raanan and her 59-year-old mother Judith Raanan. The family of these hostages, however, said that King had "lied" and "fabricated his involvement."

In December 2023, King's account on Instagram was deactivated by Meta, which he claimed was due to his pro-Palestinian posts during the Gaza war.

== Politics ==
King left the Democratic Party after the 2016 election, alleging corruption and lack of neutrality during the 2016 primaries. In 2018, Shaun King expressed disdain for Kamala Harris and said he did not intend to support her or Joe Biden in the 2020 Democratic primaries due to their positions on criminal justice. He later changed his view as he said her stance has changed, tweeting, "I am incredibly proud to see a brilliant Black woman, and HBCU grad, chosen as a Vice Presidential nominee."

== Personal life ==
King is married and has five children; three of his children were conceived with his wife and two were adopted. He also has had foster children, nieces, and nephews living with him. In March 2024, on the eve of Ramadan, King and his wife Rai King formally converted to Islam from Christianity in the presence of Palestinian-American imam Omar Suleiman.
