= The Christian Recorder =

Monthly African-American newspaper

- The Christian Recorder, August 2020
- Type: Monthly newspaper
- Owner: African Methodist Episcopal Church
- Publisher: Roderick D. Belin
- Editor: John Thomas III
- Founded: July 1, 1852; 173 years ago
- Headquarters: 900 13th Avenue South; Nashville, TN 37212
- ISSN: 1050-6039
- OCLC number: 14096028
- Website: www.thechristianrecorder.com

The Christian Recorder is the official newspaper of the African Methodist Episcopal Church and is the oldest continuously published African-American newspaper in the United States. It has been called "arguably the most powerful black periodical of the nineteenth century," a time when there were few sources for news and information about Black communities.

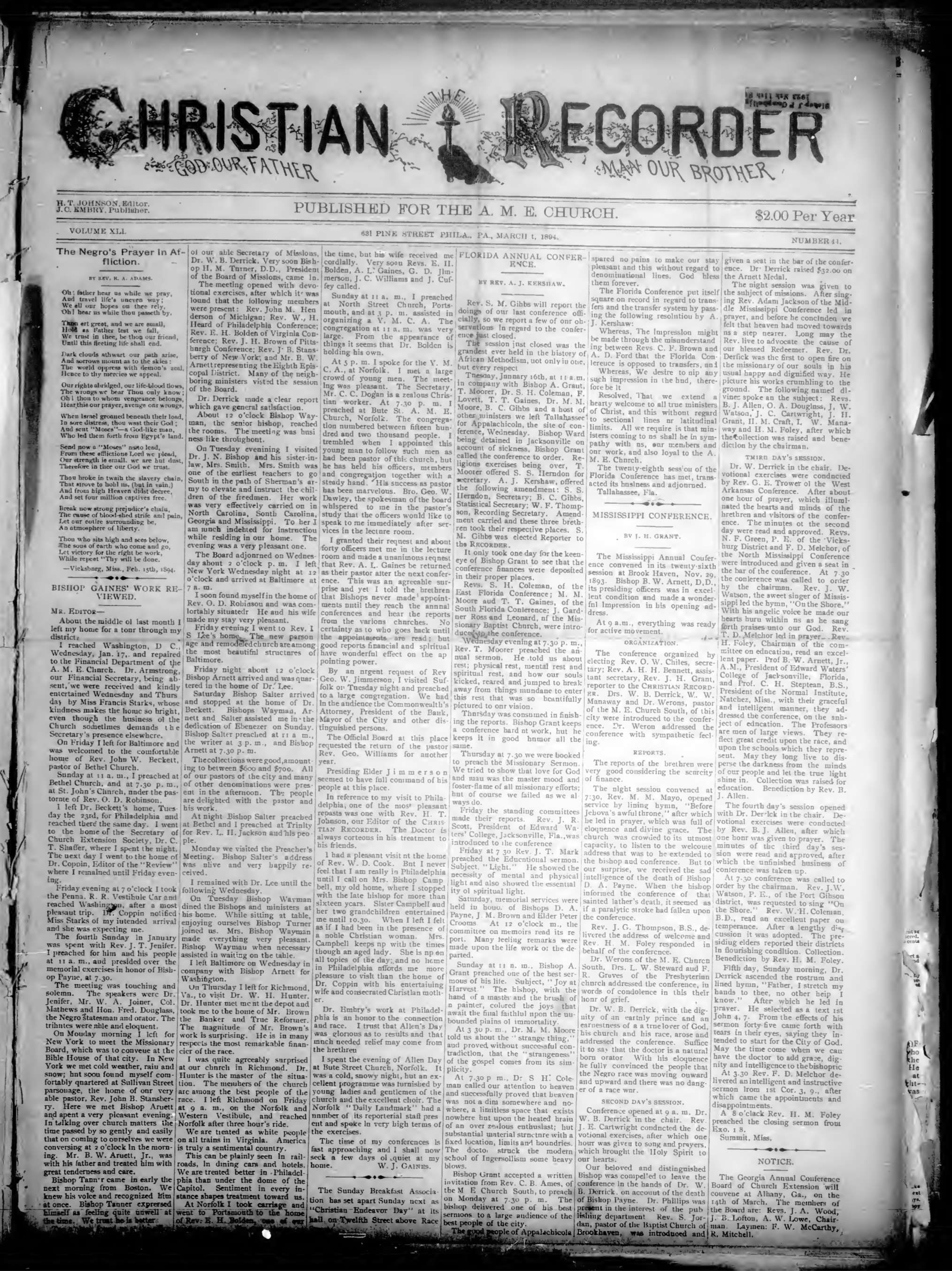
The Christian Recorder, March 1894

The Recorder covered secular as well as religious news, and reported news of the black regiments serving in the Civil War. It advocated support for Union troops. It was also known for having an Information Wanted section, where Black families who had been forcibly separated in the slave trade could seek news about their missing loved ones. The paper's coverage included birth, marriage, and death notices.

It also featured music, poetry, and reader stories, and was "a major source of literature by and for African-Americans" during this time period. The paper published Julia C. Collins' novel as 31 serialized chapters in 1865, as well as many of her essays. It also printed works by Frances Ellen Watkins Harper and James W. C. Pennington.

== History ==
The Christian Recorder was originally a weekly paper called the Mystery, later The Christian Herald, started by Rev. Augustus R. Green in Pittsburgh, Pennsylvania. The name was changed to The Christian Recorder in 1852 under the editorship of Rev. M. M. Clark, with approval of the AME Church General Conference. It published ads to reunite black families following emancipation. It was published by the AME Church Book Concern in Philadelphia, Pennsylvania, a city that became a publishing center. The paper covered all geographic areas of the AME Church, but regional versions also developed, including the Southern Christian Recorder and the Western Christian Recorder. These two were later merged to create the Southwestern Christian Recorder.

In 1952 after the AME Church Book Concern was dissolved, the paper's headquarters moved to Nashville, Tennessee. In 1960 the Southwestern Christian Recorder and The Christian Recorder combined to form The AME Christian Recorder. In 1984, the paper reverted to using the original name The Christian Recorder. Today, the paper is a member of the Associated Church Press, the Religion Communicators Council, and the National Newspaper Publishers Association.

== See also ==
- A.M.E. Church Review
