= United American Cemetery =

African-American cemetery in Cincinnati, Ohio

United American Cemetery Colored American Cemetery American Cemetery
- Interactive map of United American Cemetery; Colored American Cemetery; American Cemetery

Details
- Established: 1844
- Location: Cincinnati, Ohio
- Country: United States
- Coordinates: 39°09′58″N 84°24′50″W
- Type: Private
- Owned by: Union Baptist Church
- Size: 11.5 acres (4.7 ha)
- No. of graves: >3000
- Website: United American Cemetery
- Find a Grave: United American Cemetery; Colored American Cemetery; American Cemetery

The United American Cemetery is the oldest African-American cemetery in Ohio, located on Duck Creek Road in Cincinnati, Ohio and founded in 1844 by the United Colored American Association. Among those interred at the cemetery who are notable are Horace Sudduth, an early twentiethcentury real estate speculator and owner of the Manse Hotel in Walnut Hills, and John Isom Gaines, a black educator. It is also known as the Colored American Cemetery.

This cemetery is located in Section 23 of Columbia Township. The entrance is on the north side of Duck Creek Road, about 1500 feet east of Kennedy Avenue. The cemetery encompasses 11.5 acres.

By the middle of the twentieth century the cemetery became increasingly neglected. A group of plot owners sued the cemetery association in 1956. The courts appointed a new board to operate the cemetery but the board was unable to convince plot owners to pay for perpetual care which would generate funds for ongoing cemetery maintenance. In 1968 the cemetery was transferred to Union Baptist Church.
