= The North Star (anti-slavery newspaper) =

Paper by Frederick Douglass (1847–1851)

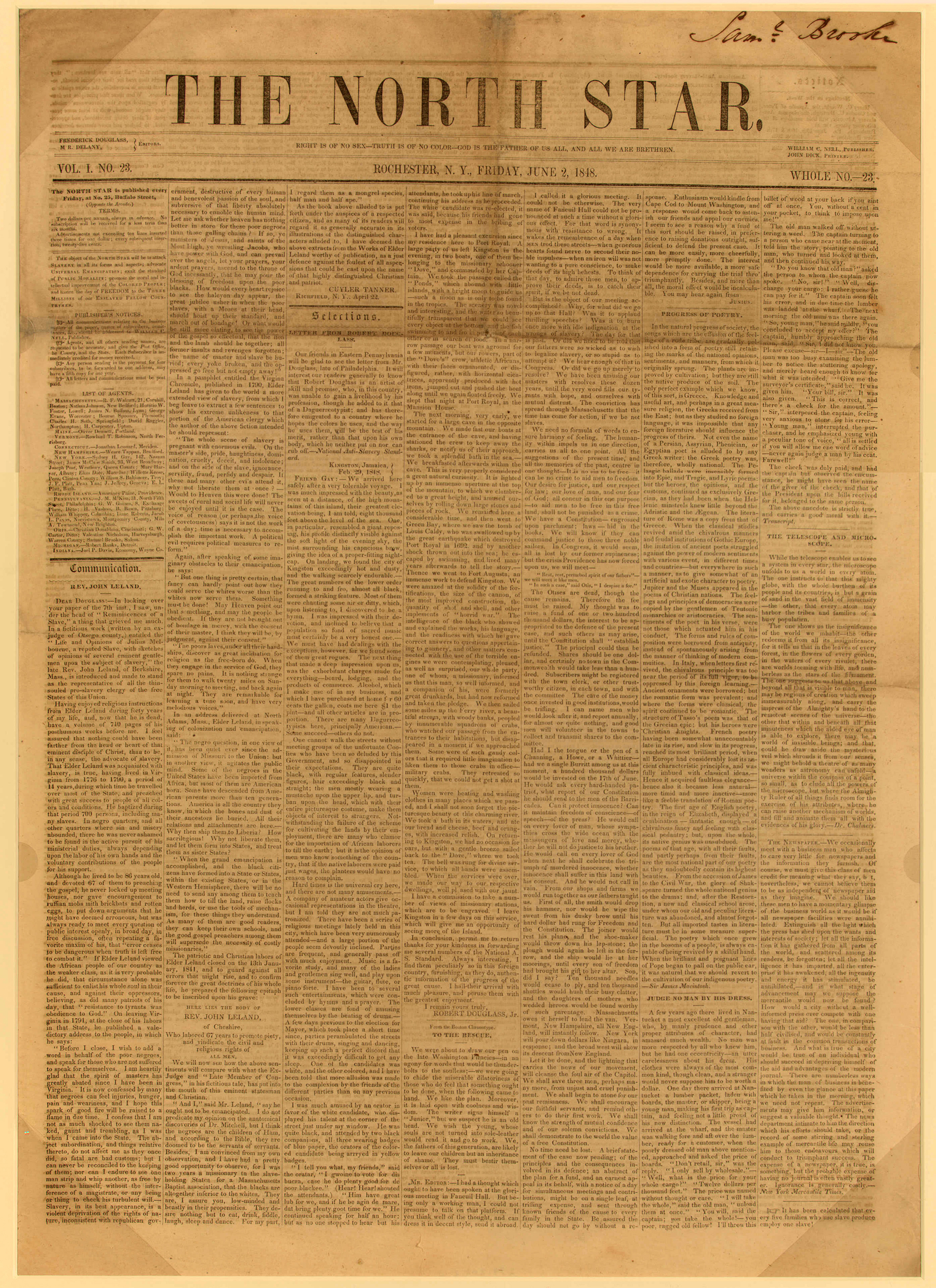
- The North Star, June 2, 1848
- Type: Weekly newspaper
- Publisher: W.C. Nell
- Editor: Frederick Douglass
- Founded: December 3, 1847
- Ceased publication: June 1, 1851
- Language: American English
- City: Rochester, New York
- Country: United States
- OCLC number: 10426469

The North Star was a nineteenth-century anti-slavery newspaper published from the Talman Building in Rochester, New York, by abolitionists Martin Delany and Frederick Douglass. The paper commenced publication on December 3, 1847, and ceased as The North Star in June 1851, when it merged with Gerrit Smith's Liberty Party Paper (based in Syracuse, New York) to form Frederick Douglass' Paper. At the time of the Civil War, it was Douglass' Monthly.

The North Star's slogan was: "Right is of no Sex—Truth is of no Color—God is the Father of us all, and we are all Brethren."

== Inspiration ==
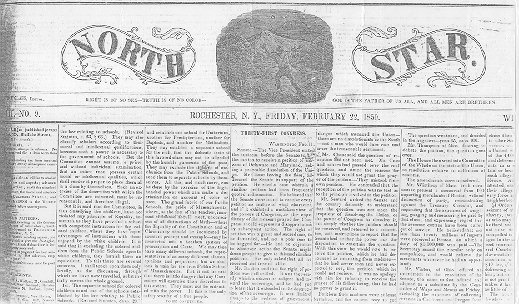
February 22, 1850 issue

In 1846, Frederick Douglass was first inspired to publish The North Star after subscribing to The Liberator, a weekly newspaper published by William Lloyd Garrison. The Liberator was a newspaper established by Garrison and his supporters founded upon moral principles. The North Star title was a reference to the directions given to runaway slaves trying to reach the Northern states and Canada: "Follow the North Star." Figuratively, Canada was also "the north star."

Like The Liberator, The North Star published weekly and was four pages long. It was sold by subscription of $2 per year to more than 4,000 readers in the United States, Europe, and the Caribbean. The first of its four pages focused on current events concerning abolitionist issues.

The Garrisonian Liberator was founded upon the notion that the Constitution was fundamentally pro-slavery and that the Union ought to be dissolved. Douglass disagreed but supported the nonviolent approach to the emancipation of slaves by education and moral suasion. Under the guidance of the abolitionist society, Douglass became acquainted with the pursuit of the emancipation of slaves through a New England religious perspective. Garrison had earlier convinced the Massachusetts Anti-Slavery Society to hire Douglass as an agent to tour with Garrison and tell audiences about his experiences as a slave. Douglass also worked with another abolitionist, Martin R. Delany, who traveled to lecture, report, and generate subscriptions to The North Star.

In the first issue, Douglass stated the paper's object was to attack slavery in all its forms, advocate universal emancipation, and promote the moral and intellectual improvement of African Americans. The motto's "Right is of no Sex" also signalled support for women's rights.

== Editorial perspective and breadth ==
Douglass's attitude toward political inaction changed when he attended the National Convention of Colored Citizens, the antislavery convention in Buffalo, New York, in August 1843. One of the many speakers present at the convention was Henry Highland Garnet. Formerly a slave in Maryland, Garnet was a Presbyterian minister who supported violent action against slaveholders. "Douglass led the counterattack" at the 1843 convention, "stating that there was too much violence in [Garnet's] Address...."

During a nineteen-month stay in Britain and Ireland, several of Douglass' supporters bought his freedom and assisted with the purchase of a printing press. With this assistance, Douglass was determined to begin an African-American newspaper that would engage the anti-slavery movement politically. On his return to the United States in March 1847, Douglass shared his ideas of The North Star with his mentors. Ignoring the advice of the American Anti-Slavery Society, Douglass moved to Rochester, New York, to publish the first edition. When questioned on his decision to create The North Star, Douglass is said to have responded,

I still see before me a life of toil and trials..., but, justice must be done, the truth must be told.... I will not be silent.

In covering politics in Europe, literature, slavery in the United States, and culture generally in both The North Star and Frederick Douglass' Paper, Douglass achieved unconstrained independence to write freely on topics from the California Gold Rush to Uncle Tom's Cabin to Charles Dickens's Bleak House. In 1848, he published an open letter to Horatio Gates Warner after Warner objected to Rosetta Douglass' enrollment at Seward Seminary in Rochester. The letter, which advocated for desegregation of all schools, was republished in papers across the country.

Besides Garnet, other Oneida Institute alumni that collaborated with The North Star were Samuel Ringgold Ward and Jermain Wesley Loguen.

Douglass was assisted by philanthropist Gerrit Smith. Smith later merged his own anti-slavery paper with The North Star to create Frederick Douglass' Paper.

The only complete collection of Douglass' newspapers was destroyed in a house fire at his home in Rochester in 1872.

== See also ==
- Abolitionist publications
- List of newspapers in New York
- Shaun King § The North Star

== Bibliography ==
- Berlin, Ira, "Who Freed the Slaves? Emancipation and Its Meaning", in Blight, David W. and Simpson, Brooks D., eds. (1997). Union and Emancipation: Essays on Politics and Race in the Civil War Era. Kent State University Press, p. 121.
