= Irvine Garland Penn =

American educator (1867–1930)

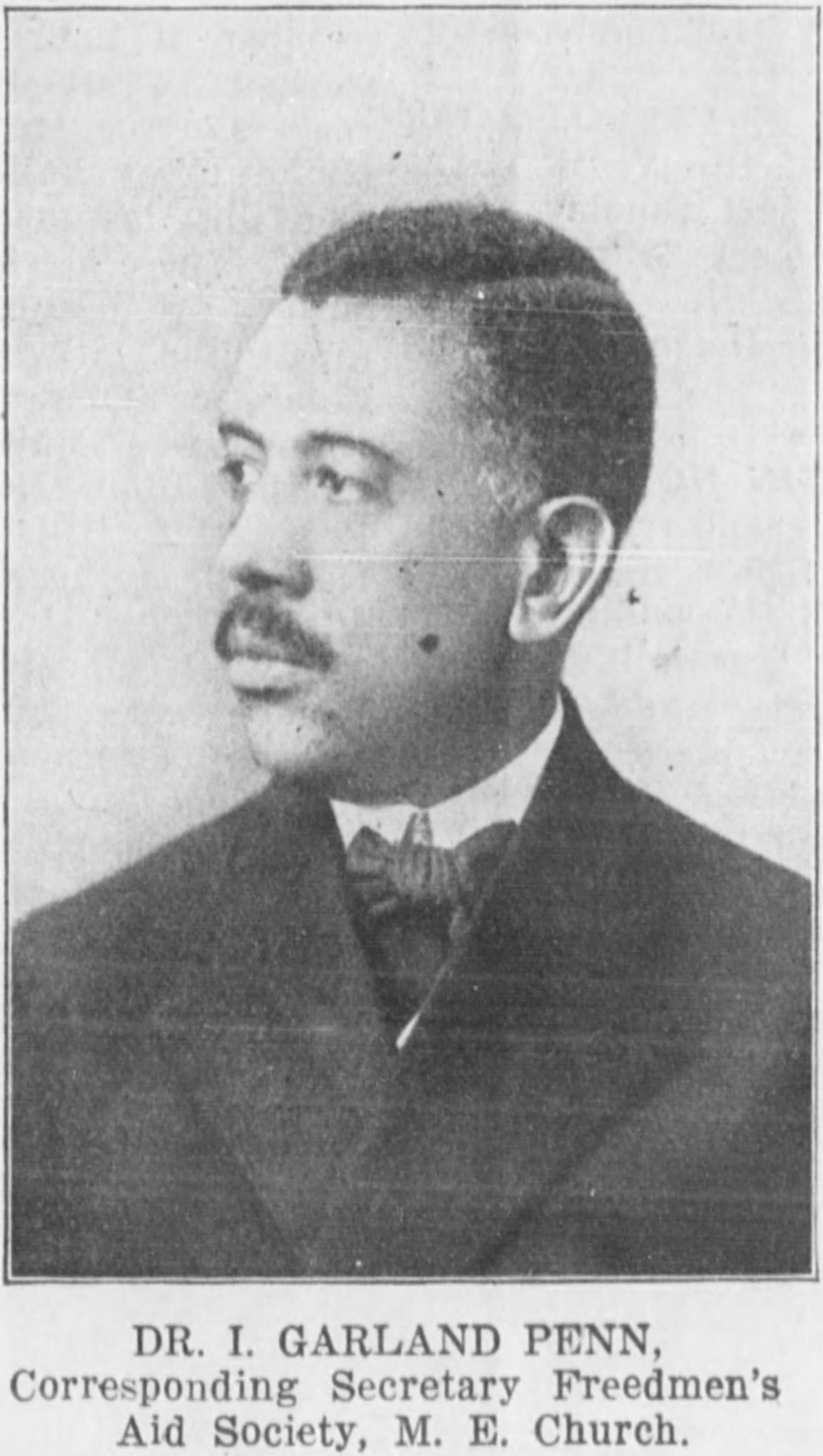
- Penn in 1913
- Born: October 7, 1867; New Glasgow, Virginia
- Died: July 22, 1930 (aged 62); Cincinnati, Ohio
- Education: Rust College, Wiley College
- Occupations: Educator, writer, journalist
- Spouse: Anna Belle Rhodes (m. 1889; died 1930)
- Children: 7

Personal life
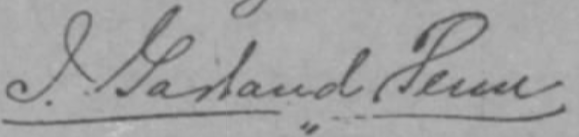
- Signature

Religious life
- Religion: Methodist

Irvine Garland Penn (October 7, 1867 – July 22, 1930) was an American educator, journalist, and lay leader in the Methodist Episcopal Church. He was the author of The Afro-American Press and Its Editors, published in 1891, and a coauthor with Frederick Douglass, Ida B. Wells, and Ferdinand Lee Barnett of The Reason Why the Colored American Is Not in the World's Columbia Exposition in 1893. In the late 1890s, he became an officer in the Methodist Episcopal Church and played an important role advocating for the interests of African Americans in the church until his death.

== Early life ==
Irvine Garland Penn was born on October 7, 1867, in New Glasgow, Virginia. He moved to Lynchburg, Virginia at the age of 5. He entered the newspaper business before his senior year in high school, and finished high school some time later. He continued his education, eventually receiving a Master's degree from Rust College in 1890 and a doctorate from Wiley College in 1908.

== Journalism ==
In 1886, he was a correspondent for the Richmond Planet, the Knoxville Negro World, and the New York Age, and frequently wrote about African Americans. In 1886, he became editor of a small black paper called the Laborer. In 1887, he became teacher in Lynchburg. He was promoted to principal of the school in 1895.

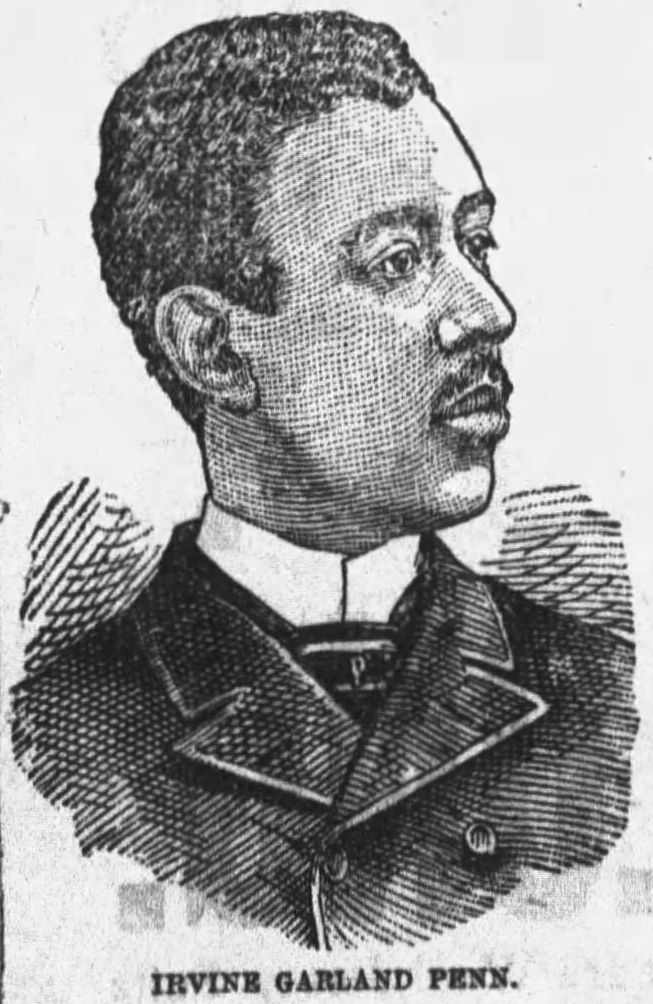
I G Penn in 1892

His writing became well known and frequently took on civil rights and injustice faced by African Americans. He published a volume of biographies of African American newspaper editors and journalists, The Afro-American Press and Its Editors, in 1891. In 1893, Frederick Douglass, Ida B. Wells, Ferdinand Lee Barnett, and Penn published a pamphlet, The Reason Why the Colored American Is Not in the World's Columbia Exposition, as a part of a boycott by African Americans of the 1893 Chicago Columbian Exposition in response to segregation of African American exhibits. Two years later, he was the director and organizer for the African American exhibits at the 1895 Atlanta Cotton States and International Exposition, and was important in the decision to put Booker T. Washington in a leading role, which partially launched Washington into the national spotlight.

== Lay leader in the Methodist church ==
In 1897, he moved to Atlanta to become Assistant General Secretary of the Epworth League for the Colored Conferences of the Methodist Episcopal Church. Penn was also the creator of the National Negro Young People's Christian and Educational Congress, and he taught at Rust College. He also continued to write and published another book, The College of Life in 1902.

In 1912, he moved to Cincinnati and became the co-corresponding secretary of the Freedmen's Aid Society of the Methodist Episcopal Church. In this position, he was frequently a fund raiser for Methodist Colleges, particularly Rust University, Morgan College, and Philander Smith College. Among his closest benefactors was James N. Gamble (son of James Gamble of Procter & Gamble). In the mid 1910s, Penn took part in a movement for unification of Methodist churches in America which sought to mend the rift between North and South Churches largely due to slavery. Penn and Robert E. Jones were the leading African American members of the Joint Commission on Unification of the Methodist Episcopal Church. The pair played dual role in Methodist unification meetings in reassuring white delegates that they were not campaigning for racial social equality, but also working for the interests of black Methodists.

The ME Church combined the black and white boards of education in 1924, removing Penn from his position as secretary of the Board of Education for Negroes. Penn's work was severely criticized, although he remained a member of the combined board.

== Family and death ==
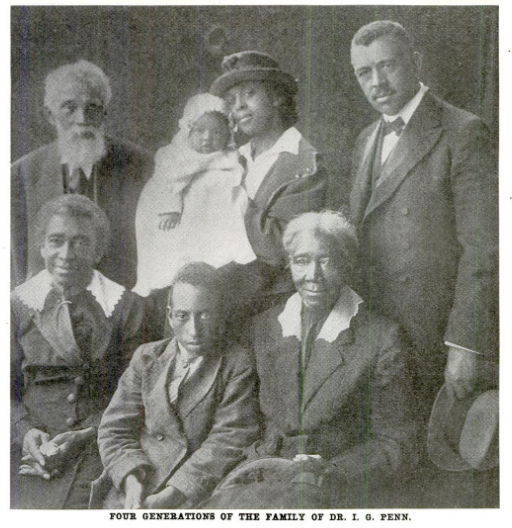
I. Garland Penn and four generations of his family

He married Anna Belle Rhodes from Lynchburg in 1889. She graduated from Shaw University and taught there for several years. They had seven children.

Penn fell seriously ill in Cincinnati in early July 1930, a few weeks after the death of his wife. He died of heart disease on July 22, 1930. There is some speculation that his death was related to injuries sustained while being thrown off a segregated train car in South Carolina.

== Writings ==
=== Books ===
- The Afro-American Press and Its Editors (1891)
- The Reason Why the Colored American Is Not in the World's Columbia Exposition (1893), co-authored coauthor with Frederick Douglass, Ida B. Wells, and Ferdinand Lee Barnett
- The College of Life, or, Practical Self-Educator: A Manual of Self-Improvement for the Colored Race, Forming an Educational Emancipator and a Guide to Success, co-authored with Joseph R. Gay and Henry Davenport Northrop

== See also ==
- African American newspapers
- List of African-American newspapers and media outlets

== Sources ==
- Davis, Morris L. The Methodist unification: Christianity and the politics of race in the Jim Crow era. NYU Press, 2008.
