= List of newspapers in Rhode Island =

This is a list of newspapers in Rhode Island. Current publications are shown in sections according to their regular publication schedule. For dailies, see § Daily newspapers; for weeklies, see § Weekly newspapers (by owner); for longer publication intervals, see § Monthly or bi-monthly newspapers.

For Rhode Island newspapers which are no longer produced, see § Defunct.

== Daily newspapers ==
- The Boston Globe (Rhode Island) of Boston, owned by Boston Globe Media Partners, via their Providence-based bureau, covering all of Rhode Island
- The Brown Daily Herald of Providence, owned independently, covering Brown University
- The Call of Woonsocket, owned by RISN Operations, covering northern Providence County
- Kent County Daily Times of West Warwick, owned by RISN Operations, covering most of Kent County
- The Newport Daily News of Newport, owned by GateHouse Media, covering most of Newport County
- The Providence Journal of Providence, owned by GateHouse Media, covering all of Rhode Island
- The Times of Pawtucket, owned by RISN Operations, covering eastern Providence County
- The Westerly Sun of Westerly, owned by RISN Operations, covering western Washington County

== Weekly newspapers (by owner) ==
- Beacon Communications
  - Cranston Herald of Cranston
  - Johnston Sun Rise of Johnston
  - Warwick Beacon of Warwick
- Breeze Publications
  - The North Providence Breeze of North Providence
  - The Valley Breeze of Cumberland & Lincoln, Providence County
  - The Valley Breeze of North Smithfield and Woonsocket, Providence County; Blackstone, Massachusetts
  - The Valley Breeze of Pawtucket, Providence County
  - The Valley Breeze & Observer of Smithfield, Scituate, Foster & Glocester, Providence County
- East Bay Newspapers
  - Barrington Times of Barrington
  - Bristol Phoenix of Bristol
  - East Providence Post of East Providence
  - Sakonnet Times, covering Tiverton and Little Compton
  - Times-Gazette of Warren
  - Portsmouth Times of Portsmouth
- RISN Operations Rhode Island Media Group
  - The Chariho Times of western Washington County
  - The Coventry Courier of Coventry
  - The East Greenwich Pendulum of East Greenwich
  - The Narragansett Times of Narragansett
  - The Standard-Times of North Kingstown
  - The IndependentRI (South County Newspapers), covering South Kingstown, North Kingstown, Narragansett and The University of Rhode Island
  - The Express of Westerly
- Independent newspapers
  - The Block Island Times of New Shoreham
  - Jamestown Press of Jamestown
  - Providence Business News, based in Providence but covering the entire state
- College newspapers
  - The Anchor of Rhode Island College
  - The Archway of Bryant University
  - The College Hill Independent of Brown University
  - The Good 5 Cent Cigar of University of Rhode Island
  - The Hawks' Herald of Roger Williams University
  - The Unfiltered Lens of the Community College of Rhode Island

== Monthly or bi-monthly newspapers ==
- The Rhode Island Wave, published monthly and owned by The Rhode Island Wave, LLC. and Deana Grenier. Based in Providence, but covering the entire state.
- Jewish Rhode Island, published monthly and owned by the Jewish Alliance of Greater Rhode Island. Based in Providence, but covering the entire state.
- Mercury, published monthly and owned by Gatehouse Media. An alternative weekly-style paper covering Rhode Island arts, entertainment and food in Newport and Middletown.

== Defunct ==
=== Newport ===
Newspapers published in Newport, Rhode Island:

- The Companion; and Commercial Centinel. W., May 2 – Sept. 8, 1798.
- Gazette Francoise. W., Nov. 17, 1780 – Jan. 2, 1781.
- The Guardian Of Liberty. W., Oct. 3 – Dec. 27, 1800+
- The Newport Gazette. W., Jan. 16, 1777 – Oct. 6, 1779.
- The Newport Herald. W., March 1, 1787 – Sept. 17, 1791.
- The Newport Mercury. W., S.W, Jan. 30, 1759 – Dec. 30, 1800+
- The Newport Mercury, Or, The Weekly Advertiser. W., June 19, 1758 – Jan. 23, 1759.
- The Rhode-Island Gazette. W., Sept. 27, 1732 – March 24, 1733.
- Rhode Island Museum. W., July 7 – Dec. 29, 1794.
- Weekly Companion. W., April 27 – July 20, 1799.
- Weekly Companion; and the Commercial Centinel. W., Sept. 15, 1798 – April 20, 1799.

=== Providence ===
Newspapers published in Providence, Rhode Island:

- The American Journal and General Advertiser. W., S.W., March 18, 1779 – August 29, 1781.

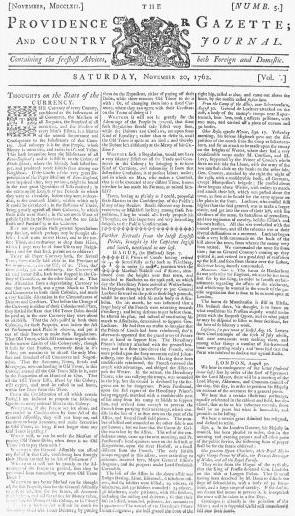
Providence Gazette, and Country Journal, 1762

- Manufacturers and Farmer's Journal, semiweekly, May 1, 1848 – Dec. 30, 1907
- The Evening Bulletin. 1863–1995
- The Providence Gazette. W., Jan. 10, 1795 – Dec. 27, 1800+
- The Providence Gazette, and Country Journal. W., Oct. 20, 1762 – Jan. 3, 1795.
- The Providence Journal, and Town and Country Advertiser. W., Jan. 2, 1799 – Dec. 31, 1800+
- The Providence News, September 21, 1891 – May 10, 1906
- State Gazette, and Town and Country Advertiser. S.W., Jan. 4 – July 2, 1796.
- The United States Chronicle. W., Feb. 21, 1793 – Dec. 25, 1800+
- The United States Chronicle: Political, Commercial, Historical. W., Jan. 1, 1784 – Feb. 14, 1793.
- The Providence Phoenix, 1978 – Oct. 17, 2014

=== Warren ===
Newspapers published in Warren, Rhode Island:

- Herald of the United States. W., Jan. 14, 1792 – Dec. 26, 1800+

== See also ==
- Media in Rhode Island
- List of African-American newspapers in Rhode Island

Comprehensive

- Lists of newspapers
- List of newspapers in the United States

Frequency

- List of free daily newspapers in the United States
- List of weekly newspapers in the United States

Circulation

- List of international newspapers originating in the United States
- List of national newspapers in the United States
- List of newspapers in the United States by circulation
- List of newspapers serving cities over 100,000 in the United States

Foreign language

- List of French-language newspapers published in the United States
- List of German-language newspapers published in the United States
- List of Spanish-language newspapers published in the United States

Specialty

- List of African-American newspapers in the United States
- List of alternative weekly newspapers in the United States
- List of business newspapers in the United States
- List of family-owned newspapers in the United States
- List of Jewish newspapers in the United States
- List of LGBTQ periodicals in the United States
- List of student newspapers in the United States
- List of supermarket tabloids in the United States
- List of underground press in the United States

Other

- List of defunct newspapers of the United States
