= Breeze Publications =

- Company type: Private
- Industry: Newspapers
- Founded: 1996
- Headquarters: Lincoln, Rhode Island, U.S.
- Key people: Thomas V. Ward, publisher James Quinn, deputy publisher Ethan Shorey, Managing Editor
- Products: Five weekly newspapers in northern Rhode Island
- Website: valleybreeze.com

Breeze Publications is a privately owned publisher based in Lincoln, Rhode Island, serving northern and western Providence County with five free tabloid-format weekly newspapers.

Founded in 1996 by Thomas V. Ward & James Quinn, Breeze Publications began—at first, produced in Ward's living room—with its flagship title, The Valley Breeze, which later grew to two editions. In 2006, the company acquired two other weeklies in neighboring towns. In 2009, they also started a new paper which covers Pawtucket. The papers now employ 19 full-time and eight part-time employees.

== Properties ==
Each of the Breeze newspapers is printed on tabloid-sized pages and distributed free in the towns it covers, every Thursday, except for The North Providence Breeze and The Valley Breeze Pawtucket edition which are published on Wednesdays.

The North Providence Breeze
Originally called the North Star when it was founded in 1997, Breeze acquired the free weekly covering North Providence in 2006 and rebranded it. It does not have a website of its own, but North Providence news is posted on The Valley Breeze & Observer site. Its circulation was 6,310 in 2022.

The Valley Breeze, Cumberland-Lincoln Edition
Ward's & Quinn's first Breeze newspaper, The Valley Breeze has covered Cumberland, Rhode Island and Lincoln, Rhode Island, since 1996. It has a distribution of 8,722 copies in Cumberland and 4,375 copies in Lincoln as of 2022.

The Valley Breeze, North Smithfield-Blackstone-Woonsocket Edition
The success of The Valley Breeze led to the establishment of a second edition in 1999, covering North Smithfield and Woonsocket, Rhode Island. In 2001, the newspaper began covering Blackstone, Massachusetts. It has a distribution of 1,319 copies in Blackstone, 3,092 copies in North Smithfield and 7,359 copies in Woonsocket as of 2022.

The Valley Breeze & Observer
Called The Observer when Breeze bought it in 2006, The Valley Breeze & Observer was converted from paid to free delivery. It covers Foster, Glocester, Scituate and Smithfield, Rhode Island, in western Providence County. The Observer was founded in 1955. As of 2022, it distributes 4,331 copies in Smithfield, 302 in Hope/Harmony, 1,309 in Chepachet/Clayville, 1,510 in Greenville, 906 in North Scituate and 493 in Foster.

The Valley Breeze, Pawtucket Edition
Ward's & Quinn's fifth Breeze newspaper, The Valley Breeze has covered Pawtucket, Rhode Island, since 2009. It runs 8,000 copies per week. Its circulation was 5,273 in 2022.

== Sisters and competitors ==
Breeze papers compete with The Providence Journal, the only statewide daily newspaper, and with the RISN Operations dailies The Call and The Times, in Woonsocket and nearby Pawtucket, respectively. In Blackstone, The Valley Breeze competes with the Telegram & Gazette of Worcester, Massachusetts, and with The Milford Daily News of Milford, Massachusetts.

All five Breeze newspapers are members of Rhode Island Newspaper Group, an advertising sales consortium that consists of five weekly newspaper publishers in suburban Providence. Other member publishers are Beacon Communications, East Bay Newspapers, Hathaway Publishing and Southern Rhode Island Newspapers.
