= The Herald News =

Newspaper from Fall River, Massachusetts

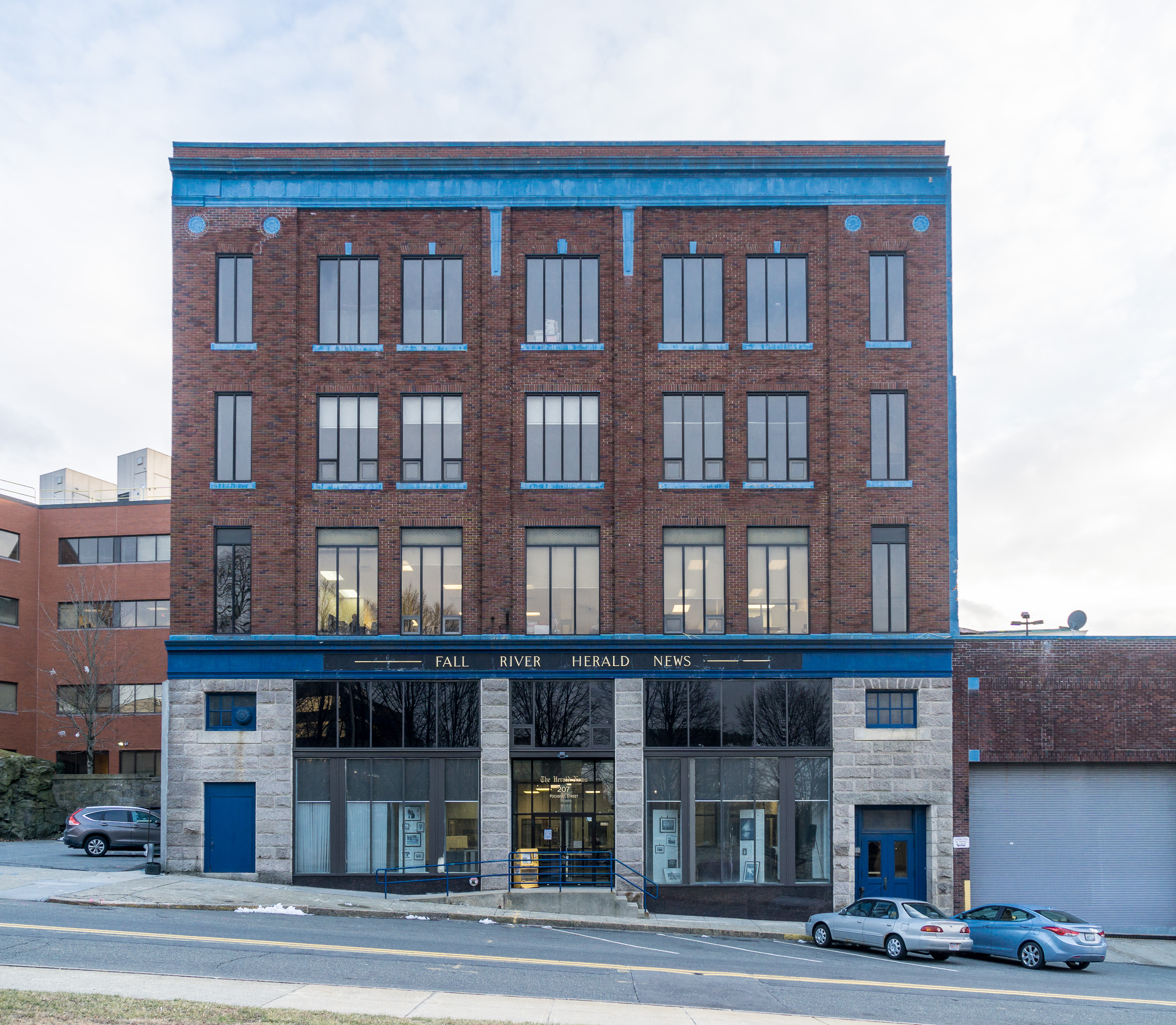
- Type: Daily newspaper
- Format: Broadsheet
- Owner: USA Today Co.
- Publisher: Mark Olivieri
- Editor: Lynne Sullivan
- Founded: 1892
- Headquarters: , Fall River, Massachusetts 02722, United States
- Circulation: 14,979 Daily; 15,489 Sunday (as of 2012)
- ISSN: 1074-052X
- Website: heraldnews.com

The Herald News is a daily newspaper based in Fall River, Massachusetts. Its coverage area includes Fall River and the nearby South Coast towns of Dighton, Freetown, Somerset, Swansea and Westport, Massachusetts; as well as Little Compton and Tiverton, Rhode Island. It is owned by USA Today Co.

== Sisters and competitors ==
The Herald News' main competitor to the east is The Standard-Times of the other South Coast city, New Bedford, Massachusetts. In its northern towns, The Herald News competes with the Taunton Daily Gazette, although the two were both owned by Journal Register and sold together to GateHouse.

Before being sold to GateHouse Media in 2006, The Herald News was part of Journal Register's New England group, which included The Call in Woonsocket, Kent County Daily Times and The Times of Pawtucket, all in Rhode Island. The Rhode Island newspapers were not included in the sale.

Also associated with The Herald News, and included in the $70 million GateHouse sale, are O Jornal (a Portuguese-language weekly) and El Latino Expreso (a Spanish-language weekly), catering to the substantial immigrant population of the South Coast, and the Free-Press of North Attleborough, Massachusetts. On July 16, 2010, publication of El Latino Expreso (founded 2004) and the Brazilian American weekly O Jornal Brasileiro (2007) was ended, with a lack of "a sustained advertiser base" and a desire to focus exclusively on O Jornal cited by GateHouse as the reasons to cease production.

== History ==
Three Fall River newspapers combined in 1892 to form The Herald News: the Fall River News, founded in 1845; the Fall River Daily Herald, 1872, and the Fall River Daily Globe, 1885. In the 1960s The Herald-News was owned by Mark Goodson, the creator of the popular television game show "To Tell The Truth." The newspaper established its headquarters on lower Pocasset Street on Fall River, along the Quequechan River, which was routed through a pipe to make way for Interstate 195, from which The Herald-News building remains visible as one enters Fall River from the Braga Bridge. E.J. Dionne, The New York Times Washington Correspondent and later Washington Post columnist worked there as an intern; M. Charles Bakst, long-time columnist of The Providence Journal, began his career there. At its height, The Herald News circulated approximately 45,000 copies per day.

== Prices ==
The Herald News prices are: $2.00 daily, $3.00 Sunday.
