= Welcome to Forever =

2024 science fiction novel by Nathan Tavares

- Author: Nathan Tavares
- Language: English
- Genre: Science fiction
- Publisher: Titan Books
- Publication date: March 2024
- Publication place: United States
- ISBN: 9781803360409

Welcome to Forever is a 2024 science fiction novel by Nathan Tavares. It explores the technology of memory editing and the nature of identity through a romance between its two major characters, Fox and Gabe.

== Synopsis ==
=== Premise ===
In the world of the novel, NIL/E (pronounced "Nile") is a megacorporation which initially served wealthy clients by copying their memories. These could be uploaded into new bodies as needed, effectively curing death. NIL/E was later taken over by a new CEO, Khadija Banks. Under her leadership, NIL/E introduced editing technology which allows for people to replace unpleasant or uncomfortable memories at will. Khadija is forced out of the company by other executives and disappears.

=== Plot ===
Fox is a memory editor; his husband Gabe is a personal trainer. Both grew up on the island refugee camp of Aaru. Fox was adopted by a wealthy couple, while Gabe remained on the island until the camp closed. A terrorist attack on a NIL/E office wipes out most of Fox’s memories. The blast kills Gabe, from whom he was temporarily separated. Gabe’s memory backups are destroyed, rendering his death permanent. Fox checks into the Field of Reeds Center for Memory Recovery.

Therapists at Field of Reeds begin recovering pieces of Fox’s memories. Fox recalls that Gabe would download into the bodies of his clients to work out for them. Gabe had sex with a client’s fiancé while in the body of a client.Fox and Gabe began seeing a marriage counselor, Darius; they eventually separated.

Present-day Fox panics and attempts to run away from Field of Reeds. During his escape attempt, he learns that the entire memory center is a simulation. Fox recovers more memories. He sees scenes from his life with Gabe, mixed with scenes from the life of a man named Greg. In some scenes, Fox remembers meeting Gabe for the first time at a club. In other memories, he sees the life of Greg, an elderly janitor. Greg’s husband Zeke has died, and he begins dating a memory editor named Hector. After several months, Greg learns that Hector is a simulated personality based on Zeke. Initially he is upset, but Greg agrees to sign up for a NIL/E subscription; he erases the knowledge of Hector being artificial. However, the memory editing does not stick. Greg’s mental health declines and he undergoes repeated memory excisions. Greg brings a gun to his office and kills several staff members. Fox realizes that “Greg” was his own alter ego. After his separation from Gabe, Fox downloaded into Greg’s body, editing his own mind as a way to preserve his happy memories of their relationship.

Field of Reeds therapists provide Fox with a “scrape,” which is a fictionalized version of Gabe created from Fox’s memories. The scrape begins recovering Gabe’s memories, which should not be possible. Fox comes to believe that the scrape is truly Gabe, a belief which is backed up by Khadija’s theories of the nature of memories.

Fox sees Gabe’s childhood memories, including meeting Fox at Aaru. (This contradicts Fox’s memory of meeting Gabe at a nightclub as adults.) Eventually, a clearer picture of the past emerges. Fox met Khadija when they were both children on Aaru. She and Fox invented the technology of memory editing together. One day, Gabe assisted Fox when he was being bullied by a larger boy, and they began dating. Later, Gabe and Fox connected their memory nodes and shared memories between them. This explains why they can never truly forget each other, despite undergoing memory editing. Aaru was severely damaged by a hurricane and was evacuated in several stages. Fox refused to leave without Gabe. Khadija and Gabe tricked Fox into leaving anyway.

Fox and Khadija became high-ranking NIL/E leaders, but Fox could never recover from losing contact with Gabe. At this time, he created the Greg persona. After Greg murdered his coworkers, Khadija took Fox home and excised all memories of Gabe, Aaru, Greg, and even herself; she replaced his childhood with a story about being adopted off the island. When he and Gabe reconnected as adults, Fox had no memory of their childhood together.

Inspired by the connection between Fox and Gabe, Khadija decides to connect all NIL/E customers. Other executives oppose this plan, believing it would destroy humanity. NIL/E executives were responsible for the attack that killed Gabe and injured Fox; they hoped that Khadijah would die in the blast. At Field of Reeds, Fox and Gabe forgive each other and agree to work together to stop Khadija. They download into the real world, where they meet her. Fox uploads a copy of his and Gabe's memories to Khadija's satellite system. Gabe turns on a GPS tracker and allows NIL/E to find their location. Fox and Gabe hold onto each other as missiles bear down towards them.

In an ambiguous ending, Fox and Gabe continue marriage counseling sessions with Darius. It is shown that they have gone to therapy with him several times, each time failing to reconcile and then deleting the memories of their previous failures.

== Major themes ==
According to The Herald News, the novel explores the relationship between love and death. It makes frequent allusions to Egyptian mythology, including the Field of Reeds. It also draws inspiration from the Greek myth of Orpheus, in which the hero travels to the underworld to retrieve his deceased wife.

== Publication history ==
The novel began as part of a graduate school assignment in 2010; by 2012, Tavares expanded it into a full-length novel. He got an agent in 2015 and attempted to sell the novel for five years without success. After he wrote and published his 2022 novel A Fractured Infinity, Tavares substantially rewrote the draft of Welcome to Forever prior to its publication by Titan Books. The initial draft of the story focused on a heterosexual couple, which Tavares described as "almost like a business decision." Tavares told The Boston Globe "now that I’m older there’s things that I want to write about and have the courage to write about now that I don’t think I did ten years ago. It was a nice chance to have a do-over."

== Reception ==
Kristina Fontes of The Herald News praised the romance, writing that "Tavares beautifully describes the kind of forever love that people dream about, the yearning, and the deep, unseverable connection between two people who have always been meant to find each other." Maria Martin of Library Journal also praised the relationship between Fox and Gabe, writing that it "truly drive[s] the story." Martin concluded that the novel was a "fascinating ... kaleidoscope" and that this "high-stakes science fiction is sharp and tragic, hopeful and thrilling."
