= Beacon Communications (publisher) =

- Company type: Private
- Industry: Newspapers
- Founded: 1969
- Headquarters: 1944 Warwick Avenue, Warwick, Rhode Island 02889 United States
- Key people: John I. Howell Jr., publisher Richard G. Fleischer, general manager
- Products: Three weekly newspapers in Rhode Island
- Owner: Joy E. Fox
- Website: warwickonline.com

Beacon Communications is a privately owned newspaper publisher serving the suburban Rhode Island cities of Cranston, Johnston and Warwick.

Begun in 1969 by John Howell and Anthony Ritacco, as a vehicle to purchase the Warwick Beacon, the company was called Southern Rhode Island Publications until 1987. Howell took sole possession of the company in the 1980s, with Richard Fleischer coming on as the general manager.

In May 2024, Howell sold the company to Joy E. Fox.

== Properties ==
In addition to its three weekly newspapers, Beacon publishes the Penny$aver shopper in Cranston and Warwick; ChamberWorks, a business publication; and PrimeTime, a seniors-oriented monthly magazine distributed statewide. In 2018, Beacon purchased the weekly shopper publication, the Coventry Reminder.

Cranston Herald
Founded in 1922, the Herald was for a long time run by Rosalie Frost, a former Rockette who in the 1930s became a groundbreaking female journalist. She sold the paper to Beacon shortly after 1973, when the company had started a competing weekly, Cranston Today. The papers were merged under the Herald name. Today's Herald is a paid-subscription Thursday paper. Today, Tim Forsberg serves as editor while Howell remains as publisher. Its circulation was 1,786 in 2022.
Johnston Sun Rise
Beacon purchased the weekly Johnston Sun Rise in 2006. The paper is set up as a tabloid and is free of charge. It is also edited by Tim Forsberg. Its circulation was 4,500 in 2022.
Warwick Beacon
The company's flagship publication, the Warwick Beacon, dates back to November 19, 1953. It switched from weekly to twice-weekly publication (currently Tuesdays and Thursdays) in the 1970s. The sports section for the paper is run by a two-person team that also edits the sports section for the Herald. Under the direction of editor Matt Metcalf and assistant editor Jacob Maroco, the department covers a total of seven high schools between the three cities. Howell remains an active reporter for the paper, in addition to his role as editor-in-chief. Its circulation was 5,582 in 2022.

== Sisters and competitors ==
In addition to the former Cranston Today, the company has launched several other complementary products. Beacon founded the Coventry Townsman and Seekonk Sentinel in the early 1970s, later selling them to other owners; and Newport Today (now called Newport This Week).

Beacon's papers compete with The Providence Journal in the state's capital city, which borders Johnston and Cranston.

All three Beacon newspapers are members of Rhode Island Newspaper Group, an advertising sales consortium that consists of five weekly newspaper publishers in suburban Providence. Beacon is the coordinating office for the group; other members are Breeze Publications, East Bay Newspapers, Hathaway Publishing and Southern Rhode Island Newspapers.
