= The Chronicle (Willimantic) =

- Type: Daily newspaper
- Owner: RISN Operations
- Publisher: Jody Boucher
- Editor: Bradford Carroll
- Founded: 1877
- Headquarters: 375 A Tuckie Road North Windham, CT 06256
- Website: thechronicle.com

The Chronicle is a daily newspaper published in Willimantic, Connecticut, serving the Windham area and the eastern Connecticut counties of Windham, Tolland, and New London. It was founded in 1877 and currently publishes editions from Monday to Saturday, with an approximate circulation of 3,000. The Chronicle is owned by Rhode Island Suburban Newspapers.

The Chronicle historically had a daily circulation of approximately 10,000, but began to decline after the start of the 21st century, a phenomenon common to all U.S. daily newspapers. By 2018, the paper's circulation had dipped below 3,000. For almost all of its history, the newspaper was locally owned and operated by the MacDonald Bartlett Crosbie family of Willimantic. They sold it in May 2017 to Chronicle Media, L.L.C, a subsidiary of Central Connecticut Communications of New Britain, Connecticut, publisher of the Bristol Press and New Britain Herald daily newspapers and the Newington Town Crier and Wethersfield Post weekly newspapers. And on April 4, 2022, Central Connecticut Communications announced the sale of the Chronicle to Rhode Island Suburban Newspapers.

== History ==
=== Nineteenth century ===
Founders Nason W. Leavitt and Fayette Stafford had operated a printing business in the nearby town of Scotland since 1866 but in 1874 moved to the growing district of Willimantic in the town of Windham. During the previous three decades, six water-powered cotton mills had been built there along the falls of the Willimantic River and the district was growing into an industrial city (incorporated 1893) that by 1900 would contain the largest thread mills in world and the first in the world to have electrical lighting. The location of Willimantic directly between Hartford and Providence, as well as directly between New York City and Boston in the decades before the estuarial rivers of southern New England had been bridged, made the Willimantic a major regional railroad junction (50 to 100 trains per day at the beginning of the 20th century). As the city's mills and economy flourished, more than 800 ornate homes were built in the Prospect Hill section of the city and now listed on the National Register of Historic Places.

During 1876, Leavitt and Stafford published several editions of a monthly called the Willimantic Enterprise, including one in late December in which they announced that they would begin weekly publication. In the inaugural edition of the Enterprise, Leavitt and Stafford informed readers: “We promote nothing except to do our best to make it a paper which will be acceptable to every family. To make it emphatically a paper of news, not only of Willimantic, but of Windham County and the adjacent towns of other counties. To do this, we need a correspondent in every town or village within 20 miles of us to send us short items of news that is of interests in their own town, all such news to reach us as early in the week as possible.” In the second edition, Leavitt printed a critique from The Bridgeport Standard: “The Willimantic Enterprise has reached us and presents a neat appearance. Its columns are well-titled with spicy readable matter, and it looks as if it will be able to make its own way in the newspaper world.” However, Leavitt, a musician by avocation, wanted to leave the newspaper business and return to touring New England with the group Musical Stars of New York. In an interview with the Chronicle in 1903, Leavitt explained, “I had theatrical road fever, and early in 1879 I gladly turned over my equipment to my partner Fayette Safford, who very quickly formed a partnership with John A. MacDonald.”

Born in 1857, John Anthony MacDonald had learned the newspaper business at the weekly Windham County Transcript in the eastern Connecticut town of Danielson, near his birthplace of Brooklyn, Connecticut. A 1920 history of Windham described him as a “a promotor and a plunger, who took chances. He saved his money to go West and start his own weekly newspaper.” MacDonald's westward destiny took him all of 18 miles to Willimantic. He decided that the young city might support a second daily newspapers besides The Willimantic Journal, which had been established in 1848 and would ultimately cease publication on January 27, 1911. MacDonald initially took a job in the printing shop of C. C. Crandall on Main Street. MacDonald's name inadvertently first appeared in the Enterprise on October 4, 1878, when it was reported that he's been badly injured when his hand got caught in Crandall's press. Early in the fall of 1879, MacDonald bought half of the Enterprise from Safford plus invested additional capital to purchase new equipment: a steam-powered press. the Enterprise then moved to the H.C. Hall building at 60 Union Street and MacDonald became its editor and Safford its publisher.

On November 4, 1879, Safford informed readers, “It is nearly three years since the Enterprise was started as an experiment. It is now a demonstrated fact that Willimantic is big enough to support two newspapers. It has long been our desire to make the Enterprise better than it is, and to that end we have formed a partnership with Mr. J. A. MacDonald, a practical printer of skill and experience and in the course of a few weeks our paper will be enlarged to double the size, making it the largest paper in the county.” The first weekly edition of the Enterprise appeared on January 4, 1877. MacDonald and Safford changed its name to the Willimantic Chronicle two years later and began Monday through Saturday publication as an afternoon daily in 1891. Publication of an additional, weekly version of the Chronicle continued until 1902 until the advent of rural free delivery make it possible for readers to receive the daily newspaper the next day. Upon Safford's retirement, MacDonald became the newspaper's editor, publisher, and president.

MacDonald lived at the Commercial Hotel at the corner of Main and Church Streets in Willimantic where he met Vera Snow Bartlett, the widowed daughter of the hotel proprietor, Anson Augustus Snow. They married and MacDonald adopted her 13-year-old son, George Augustus Bartlett. In 1887, the newspaper company bought land across the street from the hotel, purchasing 22-26 Church Street from the Methodist Church, and constructed a three-story brick building which opened in October and where the newspaper would be published for the next 83 years. In that facility's initial years, each alphanumeric character of lead type was set by hand. In 1885, MacDonald began automating this laborious process by purchasing an early model of the Thorne typesetting machine, which required three men to operate it (one to work its keyboard, one to justify type into lines, and one to feed molten lead into the machine). In 1902, he replaced this with the first Mergenthaler Linotype automatic typesetter in northeastern Connecticut, a machine which required a single operator but output quadruple the amount of type. During its early years, the Chronicle was politically neutral, but in time MacDonald became a strong Democratic advocate.

Reminiscing during 1952, John A. Keefe, who joined the Chronicle as a printer at age 16, described MacDonald in 1899: “Mr. ‘Mac’ was slight in stature, a snappily dressed man, who even in poor health at that time, came to the office daily in his hansom carriage driven by Mr. Tew, his coachman. By then he had given up the editor's job, but he never gave up supervising the newsroom. He would wander through the composing room daily, sometimes to compliment us or to complain about the appearance of the previous day's paper, or to stop and show someone how to set type or to feed the press. Evidently he wanted to impress upon his employees that he had done it all, that he knew what he was talking about, that he had written the news and set in type and operated the press.” MacDonald, who had become increasingly ill with tuberculosis, spent his last day, December 4, 1904, at the Chronicle office. Arriving home at the end of that day, he died of a sudden pulmonary hemorrhage, age 47.

=== Early twentieth century ===
Upon MacDonald’s sudden death, his widow, Vera Bartlett MacDonald, succeeded him as president of the newspaper company, the first of three women in the family to hold that title. Her 31-year-old son George Augustus Bartlett, who worked in virtually every job in the newspaper, assumed his stepfather’s titles of editor and publisher, but not political inclinations. G. A. Bartlett was a staunch Republican who would represent the town of Windham in the Connecticut state legislature in 1906. However, Keefe would later remember, “George took scrupulous pains to see that the Chronicle remained a [politically] independent paper and that the Democrats receives as liberal treatment in the news columns as the G.O.P.” In February 1919, the 45-year old George Bartlett developed an ear infection that with days turned into fatal meningitis.

G. A. Bartlett's widow, Helen Carpenter Bartlett, succeeded her mother-in-law as president of the newspaper, and their 20-year-old son George MacDonald Bartlett (known as G. Donald Bartlett) went to work at the Chronicle. The widow Helen Bartlett in 1923 married Harry Newton Bullard, who became general manager of the newspaper. In 1925, G. Donald Bartlett was named its publisher. He succeeded his mother as president of the company upon her death in 1940. During World War II, so many Chronicle employees were drafted or left for work in defense plants that the in May 1942 the company had to close its commercial printing department for the duration of the war. In May 1945, G. Donald Bartlett, age 45, suffered a fatal heart attack at the newspaper.

=== Late twentieth century ===
The newspaper continued under the general management of Harry Bullard. The late G. Donald Bartlett left a widow and two daughters. The month after her father died, his eldest daughter, Lucy Mae Bartlett, began working at the newspaper during her secondary school summer vacations. Upon her accelerated graduation from Boston University's School of Management in 1951, she joined the Chronicle full-time, becoming its publisher the following year, a position she held for the next 40 years. She was also president of the company from 1952 until her death in 2012. In 1952, she married Arthur William Crosbie, Jr., who became general manager of the newspaper, replacing the retired Harry Bullard.

By 1970, the Chronicle had outgrown its 83-year-old building and melted lead printing technologies. The company purchased a building on the outskirts of Willimantic which had been used as a chicken hatchery on Old Columbia Road and there build a computerized newsroom and printing operation that used offset lithography rather than letterpress lead production. The city of Willimantic later named the location Chronicle Road. On January 21, 1971, the Chronicle printed its last edition using melted lead production and the next day relocated to its next facility. The newspaper officially changed its name from the Willimantic Chronicle to simply the Chronicle at that time. The old building was demolished in 1974 as part of the Willimantic Redevelopment Project and remains an empty lot adjacent to the Arthur W. Crosbie Memorial Parking Lot. He died of a sudden heart attack on September 23, 1976, age 56.

The late Arthur Crosbie left two sons, Vincent Bartlett Crosbie and Kevin Bartlett Crosbie. Vin Crosbie worked at the Chronicle as a compositor, advertising salesman, reporter, then assistant to the publisher during the late 1970s and early 1980s, but left to work for United Press International, Reuters, and News Corporation, and is now adjunct professor of postgraduate new media business at Syracuse University’s S.I. Newhouse School of Public Communications. He served as a director of the Chronicle Printing Company from 1992 to 2017. Kevin Crosbie joined the Chronicle in 1983 and later became assistant to the publisher, assistant publisher, and then co-publisher. In 1992, Kevin Crosbie became sole publisher upon his mother's retirement from that position. In that year, he supervised a $2 million remodeling and expansion of the newspaper's production equipment and presses. In 2000, the company also added three color printing units for its presses. Lucy Crosbie died of a short illness on January 1, 2012, age 82. Kevin Crosbie died of sudden heart attack on April 17, 2012, age 52.

=== Twenty-first century ===
Patrice Pernaselli Crosbie, Kevin Crosbie's widow, replaced him as publisher of the Chronicle and president of the company, publishing during the newspaper most difficult years for the U.S. daily newspaper industry so far in American history. Between 2000 and 2016, the industry's annual revenues decline from $42 billion to $19 billion and the ranks of the industry's employment nationwide were cut by 60 percent. For the Chronicle, those industry difficulties were made worse locally by the Willimantic region's economic woes. By the mid-1980s, all of Willimantic's thread mills had closed. The city's redevelopment project during the 1970s had proved to be a failure; most of the 20 downtown acres of downtown that had been leveled in hopes new development remained empty four decades later. Railroad passenger service through the city ceased during the 1980s and freight haulage to only one or trains daily. Interstate Highway 84, which had been planned to connect Hartford, Connecticut, and Providence, Rhode Island, through Willimantic, was during the 1970s instead built from Hartford to Worcester, Massachusetts. A six-mile section of the original route had been built skirting Willimantic, but after the highway was rerouted it resulted mainly in much of the existing regional and interstate traffic bypassing downtown Willimantic. In 1983, Willimantic itself disincorporated as a city, becoming again a district within the town of Windham. During the past four decades, this combination of the mill closures and resulting unemployment, failed city redevelopment, and reductions in Willimantic's tax base was economically devastating for regional businesses. By 2010, 17-percent of Willimantic and Windham residents lived below the poverty line.

=== Sale to Chronicle Media, LLC ===
In November 2016, Patrice Crosbie announced that the newspaper was being sold. On March 28, 2017, she announced that Chronicle Media, LLC, a subsidiary of the Central Connecticut Media, would be purchasing the newspaper. Central Connecticut Media are also the publishers of the Bristol Press, the New Britain Herald the Newington Town Crier, and Wethersfield Post. The sale was finalized on May 1, 2017.

=== Sale to Rhode Island Suburban Newspapers ===
On April 4, 2022, Central Connecticut Communications announced it had sold the Chronicle, along with The Bristol Press/The New Britain Herald, to Rhode Island Suburban Newspapers, publishers of The Westerly Sun, The Kent County Daily Times, The Call of Woonsocket, The Times of Pawtucket, Independent and Southern RI Newspapers. In 2025, the paper eliminated its Monday edition.

=== Addendum ===
Since its debut on January 4, 1877, the Chronicle has missed only five days of publication: three due to loss of electrical power after the 1938 New England hurricane, and for the funerals of publisher John MacDonald and George A. Bartlett.

During its history, the Chronicle has published two ‘extra’ editions: one on the day during 1901 when U.S. President William McKinley was assassinated and for September 11, 2001 terrorist attacks.

In addition to the eponymous daily newspaper, the Chronicle printing company is the commercial printer for a variety of publications in eastern Connecticut, including Eastern Connecticut State University's Campus Lantern weekly newspaper and was for decades the commercial printer of the University of Connecticut's Daily Campus newspaper.

Every edition of the Enterprise and all editions of the Chronicle until approximately 2010 are available on microfilm at the libraries of the University of Connecticut and Eastern Connecticut State University.

=== Notable alumni ===
Sports Editor Wells Twombly, later prize-winning sportswriter for The Houston Chronicle and Detroit Free Press and sports columnist for the San Francisco Examiner.

== See also ==
- List of newspapers in Connecticut
- List of newspapers in the United States
