= Selma Enterprise =

Newspaper serving Selma, California, U.S.

- Type: Weekly newspaper
- Owner: Santa Maria California News Media Inc.
- Founder: Walter T. Lyon
- Editor: Jenny McGill
- Founded: 1886 (as the Selma Irrigator)
- Language: English
- Headquarters: Hanford, California, United States
- Circulation: 5,000
- OCLC number: 27954166
- Website: selmaenterprise.com

The Selma Enterprise is a newspaper which serves the city of Selma, California and surrounding Fresno County. It is published weekly on Wednesdays and its estimated circulation is 5,000.

== History ==
On April 3, 1886, the first edition of the Selma Irrigator was published by Walter T. Lyon. A rival paper called the Selma Enterprise was first published on June 23, 1888. It was founded by editor S.J. Mathews and C.J. Walker, with backing from Jacob E. Whitson, who used it to promote his failed bid for State Assembly. The Enterprise Publishing Company was formed in 1889 and was managed by several people T.D. Calkins and H.E. Farley bought the Enterprise in January 1891. Mrs.V.I. Willis and her husband L.M. Willis bought the paper in October 1891 from H.B. Watson, and were the Enterprise's first long term owners.

In 1892, Lyon and his partner W.L. Chappell retired from the Irrigator and were succeeded at by J.J. Vanderburgh. He went on to publish the Irrigator for over three decades. In 1899, the Willis' leased the Enterprise to John W. Aiken and Frank H. Gill. Aiken bought the paper a year later. He operated it for 11 years until selling it in 1911 to Percy Fenton Adelsbachh, founder of the Kingsburg Recorder. Around that time Adelsbach was offered $10,000 in gold to start a liquor paper (a paper supporting saloons' interests), an offer which he refused. In 1912, Adelsbach was severely beaten by C.H. Brynelson for an editorial comment Adelsbach made about Brynelson. A year later Allyn O. Taylor took control of the Enterprise.

In 1916, Taylor sold the Enterprise to N.F. Douglas but regained ownership in 1917. A month later Louis F. Atwater, publisher of the Atwater Signal, sold his paper to buy the Enterprise from Taylor. L.F. Atwater died in May 1920. Telford Work, owner of the Parlier Progress and co-owner of the Del Rey Enterprise, then bought the Enterprise in August 1920 from M.L. Atwater, son of the former deceased owner. In 1926, Lowell Clark Pratt bought the Enterprise from Work. In 1927, Edward S. Byfield bought the Irrigator from Vanderburgh. On Feb. 1, 1929, amid the Great Depression, Pratt and Byfield merged their papers together as a cost saving measure. Pratt was made editor and Byfield became the business manager. That May, the two bought the Parlier Progress, and the Fowler Ensign in 1930.

In August 1931, Pratt gained national attention for an article he wrote criticizing a judge who Pratt thought handled a case with prejudice against Filipino defendants. A small race riot broke out on a vineyard and a judge fined seven Filipino men $10 while giving three white men suspended jail sentences. The judge cited Pratt for contempt of court for him writing an editorial arguing all defendants should have been treated equally. The charges were late dropped. During World War II, Pratt wrote in support of Japanese Americans who were discriminated against. He spoke to a state senate committee to defend the right of Japanese Americans to return to their homes after the internment of Japanese Americans ceased.

In 1947, Pratt and Byfield sold the Enterprise to Stauffer Communications. Gordon P. Martin was made the paper's editor and general manager. Pratt went on to work as an assistant journalism professor at San Jose State College and was the school's first director of public relations. He also wrote a book on the two decades he edited the paper called "A Weekly Miracle: How a California newspaper coped with the Great Depression, World War II and the evacuation of Japanese-Americans."

In 1953, Roy Brock, owner of the Kingsburg Recorder, became co-owner of the Enterprise with Benton Bowen and Edwin E. Jacobs, Jr. Brock won the Justus F. Craemer Newspaper Executive of the Year Award from the California Press Foundation in 1984. His son James Brock, who was also a publisher of the Enterprise, won the same award in 1999.

James Brock sold the Recorder and Enterprise in 2000 to Pulitzer, Inc., along with a free advertiser called the South County News. Pultizer was acquired by Lee Enterprises in 2005. Lee combined the Selma Enterprise with the Kingsburg Recorder in July 2015, consolidating printing operations at the Santa Maria Times printing location. In 2020, Lee sold the Enterprise and several other papers in Central California to Santa Maria California News Media Inc., a newly formed company led by a group of Canadian newspaper executives. In 2025, Lowell Clark Pratt was inducted into the California Newspaper Hall of Fame.
