= Pawtucket Public Library =

Public library in Rhode Island, US

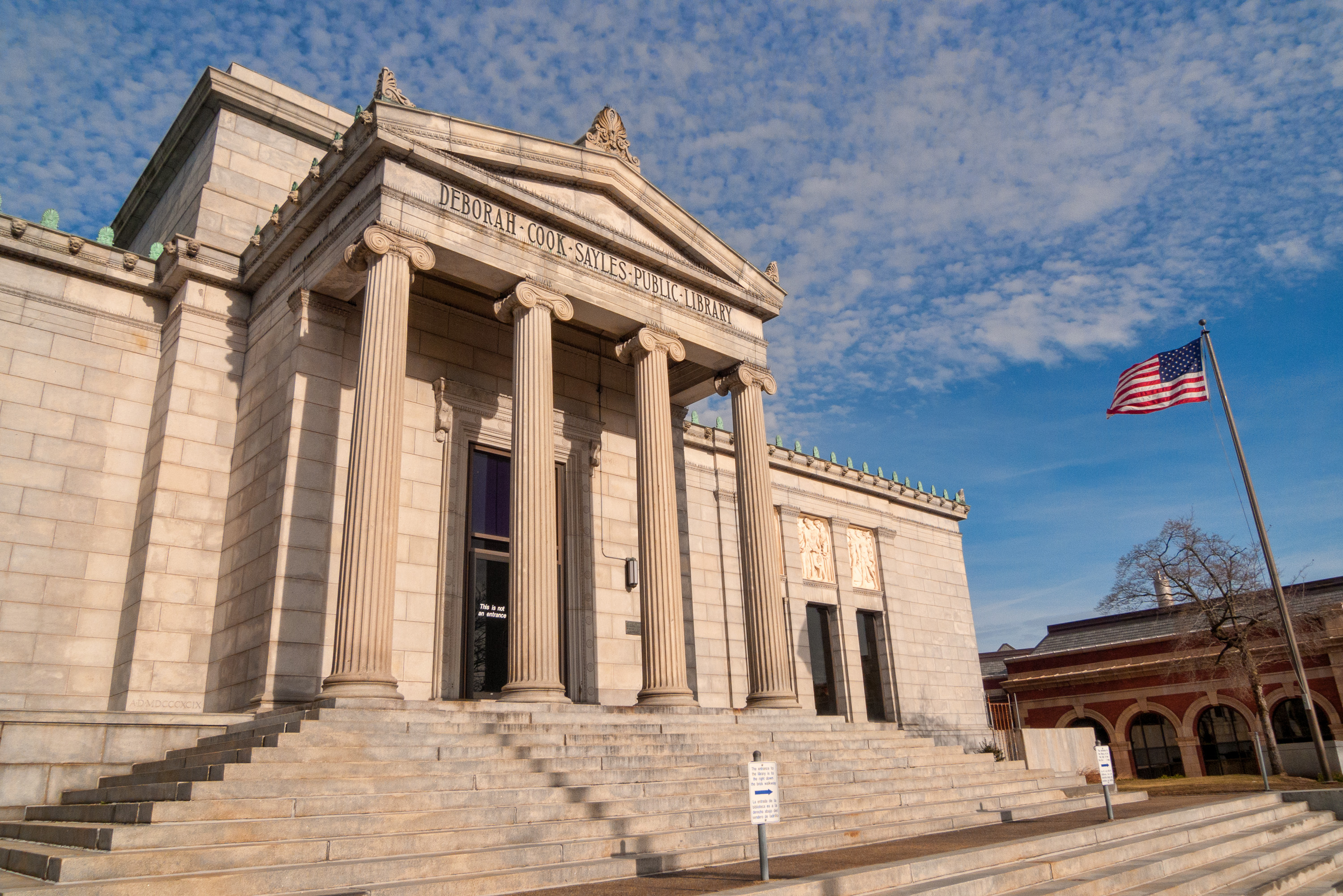
- Location: 13 Summer Street, Pawtucket, Rhode Island
- Type: Public library
- Established: 1852

Other information
- Website: www.pawtucketlibrary.org
- Deborah Cook Sayles Public Library
- U.S. National Register of Historic Places
- Location: Pawtucket, Rhode Island
- Coordinates: 41°52′44″N 71°23′7″W
- Area: 1 acre (0.40 ha)
- Built: 1899 (cornerstone laid); 1902 (completed)
- Architect: Cram, Goodhue & Ferguson
- Architectural style: Classical Revival
- NRHP reference No.: 75000002
- Added to NRHP: December 6, 1975
- Pawtucket Post Office
- U.S. National Register of Historic Places
- U.S. Historic district – Contributing property
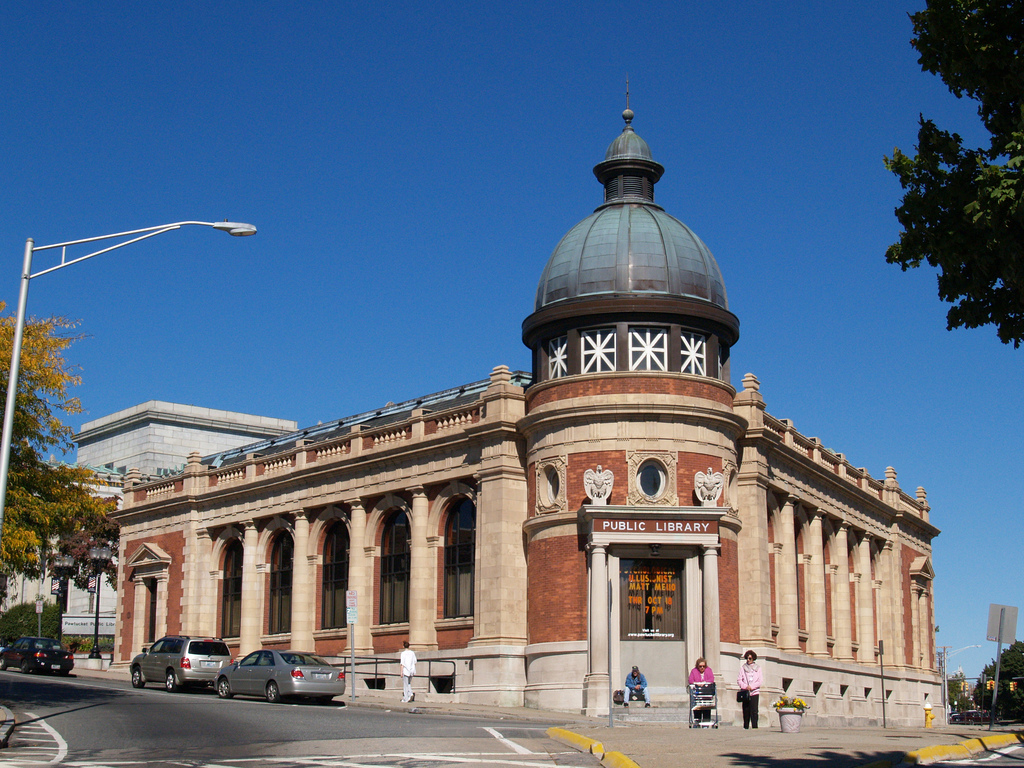
- Gerald S. Burns building, formerly the Pawtucket Post Office
- Location: Pawtucket, Rhode Island
- Coordinates: 41°52′42″N 71°23′4″W
- Built: 1896
- Architect: William Martin Aiken; James Knox Taylor
- Architectural style: Beaux Arts
- Part of: Downtown Pawtucket Historic District (ID06001227)
- NRHP reference No.: 76000226

Significant dates
- Added to NRHP: April 30, 1976
- Designated CP: April 5, 2007

The Pawtucket Public Library, formerly known as the Deborah Cook Sayles Public Library, is located at 13 Summer Street in Pawtucket, Rhode Island. Its main building, designed by Ralph Adams Cram and built in 1899–1902, and was a gift to the city from Pawtucket's first mayor, Frederic Clark Sayles, in memory of his recently deceased wife. In the late 1970s, an addition was built to connect the library to the neighboring Pawtucket Post Office, which had been built in 1896, had served as the post office until 1941, and which now forms part of the library's infrastructure as the renamed Gerald S. Burns Building.

== History ==
The library was founded as the Pawtucket Library Association in 1852. This group purchased private libraries around the city, and in 1876 gifted its 4,700 volumes to the town for public use. The library's first librarian was Minerva Sanders, who worked there until her retirement in 1910. Sanders was nationally recognized for her innovative services such as allowing open access to book stacks and permitting children to use the library.

By 1898, it became clear that the library needed a permanent home. A competition, held to select a design for a new library building, attracted entries from twenty-four architects. The winner was submitted by the Boston firm of Cram, Goodhue & Ferguson. The building's cornerstone was laid on Nov. 18, 1899, and the building opened on Oct. 15, 1902. The library was the first in the nation to allow patrons to browse the shelves directly, instead of requiring a librarian to retrieve books for them.

Architect Raymond Hood, a Pawtucket native, and sculptor Lee Lawrie, a team who much later became known for their work on Rockefeller Center, worked on the library building while in the employ of Boston architectural firm Cram, Goodhue & Ferguson.

An expansion to the library in the 1960s has been called "awkward and insensitive."

The library's main building was listed on the National Register of Historic Places in 1975; the connected former Pawtucket Post Office building was listed in 1976. Efforts began in 1979 to renovate and join the two buildings, with work completing in 1982. The post office building was dedicated as the Gerald S. Burns building, and together with the Deborah Cook Sayles Public Library building, became what is known today as the Pawtucket Public Library.

== Deborah Cook Sayles Public Library building ==
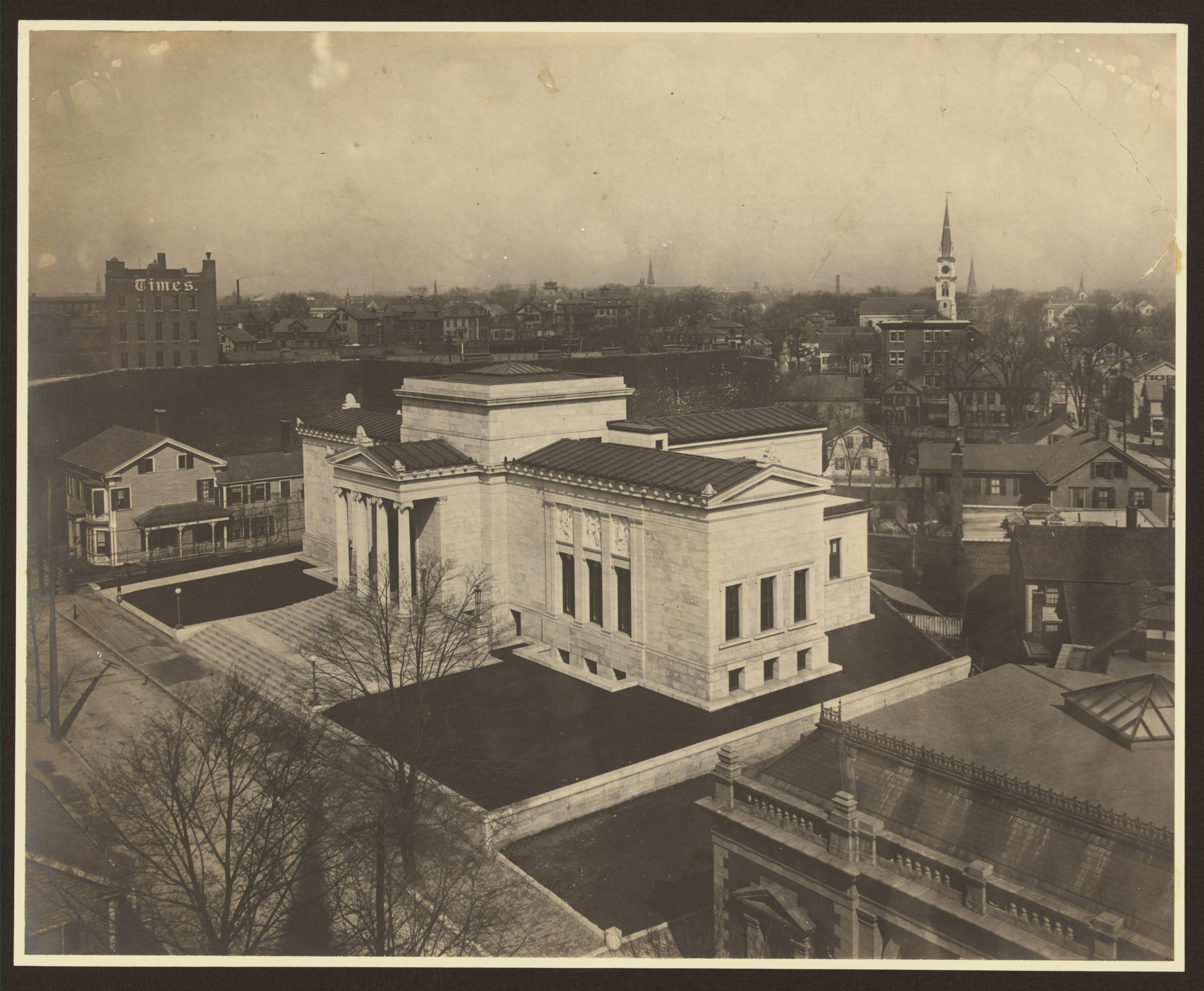
Pawtucket Public Library, 1901

The Classical Revival building features ionic columns, a pediment, egg-and-dart moldings, with high relief panels on its wings. The main façade is closely styled after the north porch of the Erectheion on the Acropolis in Athens, Greece.

=== Reliefs ===
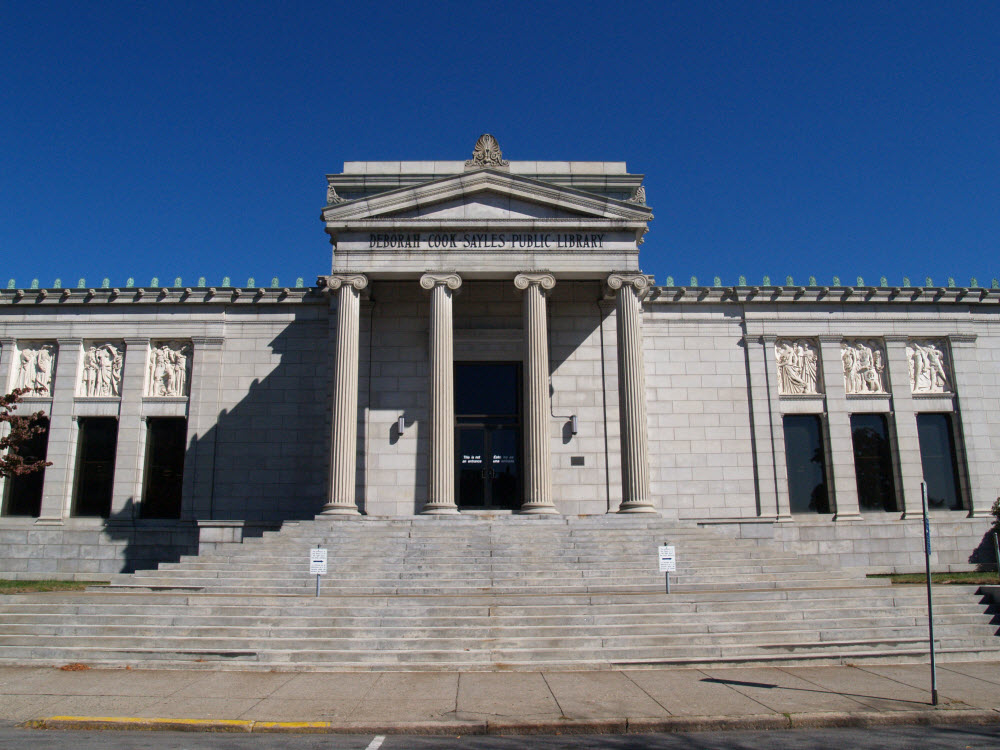
Reliefs above the six windows on either side of the pediment

The six bas-reliefs above the library windows depict scenes from literature and mythology. Depicted are scenes from the German epic poem Nibelungenlied, Dante's Inferno, and scenes from Shakespeare and King Arthur. Across the library's front doors are depictions of Moses, as well as Egyptian, Greek, and Roman figures of law and wisdom.

The sculptures were designed by Lee Lawrie and carved by Hugh Cairns. These reliefs were Lawrie's first ever commission. Lawrie would go on to become "one of the country’s foremost architectural sculptors."

== Gerald S. Burns building ==
Construction of the Pawtucket Post Office, on a trapezoidal site at the intersection of Summer and High streets, began in 1896 under the supervision of U.S. Treasury architects William Martin Aiken, and James Knox Taylor. Built of red brick on a granite base, and with a domed tower, the Beaux-Arts inspired building was completed in November 1897. The tower entrance, now closed, is framed by granite Doric columns supporting an entablature, on top of which sit two stone eagles. The principal facades radiate diagonally away from the entrance, each with five arched windows separated by 3/4 columns, each facade terminating at a pedimented secondary entrance.

The building served as the post office until 1933, when the City of Pawtucket acquired it, changed its use, and renamed it the Municipal Welfare Building. In the late 1970s, the city renovated the building again to convert it to library use, and to join it to the Deborah Cook Sayles Public Library. The building was later rededicated as the Gerald S. Burns Building.

The Burns Building was listed on the National Register of Historic Places in 1976.

== See also ==
- National Register of Historic Places listings in Pawtucket, Rhode Island
