= The Union Democrat =

Newspaper in Sonora, California

- Type: Daily newspaper
- Owner: RISN Operations
- Founder: Albert N. Francisco
- Founded: 1854
- Language: English
- Headquarters: 84 S. Washington St. Sonora, CA 95370
- ISSN: 2642-5467
- OCLC number: 28541808
- Website: uniondemocrat.com

The Union Democrat is a newspaper that serves the Sonora and Sierra Nevada foothills area of Tuolumne and Calaveras counties in California since 1854.

== History ==
On July 1, 1854, the first edition of The Union Democrat was published by Albert N. Francisco in Sonora, California. Corrydon Donovan became editor in June 1855, and was succeeded by Otis Greenwood in 1856. Francisco maintained ownership until his death in March 1867. D.C. Francisco then put the business up for sale. Charles Randall was a proprietor for a time.

John A. Van Harlingen started work at the Democrat at age 12 and went on to edit if for forty years. In 1912, John Van Harlingen was sued for libel by rival publisher A.D. Duchow, who owned the Republican-affiliated Tuolumne Independent. Duchow sought $25,000 in damages. After his death in 1928 at age 60, his brother F.W. Van Harlingen became the sole owner. In 1938, John C. Fuller bought the paper from F.W. Van Harlingen. Fuller leased the paper for a three year period to Donald I. Segerstrom and Ray Miners.

Segerstrom operated the paper for 15 years until selling it in December 1953 to husband-and-wife Hugh R. and Ruby Louise McLean. Two years later the paper was acquired from the McLeans by Luther E. Gibson, a state senator who owned the Vallejo Times Herald. Gibson expanded the paper to a daily. In June 1958, the Union Democrat purchased and absorbed rival paper the Sonora Daily.

In April 1959, the paper was purchased by Harvey C. and Helen McGee, who previously owned the Placerville Times. Harvey McGee operated the paper for 33 years his death in January 1998. In May 1998, Helen McGee sold the paper to the Oregon-based Western Communications. In 2004, Harvey McGee was posthumously inducted into the California Newspaper Hall of Fame. In 2019, the company declared bankruptcy, placing all of its properties, including The Union Democrat, up for sale. The Union Democrat was sold to RISN Operations.
