= Kingsburg Recorder =

- Type: Weekly newspaper
- Format: Digital-only
- Owner: Santa Maria California News Media Inc.
- Founder: Percy F. Adelsbach
- Editor: Jenny McGill
- Founded: 1904
- Language: English
- Headquarters: 300 West 6th Street; Hanford, CA 93230
- Circulation: 3,330
- OCLC number: 28493532
- Website: hanfordsentinel.com/community/kingsburg_recorder/

The Kingsburg Recorder is a weekly paper covering Kingsburg, California and the surrounding communities of Fresno County. It was founded in 1904 and combined with the Selma Enterprise in 2015.

== History ==
On Nov. 30, 1904, Percy Fenton Adelsbach published the first edition of the Kingsburg Recorder. It was around ten-pages and published weekly on Wednesdays. Two years later, Adelsbach helped found the Central California Press Association and served as its first secretary-treasurer. The Kingsburg Recorder was named after the defunct Fresno County Recorder, which Adelsbach previously ran. Adelsbach was anti-saloon and local saloon owners threatened to run him out of town. In 1908, he successfully lobbied the city council to pass ordinances to ban liqueur sales. That same year he founded the Porterville Recorder.

In February 1911, a young printer named Harrison Teas shot himself in the head at the Recorder's office. Adelsbach's wife found the body the following day. The apparent suicide was seen as unexpected, as Teas had not reportedly shown signs of despondence. That August, Adelsbach sold the paper to W.W. Willis. B.W. McKeen was then made editor. A few months later Adelsbach bought the Selma Enterprise. McKeen soon acquired the Recorder and operated it until 1928 when he sold it to Fred I. Drexler, who owned the Riverdale Free Press, Kerman News and West Side Advance of San Joaquin County.

In 1929, Drexler sold the Recorder to J. Boyce Smith and Albert L. Chadwick for $9,500. In 1937, Edwin E. Jacobs Jr. bought the paper from the two men and sold it in 1951 Roy Brock, former owner of the Fowler Ensign. Two years later Brock became a co-owner of Selma Enterprise. Brock won the Justus F. Craemer Newspaper Executive of the Year Award from the California Press Foundation in 1984. His son James Brock, who was also a publisher of the Recorder, won the same award in 1999.

James Brock sold the Recorder and Enterprise in 2000 to Pulitzer, Inc., along with a free advertiser called the South County News. Pultizer was acquired by Lee Enterprises in 2005. Lee combined the Selma Enterprise with the Kingsburg Recorder in July 2015, consolidating printing operations at the Santa Maria Times printing location. In 2020, Lee sold the Record and several other papers in Central California to Santa Maria California News Media Inc., a newly formed company led by a group of Canadian newspaper executives.
