= Narragansett Times =

Newspaper published in Wakefield, Rhode Island

- Type: Weekly newspaper
- Format: Broadsheet
- Owner: Rhode Island Suburban Newspapers
- Publisher: Southern Rhode Island Newspapers
- Editor: Seth Bromley
- Founded: 1858
- Headquarters: 187 Main St. Wakefield, Rhode Island 02879-3504 United States
- Circulation: 3,006
- ISSN: 1040-1938
- OCLC number: 12736501
- Website: ricentral.com/narragansett_times/

The Narragansett Times is a publication of Southern Rhode Island Newspapers that serves the Rhode Island towns of Narragansett and South Kingstown. It is published on Wednesdays and Fridays. Its estimated circulation is 3,006 copies.

== History ==
The paper was founded as the South County Journal in 1858 by Thomas P. Wells, Duncan Gillies, Isaac M. Church, and A.G. Palmer. The first issue was published on June 12, 1858, and the paper was printed only on Fridays. In June 1859, Gillies changed the name of the paper to the Narragansett Times and Thomas P. Wells named as the printer of the paper. Thomas P. Wells was succeeded as printer by David Dunlop in 1861, but the change of ownership was short-lived. In August 1864, Duncan Gillies returned to Wakefield by urgent request to resume printing the paper.

In 1880, a fire on the largest block in Wakefield burned and destroyed several businesses, including the printing offices of the Narragansett Times. The block was also occupied by a dry goods store, a grocery store, a tailor, a barber, a bowling alley, and a Masonic Hall. After recovering from the fire, Gillies continued to print the paper until his death in August 1881.

After Gillies' death, his sons took over the business and published under the name D. Gillies' Sons. John Gillies Jr. learned about printing from his father at age 7 or 8.

Frederick J. Wilson Jr. purchased the Narragansett Times from the Gillies family in 1946. Frederick, who had met John F. Kennedy when he was in the Navy and stationed in Chelsea, Massachusetts, received a loan from Kennedy of $2,000 (20 shares of stock) to help him buy the Narragansett Times. Because of this loan, John F. Kennedy was named vice president of the Board of the Narragansett Times Publishing Company, a post which he later resigned and sold his stock when he ran for office.

When Frederick J. Wilson Jr. died in 1978, his sons Frederick "Rick" III and Jamie Wilson took over as publishers. Rick and Jamie ushered in a time of expansion, hiring more reporters, improving the quality of writing and photography, increasing the circulation to 14,000 papers per week, and increasing the publication to twice weekly.

In 1983, the Narragansett Times and its sister paper, the Standard-Times of North Kingston, were purchased by Capital Cities Communications Corporation for an undisclosed price. Rick Wilson III remained as publisher of both papers, despite the new ownership, until he left the Times in 1995. Wilson left when the paper was purchased by Journal Register Company; He went on to create a competing newspaper company, South County Newspapers, which published the South County Independent and the Northeast Independent. After Wilson left, Betty Cotter, who had been co-editor of the paper under Wilson, left due to difficult conditions (cut staff, failure to pay overtime work, disagreements about advertising placements) caused by the paper's new owner, the Journal Register Company. The company was later sued, and settled for $15,000 for its failure to pay overtime to staff reporters and photographers. Michael Pare became the editor of the Times, instituting the paper's first weekly business section.

In 2005, David J. Dear became the publisher of the Times and all Southern Rhode Island Newspapers. Rhode Island Suburban Newspapers, a company started by David Radler's daughter, Melanie Radler, acquired Southern Rhode Island Newspapers, including the Times, as part of an 8.3 million dollar deal in 2007. David Radler, and his associate Conrad Black, were indicted for non-compete payments they received associated with the sale of Hollinger newspapers (Radler was charged with five counts of mail fraud and two counts of wire fraud). Weeks before David Radler's criminal trial began, his daughter Melanie filed paperwork to launch Rhode Island Suburban Newspapers and purchased 8 papers from the Journal Register Company, including the Times.

The current regional publisher for the Narragansett Times, and its news group Southern Rhode Island Newspapers, is Jody A. Boucher. The Managing Editor of Southern Rhode Island Newspapers is Gabrielle Falletta. Southern Rhode Island Newspapers are still owned by Rhode Island Suburban Newspapers.

== Awards ==
Numerous editors and writers for the Times editors are honored in the Rhode Island Press Association Journalism Hall of Fame. They are:

- Arline A. Fleming - Arline was the first Arts and Living Section editor of the Narragansett Times. She was inducted in April 2016.
- Frederick J. Wilson, III - Frederick "Rick" was the publisher of the Times after his father's death in 1978 until 1955. He was inducted in May 2010.
- Marcia Grann O'Brien - Marcia took over as editor in the 1990s and, under her management, the Times won a first place award in General Excellence. She was inducted in May 2010.
- Gerald Goldstein - Gerald began as a reporter, and later editor, for the Times during which time he helped the paper win several awards. He was inducted in November 2003.
- Frederick J. Wilson, Jr. - Fred purchased the Times in 1946 from the Gillies family and he pioneered the paper's technological change from letterpress to offset printing. He was posthumously awarded the "Goddard Award" for his contributions to excellence in journalism by the Rhode Island Newspaper Association. He was inducted in October 1987.

== National Attention ==
In 1985 the Narragansett Times was involved in a libel suit filed by a local flea market operator. The businessman claimed that an editorial column in the paper, which suggested that he might be selling stolen goods, had forced him to close his business. The Judge, Thomas Needham ruled in favor of the paper, saying that the accuracy of the editorial was not disputed and that the article was fair and reasonable.

In 1992, the Narragansett Times was heavily criticized for publishing photos of aborted human fetuses. The images were part of an 8-page anti-abortion circular/supplement included in the paper and paid for by Catholics for Life. The pictures were credited to two anti-abortion groups, the Center for the Documentation of the American Holocaust and Human Life International. Amid the ensuing controversy, executives for the Narragansett Times said that they did not know pictures of aborted fetuses would be published in the supplement, and they issued a front page apology on September 16, 1992.

In 1995, the co-editors of the Narragansett Times were featured in a piece by Gerald Carbone about employees who share a job with another employee to help manage work and home life. Betty Cotter and Mary Beth Reilly McGreen, co-editors of the Times, shared the job of editor of the paper and highlighted the challenges of such an arrangement.
