= Sun Publishing Company =

Newspaper

- Type: Subsidiary
- Industry: Newspapers
- Headquarters: 100 Main Street Westerly, Rhode Island 02891 United States
- Key people: Eliot White, President & Publisher; David Tranchida, VP, Editor; Shawn Palmer, Senior VP, Chief Revenue Officer
- Products: The Westerly Sun and four weeklies in Connecticut and Rhode Island
- Parent: RISN Operations

Sun Publishing Company is a daily and weekly newspaper publisher in southwest Rhode Island and southeast Connecticut, United States. It is a Westerly, Rhode Island–based subsidiary of RISN Operations.

The company's flagship publication is a daily, The Westerly Sun.

Sun Publishing's four weeklies include three covering Rhode Island towns, based in the Westerly headquarters—the Charlestown Press, Westerly Pawcatuck Press and Wood River Press—and one Connecticut publication, the Mystic River Press, based at 15 Holmes Street, Mystic, Connecticut.

- Charlestown Press. Covering Charlestown, the villages of Kenyon and Shannock in Richmond, and parts of South Kingstown. Total-market postal delivery every Thursday.
- Mystic River Press. Covering Groton, North Stonington and Stonington, Connecticut, including the villages of Mystic, Old Mystic and West Mystic. Free "requester" postal delivery every Thursday.
- Westerly Pawcatuck Press. Covering Westerly (including the village of Bradford) and the Pawcatuck section of Stonington, Connecticut. Total-market carrier delivery every Wednesday.
- Wood River Press. Covering Exeter, Hopkinton and parts of Richmond, Rhode Island—including the villages of Ashaway, Carolina, Hope Valley, Rockville, West Kingston, Wood River Junction and Wyoming. Total-market postal delivery every Thursday.
