= Minerva Sanders =

American librarian

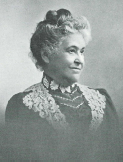
- Born: February 11, 1837; Marblehead, Massachusetts, US
- Died: March 20, 1912 (aged 75); Pawtucket, Rhode Island, US
- Occupation: Librarian

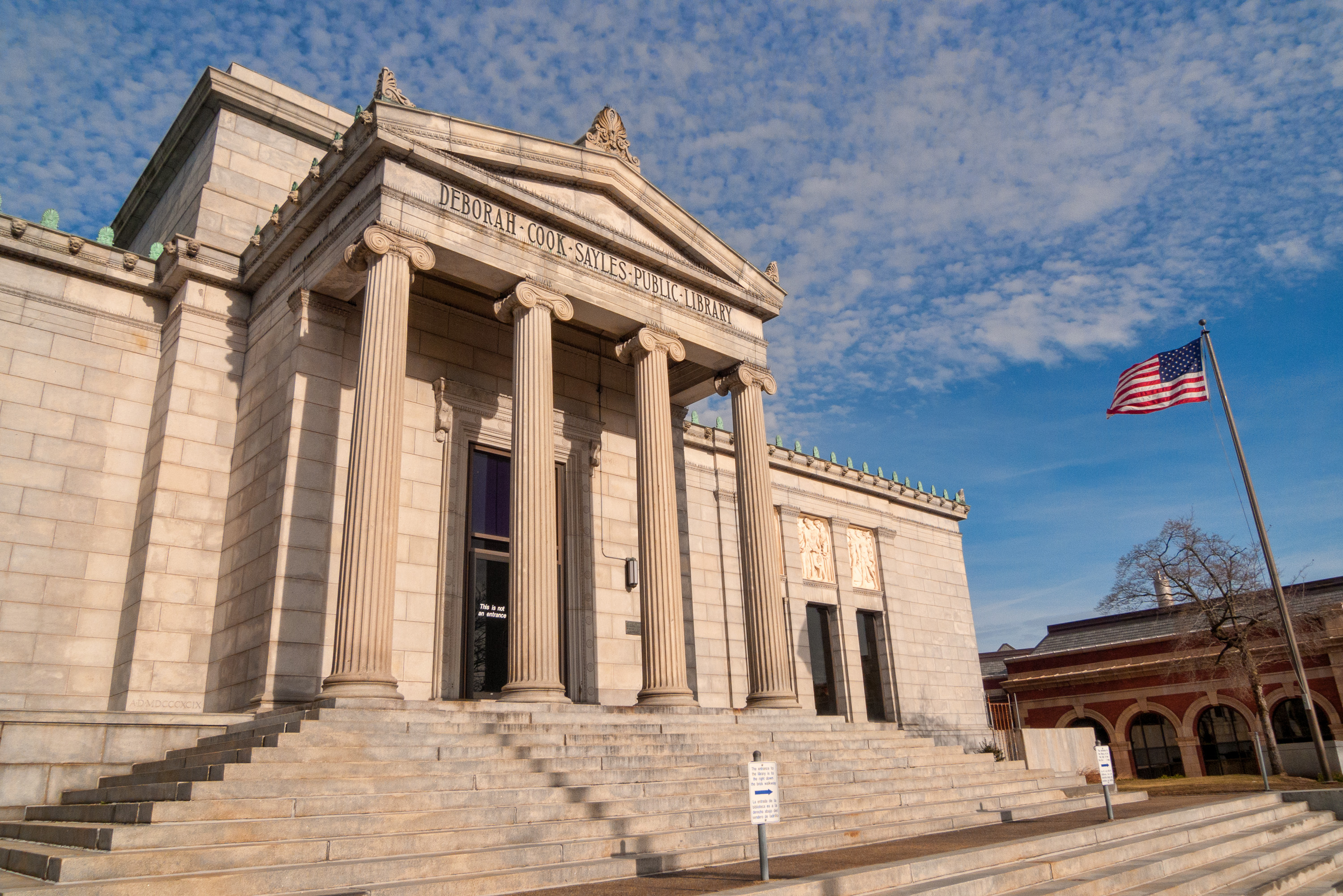
Deborah Cook Sayles Public Library

Minerva Sanders (February 11, 1837 – March 20, 1912) was the first librarian of the Pawtucket Free Public Library in Pawtucket, Rhode Island. Sanders earned a national reputation for innovative library services, including allowing open access to book stacks, opening the library on Sundays to accommodate working people, and permitting full library privileges for children.

== Life and library work ==
Minerva Amanda Sanders was born February 11, 1837. She was widowed at age 26 and was a teacher before beginning library work.

Sanders oversaw the Pawtucket subscription library before the free public library officially opened, and worked at the Pawtucket Free Public Library from its opening in 1876 until she retired in 1910. She was the chief planner of the new Deborah Cook Sayles Memorial Library building, which opened in 1902.

Sanders found that work with children was "the most important, and in its results, the most satisfactory of all library work." Sanders was disturbed by seeing children who wandered the town unaccompanied by adults, as well as the young age of children who worked in the Pawtucket textile mills. While children were typically forbidden from entering public libraries, Sanders welcomed them in; she was likely the first public librarian to allow children under 12 to use library books. In 1877 she created a separate area for children in the library; she sawed legs off tables and chairs to create child-sized furniture and provided picture books for children to inspire their imaginations. Concerned with the moral education of the children of Pawtucket, she encouraged her young patrons to review a scrapbook featuring newspaper clippings describing how boys were lured into lives of crime by reading sensational fiction, claiming that after twenty minutes her patrons would give up reading the types of books she described as "pernicious trash". She worked to find positive channels for youthful energy, saying she wanted children to "understand that even they are of use in a community".

Sanders also broke with tradition in allowing open access to library shelves, a practice that was contested by most other librarians at the time as a risk to the taxpayer's investment. She oversaw the collection's retrospective conversion to the Dewey Decimal Classification and taught children and their teachers to use it.

She believed that understanding the community she was working with was crucial to her work. Sanders asked library trustees for additional staff so she could have time to "mingle with the people, to learn their habits and tastes, and to direct their reading (especially the young)". Under her leadership, the Pawtucket Free Public Library was one of the earliest libraries to open on Sunday so the many Pawtucket mill workers who worked six days a week could visit. After 30 years of heading the library, Sanders was affectionately known as "Mawtucket of Pawtucket" by the adults and "Auntie Sanders" by the children of her community.

Sanders was an active participant in librarianship in the United States: attending and speaking at American Library Association conferences, authoring Library Journal articles, and helping to found the Rhode Island Library Association. She was a strong advocate for cooperation between libraries and schools, advocating for class visits to libraries and providing collections of books to teachers.

Her health declined in later years and she retired in 1910; she died March 20, 1912.
