= Porterville Recorder =

Daily newspaper in Porterville, California

- Type: Daily newspaper
- Format: Broadsheet
- Owner: R.I.S.N. Operations, Inc.
- Founder: Percy F. Adelsbach
- Publisher: Bill Parsons
- Founded: May 21, 1908
- Language: English
- Headquarters: 115 E. Oak Avenue; Porterville, California 93257; United States
- Website: recorderonline.com

The Porterville Recorder is a daily newspaper in the town of Porterville, California.

== History ==
On May 21, 1908, Percy F. Adelsbach published the first edition of the Porterville Recorder. Robert Angus Mack was the paper's first editor and John C. Sieb worked as its printer at that time. Adelsbach also owned the Kingsburg Recorder. He sold the paper that August to a group of local businessmen. Most of the stock was sold by Rev. Madison Slaughter to manager Leslie McAuliff and editor John T. Goolrick in 1909.

McAuliff bought out Goolrick in 1910. In 1920, McAuliff and W.B. Knapp sold their interests in the paper to John Ralph Bell. H.W. Lambdin retained his interests in the business. Bell died a year later. His widow Olive A. Bell then owned and operated the paper for the next two years.

The Recorder was then bought by William H. Hornibrook in 1923, C.L. Day in 1924, and Homer W. Wood in 1927. Wood previously owned the Morning Democrat in Salinas followed by The Petaluma Daily Courier. He was also known as the "father of Pacific Coast Rotary" and helped organized the world's second Rotary club in San Francisco.

Graham M. Dean bought the paper from Wood in 1960. Dean previously owned the Reno Gazette and Ashland Daily Tidings. He operated the Recorder until he sold it in 1974 to Freedom Communications and died later that year. In 1984, Wood was posthumously inducted into the California Newspaper Hall of Fame. In 2013, Freedom sold the paper to Rhode Island Suburban Newspapers.
