= Pawtucket Times Building =

- U.S. National Register of Historic Places
- U.S. Historic district – Contributing property
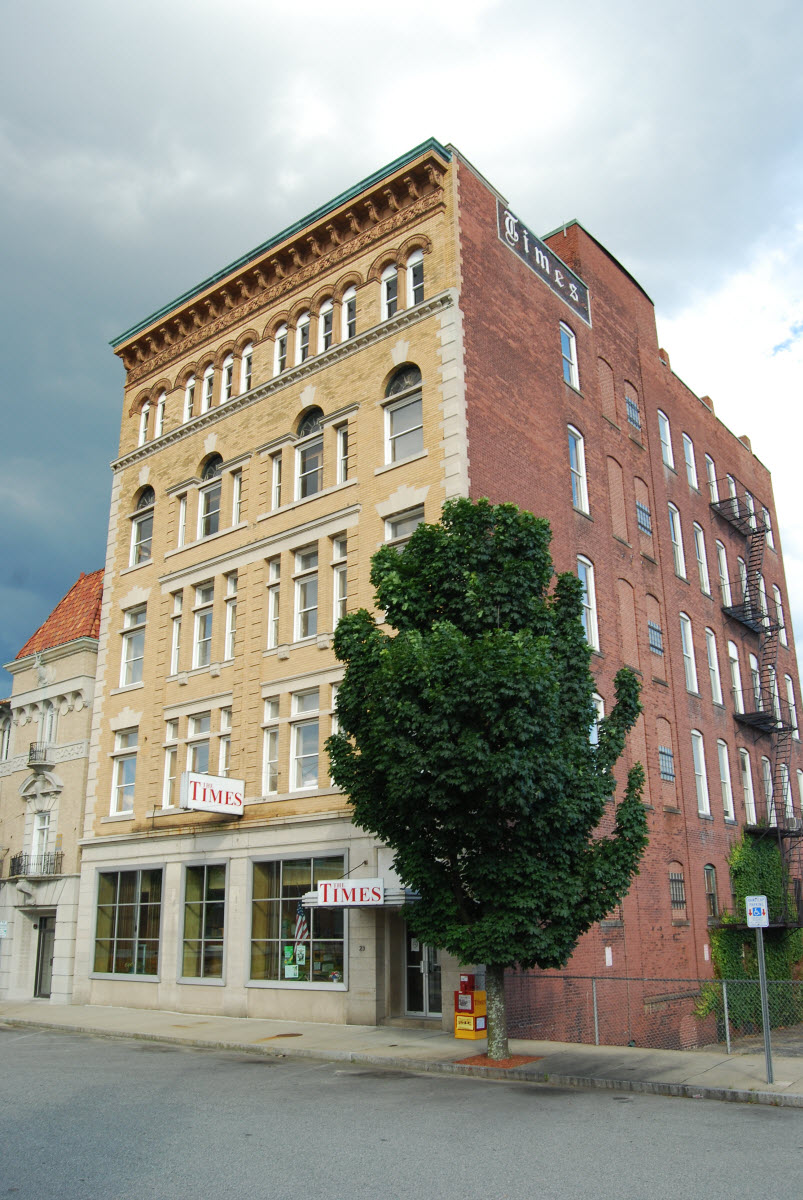
- 23 Exchange Street, Pawtucket Times Building, July 2009

- Location within Rhode Island Location within the United States
- Location: Pawtucket, Rhode Island, US
- Coordinates: 41°52′46″N 71°23′10″W
- Built: 1896; 1922
- Architect: William R. Walker & Son (1896); Bellows & Aldrich (1922)
- Part of: Downtown Pawtucket Historic District (ID06001227)
- MPS: Pawtucket MRA
- NRHP reference No.: 83003842

Significant dates
- Added to NRHP: November 18, 1983
- Designated CP: April 5, 2007

The Pawtucket Times Building is a historic building at 23 Exchange Street in the historic central business district of Pawtucket, Rhode Island. It was formerly the home of the Pawtucket Times newspaper.

== History ==
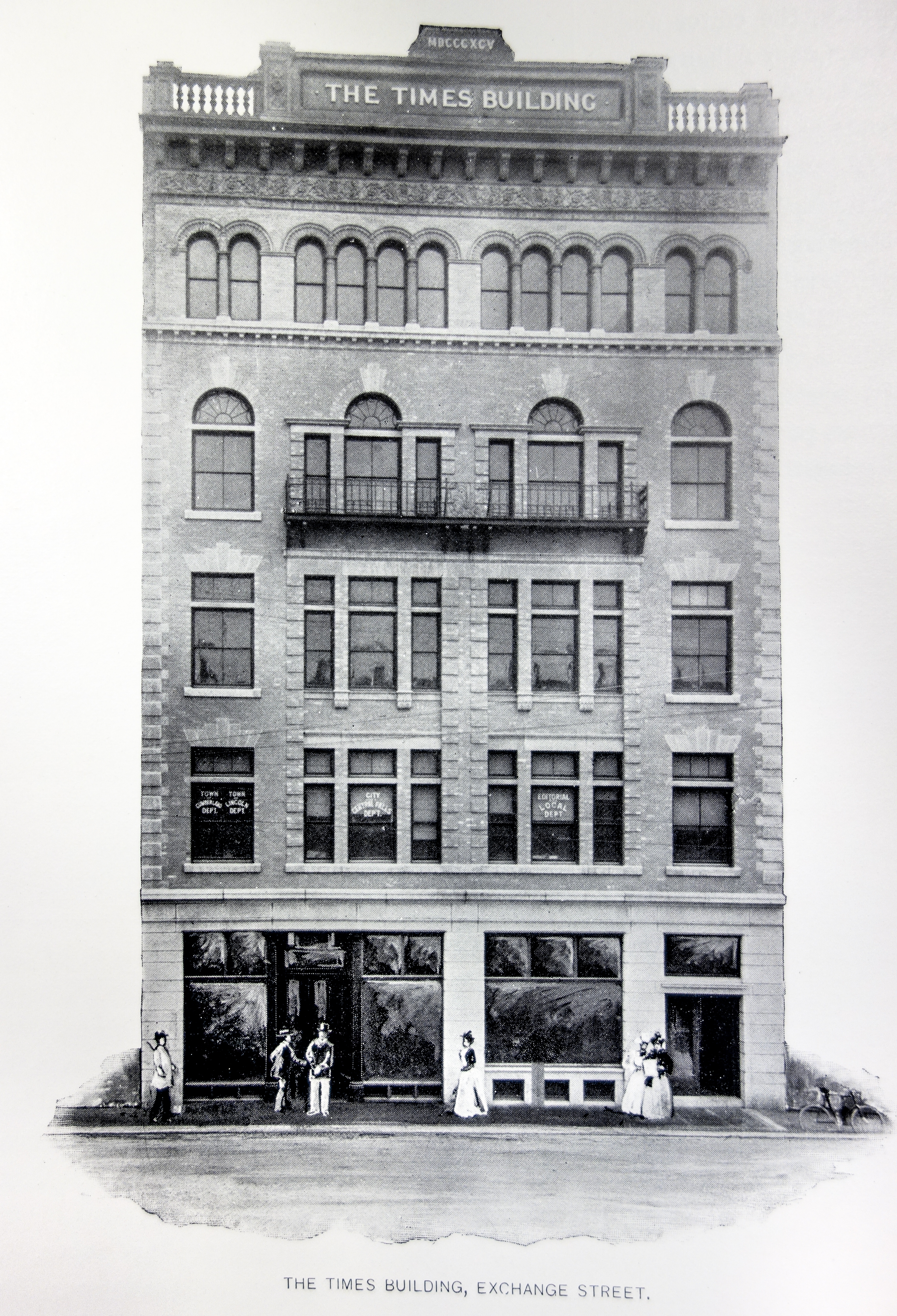
Pawtucket Times Building, 1897

This five story masonry building was erected to house the facilities of the Pawtucket Times, which was founded in 1885. The building was designed by architects William R. Walker & Son in 1895 and completed in 1896. In 1922 the Times completed a utilitarian annex facing North Union Street. This was designed by Bellows & Aldrich of Boston. The complex was reconfigured in 1950.

In 2007 the owners of the Times, which by then was occupying only the first floor, put the building on the market. It was nearly sold several times and was considered as the new home for the Gamm Theatre. In 2019 the building was acquired by the owner of the Pawtucket Armory and the Times moved out. The new owner never moved ahead with redevelopment plans and the still-vacant building was placed back on the market in 2023.

The building was listed on the National Register of Historic Places in 1983.

== Architecture ==
The main facade is faced in yellow brick with limestone trim. The first floor is divided into four bays, paired in size with the left one of the pair larger than the right. The entrance occupies the narrow bay on the far right, while the other bays are filled with windows and divided by limestone-faced piers. The next three floors also have four bays, but they are organized in mirror-image pairs, with a larger central bay with tripled windows flanked by an outer bay with a single sash window. The lintel treatments vary by floor; the windows on the fourth floor are round-arched. The fifth level is also organized in mirror-image paired bays, with the central bays each housing a row of four, small round-arch windows, and the outer bays only having two such windows. The building is topped by an elaborate dentillated cornice.

== See also ==
- National Register of Historic Places listings in Pawtucket, Rhode Island
- The Times (Pawtucket)
