= Downtown Pawtucket Historic District =

Historic district in Rhode Island, United States

- U.S. National Register of Historic Places
- U.S. Historic district
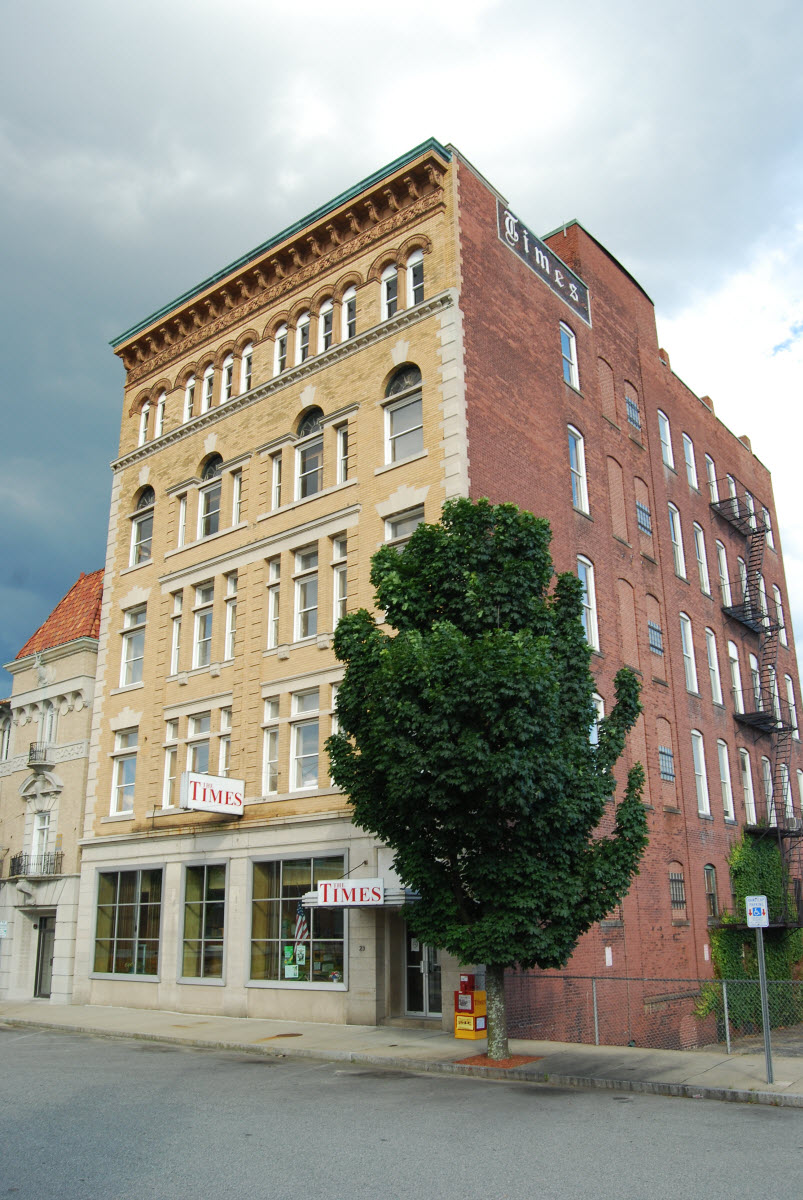
- The Pawtucket Times building

- Location within Rhode Island Location within the United States
- Location: Roughly bounded by Broad St., Grant St., High St., East Ave. Ext. and Main St., Pawtucket, Rhode Island
- Coordinates: 41.87932°N 71.38471°W
- Area: 14 acres (5.7 ha)
- Built: 1874
- Architect: multiple
- Architectural style: Italianate, Queen Anne, et al.
- MPS: Pawtucket MRA
- NRHP reference No.: 06001227
- Added to NRHP: April 05, 2007

The Downtown Pawtucket Historic District encompasses a major portion of the central business district of Pawtucket, Rhode Island. The city's downtown was developed primarily between 1871 and 1930, covering the period when it grew to become the second-largest city in the state (behind neighboring Providence). The district is irregularly shaped, including properties on Montgomery Street south of Manchester, and properties on Exchange, North Union, and Summer streets between Broad and High Streets, as well as a few properties on Main Street and Maple Street east of Park Place. It includes 50 buildings on 14 acres (5.7 ha), built in a cross-section of architectural styles from the late 18th century to the mid-20th century, although the main exterior construction material is brick. Most of the buildings are commercial in use, although there are three houses and a church included in the area.

The district was listed on the National Register of Historic Places in 2007. Four buildings in the district were previously listed: the Elks Lodge Building, the Pawtucket Times Building, the Pawtucket Post Office, and the Deborah Cook Sayles Public Library.

== See also ==
- National Register of Historic Places listings in Pawtucket, Rhode Island
