= Rhode Island Conservation Districts =

Settlement

The Rhode Island Conservation Districts consist of three districts; Northern, Southern and Eastern. They work with the United States Department of Agricultures Natural Resources Conservation Service (NRCS) to deliver technical assistance to the people of Rhode Island embarked on conservation projects. The conservation districts of the State of Rhode Island are a subdivision of state government established under state law to carry out programs for the conservation and wise management of soil, water and related resources. Professional staffs in each of the three offices report to volunteer boards of directors. The Southern Rhode Island Conservation District has offices located in Wakefield, Rhode Island.
