= Wells Twombly =

American sportswriter

- Born: October 24, 1935; St. Johnsbury, Vermont, U.S.
- Died: May 30, 1977 (aged 41); Redwood City, California, U.S.
- Occupation: Sportswriter
- Years active: 1956-1977
- Spouse: Margaret Twombly
- Children: 4
- Awards: California Sports Writer of the Year (1971, 1972, 1973) United Press International Awards (1966, 1967, 1968)

Wells Twombly (October 24, 1935 – May 30, 1977) was an award winning American sportswriter and author based in the Bay Area. He was the author of four books and more than 100 magazine articles for the New York Times Magazine, Esquire, and Playboy. Twombly was known best for his liberal use of prose and an iconoclastic attitude towards the sporting establishment. He died on May 30, 1977, in Redwood City, California.

== Early life ==
Wells Twombly was born in St. Johnsbury, Vermont, on October 24, 1935. He began writing in 1956 while at the University of Connecticut, where he earned a bachelor of arts in English and History. While at UConn he also met his future wife Margaret Zera and moved from the school paper to The Willimantic Daily Chronicle. He served as sports editor at The Chronicle until 1958.

== Career ==
Twombly's sports-writing led him to roles in California, Texas, and Michigan. Over the course of his career, Twombly's articles spanned across football, golf, baseball, boxing, and bear-wrestling.

Twombly argued that he and his fellow writers were at "war with the television” and the old “KISS (Keep it Simple Stupid)” newspaper style. He insisted that, unlike television, words could “take [the audience] places where even the damned camera [couldn’t] go”.

Rather than engaging in hero worship of athletes or extolling the virtues of the home team, the college-educated Twombly raised questions about the role of athletics in American society. While some readers found his consciously literary prose enigmatic and confusing, Twombly defended his style, asserting: "I try to be as literate as I can be. Anybody who writes down to a reader in this age of higher education is living in the past."

In his writing, Twombly was known best for his irreverent attitude towards the traditional sporting establishment and for a writing style his New York Times obituary called "both literate and literary." During one particular interview with Reggie Jackson, when given a series of non-answers, Twombly cut the interview short saying “I’m as good a writer as you are a home-run hitter. If you want me to write about you, you’ll have to call me.”

== 1976 Olympics and Soviet cheating ==
During the 1976 Olympics in Montreal, Twombly broke a major story exposing Russian cheating at the games. He discovered that the Russian pentathlete, Boris Onischenko, had rigged his fencing equipment to allow him to falsely trigger a touch without making any contact on his opponent. Twombly’s discovery of the story was largely credited to a hangover. While the rest of the press staff covering the games attended the early morning cycling events, Twombly slept in; he claimed to have only been stirred out of bed by a “ruckus nearby” that turned out to be caused by Onischenko’s accusers.
