= The Newport Daily News =

Newspaper serving Newport County, Rhode Island

- August 15, 2011 cover of The Newport Daily News.
- Type: Daily newspaper
- Format: Broadsheet
- Owner: USA Today Co.
- Editor: Will Richmond
- Founded: 1846
- Headquarters: 272 Valley Road, Middletown, Rhode Island
- Circulation: 5,393 (as of 2018)
- Website: newportri.com

The Newport Daily News is a six-day daily newspaper serving Newport County, Rhode Island. It publishes in the mornings on weekdays (Monday through Friday) and in the morning on Saturdays. The Daily News was the state's largest family-owned newspaper until it was purchased by Gatehouse Media in 2017.

== History ==
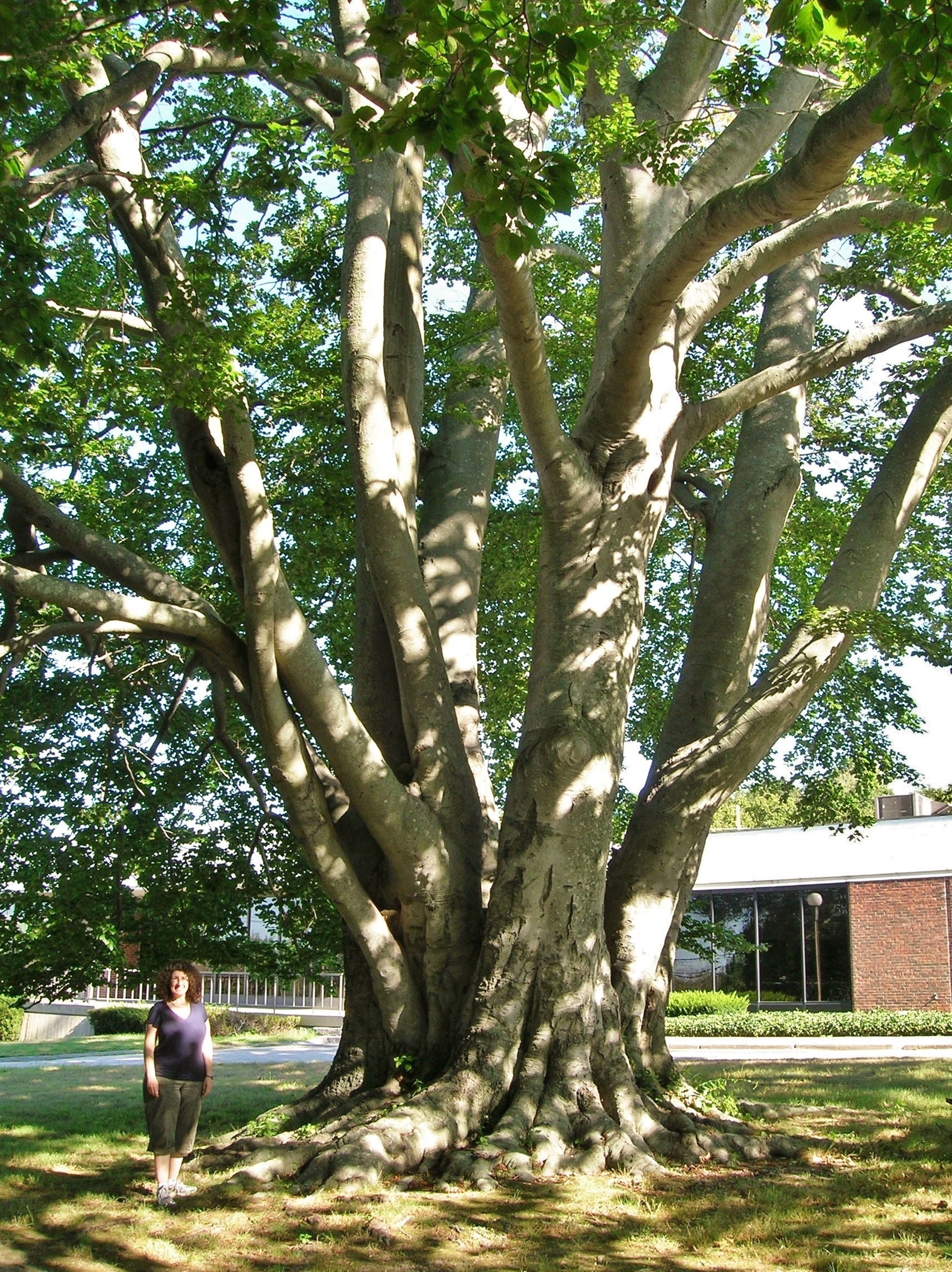
Large European beech in front of The Newport Daily News

Until its sale to Gatehouse Media, the Daily News had been locally owned since it was founded in 1846. It was named "Newspaper of the Year" by the New England Newspaper Association in 1991, 2001 and 2004.

In 1970, the newspaper moved from Thames Street in downtown Newport to an office on Malbone Road in the northern part of the city, shortly after the completion of the nearby Claiborne Pell Newport Bridge. In 2018, Sherman Publishing put the Malbone Road property up for sale; the paper continued to be based out of the building until new office space could be found. In March 2019, the paper's office moved to Middletown, Rhode Island. Journalist Jim Gillis was a reporter for the Daily News from 1980 to 2013 and was well known on Aquidneck Island for his weekly "Spare Change" column, which he continued to write until his death in April 2023.

== Sherman Publishing ==
Edward A. Sherman Publishing Company, the family-owned publisher of the Daily News, also prints three free weekly newspapers in southern Rhode Island: Mercury, a Wednesday alternative weekly covering Bristol, Newport and Washington counties; the Friday Newport Navlog, the U.S. Navy's oldest base newspaper (founded 1901), covering Naval Station Newport; and Ocean State Independent, mailed to non-Daily News subscribers on Aquidneck Island.

The company also owned South County Newspapers, which publishes The Independent, a weekly newspaper covering the towns of South Kingstown (including the villages of Kingston, Peace Dale and Wakefield and the University of Rhode Island), Narragansett and North Kingstown. The Independent, formerly based in Wakefield, now shares office space with the Newport Daily News and Mercury in Newport.

All of Sherman Publishing's publications were purchased by Gatehouse Media, which also owns The Providence Journal, in November 2017.

In June 2018, Gatehouse sold South County Newspapers, The Independent and South County Life magazine, to Rhode Island Suburban Newspapers. In November 2018, publisher William Lucey and editor-in-chief Jon Zins both departed from the newspaper.

== Newport Mercury ==
The Mercury, another publication of the Daily News, traces a lineage as one of the oldest newspapers in the USA. The history of that publication dates back to 1758 when the widow and son of James Franklin, Benjamin Franklin's brother, established the Newport Mercury as a weekly publication, making Ann Franklin the first woman in the Colonies to publish and edit a newspaper.

The Mercury was published regularly up to the time the British Army occupied Newport in December 1776 when the press and types were buried. (The press, also used by Solomon Southwick to print copies of the Declaration of Independence in 1776, can be seen in the Museum of Newport History in downtown Newport.) After the British evacuated Newport in November 1779, the Mercury was issued again.

The Mercury was the first paper to publish poetry by an African American woman, Phillis Wheatley.

The Mercury was acquired by Edward A. Sherman, owner of the Newport Daily News in 1928. It continued as a subscription weekly published by the Newport Daily News until March 2005, when it was relaunched as a free alternative newsweekly under the editorship of Janine Weisman. The current iteration of the paper covers arts, entertainment, food and culture in Newport County.

Since the Mercury ceased publication during the Revolutionary War and was acquired by Sherman in 1928, Hartford Courant and the Mercury's publisher have a longstanding debate over which is older. The Courant has long identified itself as the longest "continuously published" newspaper in the United States and most scholarly articles attribute it as such.

In April 2018, it was announced by editor Janine Weisman that the Mercury would no longer publish a weekly print edition, effective with the April 27 issue. The paper would continue as a monthly insert of the Newport Daily News. The first of these new monthly Mercury editions was published on June 7, 2018 as both an insert in the Newport Daily News and as a stand-alone free newspaper. This monthly edition of the Mercury was no longer being published by the time Weisman left the Daily News in August 2019.

== Prices ==
As of October 2020, The Newport Daily News prices are:

Digital edition – $9.99 monthly or $59.99 per year
Print edition delivery and digital edition $32 for eight weeks
