= Warren Times-Gazette =

Weekly newspaper in Bristol County, Rhode Island, USA

- Type: Weekly newspaper
- Format: Broadsheet
- Owner: East Bay Newspapers
- Editor: Ted Hayes
- Founded: 1866
- Headquarters: 1 Ford St, Bristol, Rhode Island 02809
- Circulation: 1,458 (as of January 2022)
- OCLC number: 25264483
- Website: eastbayri.com/warren/;

The Warren Times-Gazette is a weekly newspaper in Bristol County, Rhode Island covering local news, sports, business and community events. It is owned by East Bay Newspapers.

== History ==
The Warren Gazette was established in 1866 by retired sea captain James W. Barton who had experience working in the printing office of the Providence American before he became a shipmaster. Henry H. Luther was the first editor of the paper; he was succeeded by George H. Coomer, a locally known writer and poet. Coomer's work is showcased in the Charles Whipple Greene Museum in Rhode Island.
