= Emily Bell =

British academic and journalist

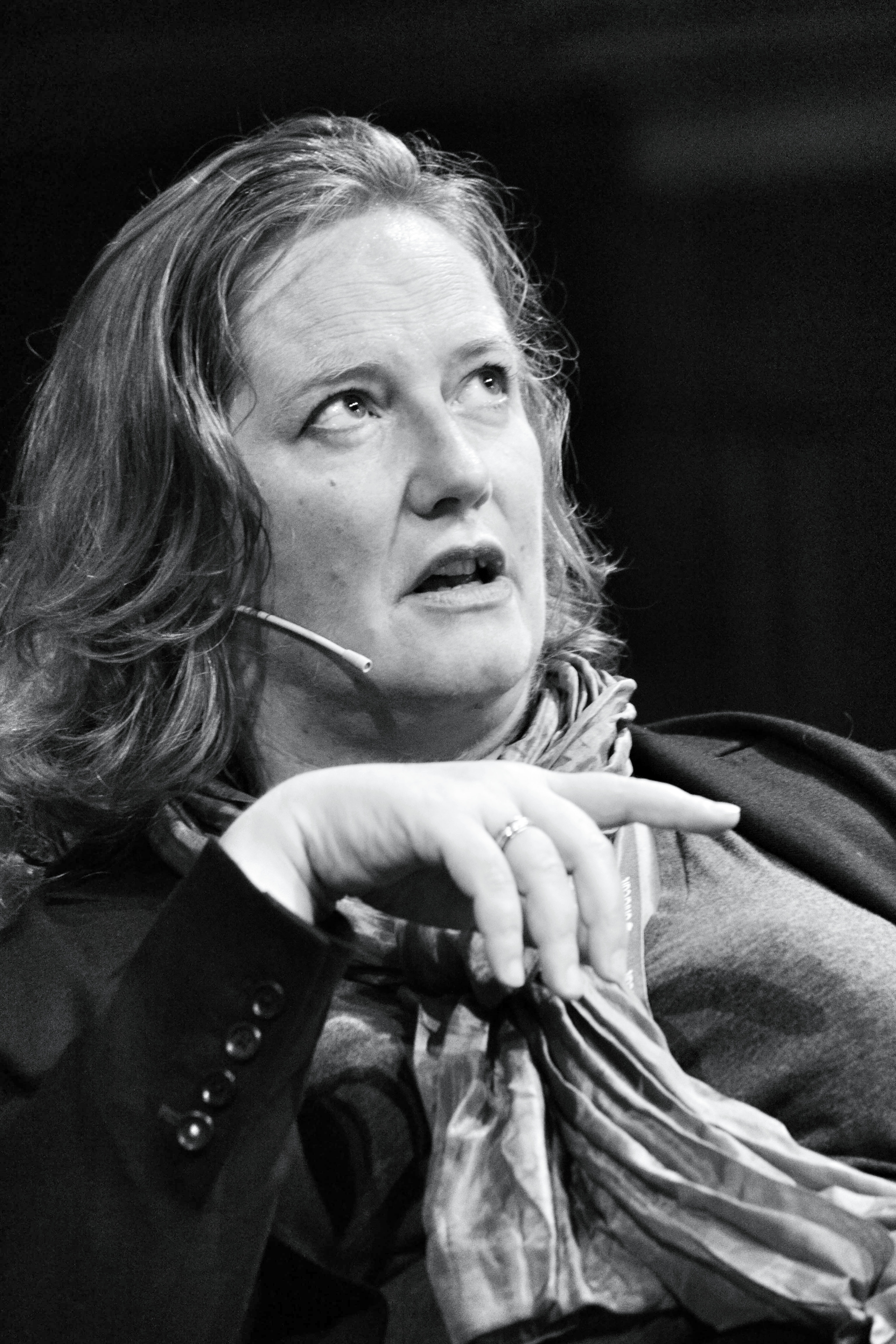
- Bell in 2013
- Born: Emily Jane Bell; 14 November 1965 (age 60); King's Lynn, Norfolk, England
- Occupations: Professor of Professional Practice, Columbia University Graduate School of Journalism
- Board member of: Guardian Newspapers Ltd, Scott Trust.

Emily Jane Bell (born 14 September 1965) is a British academic and journalist. She is Professor of Professional Practice at the Columbia University Graduate School of Journalism (Columbia School of Journalism) and the Director of the Tow Center for Digital Journalism, part of the CSJ, in New York City. Before taking up her academic post at the Tow Center in 2010, Bell had worked for The Guardian and Observer newspapers since 1990.

Born in King's Lynn, Norfolk, Bell read jurisprudence at Christ Church, Oxford, and graduated in 1987. She began her career on Big Farm Weekly that year, and then joined Campaign, the magazine for the advertising business, in 1988. In 1990, Bell joined The Observer as a business reporter becoming Media Business Editor in 1995, deputy business editor, and then Business Editor during 1998. In June 2000, Bell became executive editor of the Media Guardian website, and editor-in-chief of Guardian Unlimited in February 2001.

In September 2006, Bell was appointed to the board of Guardian Newspapers Ltd and assumed the role of director of digital content for Guardian News and Media. Bell became a non-executive director of the Scott Trust, which owns the Guardian Media Group, in January 2013.

Bell is an editor of Journalism After Snowden: The Future of the Free Press in the Surveillance State, published by Columbia University Press in March, 2017. She is also one of the 25 members of the Information and Democracy Commission launched by Reporters Without Borders.
