= Kent County Daily Times =

- Type: Daily newspaper
- Format: Broadsheet
- Owner: RISN Operations Inc.
- Publisher: Jody Boucher
- Editor: Seth Bromley
- Founded: 1892
- Headquarters: 1353 Main Street, West Warwick, Rhode Island 02893 United States
- Circulation: 3,390 Daily (as of 2006)
- Website: ricentral.com, www.kentcountytimes.com

The Kent County Daily Times is a three-day (Tuesday, Thursday, Saturday) morning daily newspaper based in West Warwick, Rhode Island, United States, covering central and western Kent County, Rhode Island. It is owned by RISN Operations Inc.

Towns in the Daily Times' coverage area include Coventry, East Greenwich, West Greenwich and West Warwick, all suburbs or rural towns southwest of Providence, Rhode Island.

== History ==
The Kent County paper was founded in 1892 as the Pawtuxet Valley Daily Times. The paper made its debut on July 20 of that year under the direction of Frank Harvey Campbell. Irving Pearce Hudson, a prominent Rhode Island Republican, and his business partner, Charles Burlingham, bought the paper in July 1907. Hudson died on February 24, 1949, at which time his widow, Thirza, took over as president and had her four daughters — Dorothy I. Havens, Lucy M.H. Potter, Marion T. Goddard, and Thirza H. Chettle — as her board of directors. Upon her death on July 18, 1961, Thirza left her estate, including the Daily Times, in equal shares to her daughters, who then elected Dorothy Havens president. The paper was sold to PVT Corporation, headed by Theodore Holmberg, on April 30, 1975. The paper became known by its current name in the 1980s. In 1999, it was acquired by Journal Register Company.

In May 2006, the Warwick Daily Times was launched following the closure of the Providence Journal news bureau in Warwick. The Daily Times newspapers added 15 new staff members to accommodate the expansion. In February 2007, a new company, RISN, formed to purchase Journal Register's Rhode Island properties, including the Daily Times newspapers. Shortly after the sale, the newspaper decreased its staff and was reduced to two eight-page sections. By July 26, 2007, the last edition of the Warwick Daily Times was published.

== Sisters and competitors ==
In its coverage area, Kent County Daily Times competes with the state's largest daily, the Providence Journal, as well as several weeklies.

RISN (which stands for Rhode Island Suburban Newspapers) also owns two other daily newspapers in Rhode Island, The Call of Woonsocket and The Times of Pawtucket, as well as several weekly newspapers. All of these properties were sold for $8.3 million to RISN in early 2007 by Journal Register Company.
