= The Westerly Sun =

Daily newspaper in Westerly, Rhode Island, US

- The Westerly Sun Logo
- Type: Daily newspaper
- Format: Broadsheet
- Owner: Sun Publishing Company
- Founder: George H. Utter
- Publisher: Jody Boucher
- Managing editor: Corey Fyke
- Founded: 1893; 132 years ago
- Language: English
- Headquarters: 100 Main Street Westerly, Rhode Island 02891
- City: Westerly
- Country: United States
- ISSN: 1065-1209
- OCLC number: 11912123
- Website: thewesterlysun.com

The Westerly Sun is a seven-day daily newspaper published in Westerly, Rhode Island, United States, covering portions of Washington County, Rhode Island, and New London County, Connecticut. The Sun is issued mornings 7 days a week. Until 1995, it published its Sunday edition in the afternoon, and was the only such paper to do so at that time. Because of this unique publishing arrangement, it was the first newspaper that reported on the Pearl Harbor attack.

The Sun is the flagship publication of Sun Publishing Company, which also prints several free weekly newspapers in the area. Sun Publishing is itself a subsidiary of Southern RI Newspapers of Wakefield, RI.

Towns covered by The Sun include Charlestown, Hopkinton, Richmond, South Kingstown and Westerly, Rhode Island; and Groton, North Stonington and Stonington, Connecticut.

== Prices ==
The Westerly Sun prices are: $1.50 daily, $3.00 Thursday and $3.00 Sunday "Weekend Edition".
