= East Greenwich Pendulum =

- Type: Weekly newspaper
- Owner: RISN Operations
- Founded: 1854
- Headquarters: East Greenwich, Rhode Island
- Circulation: 3,500
- Website: www.ricentral.com/east_greenwich_pendulum/

The East Greenwich Pendulum, formerly known as the Rhode Island Pendulum, is a publication of Rhode Island Suburban Newspapers. It is published every Thursday and serves East Greenwich and sections of Warwick with a circulation of about 3,500.

== History ==
The Rhode Island Pendulum began when William N. Sherman bought the Kent County Atlas paper and plant from John B. Lincoln, who had just recently moved his paper from Phenix to East Greenwich. The first issue was published on June 24, 1854 under the name The Weekly Pendulum due to its unique schedule: it would be published in East Greenwich one week and Wickford the next.

In 1877, Sherman sold the Pendulum to Daniel C. Kenyon. Kenyon remained owner until his death ten years later, at which point the paper was auctioned off for the price of $325 to Josiah B. Bowditch, editor of the Providence Telegram.

In the words of the paper itself, the Pendulum "has seen a long procession of colorful editors and publishers." This includes Oliver Still, who was elected to the Rhode Island State Constabulary in 1888 to enforce new prohibition laws only a year before he purchased the Rhode Island Pendulum. He used his editorship to publish pieces on prohibition, promoting the belief that "the Prohibition party was ordained by God," unlike the Democratic and Republican parties which only served the "whisky fiend". The printing plant that housed the Pendulum burned down while under Still's ownership in 1890 but he continued to publish until 1892.

Successors Will Burnside and H. V. Baldwin formed the Wilma Publishing Company in 1897, and when Baldwin left the company William B. Streeter took over as editor. Streeter sparked controversy with a strongly-worded editorial suggesting that Scalloptown, a small village on the shore of East Greenwich that housed many underprivileged people (mainly poor whites and African-Americans) should be purged. The shore was eventually demolished in 1926, "reducing it to ashes."

In 1912, Fay R. Hunt and Samuel Irwin acquired ownership of the paper with Mr. Hunt acting as editor. Joseph A. Petty leased the paper from Fay R. Hunt when he moved from Ohio to Rhode Island in 1929. The paper stayed in the Petty family until 1958 when Joseph's son, Travis Petty sold the paper to Jacob and Saralle Goodman.
