= South County Newspapers =

Independent Newspapers
- Type: Private
- Industry: Newspapers
- Founded: October 16, 1997
- Headquarters: Wakefield, Rhode Island
- Key people: Dan Kitteridge, managing editor
- Products: One weekly newspaper and magazine in Rhode Island
- Owners: RISN Operations (pending sale)
- Website: independentri.com

Independent Newspapers is an independent publisher of a weekly newspaper, The Independent, and a magazine, South County Life, in Washington County, Rhode Island.

The company was founded by veteran newspaper publisher Frederick J. Wilson III in 1997, seeking to "produce a weekly newspaper that would not be beholden to corporate interests." Wilson is no longer involved with the company, which was later sold to Edward A. Sherman Publishing Company, the publishers of The Newport Daily News. Independent Newspapers shares advertising resources with The Newport Daily News.

In 2017, Edward A. Sherman Publishing and all of its publications, including The Independent, was sold to Gatehouse Media in October 2017. In 2018, Gatehouse sold The Independent and its sister magazine South County Life to Rhode Island Suburban Newspapers.

The Independent is published on Thursdays. For several years under its Sherman and Gatehouse ownerships, its main offices were located within the Newport Daily News building in Newport, Rhode Island, and the company maintained a smaller satellite office in Wakefield, Rhode Island. Under RISN ownership, the newspaper's offices were moved permanently to Wakefield.

== Publications ==
=== Previous publications ===
==== South County Independent ====
The first of Wilson's papers, founded in 1997, the South County Independent was a New England Newspaper Association Newspaper of the Year in 2000 and 2001, and a New England Press Association general excellence winner in 2004. The South County Independent covered South Kingstown (including the villages of Kingston, Peace Dale and Wakefield), Narragansett and the University of Rhode Island.

==== North East Independent ====
Launched in 1999, the North East Independent (originally The NorthºEast Independent) took its name from its two-town coverage area, North Kingstown and East Greenwich. The newspaper won first place for general excellence from the New England Press Association in 2001 and 2005; more recently, it won "Newspaper of the Year" awards from the New England Newspaper and Press Association in 2013 and 2014, and was named a "Distinguished Newspaper" in 2015.

==== South County Living ====
The newspapers' companion magazine, South County Living, was founded in 1998.

=== Current publications ===
==== The Independent ====
In 2015, the South County Independent and North East Independent merged. The new publication, The Independent, covers the towns of South Kingstown, North Kingstown, and Narragansett; its first edition published Oct. 1, 2015. Prior to merging, the two newspapers shared a website, IndependentRI.com, which remains unchanged.

==== South County Life ====
South County Living was rebranded as South County Life magazine in 2013. The free magazine is published seven times a year and distributed throughout Southern Rhode Island (March, May, June, July, August, September and November). Its content focuses on communities in Washington County, R.I.
