= The Call (Woonsocket) =

- Type: Daily newspaper
- Format: Broadsheet
- Owner(s): Triboro Massachusetts News Media
- Publisher: Jody Boucher
- Editor: Seth Bromley
- Founded: May 31, 1892, as The Evening Call
- Headquarters: 75 Main Street, Woonsocket, Rhode Island 02895, United States
- Circulation: 5,999 Daily; 8,433 Sunday (as of 2012)
- OCLC number: 26230394
- Website: woonsocketcall.com

The Call is an American daily newspaper published seven days per week in Woonsocket, Rhode Island, covering northern Providence County, Rhode Island, and some adjacent towns in Massachusetts.

Originally an afternoon newspaper known as The Evening Call, the Woonsocket paper has published seven mornings a week since the 1990s. It was owned by RISN Operations and is currently owned by Triboro Massachusetts News Media.

In October 2023, Triboro Massachusetts News Media announced that The Call would be merging with sister paper The Times of Pawtucket to become The Blackstone Valley Call & Times, a Monday–Saturday newspaper.

== History ==
The Evening Call was founded in 1892 by Samuel E. Hudson and Andrew J. McConnell, who predicted that "the people of Woonsocket will support a paper devoted to their local and business interests," "essentially, a paper for the people."

Hudson's and McConnell's descendants—Buell W. Hudson, Charles W. Palmer, Andrew P. Palmer and Nancy E. Hudson—ran the paper for nearly 90 years before selling it to Ingersoll Publications in 1984. Ingersoll in turn was bought by Journal Register Company in 1989.

In 2007, a new company, RISN, formed to purchase Journal Register's Rhode Island properties, including The Call

== Sisters and competitors ==
In its coverage area, The Call competes with the state's largest daily, the Providence Journal. It also competes in nearby Massachusetts towns with the Worcester Telegram & Gazette and the Milford Daily News.

RISN Operations also owns two other daily newspapers in Rhode Island, The Times of Pawtucket (which shares a publisher with The Call), the Kent County Daily Times of West Warwick, as well as several weekly newspapers. All of these properties were sold for $8.3 million to RISN in early 2007 by Journal Register Company.
