= The Times (Pawtucket) =

American daily newspaper published in Pawtucket, Rhode Island

- Type: Daily newspaper
- Format: Broadsheet
- Owner(s): Triboro Massachusetts News Media
- Publisher: Jody Boucher
- Editor: Seth Bromley
- Founded: April 30, 1885
- Headquarters: 23 Exchange Street, Pawtucket, Rhode Island 02860, United States
- Circulation: 4,332 Daily; 6,315 Saturday (as of 2012)
- ISSN: 1060-2747
- Website: pawtuckettimes.com

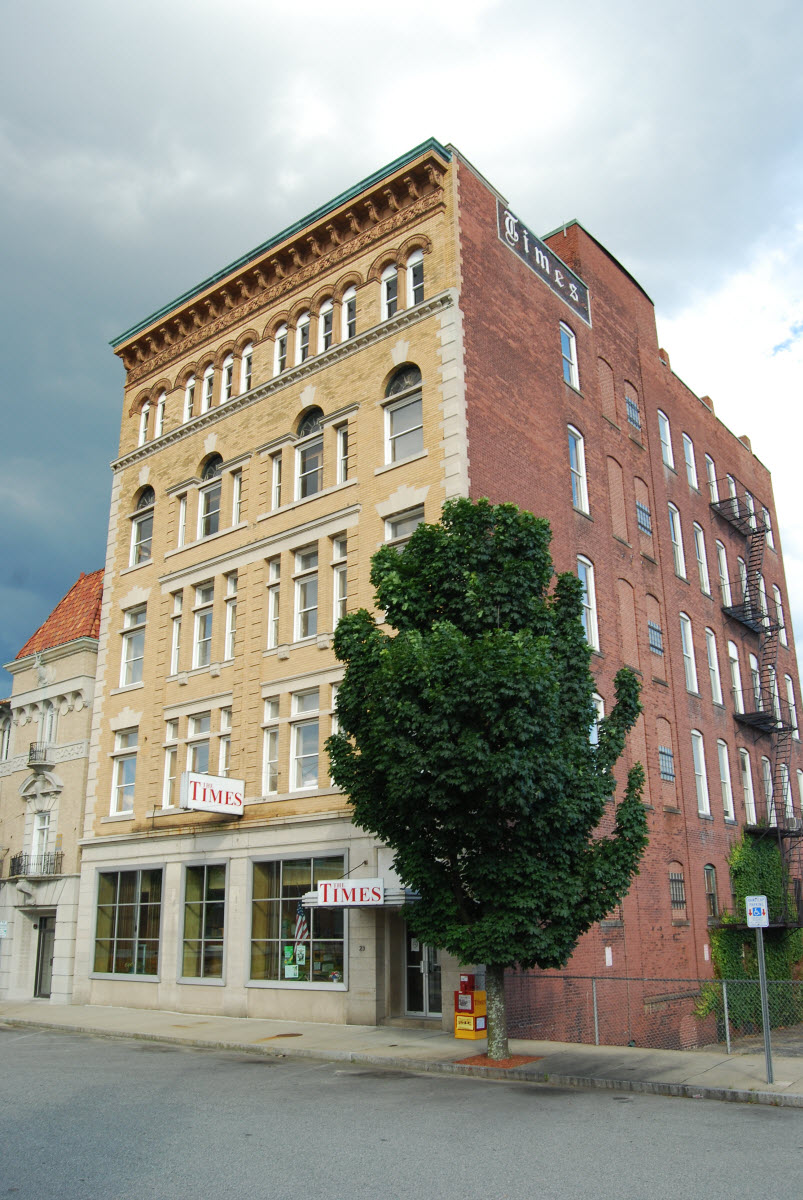
Pawtucket Times Building, 23 Exchange Street

The Times is an American daily newspaper published Mondays through Saturdays in Pawtucket, Rhode Island, covering eastern Providence County, Rhode Island, and some adjacent towns in Massachusetts. It was owned by RISN Operations and is currently owned by Triboro Massachusetts News Media.

In October 2023, Triboro Massachusetts News Media announced that The Times would be merging with sister paper The Call of Woonsocket to become The Blackstone Valley Call & Times, a Monday–Saturday newspaper.

== History ==
The Pawtucket newspaper was founded as an afternoon daily, The Evening Times, in 1885, by George O. Willard. Five years later, David O. Black bought the paper, and became the first of four generations to keep it in his family. Black commissioned a new building for the newspaper at 23 Exchange street. The Times has been published in this building since 1896.

It was sold in December 1957 to New England Newspapers Inc., a forerunner of Ingersoll Publications, which later acquired the competitor The Call of Woonsocket. Journal Register Company bought Ingersoll in 1989.

In 2007, a new company, RISN, formed to purchase Journal Register's Rhode Island properties, including The Times.

== Sisters and competitors ==
In its coverage area, The Times competes with the state's largest daily, the Providence Journal, and The Valley Breeze Pawtucket edition. It also competes in nearby Massachusetts towns with the Milford Daily News. In 2008, former Times journalist Douglas Haddon co-founded All Pawtucket, All the Time, publishing a free weekly print edition.

RISN (which stands for Rhode Island Suburban Newspapers) also owns two other daily newspapers in Rhode Island, The Call of Woonsocket (which shares a publisher with The Times) and the Kent County Daily Times of West Warwick, as well as several weekly newspapers. All of these properties were sold for $8.3 million to RISN in early 2007 by Journal Register Company.

== See also ==
- Pawtucket Times Building
