= East Bay Media Group =

American print media company, started 1837

- Company type: Private
- Industry: Newspapers
- Founded: 1837
- Headquarters: Bristol, Rhode Island; United States
- Key people: Matthew Hayes, publisher/owner Scott Pickering, general manager
- Products: Seven weeklies in Massachusetts and Rhode Island
- Website: www.eastbayri.com

East Bay Media Group (a.k.a. in 2024, and officially copyrighted until at least 2022, as East Bay Newspapers), registered as Phoenix-Times Publishing Company, is a publisher based in Bristol, Rhode Island, United States, and owner of seven weekly newspapers in eastern Rhode Island and southeastern Massachusetts.

== History ==
East Bay Media Group began with the Bristol Phoenix, founded by William H. S. Bayley in 1837. Current owner Matthew Hayes is descended from Roswell S. Bosworth Sr., who took over the paper in 1929. The company's Web presence debuted in 1998.

== Publications ==
East Bay Media Group publishes seven newspapers in Rhode Island, spanning Bristol, Newport and Providence counties, and two in Bristol County, Massachusetts. News bureaux are maintained in Rhode Island at 1 Bradford Street, Bristol, Rhode Island.

Bristol Phoenix
The company's flagship paper, the Phoenix is based in and covers Bristol, Rhode Island. It was founded in 1837 and now costs one dollar. Its circulation was 3,451 in 2022.

Barrington Times
Based in Bristol, the Times has covered Barrington, Rhode Island, since 1958. Its newsstand cost is one dollar. Its circulation was 2,629 in 2022.

East Providence Post
The Post, based in Bristol, covers East Providence, Rhode Island. It is a free newspaper. Its circulation was 7,995 in 2022.

Portsmouth Times
Based in Bristol, the Portsmouth Times covers Portsmouth. It is a free newspaper. Its circulation was 3,472 in 2022.

Sakonnet Times
Based in Tiverton, the Sakonnet Times has covered Little Compton, and Tiverton, Rhode Island, since 1967. It costs one dollar. Its circulation in 2022 was 117 copies in Portsmouth, 2,028 in Tiverton and 446 in Little Compton.

Warren Times-Gazette
Based in Bristol and covering Warren, Rhode Island, the Times-Gazette was founded in 1961 and costs one dollar. Its circulation was 1,458 in 2022.

Westport Shorelines
Westport Shorelines was founded in 1993 by Marsha England and covered both Little Compton and Westport, Massachusetts. It was sold to (then) East Bay Newspapers in 2000. It costs 75 cents. Its circulation was 1,120 in 2022.

Newport This Week
East Bay formerly published a weekly in Middletown and Newport, Rhode Island, called Newport This Week. The paper, founded in 1972, was sold to former employee Tom Shevlin in 2011 after he had left to start a news website, Newport Now, in 2009. Its circulation was 13,866 in 2022.
