= 21st Century Media =

American media company

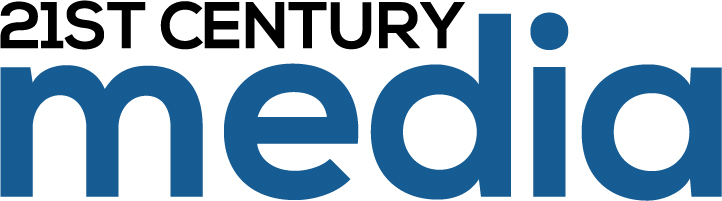
- Type: Subsidiary of Digital First Media
- Industry: Media
- Founded: 1959
- Founder: Ralph Ingersoll and Mark Goodson
- Successor: Digital First Media
- Headquarters: Yardley, Pennsylvania, U.S.
- Website: www.21stcenturynewspapers.com

21st Century Media was an American media company. It was the successor of Ingersoll Publications and Journal Register Company, and it was succeeded by Digital First Media.

The company operated more than 350 multi-platform products in 992 communities. On April 5, 2013, the assets of Journal Register Company and its affiliates were sold to 21st CMH Acquisition Co. The Journal Register Company then became known as 21st Century Media.

The company was led by CEO John Paton. He argued that the Journal Register needed to transform from a newspaper company to a "digital first, print last" company. Paton, formerly CEO of ImpreMedia, initiated this change on February 1, 2010, by announcing he would provide all reporters with Flip video cameras as a sign of his commitment to the company's digital transformation.

In 2013, MediaNews Group and 21st Century Media merged into Digital First Media. Digital First Media is owned by Alden Global Capital.

== Properties ==
The company owned daily and weekly newspapers, other print media properties and newspaper-affiliated local Web sites in the U.S. states of Connecticut, Michigan, New York, Ohio, Pennsylvania and New Jersey. It also operated 3 commercial printing facilities.

21st Century Media's flagship daily newspaper was the New Haven Register. Its ten largest daily newspapers (approximate daily circulation over 20,000) were:

- New Haven Register of New Haven, Connecticut (76,664)
- The Oakland Press of Pontiac, Michigan (63,174)
- Delaware County Daily and Sunday Times of Upper Darby Township, Pennsylvania (43,520)
- The Macomb Daily of Mount Clemens, Michigan (42,045)
- The Trentonian of Trenton, New Jersey (Sunday: 26,500)
- The News-Herald (Ohio) of Willoughby, Ohio (39,453)
- The Daily Local News of West Chester, Pennsylvania (27,087)
- The Morning Journal of Lorain, Ohio (26,777)
- The Mercury (Pennsylvania) of Pottstown, Pennsylvania (21,080)
- Daily Freeman of Kingston, New York (18,492)

== History ==
In 2004, JRC bought 21st Century Newspapers, gaining ownership of several daily newspapers in Greater Detroit.

In 2006, JRC bought the Web site JobsInTheUS.com. It is also a major shareholder in consulting company PowerOne Media. That same year, the company moved its headquarters to Yardley, Pennsylvania from Trenton, New Jersey.

In early 2007, JRC completed the sales of its former Massachusetts and Rhode Island newspapers to GateHouse Media and RISN Operations, respectively.

In early 2008, the New York Stock Exchange announced it was planning to suspend trading of JRC's common stock. The stock had been below $1.05 for 30 consecutive days, at one point falling to 16 cents, which was the all-time low at that time. The stock was delisted as of April 16.

On February 21, 2009, the company filed for Chapter 11 bankruptcy in the US Bankruptcy Court, located in Manhattan, New York, NY.

On August 12, 2009, JRC emerged from bankruptcy as a private company.

On March 17, 2010, the company named an advisory board composed of Jeff Jarvis (author of "What Would Google Do" and BuzzMachine); Jay Rosen of New York University, and Emily Bell, the director of the Tow Center for Digital Journalism at Columbia University.

On March 11, 2010, the company named Bill Higginson, Journal Register's former Senior Vice President, Production, as the company's president and COO. On March 4, 2010, the company named Jeff Bairstow as chief financial officer. Bairstow joined Journal Register after working for Synarc Inc., a leading provider of medical imaging analysis, subject-recruitment and biochemical-marker services.

On September 5, 2012, Digital First Media, parent company of JRC, confirmed the group had again filed for bankruptcy protection.

On April 5, 2013, the assets of Journal Register Company and its affiliates were sold to 21st CMH Acquisition Co., an affiliate of funds managed by Alden Global Capital. The Journal Register Company then became known as 21st Century Media and continued to be managed by Digital First Media.
