= RISN Operations =

Publisher of daily and weekly newspapers in Rhode Island

RISN Operations Inc.
- Company type: Private
- Industry: Newspapers
- Founded: January 22, 2007
- Headquarters: 222 Jefferson Blvd, Warwick, Rhode Island
- Key people: Melanie Radler, president Roland McBride, vice president
- Products: The Call and seven other newspapers in Rhode Island
- Parent: Glacier Media (50% owner)

RISN Operations Inc., also called Rhode Island Suburban Newspapers, is a privately owned publisher of three daily newspapers and several weekly newspapers in the U.S. state of Rhode Island. The company was founded by Illinois-based newspaper executives in early 2007 to purchase the Rhode Island holdings of Journal Register Company, which it did for $8.3 million.

In 2013, RISN acquired the Yuma Sun and the Porterville Recorder from Freedom Communications.

In 2018, RISN acquired its former competitors South County Newspapers and its publications The Independent and South County Life from GateHouse Media, who had bought the papers from Edward A. Sherman Publishing in 2017.

In 2019, RISN acquired The Westerly Sun and Sun Publishing Company from the Record-Journal Publishing Company of Meriden, Connecticut. Also in 2019, RISN acquired The Union Democrat in California.

In 2022, RISN acquired The Chronicle of Willimantic, Connecticut, from Central Connecticut Communications.

== Officers ==
The corporation's first two named officers, Melanie Radler (president) and Roland McBride (vice president and treasurer), were both Illinois residents connected with Conrad Black's former Hollinger International newspaper chain. Radler is the daughter of F. David Radler, a former Hollinger boss; McBride is chief financial officer of Horizon Publications Inc., the company Radler founded after he left Hollinger.

McBride also served as CFO of American Publishing Co., a former Hollinger subsidiary, and was said in an indictment to have aided Black's and the elder Radler's misappropriation of $5.5 million in connection with the sale of some newspaper properties from Hollinger to Horizon.

The company is based in Warwick, Rhode Island. Its incorporation papers list a Delaware address.

RISN shares owners with Horizon Publications.

== Dailies ==
RISN operates seven daily newspapers:

- The Call of Woonsocket, Rhode Island
- Kent County Daily Times of West Warwick, Rhode Island
- Porterville Recorder of Porterville, California
- The Times of Pawtucket, Rhode Island
- The Union Democrat of Sonora, California
- The Westerly Sun of Westerly, Rhode Island
- Yuma Sun of Yuma, Arizona
- The Chronicle of Willimantic, Connecticut

The company also briefly published the Warwick Daily Times, based in the West Warwick newsroom. The Warwick paper had been founded by JRC in 2006 but was folded by RISN in 2007.

== Weeklies ==
RISN's weekly newspapers, known collectively as Southern Rhode Island Newspapers, are based in the village of Wakefield, part of South Kingstown, Rhode Island. A Providence Journal report said the group's combined weekly circulation of around 13,000 in 2007 was down from 16,140 in 2001.

Southern Rhode Island Newspapers' offices are at 187 Main Street, Wakefield, Rhode Island 02879.

The East Greenwich Pendulum
The East Greenwich Pendulum has covered East Greenwich in Kent County since 1854. Its Thursday circulation in 2006 averaged 2,040.

The Narragansett Times
With the largest and most frequent circulation of the Wakefield-based papers—5,006 in 2006, delivered twice weekly, on Wednesday and Friday -- The Narragansett Times is the second oldest, having covered Narragansett and South Kingstown, in southeastern Washington County, since 1855.

The Standard-Times
The Standard-Times is the only of RISN's newspapers to cover a community off the mainland. In addition to Exeter and North Kingstown, it covers Jamestown in Newport County. Founded in 1888, its Thursday circulation was 3,854 in 2006.

The Independent
The Independent covers South Kingstown (including the villages of Kingston, Wakefield and Peace Dale and the University of Rhode Island), Narragansett and North Kingstown. Founded in 1997 and originally operated by South County Newspapers as two papers, the South County Independent and North East Independent, which were both competitors to several Southern Rhode Island Newspapers publications. The two papers were eventually bought by Edward A. Sherman Publishing, the owners of The Newport Daily News, and in 2015 were merged into the single Independent newspaper. In 2017, Sherman Publishing was purchased by Gatehouse Media. RISN acquired The Independent and its sister magazine South County Life from Gatehouse in June 2018.

Sun Publishing Company also publishes weekly newspapers.

Closure of The Chariho Times and The Coventry Courier

In August 2023, The Chariho Times and The Coventry Courier, two of RISN's weekly Southern Rhode Island Newspapers, announced on that they were "ceasing publication...[due to] rising costs, fewer resources and decreased local advertising revenue". The Chariho Times, founded in 1993, covered Charlestown, Hopkinton and Richmond, three rural towns in western Washington County that form the Chariho Regional School District. The Coventry Courier covered Coventry and West Greenwich, the two westernmost towns of Kent County, also covered by the Kent County Daily Times. It was founded in 1996.

== Plagiarism controversies ==
In April 2013, an assistant editor at The Narragansett Times plagiarized the lede (the first paragraph of a news story) from an article in a competitor newspaper, the South County Independent. The South County Independent asked for a front-page apology, and The Narragansett Times subsequently printed a clarification stating the words were "inadvertently transcribed" and "apologize[d] for any confusion this may have caused our readers."
