= List of newspapers in Connecticut =

This is a list of newspapers in Connecticut.

== Daily newspapers (currently published) ==
- The Advocate – Stamford
- The Bristol Press – Bristol
- The Bulletin – Norwich
- The Chronicle – Willimantic
- Connecticut Post – Bridgeport
- The Day – New London
- Greenwich Time – Greenwich
- Hartford Courant – Hartford
- New Britain Herald – New Britain
- The Hour – Norwalk
- Journal Inquirer – Manchester
- The Middletown Press – Middletown
- New Haven Register – New Haven
- The News-Times – Danbury
- Record-Journal – Meriden
- The Register Citizen – Torrington
- Republican-American – Waterbury
- Town Times – Watertown

== Weekly newspapers (currently published) ==
- The Bethel Community Gazette – Bethel
- The Bloomfield Messenger – Bloomfield
- The Brookfield Community Gazette – Brookfield
- The Cheshire Herald – Cheshire
- The Chronicle Weekly – Willimantic
- The Commercial Record – South Windsor
- The Connecticut Mirror – Hartford
- The Darien Times – Darien
- East Haddam News – East Haddam
- East Hartford Gazette – East Hartford
- The Easton Community Gazette – Easton
- Fairfield Citizen-News – Fairfield
- Glastonbury Citizen – Glastonbury
- Haddam-Killingworth News – Haddam, Killingworth
- Herald Press, 1996 – present
- Huntington Herald – Shelton
- The Inner City News – New Haven
- Inquirer Group – Hartford
- Jewish Ledger – West Hartford
- The Kent Dispatch – Kent (formerly The Kent Good Times Dispatch)
- Killingly Villager – Killingly
- The Lakeville Journal – Lakeville
- The Monroe Community Gazette – Monroe
- Mystic River Press – Mystic
- The New Canaan Advertiser – New Canaan
- The New Canaan Sentinel – New Canaan
- New Haven Independent – New Haven
- The Newtown Bee – Newtown
- The Newtown Community Gazette – Newtown
- Northend Agents – Hartford
- Polonia News – Oxford (biweekly)
- Polski Express – New Britain
- Przegląd Polonijny z Connecticut – New Britain
- Putnam Villager – Putnam
- The Redding Community Gazette – Redding
- Redding Sentinel - Redding
- The Ridgefield Community Gazette – Ridgefield
- The Ridgefield Press – Ridgefield
- Sol, El – Stamford
- The Sound – Madison
- Stratford Crier – Stratford
- Thompson Villager – Thompson, Connecticut
- Town Times – Durham and Middlefield
- Town Tribune – New Fairfield
- Tribuna (a.k.a. La Tribuna, 'The Tribune') – Danbury
- Trumbull Times – Shelton
- Voices and Voices Weekender – Southbury
- West Hartford News – Bristol
- Westport News – Westport
- The Wilton Bulletin – Wilton
- Windsor Journal – Bristol
- Windsor Locks Journal – Bristol
- Woodstock Villager – Woodstock, Connecticut

== University newspapers ==
- The Campus Lantern – Eastern Connecticut State University (Willimantic)
- Charger Bulletin – University of New Haven (West Haven)
- The Daily Campus – UConn (Storrs)
- The Echo – Western Connecticut State University (Danbury)
- Fairfield Mirror – Fairfield University (Fairfield)
- The Hartford Informer – University of Hartford (West Hartford)
- The Wesleyan Argus – Wesleyan University (Middletown)
- The Trinity Tripod – Trinity College (Connecticut) (Hartford)
- Yale Daily News – Yale (New Haven)
- The Southern News – Southern Connecticut State University (New Haven)
- The Spectrum – Sacred Heart University (Fairfield)
- The Recorder – Central Connecticut State University (New Britain)

== Defunct ==
=== Fairfield County ===
==== Bridgeport ====
Newspapers published in Bridgeport, Connecticut:

- AfroVoice Review, a.k.a. Afri-Voice Review (1988– uncertain, 1990s)
- American Telegraphe (1795–1804)
  - also published as, American Telegraphe, & Fairfield County Gazette
- Amerikai Magyarság a.k.a. A Mi Lapunk (1942– ceased 20th century [unknown year])
- L'Amico del popolo (unknown dates; ceased before 1910)
- Anzeiger (1887– ?)
- Aurora (1916–1935)
- The Beacon (1931–1942)
- Black Rock Beacon (unknown [20th century] –1931)
- Black Rock Journal (1980– unknown [20th century])
- Black Rock News (1978– uncertain, 1980s)
- Black Rock News (1988–1989)
- Black Rock Star, aka Park City Star (1947– before 1950)
- Boneville Trumpet (uncertain, 1860s – 1870s)
- Bridgeport (uncertain dates: began 1910s, ceased 20th century)
- Bridgeport Advertiser (1806– c. 1810s)
- Bridgeport Advocate (1896– unknown, 20th century)
- Bridgeport Chronicle (1848– unknown 19th century)
- Bridgeport Courier (1815–1821)
- Bridgeport Daily Standard (uncertain dates: from 1830s –1919)
  - a.k.a. The Tri-Weekly Standard; The Daily Standard; Bridgeport Evening Standard; The Bridgeport Standard; The Bridgeport Standard-American; Standard American; Bridgeport Republican; Republican Standard
- Bridgeport Eagle (1990– ?)
- Bridgeport Egyetertes (1914–1942)
- Bridgeport Evening Farmer (1866–1917)
- Bridgeport Examiner (1913– uncertain, 20th century)
- Bridgeport Gazette (1810– unknown, 19th century)
- Bridgeport Herald (1805– unknown, 19th century)
- Bridgeport Independent, aka Independent Democrat (1878– uncertain year, 19th century)
- Bridgeport Jewish Ledger (1977–1996)
- Bridgeport Journal (1891– uncertain year, 1890s)
- Bridgeport Leader (1854– ?)
- Bridgeport Life (1915– uncertain year, 1950s)
- The Bridgeport Light (1988–1990)
- Bridgeport Local (1867– before 1900)
- Bridgeport Messenger (1831–1832)
- Bridgeport Morning News (1879– uncertain year, 1890s)
  - a.k.a. The Morning News; Bridgeport Evening News; The Evening News
- Bridgeport News (1989–2009)
- The Bridgeport News weekly, closed 2018
- The Bridgeport Star (1876– uncertain, 19th century)
- Bridgeport Star (1919–1926)
  - aka The Bridgeport Evening Star and Evening Herald; The Evening Star and Evening Herald; Bridgeport Star-Herald Evening Herald
- Bridgeport Sun (1878–1882)
- Bridgeport Sunday Item (1889– uncertain year, 19th c.)
- Bridgeport Times (1983– uncertain year, 1980s)
- Bridgeport Union (1891– uncertain, 1890s)
- Bridgeporter Zeitung (1873– uncertain year, 1880s)
- Bridgeporti Ujság ('Bridgeport News', 1906– unknown year, 1910s)
- Broun's Nutmeg (1939)
- Compass (1975– ?)
- The Connecticut American (1935–1936)
- Connecticut Courier (1814–1826)
- Connecticut Waisenfreund (1897–1899)
- Connecticut Workman (1901– before 1910)
- The Crusader (1885– unknown)
- Daily Advertiser (1880s, exact years unknown)
- The Daily News (1876– unknown year, 19th century)
- Eagle, aka, Sunday Eagle or Weekly Eagle (1880– before 1890)
- The Eagle (1884– ?)
- Enterprise (1908–1914)
- Evening News (1895–1898)
- The Evening Star (1847–1849)
- Evening Times (1892– before 1900)
- Fairfield Advocate (1979–1981)
- Fairfield County Advocate (1981–1993)
- Fairfield County Anzeiger (1885–1896)
- Fairfield County Gazette (dates unknown)
- Fairfield County Press (1955–1959)
- The Fireside Journal (1872– uncertain, before 1900)
- Harambee; a.k.a. Harambee Union (1969–1976)
- The Jewish Argus (1935– uncertain, 1960s)
- The Journal (1875– before 1880)
- Journal (unknown dates)
- The Lance (1874– before 1880)
- Law And Order (1893– before 1900)
- The Leader (1872– uncertain year, 1910s)
  - aka The Daily Leader; The Independent; The Independent Leader
- Life (1894– ?)
- The Little Giant (1884– ?)
- The Morning Union, aka The Daily Union (1891–1901)
- May's Town Crier (1871– before 1880)
- The Morning News (1870– before 1880)
- The North End News (1932– before 1940)
- Patriot of Seventy-Six (1804– uncertain year, 19th century)
- The People's Champion (1881– before 1890)
- The Pequonnock Amateur (1884– unknown)
- The Rosedale (1880– before 1890)
- Rundschau (1892–1898)
- Scroll (1979–1982)
- La Sentinella, 'The Sentinel' (1920–1948)
- Il Sole (uncertain, 1900s – 1910s)
- Spirit Of The Times (1830– before 1840)
- The Star (c. 1872– after 1908)
  - also known as Weekly Budget; The Bridgeport Sun; The Sun; The Bridgeport Weekly Sun; Bridgeport Star; The Bridgeport Star
- Sunday Herald (1890–1973)
  - aka Bridgeport Herald; The Connecticut Sunday Herald
- The Sunday Journal (1897– before 1900)
- Sunrise (uncertain dates; began 18th century)
- The News of Bridgeport's North End & Black Rock (2009–2012)
- Times-Star, a.k.a. The Bridgeport Times, The Bridgeport Star (1926–1941)
- La Tribuna or La Tribuna del Connecticut (1906–1908)
- La Vittoria (1929– unknown, 20th century)
- Weekly Enterprise (1878– before 1880)
- The Weekly Globe (1891– before 1900)
- Wochenblatt (1890–1894)

==== Danbury ====
Newspapers published in Danbury, Connecticut:

- Bethel Eagle (1894)
- Connecticut Intelligencer (1809–1810)
- Danburian-Press (1875)
- Danbury Chronicle And Fairfield County Democrat (1836)
- Danbury Democrat (1877–1888)
- Danbury Gazette (1813–1814)
- Danbury Gazette (1833–1835)
- Danbury Globe (1872– ?)
- Danbury News (1870–1933)
- Danbury News-Times (1933–1963)
- Danbury Record (1941)
- Danbury Recorder (1826–1830)
- Danbury Republican (1879–1884)
- Danbury Times (1837–1870)
- Day (1812)
- Dispatch (1892– ?)
- Evening News (1871–1890)
- Farmers Chronicle (1793–1796)
- Farmer's Journal (1790–1793)
- Jeffersonian (1860–1866)
- New England Republican (1804-1808)
- News (1835– ?)
- People (1878)
- Republican Farmer (1803–1917)
- Sun Of Liberty (1800)
- Tribuna Connecticut (2005–2007)

==== Fairfield ====
Newspapers published in Fairfield, Connecticut:

- The Black Rock News (c. 1920s)
- Chronicle (1891– ?)
- Fairfield County Times (?-?)
- Fairfield Gazette, W., July 13, 1786 – February 1787
- Fairfield Gazette, Or The Independent Intelligencer, W., February 1787 – August 1787
- The Fairfield Review (1913– ?)
- Pequot Record (1890)
- Times (1878– ?)

==== Norwalk ====
Newspapers published in Norwalk, Connecticut:

- Chronicle And Democrat (1837)
- Citizen Leader (1880– ?)
- Connecticut Republican (1880–1889)
- Daily Norwalk Gazette And Saturdays Norwalk Record (1890)
- Democrat; Norwalk Democrat (1877– ?)
- Eagle (?-?)
- Evening Sentinel (1887–1920)
- Fairfield County Democrat (1871)
- Fairfield County Morning News (1977–1978)
- Fairfield County Republican (1828– ?)
- Home Companion (1876)
- Independent Republican (1802–1803)
- News (1894– ?)
- Norwalk Eagle (1876-1879)
- Norwalk Gazette; Norwalk Daily Gazette (1800– ?)
- Norwalk News (1989-1993)
- Norwalk News Trader (1987–1989)
- Norwalk Record (1887–1890)
- Old Well Local (?-?)
- Sentinel (1936-1946)
- South Norwalk Independent (1871-1872)
- South Norwalk Republican (1889)
- South Norwalk Sentinel (1870– ?)
- South Norwalk Shield (1878)
- Stamford times (2007–2016)
- Star (1884)

==== Stamford ====
Newspapers published in Stamford, Connecticut:

- City Post (1895– before 1900)
- The Comet (1883– before 1890)
- The Daily Republican (1899– before 1910)
- Democratic Pilot (1842– before 1850)
- The Evening Star (1915– before 1920)
- Fairfield County Business Journal (?-?)
- Fairfield County Democrat (1871– ?)
- The Free Press (1919– ?)
- Greenwich Suburbanite (1981– before 1990)
- The Home Journal (after 1869– uncertain, 19th century)
- Intercorp (unknown dates)
- The Morning News (1914– before 1920)
- The Stamford American (1906– before 1910)
- The Stamford Bulletin/Evening Bulletin (?–?)
- The Stamford Citizen (1912– before 1920)
- The Stamford Forum or The Forum (1970– before 1980)
- Stamford Herald (1875–1893)
- Stamford Jewish Ledger (1977–1996)
- Stamford Journal (1872– before 1880)
- The Stamford News (1899– ?)
- The Stamford Postal Card (1876– before 1880)
- Stamford Press (1928–1929)
- The Stamford Record or The Evening Record (1883– before 1900)
- The Stamford Register (1916– ?)
- Stamford Review (1923–1923)
- Stamford Sentinel (1923– ?)
- Stamford Shopper (? –1972)
- Stamford Telegram (1897– before 1910)
- The Stamford Tribune (1896– before 1900)
- The Stamford Daily News (1886–1888)
  - aka The Stamford News; The Stamford Weekly News; Stamford Saturday News
- Stamford Weekly Mail (? –1972)
- Stamford Weekly Mail and the Stamford Shopper (1972–1990)
  - also known as Stamford Weekly Mail; Stamford Mail; The Stamford Trader
- Standard (1895– ?)
- Town Crier (1891– before 1900)
- La Tribuna (1933– 1950s)
- La Union Hispano-Americana (1979)
- La Voz Hispano-Americana (1978)

==== Elsewhere ====
- Bethel News; Oxford County Citizen – Bethel (1895–1950)
- Bethel Statesman – Bethel (1911– before 1920)
- The Connecticut Citizen – Ridgefield (1892– ?)
- Connecticut Patriot; Saugatuck Journal – Bridgeport, Westport (1826– ?)
- The Darien News-Review, weekly, closed 2019
- The Easton Courier – Easton, weekly
- Fairfield Minuteman – Westport (1995-2017)
- Greenwich Graphic – Greenwich (1881– ?)
- The Herald of Freedom – Bethel, Norwalk (1831–1835)
- Ledger – Bethel (1874-?)
- Messenger – New Canaan (1876-?)
- The Monroe Courier – Monroe, weekly
- The Newtown Chronicle – Newtown (1880– ?)
- The New Canaan News-Review – New Canaan, weekly, closed 2019
- News – Greenwich (1888– ?)
- North End News – Trumbull (1987–1989)
- Observer – Greenwich (1877– ?)
- The Redding Pilot – Redding (1982–1996)
- Reporter – Wilton (unknown dates)
- Saugatuck Journal and Fairfield County Republican; Fairfield County Republican – Westport (unknown dates)
- Star – Redding (unknown dates)
- The Stratford News – Stratford (1928– ?)
- The Stratford Star, weekly
- The Weston Forum, weekly (1970–2018)
- Westport Minuteman – Westport (1993–2017)
- Westporter Herald; Westporter – Westport (1876–1951)

=== Hartford County ===
==== Hartford ====
Newspapers published in Hartford, Connecticut:

- Advertiser (?-?)
- American Mercury, W., July 12, 1784-June 25, 1833
- American Poultry Yard (1878-?)
- The American Standard (?-?)
- The Bridgeport Inquirer (?-2006)
- La Capitale Tribuna di Hartford (1934)
- The Catholic Transcript (1925-1978)
- The Charter Oak/Christian Freeman (1838-1849)
- Christian Secretary (1822– ?)
- Clarion (unknown dates)
- The Clarksonian (1843–1844)
- Connecticut Catholic (1876-?)
- Connecticut Chronicle/Hartford Chronicle/Hartford-Springfield Chronicle (1915-1949)
- The Connecticut Craftsman (?-?)
- Connecticut Farmer (1879-?)
- The Connecticut Hebrew Record (1923)
- Connecticut Post/Evening Post/Post (1856-?)
- Connecticuter Zeitung – Boston, Hartford (closed 1863)
- The CT Italian Bulletin (1974-ca. 1980)
- The CT Italian Bulletin and Review (1950-1974)
- El Extra News/El Xtra News (1991-1996)
- The Examiner (1881-?)
- The Freeman's Chronicle, Or The American Advertiser, W., Sept. 1, 1783-July 8, 1784
- Globe/Sunday Globe (1876-?)
- Hartford Bulletin (1950-1956)
- Hartford Catholic Press (1829-1831)
- Hartford Connecticut Mirror (1809-1831)
- Hartford Gazette, S.W., W., Jan. 13, 1794-Mar. 19, 1795
- Hartford Herald (?-?)
- The Hartford Inquirer (1975-2006)
- Hartford Labor (1894-?)
- The Hartford Star (1969–1974)
- The Hartford Times (1817–1976)
- The Hartford Voice (1974–1975)
- Hartforder Anzeiger (1877–1878)
- Der Hartforder Herold (1907)
- Der Hartforder Stadt-Bote (1881– ?)
- Hartforder Zeitung (1858– ?)
- Herold (1883– ?)
- Hispano (1975– ?)
- Imparcial (1989)
- The Indian Bulletin (1888–1901)
- The Informer (1977–1978)
- Journal (1867– ?)
- The Labor Standard (1908– c. 1920s)
- New England Bulletin (1949– ?)
- New Haven Inquirer (1976–2006)
- North Hartford Truth (1971–1974)
- Observador (1977– c. 1981)
- El Periodico (1983–1985)
- La Prensa Grafica (1974–1975)
- Le Programme (1929)
- Que Pasa (1977– c. 1992)
- The Religious Herald (1843– ?)
- Saturday Night (unknown dates)
- The Sunbeam (1841– ?)
- Sunday Argus (1879– ?)
- Sunday Journal (1867– ?)
- Telegram (1884– ?)
- The Temperance Journal (1872-1875)
- El Transcrito Catolico (c. 1990–1997)
- La Vanguardia (1989– c. 1991)
- The Weekly Examiner (uncertain dates: 1880s – 1900s )

==== New Britain ====
Newspapers published in New Britain, Connecticut:

- Bee (1886– ?)
- The Catholic Leader Polish: Przewodnik Katolocki (1907–1964)
- Daily News (uncertain dates: 1890s – 1900s)
- The Eastern Herald or Osterns Harold (1907)
- Herald (1880– ?)
- Independent (1886– ?)
- Mala Polska (unknown)
- Il Messaggero di New England or The New England Messenger (1931)
- Morning Dispatch (1894– ?)
- Observer (1876– ?)
- The Power Press (c. 1970s – before 2000)
- Przewodnik Katolicki (1907–1966)
- Record (1865– ?)
- Times (1880– ?)

==== Elsewhere ====
- American Enterprise – East Hartford (1888– ?)
- The Berlin News – Berlin (1892–1907)
- Berlin Record – Berlin (1909– ?)
- Bristol Herald – Bristol (1888–1901)
- Bulletin – Glastonbury (1893– ?)
- Elf Leaf – East Hartford (unknown dates)
- Farmington Valley Herald – Bristol, Southington, Simsbury (? –1996)
- Gazette – Enfield (1892– ?)
- Manchester Herald; Manchester Evening Herald; Saturday Herald – Manchester (1881–1991)
- Mechanics Journal – Canton (1888– ?)
- Newington Town Crier – Bristol
- News – Manchester (1893– ?)
- News – Plainville (1871– ?)
- Pequabuck Valley Gazette – Bristol (unknown dates)
- Phœnix/Weekly Phœnix – Southington (1873– ?)
- Reporter – Southington (unknown dates)
- Thompsonville Press – Enfield (1880–1969)
- Times – Bristol (1881– ?)
- Times – Manchester (unknown dates)
- Valley News – Bristol
- La Voce – Newington (1973– c. 1974)
- Weekly Press – Bristol (1871– ?)

=== Litchfield County ===
==== Litchfield ====
Newspapers published in Litchfield, Connecticut:

- Collier's Litchfield Weekly Monitor, W., Jan. 7-June 16, 1788
- The Farmer's Monitor, W., Mar. 5-Dec. 31, 1800+
- The Litchfield County Post (1826-1829)
- Litchfield-County Monitor, W., Dec. 11, 1790-Jan. 3, 1791
- Litchfield Enquirer – Litchfield (1826-2009)
- Litchfield Monitor, W., Jan. 10, 1791-Jan. 4, 1792; Aug. 27, 1794-June 3, 1795
- Litchfield Monitor And Agricultural Register, W., June 10, 1795 – May 11, 1796
- The Litchfield Weekly Monitor, June 23, 1788
- The Monitor, W., Jan. 11, 1792-Aug. 20, 1794; Feb. 28, 1798-Feb. 26, 1800+
- Weekly Monitor, W., Mar. Or April 1785-Nov. 28, 1786; June 11-Dec. 31, 1787; June 30, 1788-May 11, 1789; Nov. 17, 1789-Dec. 4, 1790; May 18, 1796-Feb. 21, 1798
- Weekly Monitor And American Advertiser, W., Dec. 21, 1784-Mar. 1785
- Weekly Monitor And Litchfield Town And County Recorder, W., Dec. 5, 1786-June 4, 1787
- Weekly Monitor And The Litchfield Advertiser, W., May 18 - June 8, 1789
- Witness – Litchfield (1806-1807)

==== Watertown ====
- Lietuviu kelias (1950)
- Post (1881)
- Post Boy (1887)
- Sunday Republican (1918)
- Watertown Argus (1937)
- Watertown Journal (1888-1891)
- Watertown News (1913-1929)

==== Winsted ====
- Argus (1875– ?)
- News (unknown dates)
- Sun (1880– ?)
- Times and News (1875-?)
- Winsted Citizen (1982–1983)
- Winsted Citizen (2023)
- Winsted Evening Citizen; Litchfield County Leader (1873–1982)
- Winsted Herald (1853?)
- Winsted Press (1873– ?)

==== Elsewhere ====
- Advertiser – Thomaston (1878-?)
- The Brookfield Journal – New Milford (1957-2009)
- Connecticut Western News; Connecticut Western; Connecticut Western Star; The Western – North Canaan, Salisbury (1871–1979)
- Evening Item – Torrington (1896– ?)
- Gazette – New Milford (1872– ?)
- Housatonic Ray – New Milford (1872– ?)
- The Morris Herald – Morris (1898– ?)
- The New Milford Times – New Milford (1914–2009)
- News – Thomaston (1881– ?)
- Recorder – Woodbury (?-?)
- Reporter – Woodbury (1877– ?)
- Republican – Woodbury (1881– ?)
- Rural Gazette, W. – Sharon (March 31, 1800)
- Thomaston Express – Thomaston (1880–2000)
- Tribune – New Hartford (1880– ?)

=== Middlesex County ===
==== Middletown ====
Newspapers published in Middletown, Connecticut:

- American Sentinel/Sentinel and Witness, weekly (1823–1826)
- Citizen (1894-?)
- Connecticut Spectator, including May 1814 – December 1814, weekly
- The Constitution, former weekly newspaper, (1837– ?)
- The Daily Herald, former daily newspaper
- Evening Press, including 1918–1919, daily, excluding Sundays.
- Middlesex Gazette or The Middlesex Gazette, Or Federal Adviser, including 1785–1834 (with gaps), weekly
- The Middletown Bulletin (1949-1967, 1968-?)
- Middletown Daily Constitution, including 1872–1876, daily, excluding Sundays.
- Middletown Daily Sentinel, including January 1876 – June 1876, daily, excluding Sundays.
- Middletown Sun, including 1908–1914, daily, excluding Sundays.
- The Middletown Times, daily newspaper in Middletown during 1913–1914 or during 1914 to January 1915
- The Middletown Tribune, Republican newspaper in Middletown including 1893–1906, daily, excluding Sundays.
- News and Advertiser, including 1851–1854, weekly
- Penny Press, including 1884–1939, daily, excluding Sundays.
- The Sentinel and Witness, former weekly newspaper (1823– ?)
- State Temperance Journal (?-?)

==== Elsewhere ====
- Advertiser/Connecticut Valley Advertiser – East Haddam (1869– ?)
- Clinton Enquirer – Clinton (1970– ?)
- Gazette - Essex (1879– ?)
- Middlesex Republican– Essex (1880– ?)
- New Era – Deep River, Chester (1874– ?)
- Shore Recorder – Clinton (1895– ?)

=== New Haven County ===
==== Guilford ====
- The Branford Review (1928–2008)
- Echo (1891-?)
- Item (1879-?)
- Pictorial-Gazette
- Regional Standard

==== Meriden ====
- Eagle Wing Press (c. 1981–1987)
- Evening Press (1881– ?)
- The Meriden Daily Journal (1887-1953)
- Meriden Citizen
- The Meriden Daily Republican, or Daily Republican (1868–1898)
- Meriden Recorder a.k.a. Rigg's Literary Recorder or Call, (1862– ?)
- Meriden Republican (1860– ?)
- Morning Record (1892– ?)
- Newsboy (1862– ?)
- Sunday News (1881– ?)
- El Tiempo (1992–1997)

==== New Haven ====
Newspapers published in New Haven, Connecticut:

- Amity Observer (1998–2011)
- Amity Star (1950–1953)
- Los Andes (c. 1989–1994?)
- Black Coalition Weekly (1972)
- Black Panther Party—New Haven (unknown dates)
- Catholic Standard (1889– ?)
- Commercial Record (1882– ?)
- Commonwealth (unknown dates)
- Connecticut Beobachter (ca. 1865-1871?)
- Connecticut Botschafter (1876-?)
- Connecticut Freie-Press (ca. 1875-1907)
- The Connecticut Gazette, W., July 5, 1765-Feb. 19, 1768
- Connecticut Gazette, With The Freshest Advices Foreign And Domestick, W., Apr. 12, 1755-Apr. 14, 1764
- The Connecticut Journal (1767–1987)
  - a.k.a. Connecticut Herald & Journal, The Connecticut Journal, and New-Haven Post-Boy, The Connecticut Journal, Connecticut Journal and Weekly Advertiser, Connecticut Journal and Advertiser, Connecticut Journal and Weekly Adveriser, Journal-Courier, Morning Journal and Courier, Connecticut Herald and Journal
- The Connecticut Labor News (1921-1925)
- The Connecticut Labor Press (? –1921)
- Connecticut Republikaner (1867-1901)
- Connecticut Volksblatt (1885-?)
- Corporal Fracassa (1895-?)
- Il Corriere del Connecticut (ca. 1896-1955?)
- Counter Attack (?-?)
- The Crow (1968-1970)
- Elm City Trader – Hamden, New Haven (1991-1992)
- Evening Leader (1892– ?)
- Free Press (?-?)
- Greater New Haven Black Coalition Weekly (1971-1972)
- The Heritage Hall Crow (1968– ?)
- The Indian's Friend (1902–1907)
- L'Indipendente (c. 1903– ?)
- Italian-American Weekly News (unknown)
- Milford-Orange Bulletin (2008–2018)
- New Haven Advocate (1975–2013)
- New England Anzeiger; New Haven Anzeiger (1877–1910)
- The New-Haven Chronicle, W., April 18, 1786 – Sept. 11, 1787
- New-Haven Gazette, W., May 13, 1784 – Feb. 9, 1786
- The New-Haven Gazette, W., Jan. 5-June 29, 1791
- The New-Haven Gazette, And The Connecticut Magazine, W., Feb. 16, 1786 – June 18, 1789
- New Haven Jewish Ledger (1977–1996)
- New Haven Local News (1987–1990)
- News (1879)
- The New Haven Union (1895– ?)
- Open Gate News (1961–1963)
- Palladium (1828– ?)
- La Parola Cattolica (c. 1904–1907)
- San Carlino (1907)
- Sea World Fishing Gazette (1879– ?)
- La Stella D'Italia (1892– ?)
- Svenska Connecticut Posten Och Oestens Tribun (1892-?)
- Times (1894–?)
- Union (1857– ?)
- Union (1871– ?)
- The Union Times (1941–1948)
- La Voz Hispana de Connecticut (1993–1995?)
- Workmen's Advocate (1883–1891)

==== Waterbury ====
- Black Voice (1970–1971)
- Neue Zeitung (1890– ?)
- People's Weekly (1972)
- Il Progresso di Waterbury (1907)
- Independent (1881– ?)
- Index (?-?)
- Monitor (1869– ?)
- Record (1895– ?)
- Sunday Globe (1893– ?)
- Sunday Herald (1888– ?)
- Valley Democrat (1881– ?)
- Valley Index (?-?)
- La Verita (1911, 1925)
- Waterbury American (1844–1990)
- Waterbury Beobachter/Waterbury Observer (c. 1898–1917)
- Waterbury Democrat/Waterbury Evening Democrat (1887–1946)

==== Elsewhere ====
- Ansonia Evening Sentinel; Ansonia Weekly Sentinel; Naugatuck Valley Sentinel – Ansonia (1871–1992)
- Ansonia Journal – Ansonia (1869– ?)
- Beacon Falls News – Beacon Falls (1902– ?)
- Branford Gleaner – Branford (1878–1880)
- Branford News – Branford (1878)
- Branford Opinion – Branford (1891– ?)
- Cheshire Chronicle – Cheshire (1936– ?)
- Cheshire Citizen – Cheshire (?-?)
- Citizen – Milford (1894– ?)
- Derby Transcript; Evening Transcript – Derby (1866– ?)
- East Haven Courier – East Haven, weekly, closed 2024
- Enterprise – Naugatuck (1877– ?)
- Journal – West Haven (?-?)
- News – Naugatuck (1894– ?)
- North Haven Courier – North Haven, weekly, closed 2024
- North Haven Post or North Haven Citizen – North Haven (1970-2011)
- Orange Bulletin – Orange (1985–1990)
- Orange News – Orange (1966–1972)
- Orange Town Times – Orange (1972–1976)
- Our Town – Orange (1963–2004)
- Press – Wallingford (1894– ?)
- Record – Seymour (1871– ?)
- Review – Naugatuck (1880– ?)
- Sentinel – Milford (?-?)
- Shore Line Times – Guilford, New Haven (1877– ?)
- Star News – Ansonia (1962–1963)
- Sunday Times – Wallingford (1894– ?)
- Wayside Gleanings – North Haven (1892– ?)
- Windermere Forum – Wallingford (1877– ?)

=== New London County ===
==== New London ====
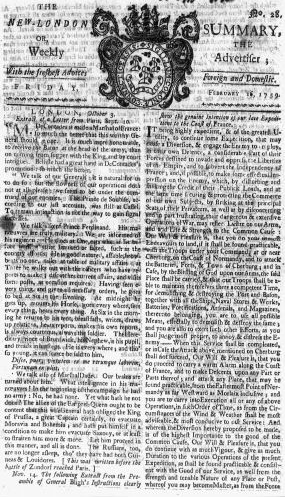
New-London Summary, Or The Weekly Advertiser, 1759

Newspapers published in New London, Connecticut:

- The Bee, W., June 14, 1797 – December 31, 1800+
- The Connecticut Gazette; Connecticut Gazette, And The Commercial Intelligencer; Connecticut Gazette, And The Universal Intelligencer, W. (1773– ?)
- Connecticut Gazette or Telegram (1872– ?)
- Globe (1891– ?)
- The New-London Advertiser, W., March 2 – April 13, 1795
- The New-London Gazette, W., November 18, 1763 – December 10, 1773
- The New-London Summary, W., sometime between May 6 and 17, 1763 – September 23, 1763
- The New-London Summary, Or The Weekly Advertiser, W., August 8, 1758 – sometime between May 6 and June 10, 1763
- Penny Press (1881– ?)
- Repository (1858–1861)
- Republican Advocate (1818–1826)
- Springer's Weekly Oracle, W., October 21, 1797 – December 28, 1800+
- Telegraph (1885–?)

==== Norwich ====
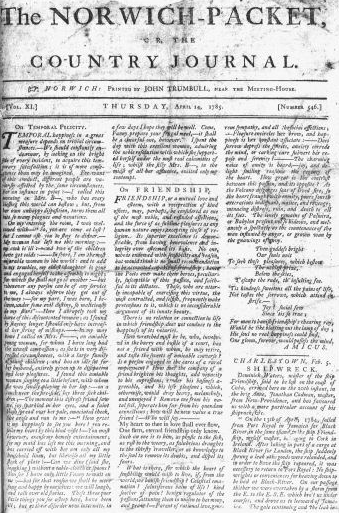
Norwich Packet or, the Country Journal, 1785

Newspapers published in Norwich, Connecticut:

- American Conflict (1879– ?)
- American Mechanic and Home Journal (1849– ?)
- Argus (?-?)
- Aurora (?-?)
- Deutsches Wochenblatt (1895– ?)
- Evening Record or Cooley's Weekly (1876– ?)
- Index (1896– ?)
- The Liberty Bell and Workingmen's Advocate (1867– ?)
- News (1881– ?)
- The Norwich Packet (1773– ?)
  - aka The Norwich Packet; And The Connecticut, Massachusetts, New-Hampshire, And Rhode-Island Weekly Advertiser; The Norwich Packet And The Country Journal; The Norwich Packet And The Weekly Advertiser; The Norwich Packet, Or The Chronicle Of Freedom; The Norwich-Packet, Or The Country Journal; Vox Populi Norwich Packet; The Connecticut Centinel
- Post (1893– ?)
- Star (1880– ?)
- Weekly Observer (1879–?)
- The Weekly Register, W., November 29, 1791 – August 19, 1795

==== Stonington ====
Newspapers published in Stonington, Connecticut:

- Impartial Journal, W., Oct. 8 (?) 1799 – Dec. 30, 1800+
- Journal of the Times, W., Oct. 10, 1798 – Sept. 17, 1799
- Mystic Journal (1859– ?)
- Mystic Press (1873– ?)
- Stonington Mirror or Mirror and Mystic Journal (1869–1943)
- Sun (1891– ?)

==== Elsewhere ====
- Connecticut Eastern News – East Lyme (1894– ?)
- Eastern Connecticut News – Groton (1946– ?)
- The Lyme Times – Lyme (2020–2024)
- Pequot Times – Ledyard (1992– ?)
- Review/Pioneer – Groton (1888– ?)
- Sound Breeze – Lyme (1889– ?)
- The Sub – Groton (? –1946)

=== Tolland County ===
- Coventry Local Register – Coventry (1857– ?)
- Journal – Vernon (1867– ?)
- The Press; Tolland County Press – Stafford (1857–1935)
- Reminder News – Vernon (1949-2024)
- Rockville Journal – Vernon (1911–1924)
- Tolland County Journal – Vernon (1866– ?)
- Tolland County Leader – Vernon (1879– ?)

=== Windham County ===
==== Windham ====
Newspapers published in Windham, Connecticut:

- Enterprise (unknown dates)
- Journal or Willimantic Journal (1847–1911)
- The Phenix, Or Windham Herald, W., March 12, 1791 – April 12, 1798
- Windham Herald, W., April 19, 1798 – December 26, 1800

==== Elsewhere ====
- Cleaner – Canterbury (1882– ?)
- Fashist – Putnam (1933–1941)
- Journal – Plainfield (1880– ?)
- Mirror – Brooklyn (1884– ?)
- Putnam County News – Putnam (unknown dates)
- Putnam Patriot; Windham County Observer & Patriot – Putnam (1872–1963)
- Sentinel or Democratic Sentinel – Killingly (1870– ?)
- Times – Canterbury (1881– ?)
- Transcript – Killingly (1854– ?)
- Unionist – Brooklyn (1833– ?)
- Weekly Pennant – Brooklyn (1842– ?)
- Windham County Press – Killingly (unknown dates)
- Windham County Standard – Putnam (1872– ?)
- Windham County Transcript – Killingly (1854– ?)

== See also ==
- List of newspapers in Connecticut in the 18th century
- List of radio stations in Connecticut
- List of television stations in Connecticut

Adjoining states

- List of newspapers in Massachusetts
- List of newspapers in New York
- List of newspapers in Rhode Island

Comprehensive

- Lists of newspapers
- List of newspapers in the United States

Frequency

- List of free daily newspapers in the United States
- List of weekly newspapers in the United States

Circulation

- List of international newspapers originating in the United States
- List of national newspapers in the United States
- List of newspapers in the United States by circulation

Foreign language

- List of French-language newspapers published in the United States
- List of German-language newspapers published in the United States
- List of Spanish-language newspapers published in the United States

Specialty

- List of African-American newspapers in the United States
- List of alternative weekly newspapers in the United States
- List of business newspapers in the United States
- List of family-owned newspapers in the United States
- List of Jewish newspapers in the United States
- List of LGBTQ periodicals in the United States
- List of student newspapers in the United States
- List of supermarket tabloids in the United States
- List of underground press in the United States

Other

- List of defunct newspapers of the United States
