= 1913–1914 Shelton silk strike =

Labor strike in Connecticut, US

- Date: November 12, 1913 – January 30, 1914
- Location: Shelton, Connecticut
- Methods: Strikes, protest, demonstrations

Parties
| Industrial Workers of the World Local 528, Branch 2 | Sidney Blumenthal & Company, private strikebreakers, local police |

Casualties and losses
- 2 dead

The 1913–1914 Shelton silk strike was a work stoppage involving silk mill workers at the Sidney Blumenthal & Company mill in Shelton, Connecticut. The striking workers, many of which hailed from Eastern Europe, were affiliated with the Industrial Workers of the World (IWW). The strike was violently combated by private strikebreakers, as well as local police forces from Shelton and the surrounding towns and cities. The strike attracted significant local media attention, in part due to the unusual deaths of two people uninvolved with the strike at the hands of strikebreakers: an infant that froze to death after private strikebreakers broke into the house of local strikers to abduct them, and a man whacked over the head with a pool cue on the assumption that he was a violent striker.

Amid heightened concern about the size and duration of the strike, as well as the violence associated with it, the Borough of Shelton assembled a third-party committee, which denounced the tactics employed by the IWW. Local IWW leaders in turn denounced the committee, but the strength of the picket line dramatically diminished following the committee's findings, and the strike ultimately fizzled out.

== Background ==
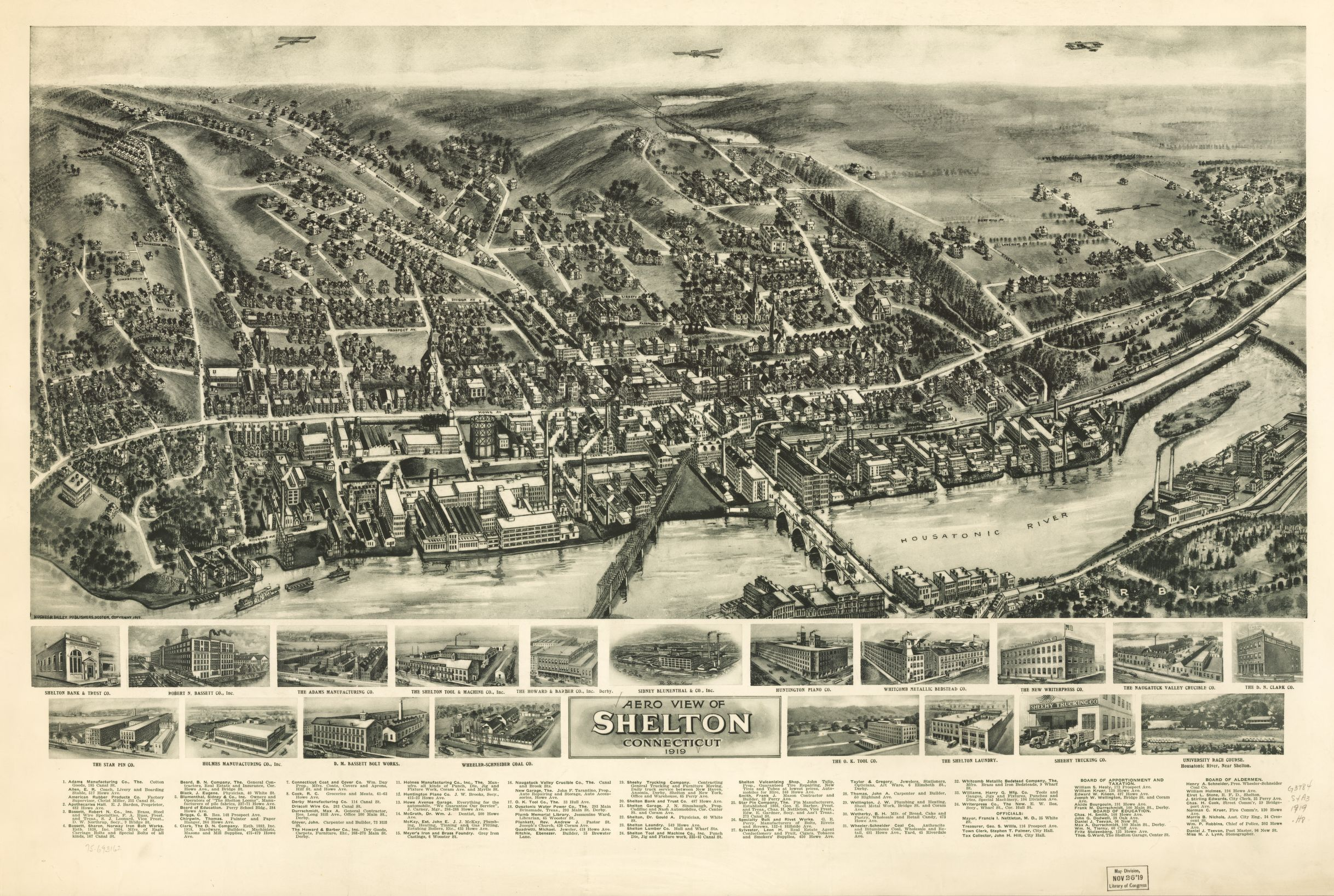
An aerial map of Shelton in 1919, several years after the strike, including a depiction of the Sidney Blumenthal & Company mill where the strike occurred

Shelton, Connecticut, located along the Housatonic River in Fairfield County, Connecticut, significantly industrialized in the late 19th century, owing to the construction of a dam and canal along the Housatonic River in the city, its railroad connections, and its proximity to several other cities, including New York City. In 1897, Sidney Blumenthal & Company, a producer of silk and other fabrics, moved production from New York City to Shelton.

The Industrial Workers of the World (IWW), a once-major labor union influenced by socialist and syndicalist thought, had been active throughout Connecticut during the early 20th century. IWW-affiliated paper workers had launched a strike in New Haven in 1906, and IWW-affiliated metalworkers had launched a strike in nearby Bridgeport in 1907.

== Course of the strike ==
=== November 1913 ===
On November 12, 1913, about 150 weavers employed at Sidney Blumenthal & Company went on strike to protest their wages. The workers, who stated that they had made about $3-4 per day, had presented demands for better pay to the company several days prior, but were rejected and fired. Most were re-hired shortly after, where they unionized with the Industrial Workers of the World (IWW). On November 12th, they reiterated their demands, were once more rejected, and walked out on the job, and marched through the streets of Shelton. The Hartford Courant noted in its article coverage the start of the strike that the workers were "practically all non-English speaking".

Within the first week of the strike, demonstrations were peaceful, and a local Polish-American priest had been in discussion with the strikers to try to settle the strike. By November 18, the Stamford Advocate reported that 225 workers were partaking in the strike, and that IWW officers arrived in Shelton to meet with the strikers. By that time, Sidney Blumenthal had announced that it had made preparations to bring strikebreakers into Shelton to interfere with the strike.

On the evening of November 20, IWW organizer Matilda Rabinovitz had convened a mass meeting attended by 1,000 people, where she urged all of the plant's approximately 1,500 workers to join the strike. The following day, the strike reached approximately 600 workers. At that time, Sidney Blumenthal had employed about 100 strikebreakers to combat the strike, and hired private security to patrol its mill. Local police had also established a presence around the mill.

=== December 1913 ===
By mid-December, the size and duration of the strike required that policemen from other local departments be sent in to Shelton, even though it was reported that some of the strikers had already returned to work. Several strikers were arrested, accused of causing disturbances at the mill.

Tensions between the strikers and strikebreakers erupted into the open by late December. On the evening of December 26th, a "riot" broke out between the two sides, with the Hartford Courant reporting that "stones were thrown and revolvers discharged but no one was seriously injured". A man thought to be the strikers' leader was arrested. A larger "riot" broke out on the morning of December 29th, started by a strikebreaker who assaulted a worker. Police reinforcements from Bridgeport were called in to help break the strike, and the nine people arrested that morning resulted in the overflow of Shelton's small number of holding cells. The Bridgeport Evening Farmer reported that "most people here believe that the violence is invited and stimulated by the conduct of the special agents, who are said to insult and aggravate the strikers in many ways. The latter, it is believed, desire to conduct themselves peaceably. The condition is further aggravated by the presence of I.W.W. leaders, who counsel meeting violence with violence".

Tensions escalated further the following day, when a woman was reportedly shot by a special agent of Sidney Blumenthal while doing picket duty for the strikers. Eight people were arrested that day. That day, IWW organizer Matilda Rabinovitz claimed that the IWW had unionized nearly all of the Sidney Blumenthal workers, and that over 900 employees would be participating in the strike.

=== January 1914 ===
On New Year's Day, the striking workers stayed home to enjoy the holiday, as if they were granted the day off.

However, the following day saw the first death directly attributable to the strike. Strikebreakers employed by Sidney Blumenthal broke into the home of striking worker Michael Komick, and arrested him and his wife, but left their two-month old baby, Caroline Komick, behind in her crib, with no one to attend to her. The strikebreakers left the Komick's doors and windows open after arresting Michael Komick and his wife, bringing the cold January air into the house, where Caroline remained lying in her crib. She then died due to malnutrition and exposure to the cold. The Komick parents were beaten by the company strikebreakers, and Michael Komick was sentenced to 15 days in jail after the strikebreakers alleged that they had hot water and ashes thrown onto them. Tensions were further inflamed when the Komick's landlord demanded that tenants pay for any damages that occurred in connection with the strike, resulting in the IWW declaring a rent strike in opposition to this policy. On that day, Shelton began importing police from New Haven to aid with breaking up the strike.

The next day, a funeral and procession was held for the Komick's baby, which was attended by over 300 townspeople, many of whom were Polish-American. The van of the cortege was decorated by a floral cross with the inscription "Branch No. 2, Local 528, Textile Workers of the I.W.W.". In court that day, local police testified that the baby's death was attributable to her mother's negligence, and that her parent's detention did not cause her death.

On January 7th, the strike was partially paused for the celebration of Orthodox Christmas, although in neighboring Derby, a group of 300 workers and sympathizers gathered to protest strikebreaking employees as they crossed the bridge into Shelton for work.

On the evening of January 12th, a visiting man named Alex Havrilla was walking past a local bar in Shelton right as a stone was thrown into the open door of the bar, which was known to have been frequented by local guards employed by the mill. Allegedly, a mill guard told the bartender, Frank Pinto, that the stone was thrown by a visiting man walking out in front of the bar named Alex Havrilla. Havrilla was traveling from out of town, and reportedly had no knowledge of the strike and the local situation, but the mill guards at the bar allegedly believed Havrilla to be a striker who threw the stone at the bar to target the guards who frequented it. After brief chase, a pair of mill guards and Pinto apprehended Havrilla, and Pinto whacked him over the head with a pool cue, shattering Havrilla's skull. Havrilla would die in a hospital from said wounds on January 27th.

By mid-January, many of the striking workers began returning to work, and Sidney Blumenthal stated that it had gotten most of its looms back online. On January 19th, the government of the Borough of Shelton called for a special meeting to deliberate on a possible solution to the strike. The mayor subsequently made a plea to the striking workers to accept an offer from Sidney Blumenthal that would end the strike, enforce a 55-hour work week, pay workers on a weekly instead of semi-weekly basis, and vow not to reduce worker pay. This proposal was roundly rejected by the striking workers.

==== Formation of a Borough committee ====
By January 23rd, the striking workers had agreed to delegate a committee of workers to talk to Sidney Blumenthal about ending the strike, although the company rejected any talks until the striking workers returned to work. That evening, the Borough of Shelton held a meeting to appoint its own committee to meet with the company to end the strike. The five person Borough committee comprised Samuel E. Beardsley, the head of the Socialist Party in Connecticut, Judge J. B. Dillon, Samuel Preston, Borough Warden Barlow, and postmaster William Holmes.

Just five days later, the Borough committee issued a report which largely denounced the tactics employed by the IWW. The report utilized excerpts from IWW literature which asserted the right for striking workers to engage in acts of industrial sabotage, which The Day reported was something many of the striking workers were unaware that the union endorsed, and disagreed with. The release of the report prompted a mass meeting of striking workers, at which, IWW organizer Matilda Rabinowitz defended the IWW literature called into question, and argued that striking workers had the right to engage in sabotage. There was an "acrimonious" debate around the IWW's tactics, which culminated in a vote on a proposal to return to work, which was defeated, 60-160. The Day reported that it was believed that many of those who voted to return to work went on to apply for their old positions back the following day, further weakening the power of the striking workers.

On January 30th, many of the remaining striking workers held an informal vote to return to work, which now succeeded, and was formally ratified that evening. Sidney Blumenthal, in turn, promised to observe a law which required them to pay their employees weekly, and reduce the work week at the mill to 55 hours. However, the IWW contested this, and held a formal vote to rescind the declaration to return to work, which narrowly passed, 37-33.

== Aftermath ==
By February 1st, Rabinowitz had left Shelton, and stopped in Stamford to visit relatives, where the Stamford Advocate interviewed her. Reportedly visibly tired and in poor health due to her efforts in the Shelton strike, Rabinowitz struck a defiant tone, declaring that Samuel E. Beardsley, the Connecticut head of the Socialist Party who served on the Borough committee that condemned the IWW's role in the strike, had effectively broken the strike, and called him an enemy of industrial unionism.

The Stamford Advocate reported that by February 2nd, "several hundred" former employees of Sidney Blumenthal had applied to get their old jobs back, where they were obliged to submit in writing that they were not members of the IWW. However, those who were employed in professions other than weavers were told that they were not wanted, and one former weaver told the Bridgeport Evening Farmer that approximately half of the mill's 300 weavers wouldn't return to Sidney Blumenthal, and would instead search for work elsewhere.

== See also ==
- 1907 Skowhegan textile strike
- 1912 Lawrence textile strike
- 1913 Ipswich Mills strike
- 1913 Paterson silk strike
- History of Connecticut industry
- Hopedale strike
