= New Haven Register =

Newspaper in New Haven, Connecticut

- Type: Daily newspaper
- Format: Broadsheet
- Owner: Hearst Communications
- Publisher: Mike Deluca
- Founded: 1812
- Headquarters: 100 Gando Drive, New Haven, Connecticut, United States
- Circulation: 89,022 Daily (as of 2006)
- Website: nhregister.com

The New Haven Register is a daily newspaper published in New Haven, Connecticut. It is owned by Hearst Communications. The Register's main office is located at 100 Gando Drive in New Haven. The Register was established about 1812 and is one of the oldest continuously published newspapers in the U.S. In the early 20th century it was bought by John Day Jackson. The Jackson family owned the Register, published weekday evenings and Saturday and Sunday mornings, and The Journal-Courier, a morning weekday paper, until they were combined in 1987 into a seven-day morning Register.

The Register covers 19 towns and cities within New Haven and Middlesex counties, including New Haven. The newspaper also had one reporter in Hartford, the state capital, who covered state politics, but as of March 2008 removed that reporter, leaving New Haven's major daily without day-to-day coverage of state offices and the General Assembly. In order to fill that void, the paper signed a deal with CTNewsJunkie.com to provide coverage of the Connecticut state government.

== History ==
The New Haven Register dates back to 1812, when it was founded as the Columbian Register.

Beginning in 1840, the paper began publishing a daily edition called the Evening Register. A Sunday edition, called the Sunday Register, began in 1879 or 1880.

In the late 19th century, the Register was often considered aligned with the Democratic Party.

In the early 20th century, the John Day Jackson family, which also owned the Journal-Courier, purchased the Register. Following the purchase, the two papers worked in the same building, and had some shared staff.

The Register underwent both a newsroom union decertification and a suit brought by women newsroom employees, both successful, in the late 1970s and 1980s. It enjoyed its highest circulation, peaking at more than 100,000, in the mid-1980s. Dave Solomon was a sportswriter at the paper for 35 years, writing a long-running column called I Was Thinking.

In 1987, the New Haven Register absorbed the Journal-Courier.

John Day Jackson passed control of the papers to his sons, Richard and Lionel Jackson, then to Lionel's son, Lionel "Stewart" Jackson Jr. In 1989, the paper was sold to the Goodson Newspaper Group, headed by television producer Mark Goodson. Within the same year, Goodson sold it to Ingersoll Publications, headed by Ralph Ingersoll. The next year, it was sold to the Journal Register Company.

On February 21, 2009, the Journal Register Company and twenty-six (26) of its affiliates (including the Register), filed for Chapter 11 of the United States Bankruptcy Code. On March 4, 2012, the Register closed its printing operation and sourced printing of the newspaper to the Hartford Courant. In September 2012, the Journal Register Company again filed for bankruptcy. It had emerged afterwards as part of Digital First Media, a merger between the Journal Register Company and MediaNews Group.

On September 20, 2014, the Register officially relocated its headquarters closer to the North Haven, Connecticut, city line. The former Register building was renovated and became a Jordan's Furniture.

In 2017, Digital First Media sold the paper to Hearst Newspapers.

In 2024, the newspaper moved its newsroom out of New Haven and into the Record-Journal's office in Meriden, which Hearst had acquired the year prior.

== Competitors ==
As of 2015, the paper had a weekday circulation of 64,210, the second largest in the state after the Hartford Courant.

Its main daily competitors are new Hearst stablemate the Post, located in Bridgeport, which covers Stratford, Milford, and portions of the lower Naugatuck Valley (Ansonia, Derby, Oxford, Seymour, and Shelton), and the Waterbury Republican-American, which covers Greater Waterbury, Litchfield County, and the Naugatuck Valley.

The Register also shares part of its circulation area with Elm City Newspapers, a chain of weekly newspapers which also share an owner and a New Haven headquarters building with the Register.

== See also ==
- List of newspapers in Connecticut
