= Mick LaSalle =

American film critic

- Born: May 7, 1959 (age 67); Brooklyn, New York, U.S.
- Occupations: Film critic, writer, author
- Spouse: Amy Freed

Mick LaSalle (born May 7, 1959) is an American film critic and the author of two books on pre-Code Hollywood. Up to December 2025, he had written approximately 5,000 reviews for the San Francisco Chronicle and he podcasted about them from 2005 to 2010.

== Life and career ==
LaSalle is the author of Complicated Women: Sex and Power in Pre-Code Hollywood, a history/critical study of the actresses who worked in the film industry between 1929 and 1934. It was published by Thomas Dunne Books in 2000. In his review in The New York Times, Andy Webster called it "an overdue examination of a historic conflict between Hollywood and would-be monitors of morality" and added LaSalle "has an avuncular but informative style, and makes his points with a relaxed economy."

The book served as the basis for the documentary film Complicated Women, directed by Hugh Munro Neely and narrated by Jane Fonda, which originally was broadcast by Turner Classic Movies in May 2003. LaSalle provided commentary for and was associate producer of the project.

LaSalle's follow-up to Complicated Women was Dangerous Men: Pre-Code Hollywood and the Birth of the Modern Man, published by Thomas Dunne in 2002. LaSalle has lectured on film subjects at various film festivals, including those in the Hamptons, Denver, Las Vegas, and Mill Valley and at New York City's Film Forum and San Francisco's Castro Theatre. His third book, The Beauty of the Real: What Hollywood Can Learn From Contemporary French Actresses, was published in 2012. His fourth book, Dream State: California in the Movies (Heyday Books), was published in 2021.

In the late 1990s, LaSalle was the on-air film critic for KGO-TV. He was a panelist at the 2006, 2007, 2008, 2011, 2012, 2013, 2014, 2016, 2018, 2019, 2023 and 2025 Venice Film Festivals. He was also a panelist at the 2009 Berlin International Film Festival. In addition to his reviews, he answers film-related questions in the Chronicle column Ask Mick LaSalle. As the primary film critic for the Chronicle, LaSalle's reviews appear in all the Chronicle's sister newspapers of the Hearst chain, including the Connecticut Post, the Albany Times-Union, the San Antonio Express-News and the Houston Chronicle.

== Personal life ==
LaSalle is married to playwright Amy Freed.
