= Reminder =

Reminder may refer to:

== Music ==
- "Reminder" (song), a song by The Weeknd from his 2016 album Starboy
- Reminder (album), a 2012 album by Pixel
- A Reminder, a 2011 EP by Drake Bell
- The Reminder, a 2007 album by Feist
- "Reminder", a song by Jay-Z from his 2009 album The Blueprint 3
- "Reminder", a song by Mumford & Sons from their 2012 album Babel
- "Reminders", a song by Gwen Stefani from her 2024 album Bouquet

== Other uses ==
- ReminderNews, a newspaper in eastern Connecticut
- Reminder software, calendar-type programs
  - Reminders (Apple), an Apple task management program
- The Reminder (Flin Flon), a Canadian newspaper
- The Reminder (Springfield), a Massachusetts newspaper
