= Connecticut Magazine =

American monthly magazine

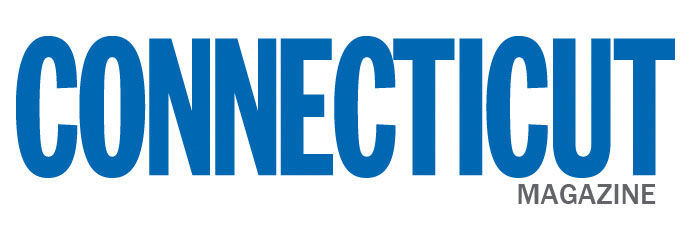
- Categories: Regional magazine
- Frequency: Monthly
- Publisher: Hearst Communications
- First issue: 1971 (54 years ago)
- Country: United States
- Based in: New Haven, Connecticut U.S.
- Language: English
- Website: www.ctinsider.com/connecticutmagazine/
- ISSN: 0889-7670

Connecticut Magazine is an American monthly magazine covering the life, culture, politics, and style of the state of Connecticut. Founded in 1971, it was purchased in 2017 by the Hearst Corporation. It is a sister magazine of The Connecticut Bride. It is unrelated to the magazine The Connecticut, published from circa 1898 to 1908.

== History ==
Connecticut Magazine, based in New Haven, Connecticut, was founded in 1971. It is unrelated to the magazine The Connecticut, published from circa 1898 to 1908.

On June 5, 2017, the Hearst Corporation purchased Digital First Media, absorbing Connecticut Magazine as well as the Connecticut newspapers The Middletown Press, The New Haven Register, and The Register Citizen, in Torrington, and the weekly publications The Post-Chronicle, The Milford-Orange Bulletin, The ShoreLine Times, The Dolphin, in Groton, The West Hartford News, The Foothills Trader, in Torrington, The Litchfield County Times and The Fairfield & Westport Minuteman.

== Offices and personnel ==
Connecticut Magazine is based at 100 Gando Drive, New Haven, Connecticut.

- Group Publisher and President: Mike DeLuca
- Managing Editor: Lidia Ryan
- Assistant Managing Editor: TinaMarie Craven
- Designer: Bryan Haeffele

== Annual issues ==
The magazine's biggest annual issues are lists including: "Best Restaurants (Readers' Choice)," "Best Doctors," "Top Dentists," and "Best of Connecticut."

== Sections ==
The magazine's dining section includes reviews, recipes, and restaurant listings. The health section lists the best doctors and dentists in the state. The Connecticut Bride tab shows different weddings and tips/where to buy for your wedding.

The magazine listed its "40 under 40" list in January 2019, for 40 up-and-coming people from Connecticut under the age of 40.

== Awards ==
2016 Connecticut SPJ Awards

The editorial team won six awards including three first-place prizes. Michael Lee-Murphy won top honors in the magazine arts and entertainment category. Lee-Murphy also took a first-place award for his local reporting. Lee-Murphy and Erik Ofgang won the top award in the education category. Ofgang also won two second-place awards for in-depth reporting and another feature story. Kate Hartman and Albie Yuravich won third-place in the leisure category.

2017 Connecticut SPJ Awards

The editorial team won eight awards, including seven first-place prizes. The magazine won first-place for their examination of every shoreline community's plans to deal with rising sea levels. Michael Lee-Murphy won a first-place honors for a crime story. Lee-Murphy also won two first-places in two sports categories. Erik Ofgang won first place for a health story and third place for a feature. Greg Moody won first place for his infographic. Albie Yuravich won first place for his trifecta of magazine headlines.
