= Black Rock Beacon (disambiguation) =

The Black Rock Beacon is a Burning Man newspaper founded in 2005 out of the Black Rock Gazette.

Black Rock Beacon may also refer to:

- Black Rock Beacon, a newspaper based in Black Rock, New York from 1823 until 1824. Also known as the Beacon, it was created and published by L.G. Hoffman. It was weekly, with Vol. 1. No. 1 published on January 9, 1823, ending around September 1824.
- Black Rock Beacon (Bridgeport), a former weekly newspaper in Connecticut

== See also ==
- Black Rock (disambiguation)
