= New Century Network =

News aggregator website

The New Century Network is a defunct aggregator of news content that was run by a consortium of nine newspaper companies. The company launched in 1995 during the time when the World Wide Web first started to enter the public consciousness, and ceased operations in March 1998.

== History ==
New Century Networks was formed in April of 1995 as a collaborative effort among the major newspaper companies to aggregate their content. The founding companies -- Knight-Ridder, Tribune Company, Times Mirror, Advance Publications, Cox Enterprises, Gannett Company, Hearst Corporation, and The Washington Post Company -- each contributed $1 million to fund the company. Peter Winter was appointed as CEO. The New York Times Company joined the following month.

Over its 3-year life, the nine member companies reportedly poured $25 million into the venture. Leadership and management struggled to find a workable business model, as the participating companies had different ideas about the best direction for the company; Tribune Co. became so exasperated at NCN that they joined America Online in offering a network of local city guides with them. Small papers worried of neglect and lack of power in the organization, and large papers feared it would take away page views from them if it became too popular. As a result, official links to New Century Networks were often small and hidden at the member newspapers.

In February 1998, New Century Networks shut down NewsWorks, its main news aggregation website, and laid off a third of its staff. It changed itself to a search engine of the major affiliated newspapers instead, and moved to reorient its purpose toward advertising. Instead, two weeks later, the board of directors voted to close the company entirely.

== References and links ==
- New Media Meltdown at New Century
- New Century Network Shuttered; 40 Lose Jobs
- 5 Ways Newspapers Botched the Web
- That Sinking Feeling, CIO Web Business, Nov. 1998.
- New Century Network: A Critical Moment for Newspapers at the Dawn of the Internet
