= List of newspapers published by MediaNews Group =

This is a list of newspapers published by Digital First Media, the successor to 21st Century Media.

The company owns daily and weekly newspapers, and other print media properties and newspaper-affiliated local Websites in the U.S. states of Michigan, New York, Ohio, Pennsylvania, and New Jersey, organized in five geographic "clusters":

== Capital-Saratoga ==
Three dailies, associated weeklies and pennysavers in greater Albany, New York

- The Oneida Daily Dispatch'' of Oneida, New York
- The Record of Troy, New York
- The Saratogian of Saratoga Springs, New York
- Weeklies:
  - Community News weekly of Clifton Park, New York
  - Rome Observer of Rome, New York
  - WG Life of Wilton, New York
  - Ballston Spa Life of Ballston Spa, New York
  - Greenbush Life of Troy, New York
  - Latham Life of Latham, New York
  - River Life of Troy, New York

== Michigan ==
Four dailies, associated weeklies, and pennysavers in the state of Michigan

- Oakland Press of Oakland
- Daily Tribune of Royal Oak
- The Macomb Daily of Mt. Clemens
- Morning Sun of Mount Pleasant
- Heritage Newspapers
  - Belleville View
  - Ile Camera
  - Monroe Guardian
  - Ypsilanti Courier
  - News-Herald
  - Press & Guide
  - Chelsea Standard & Dexter Leader
  - Manchester Enterprise
  - Milan News-Leader
  - Saline Reporter
- Independent Newspapers
  - Advisor
  - Source
- Morning Star
  - The Leader & Kalkaskian
  - Grand Traverse Insider
  - Alma Reminder
  - Alpena Star
  - Ogemaw/Oscoda County Star
  - Presque Isle Star
  - St. Johns Reminder
- Voice Newspapers
  - Armada Times
  - Bay Voice
  - Blue Water Voice
  - Downriver Voice
  - Macomb Township Voice
  - North Macomb Voice
  - Weekend Voice

== Mid-Hudson ==
One daily, associated magazines in the Hudson River Valley of New York

- Daily Freeman of Kingston, New York

== Ohio ==
Two dailies and associated magazines

- The News-Herald of Willoughby
- The Morning Journal of Lorain
- El Latino Expreso of Lorain

== Philadelphia area ==
Seven dailies and associated weeklies and magazines in Pennsylvania and New Jersey

- The Daily Local News of West Chester
- Delaware County Daily and Sunday Times of Primos Upper Darby Township, Pennsylvania
- The Mercury of Pottstown
- The Reporter of Lansdale
- The Times Herald of Norristown
- The Trentonian of Trenton, New Jersey
- Weeklies
- The Phoenix of Phoenixville, Pennsylvania
  - El Latino Expreso of Trenton, New Jersey
  - La Voz of Norristown, Pennsylvania
  - The Tri County Record of Morgantown, Pennsylvania
  - Penny Pincher of Pottstown, Pennsylvania
- Chesapeake Publishing
  - The Kennett Paper of Kennett Square, Pennsylvania
  - Avon Grove Sun of West Grove, Pennsylvania
  - The Central Record of Medford, New Jersey
  - Maple Shade Progress of Maple Shade, New Jersey
- Intercounty Newspapers
  - The Pennington Post of Pennington, New Jersey
  - The Bristol Pilot of Bristol, Pennsylvania
  - Yardley News of Yardley, Pennsylvania
  - Advance of Bucks County of Newtown, Pennsylvania
  - Record Breeze of Berlin, New Jersey
  - Community News of Pemberton, New Jersey
- Montgomery Newspapers
  - Ambler Gazette of Ambler, Pennsylvania
  - The Colonial of Plymouth Meeting, Pennsylvania
  - Glenside News of Glenside, Pennsylvania
  - The Globe of Lower Moreland Township, Pennsylvania
  - Montgomery Life of Fort Washington, Pennsylvania
  - North Penn Life of Lansdale, Pennsylvania
  - Perkasie News Herald of Perkasie, Pennsylvania
  - Public Spirit of Hatboro, Pennsylvania
  - Souderton Independent of Souderton, Pennsylvania
  - Springfield Sun of Springfield, Pennsylvania
  - Spring-Ford Reporter of Royersford, Pennsylvania
  - Times Chronicle of Jenkintown, Pennsylvania
  - Valley Item of Perkiomenville, Pennsylvania
  - Willow Grove Guide of Willow Grove, Pennsylvania
  - The Review of Roxborough, Philadelphia, Pennsylvania
- Main Line Media News
  - Main Line Times of Ardmore, Pennsylvania
  - Main Line Life of Ardmore, Pennsylvania
  - The King of Prussia Courier of King of Prussia, Pennsylvania
- Delaware County News Network
  - News of Delaware County of Havertown, Pennsylvania
  - County Press of Newtown Square, Pennsylvania
  - Garnet Valley Press of Glen Mills, Pennsylvania
  - Springfield Press of Springfield, Pennsylvania
  - Town Talk of Ridley, Pennsylvania
- Berks-Mont Newspapers
  - The Berks-Mont News of Boyertown, Pennsylvania
  - The Kutztown Area Patriot of Kutztown, Pennsylvania
  - The Hamburg Area Item of Hamburg, Pennsylvania
  - The Southern Berks News of Exeter Township, Berks County, Pennsylvania
  - Community Connection of Boyertown, Pennsylvania
- Magazines
  - Bucks Co. Town & Country Living
  - Parents Express
  - Real Men, Rednecks
