= Oneida Dispatch =

Defunct magazine

The Oneida Dispatch originated as an independent printed newspaper. It is now part of a large newsgroup that includes newspapers in Michigan. New Jersey, New York, Ohio and Pennsylvania. The paper's print frequency has been reduced, and it has added an online news website, often referred to as the Oneida Daily Dispatch. The paper's coverage goes beyond local and regional stories to include national and international news.

== History ==
The newspaper was founded in 1863 as the Oneida Weekly Dispatch in Oneida, New York, becoming a daily named Oneida Dispatch shortly thereafter. In 1926 it began publishing under the name Oneida Daily Dispatch, although it did not print a Sunday edition. The name Oneida Daily Dispatch now refers to the three-times-per-week print edition; the newspaper is produced Tuesdays, Thursdays, and Sundays.

The paper shares material with sister publications The Record, in Troy, The Saratogian and The Daily Freeman in Kingston, as well as other upstate New York newspapers.

The newspaper's 2013 bankruptcy led Alden Global Capital to purchase Oneida's parent corporation.
