= Dave Solomon (journalist) =

Dave Solomon (1952 – August 6, 2011) was a Connecticut sportswriter and newspaper columnist.

Originally from the Bronx, Solomon was graduated from the University of Connecticut in 1974. He was sports editor of the university's newspaper Daily Campus, and at the same time wrote for the Hartford Times. He moved to the New Haven Register in 1976, for which he covered sports for the next 35 years. Eventually he became a columnist, regularly contributing under the title I Was Thinking.

A member of the Pro Football Writers of America and the Baseball Writers' Association of America, Solomon was honored by the Associated Press and the Society of Professional Journalists, and received the Bill Keish Award for media service to the Walter Camp Football Foundation.

Senator Joe Lieberman called Solomon a "Connecticut journalistic institution."
