= The Middletown Press =

Newspaper in Middletown, Connecticut

- Type: Daily newspaper
- Format: Broadsheet
- Owner: Hearst Communications
- Founded: 1878, as the Middlesex Monitor
- Headquarters: 386 Main Street 4th Floor, Middletown, Connecticut 06457 United States
- Website: middletownpress.com

The Middletown Press is a daily newspaper based in Middletown, Connecticut that is the main newspaper of Middletown and its surrounding area in Middlesex County, Connecticut.

== History ==
It was founded in 1878 as the Middlesex Monitor, a daily flyer, by Ernest King and his son Ernest. It carried information about the 1884 presidential elections. It became a one-cent daily newspaper (also called a penny press). The name would later change to The Evening Press when its price went up to two cents in 1918, and one year later it became The Middletown Press in 1919.

“It was blatantly a Democratic paper in a town dominated by Democrats,” in its early history, according to Elizabeth A. Warner, author of A Pictorial History of Middletown, who credits the overt political affiliation as part of the reason for its success.

Competitors then or over the years included weekly papers The Sentinel and Witness and The Constitution and daily The Daily Herald (all of which may not have been Middletown focused). Direct competition on Middletown news was provided by The Middletown Tribune, a Republican newspaper, that was established in 1893 and operated until 1906, and later by The Middletown Times which operated during 1913-1914. Otherwise, "the Middletown Press had a monopoly on Middletown news."

It was later owned by Berkshire, Massachusetts-based Eagle Publishing Company, publisher of the Berkshire Eagle and other papers. The Eagle's last independent publisher was Michael G. Miller, grandson of Kelton Bedell Miller, who founded the paper. Michael was president of The Eagle Publishing Company which owned The Eagle, the Middletown Press in Middletown, Connecticut, and two daily newspapers in Vermont: the Bennington Banner and the Brattleboro Reformer, as well as a weekly newspaper, the Journal in Manchester, Vermont; his brother Mark C. Miller was editor of The Eagle, while brother Kelton B. Miller II was publisher of the Vermont newspapers. A sister, Margo Miller, a writer for The Boston Globe, sat on Eagle Publishing's board. The Eagle paper was said to be struggling financially in the early 1990s, burdened by mismanagement and debt incurred by the decision to purchase new multi-million dollar four-color printing presses. That purchase necessitated that the company expand into larger quarters.

In 1995, The Middletown Press was purchased, along with other New England newspapers, by MediaNews Group. It was sold soon after to Journal Register Company.

In 2013, the Journal Register Company became known as 21st Century Media, an American media company.

- 21st Century Media was an American media company, serving an audience of 21 million Americans in 992 communities. It is the successor of Ingersoll Publications and Journal Register Company.
- The company operated more than 350 multi-platform products in 992 communities. On April 5, 2013, the assets of Journal Register Company and its affiliates were sold to 21st CMH Acquisition Co. The Journal Register Company then became known as 21st Century Media.

The company was led by CEO John Paton who openly blogged about the changes he is making to transform Journal Register from a newspaper company to a "digital first, print last" company. Paton, formerly CEO of ImpreMedia, started on February 1, 2010 by announcing he would provide all reporters with Flip video cameras as a sign of his commitment to the company's digital transformation.

- On March 17, 2010, the company named an advisory board composed of new media visionary Jeff Jarvis (author of "What Would Google Do" and BuzzMachine); Jay Rosen of New York University who is currently running the innovative Studio 20 program at NYU and who writes pressthink.org (Rosen is also a former member of Wikimedia Foundation's advisory board); and Emily Bell, the director of the Tow Center for Digital Journalism at Columbia University.
- On March 11, 2010, the company named Bill Higginson, Journal Register's former Senior Vice President, Production, as the company's President and COO. *On March 4, 2010, the company named Jeff Bairstow as chief financial officer. Bairstow joined Journal Register after working for Synarc Inc., a leading provider of medical imaging analysis, subject-recruitment and biochemical-marker services.
- In 2013, MediaNews Group and 21st Century Media merged into Digital First Media.

It was included in the Connecticut cluster of newspapers, one of six clusters, owned by 21st Century Media. In 2017, 21st Century Media/Digital First Media sold its Connecticut papers to Hearst Communications.

The Middletown Press is now a daily broadsheet which covers news in the Middletown area. The Hartford Courant is a daily broadsheet which includes a Middletown story in every issue.

== See also ==
- Record-Journal, daily newspaper of Meriden, Connecticut, nearby
- List of newspapers in Connecticut
- List of newspapers published by 21st Century Media
