= Wendy Metcalfe =

Canadian journalist, editor and news executive (born 1975/76)

- Born: 1975 or 1976 (age 49–50); Burlington, Ontario, Canada
- Occupations: Editor; Journalist; News executive
- Years active: 1990s–present
- Children: 2

Wendy Metcalfe (born 1975 or 1976) is a Canadian journalist, editor and news executive who served as the first female editor-in-chief of the Toronto Sun newspaper between 2013 and 2015, and of the Ottawa Sun newspaper from 2014 to 2015. Since August 2021, she has served as Hearst Connecticut Media Group's (HCMG) senior vice president of content and editor-in-chief. Metcalfe began her career as a volunteer sports anchor at a local cable television network before moving to the United Kingdom to begin her full-time media career at various newspapers. In 2011, she was appointed to work for Sun Media as regional managing editor for ten newspapers and was editor-in-chief of the St. Catharines Standard's newspaper and website.

== Biography ==
Metcalfe was born in either 1975 or 1976, and comes from Burlington, Ontario. She was an athlete at high school, attending The Ivey Academy. Metcalfe is a graduate of University of Western Ontario with a Bachelor of Arts degree and studied journalism at Humber College. She began her media career working as a volunteer sports anchor at a local cable television network after her suggestion of better coverage of local women's sports teams to broaden their output was taken on board.

She began her full-time media career at the Lincolnshire Echo newspaper in the United Kingdom as a features writer in November 1998; Metcalfe moved to the UK and remained there for 13 years since her husband was a serving Royal Air Force officer. She later became the newspaper's senior news reporter, assistant news editor and deputy news editor. Metcalfe went on to work at the newsdesk as the assistant news editor of the Scottish national newspaper Daily Record newspaper for four years from October 2002 to July 2006. She then became assistant editor of the Evening Express newspaper in Aberdeen, a role she held from August 2006 to September 2007. She was later appointed editor-in-chief of the Greenock Telegraph and Inverclyde Extra daily newspapers and held both jobs between March 2008 and April 2011.

In May 2011, she returned to Canada to work for Sun Media as regional managing editor for ten newspapers (three dailies and seven weekly papers) in Canada's Niagara and Southern Ontario regions. Metcalfe was appointed managing director later editor-in-chief of the St. Catharines Standard newspaper and website. She oversaw the redesign of the newspaper's and website's redesigns, which saw an increased readership. On July 29, 2013, Metcalfe was appointed editor-in-chief of the Toronto Sun newspaper, succeeding the resigned James Wallace. She became the publication's first female editor-in-chief. Metcalfe was also made Sun Media's regional content director. She was appointed editor-in-chief of the Ottawa Sun newspaper in October 2014, replacing Don Ermen. In May 2015, she left both the Toronto Sun and the Ottawa Sun. Metcalfe joined the Toronto Star two months later; she became its national editor and was later made its assistant managing editor. She remained at the newspaper until September 2016.

She worked at the privately owned Brunswick News company as the overseer of its circulation, customer service, marketing and news departments from November 2016 to October 2019. Metcalfe was a Master of Ceremony of the 2017 Atlantic Journalism Awards held at Halifax Harbourfront Marriott Hotel on April 28, 2018. In October 2019, she was named the new vice president of content and editor-in-chief of Hearst Connecticut Media Group (HCMG), replacing Matt DeRienzo, and moved to Connecticut. Metcalfe oversees eight dailies as well as several community weeklies, websites, Connecticut Magazine and other specialty publications that are owned by HCMG She was promoted to senior vice president of content in August 2021.

In September 2013, Metcalfe was named as one of "10 Woman To Watch" by Editor & Publisher magazine. Hartford Business Journal named her to its "2021 Power 50" list in February 2021.

== Personal life ==
She has two children with her husband.
