= The News-Times =

Daily newspaper based in Danbury, Connecticut, US

- Type: Daily newspaper
- Format: Broadsheet
- Owner(s): Hearst Communications
- Publisher: Mike DeLuca
- Founded: 1883
- Language: English
- Headquarters: 345 Main Street, Danbury, Connecticut 06810 USA
- Circulation: 20,473 Daily; 30,637 Sunday (as of 2007)
- Website: newstimes.com

Logo of the website

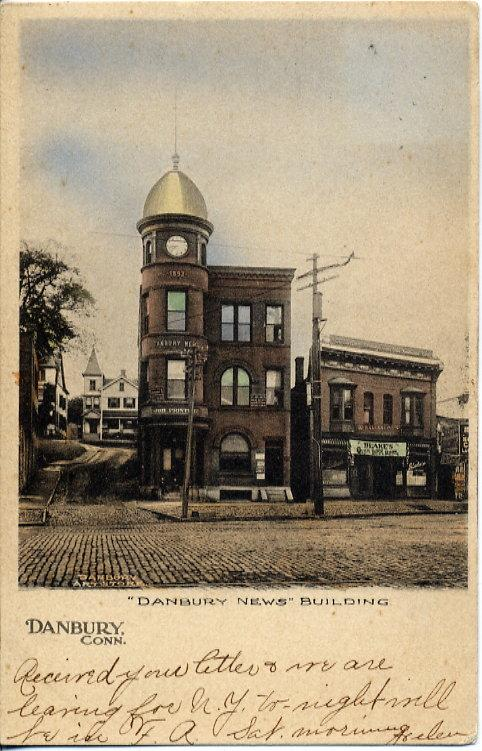
The Danbury News Building as depicted in a postcard circa 1906

The News-Times is a daily newspaper based in Danbury, Connecticut, United States. It is owned and operated by the Hearst Corporation.

The paper covers Danbury, a city in Fairfield County in southwestern Connecticut, as well as, portions of Litchfield County, including the towns of Brookfield, New Fairfield, Newtown, Bethel, Ridgefield, Redding, Roxbury, New Milford, Sherman, Kent, Bridgewater, Washington and Southbury.

The News-Times also owns and operates The Greater New Milford Spectrum, a weekly newspaper that covers New Milford, Sherman, Kent, Washington, Bridgewater, and Roxbury.

== News coverage ==
When it comes to covering different news stories, The News-Times reports on stories at the local, state, and even national level. Most crime stories that are published by The News-Times are often about events that occurred in the greater Danbury area. Their crime stories range from break-ins to homicides.

The paper's local news coverage ranges from town politics, to infrastructure, to city traditions and events. The News-Times also reports on major stories that take place throughout the state of Connecticut, as well as stories of national interest that have Connecticut roots in them.

== History ==
The News-Times was founded on September 8, 1883 as the Danbury Evening News by James Montgomery Bailey. In 1933, it merged with the Danbury Times, which was founded on May 17, 1927, thereafter to be known as the Danbury News-Times. The Ottaway Community Newspapers chain purchased the paper in 1955. Ottaway, which later became a division of Dow Jones & Company, owned the newspaper until November 2006, when its sale to Community Newspaper Holdings was announced.

Five months later, on April 1, 2007, the newspaper, along with the weekly Spectrum, were sold for US$75 million to Hearst Corporation of New York. Hearst also owns the Connecticut Post in Bridgeport and the Brooks Community Newspapers chain of weeklies in the lower Fairfield County. The current average daily net press run is 7,511 copies as reported in The Publisher's statement on October 1, 2018.

Dean Singleton, chairman and chief executive officer of MediaNews, told News-Times employees that the paper would remain independent of the larger Connecticut Post, even though the Danbury paper’s publisher will report to the publisher of the Post. MediaNews announced that it will also buy the News-Times building at 333 Main Street, which had not been part of the sale to Community Newspaper Holdings.

On August 8, 2008, the Hearst Corporation acquired the Connecticut Post (Bridgeport, Conn.) and www.ctpost.com, including seven non-daily newspapers, from MediaNews Group, Inc. In addition, they assumed management control of three additional daily newspapers in Fairfield County, Conn., including The Advocate (Stamford), Greenwich Time (Greenwich), and The News-Times (Danbury). The management of these newspapers had been controlled by the Hearst by MediaNews under a management agreement that began in April 2007.

In 2018, The News-Times editorial office moved from 333 Main Street to 345 Main Street in Danbury.
