= Bridgeport Evening Farmer =

- Founded: 1866
- Ceased publication: 1926
- City: Bridgeport
- Country: United States

The Bridgeport Evening Farmer, also briefly known as the Daily Bridgeport Farmer and the Daily Republican Farmer, was a newspaper based out of Bridgeport, Connecticut from 1866 to 1926, when it merged with the Bridgeport Star to become the Times-Star.

== History ==
=== Predecessors ===
The Bridgeport Evening Farmer's earliest predecessor, the Danbury-based Farmers Journal, began publication in March 1790. The newspaper underwent a series of name changes in the following years, becoming the Farmers Chronicle in 1793, and the Republican Journal in 1796. The paper would revert to its original name in 1800, but would briefly become the Farmer's Journal and Columbian Ark for a few months in 1803.

In the early 1800s, Connecticut remained a strong Federalist stronghold, but under the leadership of editor Stiles Nicholas the newspaper was staunchly Democratic. The paper's editorial stance was supportive of Thomas Jefferson, Andrew Jackson, and other Democratic administrations. Nicholas was fined and jailed in 1807 when defending the editor of another pro-Democrat paper from accusations of libel. Nicholas would move the paper, now called the Republican Farmer, from Danbury to Bridgeport in 1810. Over the following decades, and communication technology and printing rapidly improved, the paper published longer issues.

In 1837, Stiles Nicholas' son, Roswell Nicholas, took over as the Republican Farmer's editor, and took over the paper's management three years later.

=== Antebellum period ===
Sometime in the mid-1850s, a man named William S. Pomeroy began a newspaper known as the Daily Farmer, partnering with a Yale-educated southerner named Nathan Stephen Morse. The Daily Farmer regularly published content highly critical of Abraham Lincoln, in defense of slavery, and, even during the Civil War, supportive of peace with the Confederacy. By early 1861, nearly every single issue published by the Farmer contained polemics in defense of state's rights and slavery. A Connecticut Post journalist in 2011 called the Farmer's writings of this time "often rambling", and noted that much of it "is too repugnant to repeat in the Post today". On August 24, 1861, just four months after the outbreak of the American Civil War, a pro-union mob led by discharged soldiers marched from a counter-protest at Monroe's Stepney Green down to Bridgeport, and attacked the Farmer’s offices, and Pomeroy and Morse both fled the scene. Another major newspaper in the city at the time, the Bridgeport Standard, wrote that "a perfect wreck was made of the entire establishment. The presses were battered, broken and rendered worthless". The Bridgeport Standard reported that the publisher of the Farmer and an editor narrowly escaped the mob by climbing onto a roof. Publication ceased for over three years following this, only resuming on September 23, 1864, as The Evening Farmer, which maintained a strong pro-slavery stance throughout the duration of the Civil War. After the Civil War, journalist James B. Gould and printer Henry B. Stiles took over the publication of the long-lived weekly Republican Farmer and the Daily Farmer, the latter of which was now called the Evening Farmer, and in 1866, was renamed to the Bridgeport Evening Farmer.

=== As the Bridgeport Evening Farmer ===
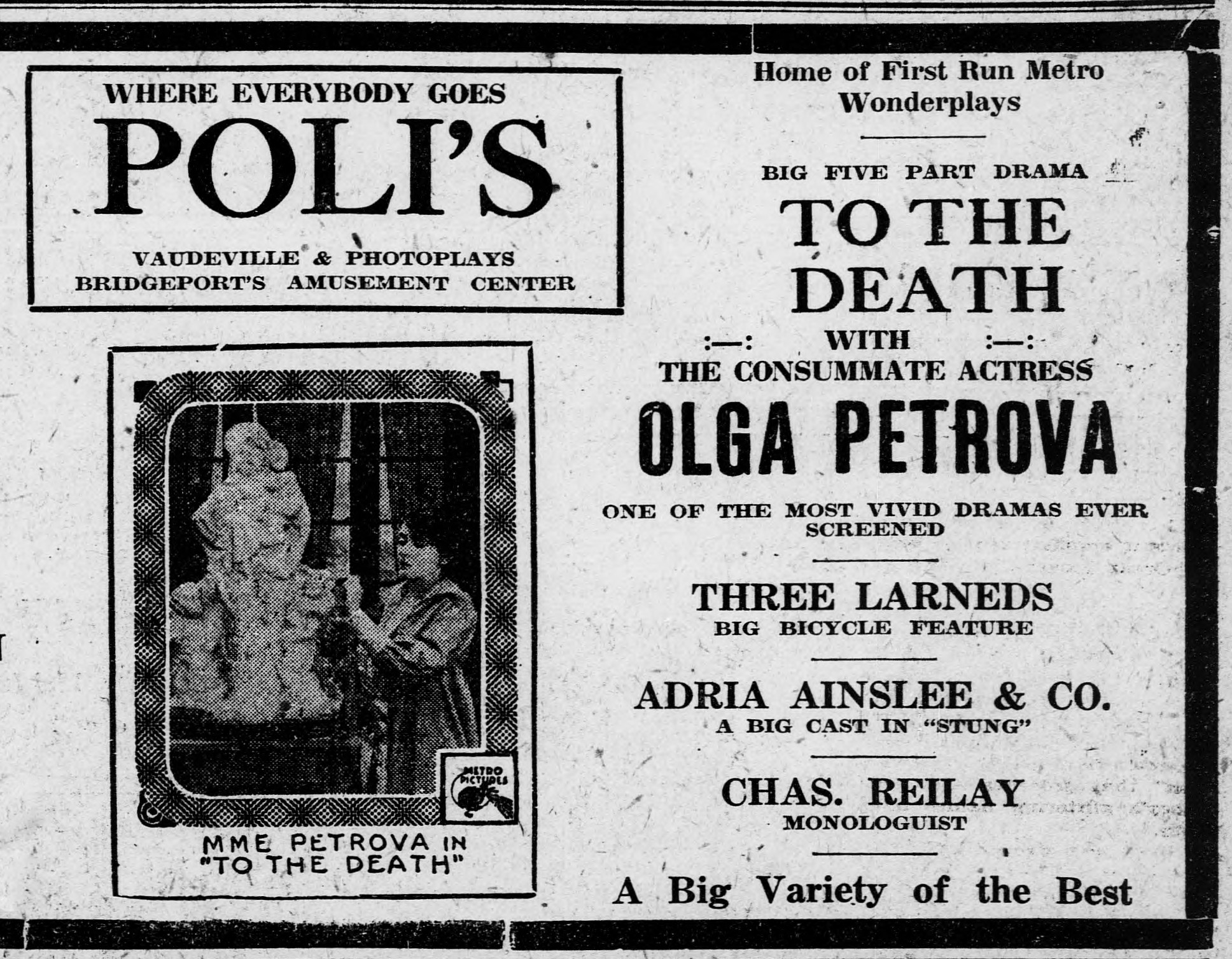
An advertisement for the silent film To The Death in the September 6, 1917, edition of the Bridgeport Evening Farmer

Stiles Nicholas' son-in-law Floyd Tucker took over the position as editor of the Bridgeport Evening Farmer, and continued the paper's militant Democratic alignment. Under Tucker's management, the paper engaged in acrimonious disputes with other papers, and actively supported Democratic candidates in the area. Bridgeport mayor Denis Mulvihill credited the paper with securing his re-election in 1903. The Bridgeport Evening Farmer also frequently supported the causes of organized labor, regularly calling for better wages and shorter working hours. In 1915, when workers went on strike in Bridgeport for an eight-hour work day, the paper publicly supported them. However, upon the United States' entry into World War I, the paper called upon the city's unions to limit strike actions.

From 1917 to 1926, the newspaper underwent a series of name changes, until it merged with the Bridgeport Star on November 1, 1926, to create the Bridgeport Times, the Bridgeport Star.

=== The Times-Star ===
Following the 1926 merger, James L. McGovern became the editor of the combined paper, which was renamed to the Times-Star. His editorial style was noted as a stark departure of Tucker's partisan management, and proclaimed that the Times-Star would be an "independent newspaper" which conformed to the "modern standards of journalism". This new style attracted a degree of success, and the Times-Star boasted circulation of 22,000 and a readership of 100,000 by November 1930, beating out the city's other large paper, the Bridgeport Post (now the Connecticut Post).

During the Great Depression, the newspaper experience financial hardship, and was unable to pay dividends to its shareholders. In 1941, the Bridgeport Post bought out the Bridgeport Times-Star for $200,000, and destroyed their equipment, ending daily newspaper competition in the city. The Times-Star published its last issue on November 25, 1941. The paper's name and publication rights were purchased by George C. Waldo of The Bridgeport Post-Telegram, who did not use them. The Times-Star employed 150 people at the time of its closure. Hours after the paper's closure on November 25, a fire of undetermined cause broke out at the paper's office building.

== Digitalization ==
Issues of the Bridgeport Evening Farmer have been digitalized by the Library of Congress and the Connecticut State Library.
