= Times Mirror Company =

American newspaper and print media publisher (1884-2000)

- Type: Public
- Traded as: NYSE: TMC
- Industry: Print media
- Founded: 1884; 142 years ago
- Defunct: 2000; 26 years ago
- Fate: Acquired by the Tribune Company
- Headquarters: Los Angeles, California, U.S.
- Products: newspapers, magazines, book publishers
- Revenue: $3.4 billion (1995)
- Divisions: Newspaper Publishing, Professional Information, Consumer Media

The Times Mirror Company was an American newspaper and print media publisher from 1884 until 2000.

== History ==
It had its roots in the Mirror Printing and Binding House, a commercial printing company founded in 1873, and the Los Angeles Times, originally the Los Angeles Daily Times, which was first published in 1881 and printed by the company. The two operations were purchased and combined in 1884 to form the Times Mirror Company.

In 1960, Times Mirror acquired the New American Library (NAL) and later sold it in 1983 to Odyssey Partners, a private investing group, and Ira J. Hechler, a private investor. Times Mirror acquired the World Publishing Company in 1962. By this time, World Publishing was producing 12 million books a year, one of only three American publishers to produce that much volume. In 1974, Times Mirror sold World Publishing to the U.K.-based Collins Publishers.

In 1967, the Times Mirror entered magazine publishing by acquiring Popular Science, Outdoor Life, Golf Magazine, and Ski Magazine. Times Mirror owned the Sporting News from 1977 until 2000, when it was sold to Paul Allen's Vulcan Inc. In 1987, Times Mirror acquired Field & Stream, Yachting, Home Mechanix, and Skiing.

In 1983, Times Mirror owned not only the Los Angeles Times but also Newsday, The Denver Post, The Dallas Times Herald, and the Hartford Courant. In 1986, Times Mirror bought A.S. Abell Company, owners of The Baltimore Sun, and as part of the sale, Gillett Communications bought out the broadcasting unit. That same year, Times Mirror acquired Broadcasting Publications Inc., parent company of broadcast trade magazine Broadcasting Magazine.

Times Mirror acquired Richard D. Irwin Inc. from Dow Jones & Company in 1988 to enter the textbook field. Times Mirror acquired Wm. C. Brown Co. in 1992. Times Mirror sold its textbook operations to McGraw-Hill in 1996.

Times Mirror also owned C.V. Mosby Company from 1967–1998, which published medical college textbooks and reference books; Harry N. Abrams — a publisher of art and photography books — from 1966–1997; legal publisher Matthew Bender (from 1963 until 1998); and air navigation publisher Jeppesen (from 1961 until Times Mirror was acquired by the Tribune Company). Subsequent acquisitions, like The Baltimore Sun in 1986, expanded the company's portfolio.

Times Mirror Co. was acquired by the Tribune Company in 2000. After the acquisition, Tribune sold Jeppesen to Boeing and the former Times Mirror magazines to Time Inc.

== Former newspapers ==
Name	City	Purchased	Sold	Fate
Los Angeles Times	Los Angeles, California	1884	2000	Acquired by Tribune Company
Newsday	Long Island–Westchester, New York	1970	2000	Acquired by Tribune Company
Dallas Times Herald	Dallas, Texas	1969	1986	Sold to MediaNews Group
The Advocate	Stamford, Connecticut	1977	2000	Acquired by Tribune Company
Greenwich Time	Greenwich, Connecticut	1977	2000	Acquired by Tribune Company
Hartford Courant	Hartford, Connecticut	1979	2000	Acquired by Tribune Company
The Denver Post	Denver, Colorado	1980	1987	Sold to MediaNews Group
The Morning Call	Allentown, Pennsylvania	1984	2000	Acquired by Tribune Company
The Baltimore Sun	Baltimore, Maryland	1986	2000	Acquired by Tribune Company

== Broadcasting ==
Times Mirror Broadcasting Company
- Type: Private
- Industry: Media
- Founded: 1946; as KTTV, Inc.
- Defunct: 1993 (inactive, 1963–1970)
- Fate: Acquired by Argyle Television (sold to New World Communications in 1994)
- Headquarters: Los Angeles, California, U.S.
- Areas served: United States
- Products: Broadcast and cable television

The Times-Mirror Company was a founding owner of television station KTTV in Los Angeles, which opened in January 1949. It became that station's sole owner in 1951, after re-acquiring the minority shares it had sold to CBS in 1948. Times-Mirror also purchased a former motion picture studio, Nassour Studios, in Hollywood in 1950, which was then used to consolidate KTTV's operations. Later to be known as Metromedia Square (then the Fox Television Center), the studio was sold along with KTTV to Metromedia in 1963.

After a seven-year hiatus from the medium, the firm reactivated Times-Mirror Broadcasting Company with its 1970 purchase of the Dallas Times Herald and its radio and television stations, KRLD-AM-FM-TV in Dallas. The Federal Communications Commission granted an exemption of its cross-ownership policy and allowed Times-Mirror to retain the newspaper and the television outlet, which was renamed KDFW-TV.

Times-Mirror Broadcasting later acquired KTBC-TV in Austin, Texas in 1973; and in 1980 purchased a group of stations owned by Newhouse Newspapers: WAPI-TV (now WVTM-TV) in Birmingham, Alabama; KTVI in St. Louis; WSYR-TV (now WSTM-TV) in Syracuse, New York and its satellite station WSYE-TV (now WETM-TV) in Elmira, New York; and WTPA-TV (now WHTM-TV) in Harrisburg, Pennsylvania. The company also entered the field of cable television, servicing the Phoenix and San Diego areas, amongst others. They were originally titled Times-Mirror Cable, and were later renamed to Dimension Cable Television. Similarly, they also attempted to enter the pay-TV market, with the Spotlight movie network; it wasn't successful and was quickly shut down. The cable systems were sold in the mid-1990s to Cox Communications.

Times-Mirror also pared its station group down, selling off the Syracuse, Elmira and Harrisburg properties in 1986, to Smith Broadcasting. Times-Mirror briefly held WMAR-TV in Baltimore and WRLH-TV in Richmond, which were acquired alongside the Baltimore Sun, but had to sell off those stations to Gillett Communications to appease FCC's cross-ownership rules. The remaining four outlets were packaged to a new upstart holding company, Argyle Television, in 1993. These stations were acquired by New World Communications shortly thereafter and became key components in a sweeping shift of network-station affiliations which occurred between 1994–1995.

=== Former stations ===
Stations owned by Times Mirror Company
Media market	State/Prov.	Station	Purchased	Sold	Notes
Birmingham	Alabama	WVTM-TV	1980	1993	
Los Angeles	California	KTTV	1949	1963	(Note: Co-owned with CBS until 1951 in a joint venture; 51 percent owned by Times-Mirror, 49 percent owned by CBS.)
Baltimore	Maryland	WMAR-TV	1986	1986	
St. Louis	Missouri	KTVI	1980	1993	
Elmira	New York	WETM-TV	1980	1986	
Syracuse	New York	WSTM-TV	1980	1986	
Harrisburg	Pennsylvania	WHTM-TV	1980	1986	
Austin	Texas	KTBC-TV	1973	1993	
Dallas–Fort Worth	Texas	KDFW-TV	1970	1993	(Note: Purchased along with KRLD-AM-FM as part of Times-Mirror's acquisition of the Dallas Times Herald. Times-Mirror sold the radio stations to comply with FCC cross-ownership restrictions.)
Richmond	Virginia	WRLH-TV	1986	1986	
