= Greenwich Time (newspaper) =

American daily newspaper

- Type: Daily newspaper
- Format: Broadsheet
- Owner: Hearst Corporation
- Publisher: Mike Deluca
- Founded: 1877, as Greenwich Observer
- Headquarters: 165 West Putnam Avenue, Greenwich, Connecticut United States
- Circulation: 7,838 daily 10,672 Sunday (as of 2010)
- Website: greenwichtime.com

Greenwich Time is a daily newspaper based in Greenwich, Connecticut, United States. The paper shares an editor and publisher with The Advocate of nearby Stamford, Connecticut. Both papers are owned and operated by the Hearst Corporation.

== History ==
In 1977, Southern Connecticut Newspapers, which owned the Greenwich Time and the Stamford Advocate, was acquired by Times Mirror. Times Mirror was acquired by Tribune in 2000.

In March 2007, Tribune announced it would sell the two papers to Gannett for US$73 million, but the deal fell through when Gannett refused to honor 35 Advocate newsroom workers' union contract with Local 2110 of United Auto Workers.

The Time and its sister paper, The Advocate, were sold to Hearst for US$62.4 million by Tribune Company in a deal that closed November 1, 2007. The sale did not include Tribune-owned land in Stamford and Greenwich, including the papers' printing presses. Hearst prints both The Advocate and the Time at the Connecticut Post plant in Bridgeport.

Following the Tribune sale, the Post was owned by MediaNews, which managed The Advocate and Greenwich Time for Hearst until Hearst bought out MediaNews in 2008.

On August 8, 2008 the Hearst Corporation acquired the Connecticut Post (Bridgeport, Conn.) and www.ConnPost.com, including seven non-daily newspapers, from MediaNews Group, Inc. and assumed management control of three additional daily newspapers in Fairfield County, Conn., including The Advocate (Stamford), Greenwich Time (Greenwich), and The News-Times (Danbury), which had been managed for Hearst by MediaNews under a management agreement that began in April 2007.
