= Fairfield Minuteman =

The Fairfield Minuteman was a local newspaper of Fairfield, Connecticut. Combined with the Westport Minuteman, both of which were owned by the Journal Register Company, the Minuteman had a combined readership of roughly 30,000. In 2017, Hearst purchased the Minuteman from JRC successor Digital First Media. The Westport Minuteman was merged into the Fairfield Minuteman, then the combined paper was closed later in 2017.
