= Hopedale strike =

1913 American loom manufacturer strike

The Hopedale strike was a labour dispute at the American loom manufacturer Draper Company in Hopedale, Massachusetts. It began in April 1913 and disintegrated after three months. The strike came amid a wave of regional strikes that year, as Draper's 2,000 employees walked out on April 1 for a nine-hour day, a 22-cent minimum hourly wage, and the end of piecework. After Draper's director, the former Massachusetts governor Eben Draper rejected their demands. The workers voted to continue their strike indefinitely, supported by the Industrial Workers of the World's Joseph Coldwell.
