= The Saratogian =

Newspaper in Saratoga Springs, New York

- Type: Daily newspaper
- Format: Broadsheet
- Owner(s): 21st Century Media (1998-current), Gannett (1934-1998)
- Founded: 1855
- Headquarters: 20 Lake Avenue; Saratoga Springs, New York 12866; United States
- Circulation: 7,367 Daily (as of 2017)
- ISSN: 1071-4448
- Website: saratogian.com

The Saratogian is a broadsheet-style daily newspaper published in Saratoga Springs, New York, United States. The paper has been published daily since 1855, first as The Daily Saratogian, and then as The Saratogian beginning in 1910.

It covers all of Saratoga County, New York and specifically the city of Saratoga Springs. It includes the Pinksheet in the summer, which has information about what will happen at the Saratoga Race Course that very day.

The Saratogian was owned by Gannett from 1934 to 1998, when it was sold to the Journal Register Company, now known as 21st Century Media, a subsidiary of Digital First Media. Digital is controlled by Alden Global Capital which has a practice of reducing staff and draining resources from local papers.
