= Record-Journal =

Daily newspaper in Meriden, Connecticut, United States

- 140 Years of Record-Journal
- Type: Daily newspaper
- Format: Broadsheet
- Owner(s): Hearst Communications
- Publisher: Eliot C. White
- Founded: 1867, as The Weekly Visitor
- Headquarters: 500 South Broad Street; Meriden, Connecticut 06450; United States
- Circulation: 14,961 daily 15,979 Sunday (as of November 2013)
- OCLC number: 1333824778
- Website: www.ctinsider.com/recordjournal/

The Record-Journal is an American daily newspaper based in Meriden, Connecticut, that dates back to the years immediately following the American Civil War. It was owned by the Record-Journal Publishing Company, a family-owned business entity, until it was sold to Hearst Communications Connecticut Media Group in November 2023.

== History ==
The Record-Journal dates back to a weekly newspaper called the Weekly Visitor established in 1867. In 1892, E.E. Smith and Thomas Warnock bought it and converted it to a daily. Co-founder Thomas Warnock was editor of the paper for almost half a century. E.E. Smith was the first of four generations to lead the Record-Journal as publisher. E.E. Smith was followed by his son, Wayne C. Smith, who served as publisher until his death in 1966. In 1977, The Morning Record and the Meriden Journal merged and became the Record-Journal. Carter White took over for his stepfather and was publisher until his retirement in 1988. Carter's son Eliot C. White was the Record-Journal president, and Elizabeth White, a member of the family's fifth generation, was Publisher and Executive Vice President until the sale to Hearst Connecticut Media.

In November 2023, the White family sold the Record-Journal, along with seven weekly newspapers and its digital advertising agency, to Hearst Communications. The deal included The Cheshire Citizen, The Southington-Plainville Citizen, The Town Times, The Berlin Citizen, The North Haven Citizen and The Cheshire Herald. After the sale was finalized, Hearst offered full-time positions to about half of RJ Media Group’s staff.

== Expansion ==
During the first decade of the 21st century, the Record-Journal company doubled in size with seven acquisitions and seventeen start-ups, expanding into new markets and adding 100 people to its Rhode Island and Florida operations. By the middle of the decade, the Record-Journal's daily publication comprised 45 percent of total business of the company. The year 2006 marked the company's 140th birthday, and found itself shifting again, this time embracing its online presence as Elizabeth White became new media director and led the launch of Myrecordjournal.com, the Record-Journal's community news and advertising web site. The number of site visits subsequently became over 700,000 per month.

The daily paper's circulation was 16,711 daily, 17,896 Sundays in 2011.

In 2013–2014, circulation was 14,662 daily (last quarter, 2014) and 17,065 Sundays (2013).

In October 2015, the Record-Journal Publishing Co. moved from 11 Crown St. to a new headquarters at 500 S. Broad St. in Meriden. As part of the move, the company rebranded as RJ Media Group.

In August 2018, the Record-Journal Publishing Co. sold Westerly, Rhode Island's The Westerly Sun, to the publishing group Rhode Island Suburban Newspapers.

== See also ==
- The Middletown Press, 1878-founded newspaper in nearby Middletown
