= ReminderNews =

Chain of newspapers in Connecticut, US

- Type: Weekly newspaper
- Format: Compact
- Owner(s): Tribune Company
- Founder(s): Kenneth Hovland
- Editor: Joan Hunt
- Founded: 1949
- Ceased publication: 2024
- Headquarters: 120 Old Town Rd., Vernon, Connecticut 06066
- Circulation: 200,000
- OCLC number: 29583777
- Website: remindernews.com

ReminderNews was a chain of 15 weekly newspapers circulating throughout the eastern portion of Connecticut. The first edition was published in 1949, with additional titles added over the years. The newspaper chain were sold to the Hartford Courant in 2014, and a year later renamed to Courant Community newspapers. The newspapers ceased publication in January 2024.

== History ==
Kenneth Hovland and his new bride Carol moved from Iowa to the Rockville section of Vernon, Connecticut in 1948. A year later they started a weekly paper that would become ReminderNews.

The paper's first edition was printed on Nov. 21, 1949, on a hand-cranked press in the kitchen of the couple's third-floor apartment. Hovland's old manual typewriter is on display at the Vernon Historical Society.

Over the years, the company grew to include the communities of Colchester, East Hartford, Enfield, Glastonbury, Hebron/Columbia, Jewett City, Killingly/Plainfield, Manchester, Putnam, South Windsor, Stafford, Vernon, Windham/Mansfield, Windsor and Windsor Locks.

Carol Hovland died in May 2010 and Kenneth Hovland died in October 2011. Three years later ReminderMedia was sold in May 2014 by owner Ken Hovland Jr. to the Hartford Courant. The sale included all 15 weekly newspapers; four annual community directories titled Reminder Gold Pages; Reminder Homes, a monthly publication on properties for sale; and the weekly Reminder AutoMarket.

The Reminder name remained on the mastheads of all newspaper editions until November 2015, when the papers were redesigned and renamed Courant Community.

In January 2024, it was announced Courant Community newspapers was to cease publication on Jan. 18.

== Content ==
The 15 local editions of the paper are filled primarily with photos, feature articles, human interest, sports, politics and education and business news. There was also a section, as in many other periodicals, known as "Speak Out", in which reader editorials dealing with local and national issues are published. The newspaper also included "Teen Speak Out", which features local teens' perspectives.
