= Black Rock Beacon (Bridgeport) =

The Black Rock Beacon
- Founder(s): Laszlo Renner and Alex Vago
- Ceased publication: December 11, 1931
- Language: English
- City: Bridgeport, Connecticut
- Country: United States

The Black Rock Beacon was a weekly newspaper published in Bridgeport, Connecticut until December 11, 1931. Created and published by Lasso Tenner and Alex Sago, it was succeeded by The Beacon (1931–1942)..
