= Stamford Advocate =

Daily newspaper based in Connecticut

The Advocate

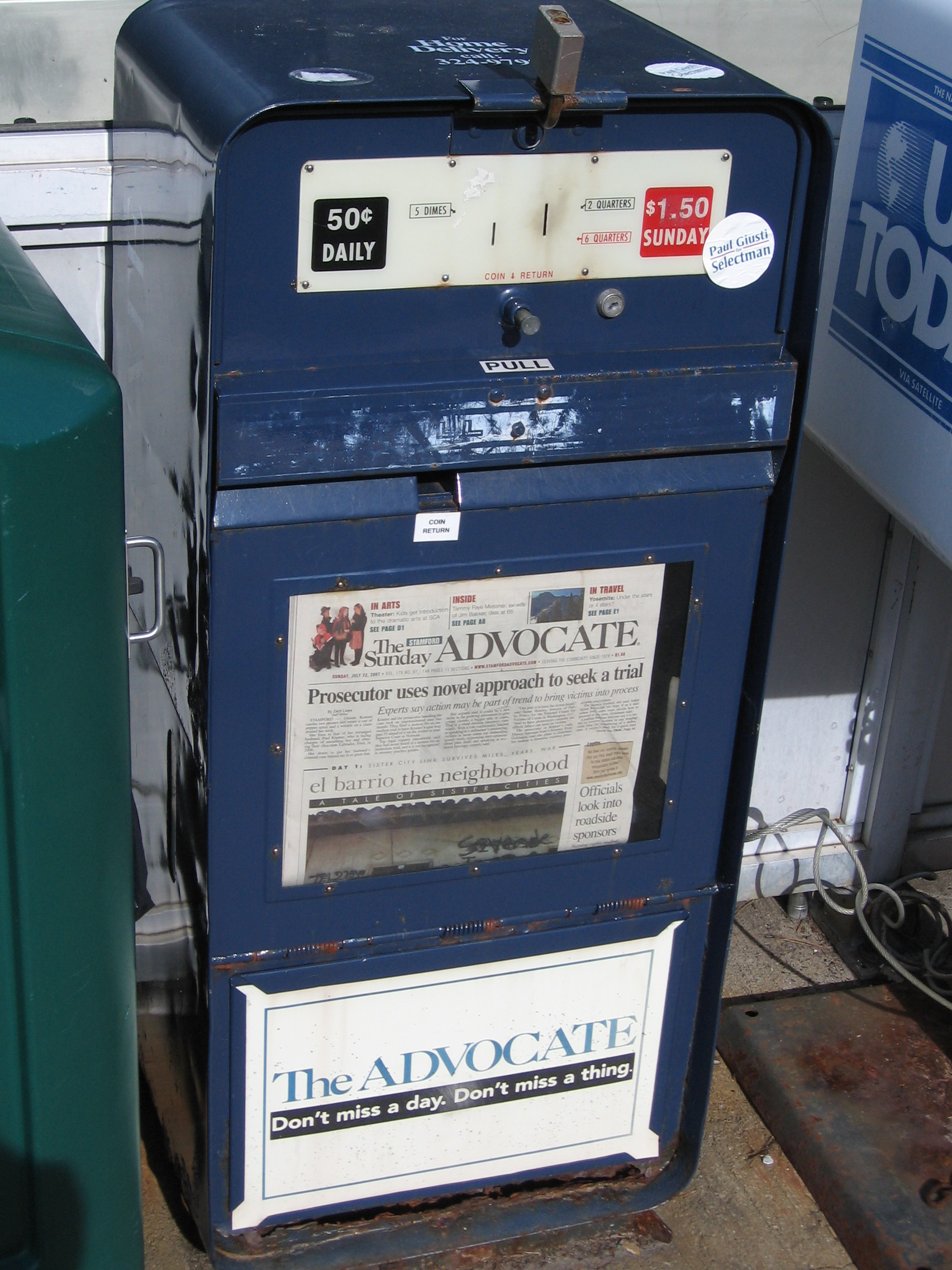
- The Advocate newspaper "honor box" in New Canaan, Connecticut
- Type: Daily newspaper
- Format: Broadsheet
- Owner: Hearst Communications
- Publisher: Mike Deluca
- Editor: Claire Racine
- Founded: 1829, as The Stamford Intelligencer
- Headquarters: 1055 Washington Boulevard, Stamford, Connecticut, U.S.
- Circulation: 14,700 daily, 24,900 Sunday in 2010
- Website: stamfordadvocate.com

The Advocate is a seven-day daily newspaper based in Stamford, Connecticut. The paper is owned and operated by Hearst Communications.

The Advocate circulates in Stamford and the nearby southwestern Connecticut towns of Darien and New Canaan. The paper's headquarters moved in 2008 from downtown Stamford, across the street from the Stamford Government Center, to the Riverbend complex in the Springdale section of Stamford.

== Coverage ==
In addition to the regular focus on local news, sports and business, The Advocate pays special attention to the workings of Metro-North Railroad, since many in southwestern Connecticut commute by train.

The Advocate's website was launched in 1999. In early 2007, the site started featuring message boards.

== History ==
The Advocate has been called Stamford's oldest continuing business.

=== The Intelligencer ===
The paper's earliest origins come from The Intelligencer, a newspaper originally run out of a small office on the south side of West Park (now Columbus Park in downtown Stamford) in April 1829. William Henry "Hen" Holly installed a printing press there, but despite some support from the community, he closed the publication after a few months for lack of revenue.

Several town leaders then helped to finance the publication again, this time under the name The Sentinel, which first appeared on February 16, 1830. Stamford was never without a local newspaper of one kind or another since then. The oldest known copy of The Sentinel, dated June 22, 1830, is in Stamford's public library, the Ferguson Library. That issue, marked Volume 1, No. 19, consists of four sheets, 15 by 20 inches each, with six columns to a page. The motto of the newspaper, printed at the top of the front page, was: "Pledged to no party's arbitrary way, we follow Truth wher'er she leads the way."

The newspaper published very little local news, according to Don Russell, an Advocate columnist who wrote about the early history of the paper. "[T]he columns were filled with sermons, poems and what were called literary 'gems' from various sources, and some domestic and foreign news items taken from newspapers in big cities."

An early columnist in the newspaper wrote under the pseudonym "Aristides the Younger" and at one point denounced the Rev. Joel Mann of Greenwich for anti-Masonic tendencies. Some think the columnist was Holly.

Holly promoted reading in Stamford in various ways, operating his own circulating library out of his office, with books available to borrowers he deemed responsible. He was also one of the major founders of Stamford's public library, the Ferguson.

=== Family ownership ===
In May 1848, Edgar Hoyt and Andrew Smith came into ownership of the newspaper. The partners renamed it The Stamford Advocate. Advertising was banished from the front page.

In 1861 printer William Gillespie and his brother, Edward, joined the newspaper staff. Edward would later cover the Civil War from the front lines. Eventually the Gillespie brothers, sons of a Canadian immigrant to Stamford, bought the newspaper and became the first of three generations of Gillespie owners of the publication.

In 1892 they made the newspaper a daily. Around the turn of the century the name changed to The Daily Advocate. The name was later changed to The Stamford Advocate.

=== Atlantic Street offices ===
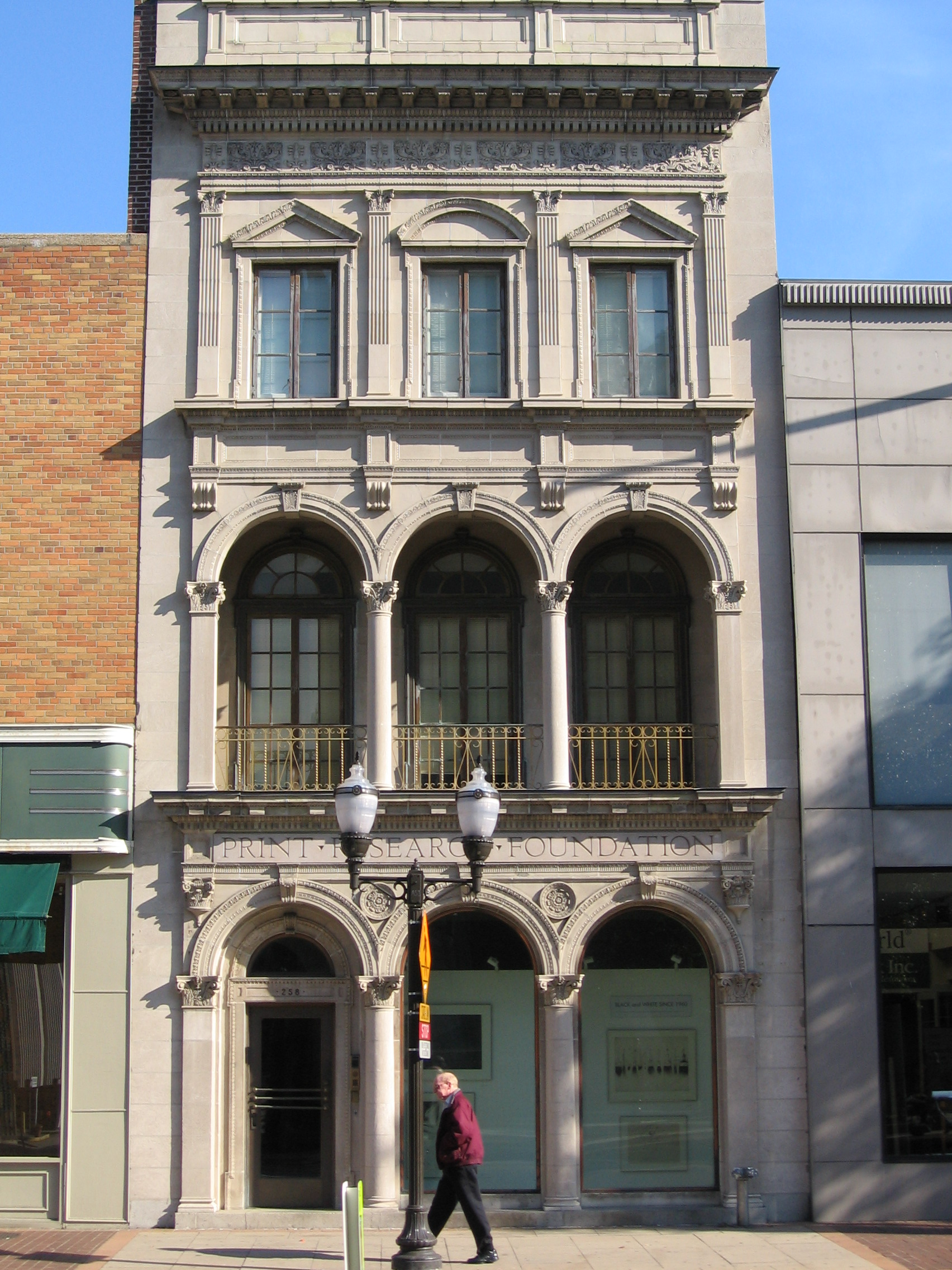
Former Advocate building (1894-1980)

In 1894, the Advocate moved into a new building at 258 Atlantic Street (across the street from St. John Roman Catholic Church). The facade is in Neo-Italian Renaissance style, and its relatively narrow front widens out considerably in the back, where the newspaper's printing press was located. In 1928 the building was remodeled, and the newspaper remained in that location until 1980. (The building was then occupied by various architectural and design firms and an Internet company. In 2002 it became the home of the Print Research Foundation.)

In the late 1940s, the 1947 film Boomerang, directed by Elia Kazan was shot almost entirely in Stamford, and partly at the newspaper's offices, then on Atlantic Street. Some members of the editorial staff were shown in the movie.

=== Times-Mirror and Tribune ===
In 1977, the Gillespie family sold the paper to Times Mirror Company, owner of The Los Angeles Times.

In 1978, Anthony Dolan, a staff writer at the time, won a Pulitzer Prize for reporting on city corruption. While in college, he had written for the Yale Daily News, and interviewed Stamford resident and Yale alumnus William F. Buckley Jr. for that student newspaper. The two became friends, and when Dolan lost his job with Gannett, Buckley helped get him hired by The Advocate. By 1979, Dolan had become tired of journalism and in 1980 went to work for Ronald Reagan's campaign for president. Dolan went on to become a speechwriter in Reagan's White House.

In 1980, the newspaper moved to a new building at the corner of Tresser and Washington Boulevards in downtown Stamford. The building was constructed by Frank Mercede & Sons Inc. under a contract signed by the Advocate's then-publisher Jay Shaw.

In June 2000, Tribune Company bought Times Mirror, incorporating The Advocate into the Chicago-based company's holdings. The property at Tresser Boulevard was subsequently sold.

In May 2003 The Advocate opened an office at 605 West Avenue in Norwalk. The newspaper had started printing separate Norwalk editions in the 1980s, but reporters had worked in the Stamford offices.

=== Sale to Hearst ===
In March 2007, Tribune Co. had announced it would sell the two papers to Gannett for US$73 million, but the deal fell through when Gannett refused to honor 35 Advocate newsroom workers' union contract with Local 2110 of United Auto Workers.

The Advocate and its sister paper, the Greenwich Time, were sold to Hearst for US$62.4 million by Tribune Company in a deal that closed November 1, 2007. The sale did not include Tribune-owned land in Stamford and Greenwich, including the papers' printing presses. At the end of 2007, printing plant employees were permanently laid off and the newspaper was printed at the Danbury News-Times plant, owned by MediaNews Group. The Greenwich Time was then printed at the Connecticut Post plant in Bridgeport.

On January 6, 2008, the newspaper announced in a front-page article that its Stamford offices were moving from 75 Tresser Boulevard, where the newspaper had been located since 1981, to the Riverbend office complex off Hope Street in the city's Springdale section, with the move expected by the end of the month. The Norwalk office was moving from leased office space at 605 West Avenue, where it had been since the Norwalk edition began, to 542 Westport Avenue, effective immediately.

On August 8, 2008 the Hearst Corporation acquired the Connecticut Post (Bridgeport, Conn.) and www.ConnPost.com, including seven non-daily newspapers, from MediaNews Group, Inc. and assumed management control of three additional daily newspapers in Fairfield County, Conn., including The Advocate (Stamford), Greenwich Time (Greenwich), and The News-Times (Danbury), which had been managed for Hearst by MediaNews had managed under a management agreement that began in April 2007.

In 2018, The Advocate left its offices on Spring Street and returned downtown, setting up operations on the first floor of 1055 Washington Boulevard.

== Advocate name ==
Founded in 1829 as The Stamford Intelligencer, the newspaper was renamed several times in the 1830s and 1840s before becoming The Stamford Advocate in 1843.

The Advocate has been known by various names:

- Stamford Intelligencer April 8, 1829, when the newspaper had a brief run as a weekly, to February __, 1830
- Stamford Sentinel February 15, 1830, when the newspaper was restarted, to August 17, 1835 and again from October 5, 1835 to March 13, 1837
- Democratic Sentinel — March 19, 1838 to July __, 1840
- Farmer's Advocate
- The Farmer and Mechanic's Advocate, (the comma was part of the title) — June 15, 1842 to some date in 1843
- Daily Advocate starting at some date in 1843 and until March 30, 1922
- The Advocate in 1974.

== Locations of historical archives ==
Depositories:

Microfilm:

- Connecticut State Library:
  - April 8, 1829 to August 18, 1904 (Under other titles)
  - April 5, 1892 to December 1955
  - January 1967 to December 1971
  - January 1975 to present (as of 1985)
- Ferguson Library in Stamford:
  - April 5, 1892 to present
- New Canaan High School: 1829-1880

Originals:

- Connecticut State Library:
  - 1853-1867
  - 1880
  - 1890
  - 1892-1895
- Ferguson Library in Stamford: 1829-1904
