= Connecticut Post =

Newspaper in Bridgeport, Connecticut

- The December 22, 2006 front page of the Connecticut Post
- Type: Daily newspaper
- Format: Broadsheet
- Owner: Hearst Communications
- Publisher: Mike Deluca
- Editor: Donald Eng
- Founded: 1883
- Language: English
- Headquarters: 1057 Broad Street Bridgeport, CT 06604
- Circulation: 30,700 Average print circulation
- Sister newspapers: Bridgeport Telegram; Bridgeport Evening Post
- Website: ctpost.com

The Connecticut Post is a daily newspaper located in Bridgeport, Connecticut. It serves Fairfield County and the Lower Naugatuck Valley. Municipalities in the Post's circulation area include Ansonia, Bridgeport, Darien, Derby, Easton, Fairfield, Milford, Monroe, New Canaan, Orange, Oxford, Redding, Ridgefield, Seymour, Shelton, Stratford, Trumbull, Weston, Westport and Wilton. The newspaper is owned and operated by the Hearst Corporation, a multinational corporate media conglomerate with $4 billion in revenues. The Connecticut Post also gains revenue by offering classified advertising for job hunters with minimal regulations and separate listings for products and services.

== The Post ==
It is southwestern Connecticut's largest circulation daily newspaper. The paper competes directly with the Register in Stratford, Milford, and portions of the Lower Naugatuck Valley. Since June 2017, the Post and the Register have been under common ownership, with management led first by Hearst Connecticut Media Group president Paul Barbetta and since May 2019 by his successor Mike Deluca.

The publisher is Mike Deluca who is also the president of Hearst Connecticut Media Group. Recent editor James H. Smith departed abruptly on June 26, 2008. No reason was given to staff, but Smith later attributed his departure to "mutual agreement". Smith had attempted to take the newspaper in a different direction, stressing slice-of-life style features and enterprise and investigative work while playing down court/police coverage. He avoided layoffs despite economic pressures, opting instead to offer buyouts and drastically cut the freelance budget. In October 2019 Wendy Metcalfe was named editor-in-chief of Hearst Connecticut Media on the abrupt ouster of Matt Derienzo.

The Post employs seven editors within their departments including a digital news editor, sports editor, arts & entertainment editor, business editor, features editor, editorial page editor and photo editor. These editors work along with the managing editor and two assistant managing editors to build the newspaper daily.

The Post's coverage area presents problems as Bridgeport, Connecticut's largest city, is a poor and mostly minority area, while the surrounding eastern Fairfield County and western New Haven County area is affluent and mostly white. Consequently, while the Post does provide solid coverage of Bridgeport, most of the paper is composed of local stories regarding the surrounding towns.

== History ==
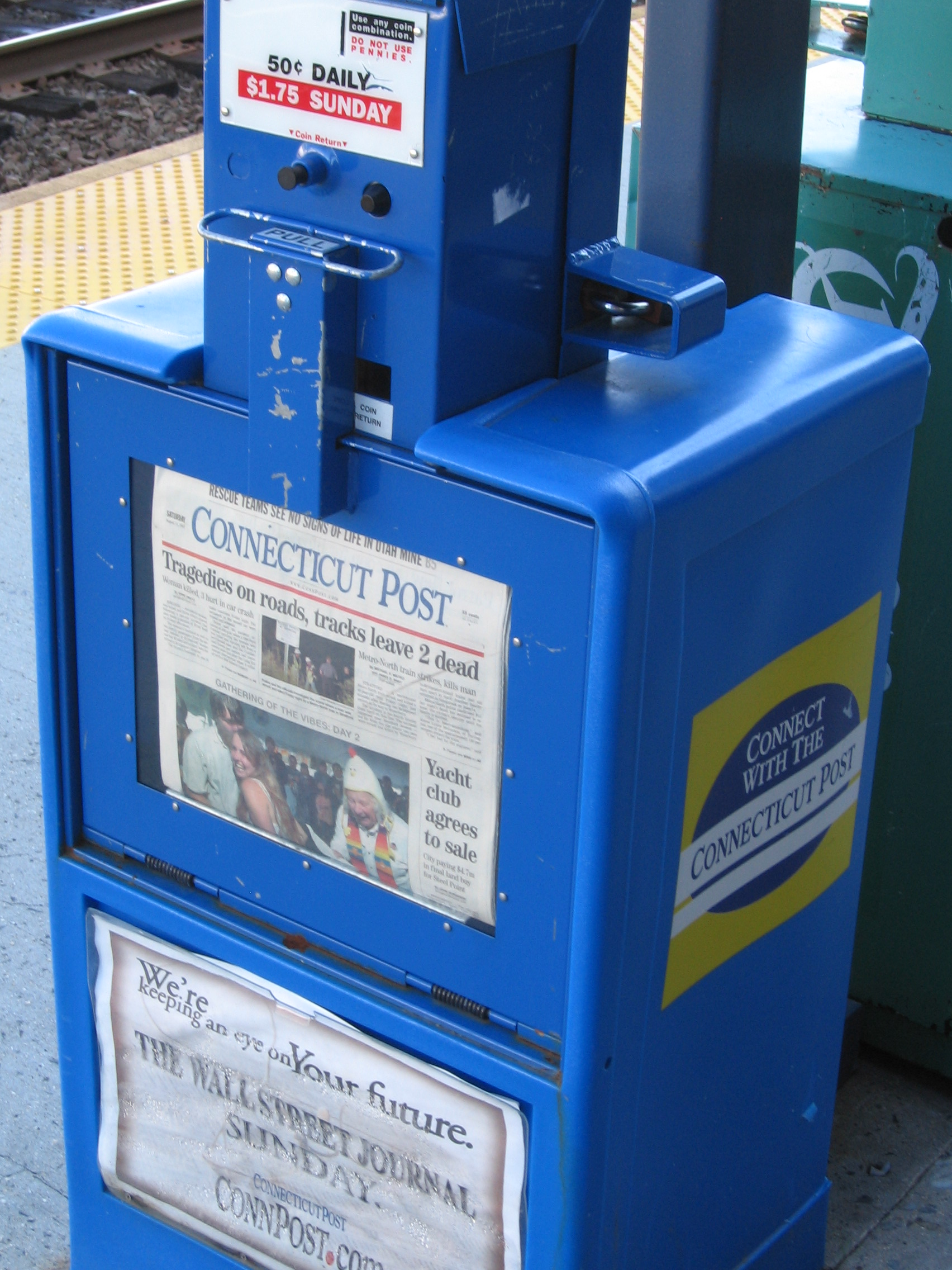
Vending box

=== Founding and early days ===
The newspaper's roots trace back to 1883, with the founding of the Daily Post, located in East Bridgeport. Months after it was founded, the Daily Post was renamed to the Daily Evening Post, which was renamed to The Evening Post just years later. In 1885, the paper launched a morning edition, titled The Bridgeport Morning Telegram, which published every day, except Sundays. In 1893, The Evening Post was renamed to the Bridgeport Evening Post. Sometime during the early or mid 1890s, The Bridgeport Morning Telegram was renamed to simply The Morning Telegram.

By the late 1890s, the paper became one of the city's most popular papers. During this time, its editorial stance was not closely aligned to either major political party.

=== 20th century ===
The paper's morning edition, The Morning Telegram, was renamed in 1901 to the Morning Telegram-Union, reflecting its absorption of The Morning Union, another popular paper in the city which had been publishing since 1891.

In 1906, the paper's evening edition, the Bridgeport Evening Post was renamed to The Bridgeport Post, a name which would be retained until 1992. That same year, the paper's morning edition, the Morning Telegram-Union, briefly reverted its name back to The Morning Telegram, which was then renamed to the Bridgeport Morning Telegram just months later. The Bridgeport Morning Telegram would subsequently be renamed to The Bridgeport Telegram in 1908, a name that stuck around until 1977.

In December 1918, the paper was acquired by Edward Flicker and Russell R. Whitman from its previous owners, Archibald McNeil Jr. and Kenneth W. McNeil. Flicker was previously the publisher of The Cincinnati Enquirer, and Whitman was the publisher of The New York Commercial.

Beginning in 1928, the paper was located at 410 State Street.

In 1977, The Bridgeport Telegram was renamed to simply The Telegram.

In 1981, a Post wire service editor died at his desk after his head fell into a glue pot, leaving him stuck. This occurred while a Girl Scout troop was touring the newsroom.

In 1986, a young staffer at the Post office dropped his coat with a handgun in it, and accidentally shot a bullet into the ceiling. The man had become a drug dealer on the side and was arrested in the lobby for selling cocaine by an undercover police officer working as a janitor at the building.

In 1988, the paper's morning edition, The Telegram, was renamed to the Bridgeport Telegram. The morning edition continued to run under this title until 1990, when its brand was rolled up into The Bridgeport Post.

In 1992, The Bridgeport Post was renamed to the Connecticut Post, its current name.

=== 21st century ===
In 2017, the Post's offices moved from 410 State Street to 1057 Broad Street The Post had been operating at the State Street location since 1928. The change in office space was made after deciding to downsize after most of the staff had moved to Hearst Connecticut Media's headquarters in Norwalk, CT. Only 20 employees made up of local reporters, editors and photographers work at the new location.

The Post was formerly owned by Thomson Corporation, a national newspaper chain. In 2000, Thomson agreed to sell the Post for $205 million to MediaNews Group, based in Denver, Colorado, which also owned newspapers in Massachusetts and New Hampshire.

On August 8, 2008, the Hearst Corporation acquired the Connecticut Post (Bridgeport) and www.ConnPost.com, including seven non-daily newspapers, from MediaNews Group, Inc., and assumed management control of three additional daily newspapers in Fairfield County, including The Advocate (Stamford), Greenwich Time (Greenwich), and The News-Times (Danbury), which had been managed for Hearst by MediaNews under a management agreement that began in April 2007. Overall, the company publishes 24 dailies and 56 weeklies across the country.

The Hearst Corporation also has ownership in global financial services, cable channels A&E, History, Lifetime and ESPN, television stations, including WCVB-TV in Boston, and over 300 magazines.

In 2010, the Connecticut Post launched a complete re-design which included a new font and re-designed Connecticut Post header.

In 2008, under Smith's leadership, the Connecticut Post received its first Newspaper of the Year Award from the New England Newspaper Association.
