= List of first African-American U.S. state legislators =

African Americans have served in state legislatures, with several interruptions, since Alexander Twilight was elected to the Vermont lower house in 1836. Representation increased during the Reconstruction era, plummeted during the ensuing decades, and rose again during the 1950s and 1960s with the civil rights movement. The last state to elect its first African-American state legislator was North Dakota in 2022.

== Nationwide ==
Legislator	Image	Legislative achievement	Seat held	Took office	Left office	Party	Ref
Mathias de Sousa		1^{st} African-American man elected to any state legislature	General Assembly Upper House	1641	?	N/A	
John R. Lynch		1^{st} African-American man to serve as speaker of any state lower house	Mississippi's 6th District (Created by State Legislature)	1873	1883	Republican	
Minnie Buckingham Harper		1^{st} African-American woman to serve in any state legislature	Rep. from Keystone, West Virginia	1928	1930		
Crystal Bird Fauset		1^{st} African-American woman elected to any state legislature	18th State House District of Pennsylvania	1938	1940	Democratic	
Cora Brown		1^{st} African-American woman elected (rather than appointed to a state senate	Michigan State Senate from 2nd & 3rd District	1953	1956	Democratic	
William Owen Bush		1^{st} African-American man elected to any state Legislature on the West Coast	First sitting of the Washington House of Representatives	1889	1895	Republican	
Karen Bass		1^{st} African-American woman to serve as speaker of any state lower house	California State Assembly from the 47th District	2004	2010	Democratic	
Andrea Stewart-Cousins		1^{st} African-American woman to serve as speaker of any state upper house	New York Senate from the 35th District	2007	2019–Present		
Peter Groff		1^{st} bicameral state legislature to have both chambers headed simultaneously by African Americans	Colorado Senate from the 33rd District	2003	2009	Democratic	
Terrance Carroll		1^{st} bicameral state legislature to have both chambers headed simultaneously by African Americans	Colorado Speaker of the House, 7th District	2009/2003	2011		

== Alabama ==
Legislator	Legislative Achievement	Seat Held	Took office	Left Office	Party	Ref
Benjamin F. Royal	1^{st} African-American man elected to the Alabama Senate		1868			
Sundra Escott-Russell	1^{st} African-American woman elected to the Alabama Senate		1990			
Jeremiah Haralson	1^{st} African-American man elected to the Alabama House of Representatives		1870			
Louphenia Thomas	1^{st} African-American woman elected to the Alabama House of Representatives		1977			

== Alaska ==
Legislator	Legislative Achievement	Seat Held	Took office	Left Office	Party	Ref
Blanche McSmith	1^{st} African-American woman to serve in the Alaska House of Representatives (appointed, not elected)		1959	1962	Democrat	
Bettye Davis	1^{st} African-American woman elected to the Alaska House of Representatives		1990	1996	Democrat	
Bettye Davis	1^{st} African-American woman elected to the Alaska Senate		2000	2013	Democrat	
Willard L. Bowman	1^{st} African-American man elected to the Alaska House of Representatives		1972			
David S. Wilson	1^{st} African-American man elected to the Alaska Senate		2017			

== Arkansas ==
Legislator	Legislative Achievement	Seat Held	Took office	Left Office	Party	Ref
William Henry Grey, James T. White, Anderson Louis Rush, Richard R. Samuels, James W. Mason, and Monroe E. Hawkins	1^{st} African-American men to serve in the Arkansas House of Representatives		1868			
James W. Mason	1^{st} African-American man elected to the Arkansas Senate		1869			
Jerry Jewell	1^{st} African-American man elected to the Arkansas Senate since Reconstruction		1972			
Richard Mays, William Townsend, Henry Wilkins III	1^{st} African-American men elected to the Arkansas House of Representatives since Reconstruction		1972			
Irma Hunter Brown	1^{st} African-American woman elected to the Arkansas House of Representatives		1981	1998	Democrat	
Irma Hunter Brown	1^{st} African-American woman elected to the Arkansas Senate		2003	2008	Democrat	

== Arizona ==
Legislator	Legislative Achievement	Seat Held	Took office	Left Office	Party	Ref
Hayzel Burton Daniels and Carl Sims	1^{st} African-American men elected to the Arizona House of Representatives		1951			
Ethel Maynard	1^{st} African-American woman elected to the Arizona House of Representatives		1967	1972	Democrat	
Cloves Campbell Sr.	1^{st} African-American man elected to the Arizona State Senate		1966			
Carolyn Walker	1^{st} African-American woman elected to the Arizona State Senate	District 23	1987	1991	Democrat	

== California ==
Legislator	Legislative Achievement	Seat Held	Took office	Left Office	Party	Ref
Frederick Madison Roberts	1^{st} African-American man elected to the California State Assembly		1918			
Yvonne Brathwaite Burke	1^{st} African-American woman in the California State Assembly	63rd District	1967	1972	Democrat	
Mervyn Dymally	1^{st} African-American man elected to the California Senate		1967			
Diane E. Watson	1^{st} African-American woman elected to the California Senate		1978	1998	Democrat	
Willie Lewis Brown, Jr.	1^{st} African-American man elected speaker of the California State Assembly		1980			
Karen Bass	1^{st} African-American woman elected Speaker of the California State Assembly		2008			

== Colorado ==
Legislator	Legislative Achievement	Seat Held	Took office	Left Office	Party	Ref
John T. Gunnell	1^{st} African-American man elected to the Colorado House of Representatives		1881			
Gloria Tanner	1^{st} African-American woman elected to the Colorado Senate		1994			
George L. Brown	1^{st} African-American man elected to the Colorado Senate		1957			
Terrance Carroll	1^{st} African-American Speaker of the House		2009			
Peter Groff	1^{st} African-American President of the Senate		2008			
Jamie Jackson	1^{st} African-American woman appointed to the Colorado House of Representatives		2025			

== Connecticut ==
Legislator	Legislative Achievement	Seat Held	Took office	Left Office	Party	Ref
Wilfred X. Johnson	1^{st} African-American man elected to the Connecticut House of Representatives		1958			
Margaret E. Morton	1^{st} African-American woman elected to the Connecticut House of Representatives		1973			
Boce W. Barlow Jr.	1^{st} African-American man elected to the Connecticut State Senate		1966			
Margaret E. Morton	1^{st} African-American woman elected to the Connecticut State Senate		1981			

== Delaware ==
Legislator	Legislative Achievement	Seat Held	Took office	Left Office	Party	Ref
William J. Winchester	1^{st} African-American man elected to the Delaware House of Representatives		1948			
Herman Holloway	1^{st} African-American man elected to the Delaware Senate		1963			
Henrietta R. Johnson	1^{st} African-American woman elected to the Delaware House of Representatives		1970			
Margaret Rose Henry	1^{st} African-American woman elected to the Delaware Senate		1994			

== Florida ==
first African-American man elected to the Florida House of Representatives since Reconstruction: Joe Lang Kershaw (1968)
first African-American woman elected to the Florida House of Representatives: Gwen Cherry (1970)
first African-American woman elected to the Florida Senate: Carrie Meek (1980)
first African-American man elected to the Florida Senate: Arnett Girardeau (1982)

== Georgia ==
first 33 African-American legislators in Georgia: see Original 33 (1868)
first African-American woman elected to the Georgia House of Representatives: Grace Towns Hamilton (1966)
first African-American woman elected to the Georgia State Senate: Nadine Thomas (1992)
first African-American man elected to the Georgia State Senate since Reconstruction: Leroy Johnson (1963)
first African-American man to serve as Majority Leader of the Georgia State Senate: Charles Walker (1996)

== Hawaii ==
first African-American man elected to the Hawaii House of Representatives and Hawaii Senate: Charles Campbell (1976; 1978)
first African-American woman elected to the Hawaii House of Representatives: Helene Hale (2000)

== Idaho ==
first African-American woman elected to the Idaho House of Representatives: Cherie Buckner-Webb (2010)
first African-American woman elected to the Idaho Senate: Cherie Buckner-Webb (2012)
first African-American man elected to the Idaho House of Representatives: Chris Mathias (2020)

== Illinois ==
first African-American man elected to the Illinois General Assembly: John W. E. Thomas (1876)
first African-American man elected to the Illinois Senate: Adelbert H. Roberts (1924)
first African-American woman elected to the Illinois General Assembly: Floy Clements (1958)
first African-American woman elected to the Illinois Senate: Earlean Collins (1977)

== Indiana ==
first African-American man elected to the Indiana House of Representatives: James Sidney Hinton (1880)
first African-American man elected to the Indiana Senate: Robert Brokenburr (1940)
first African-American woman elected to the Indiana House of Representatives: Daisy Riley Lloyd (1964)
first African-American woman elected to the Indiana Senate: Julia Carson (1977)

== Iowa ==
first African-American woman elected to the Iowa House of Representatives: Willie Stevenson Glanton (1964)
first African-American man elected to the Iowa House of Representatives: James H. Jackson (1964)
first African American elected to the Iowa Senate: Thomas Mann (1983) (Note: As of 2022, no African-American woman has served in the Iowa Senate.)

== Kansas ==
first African-American man elected to the Kansas House of Representatives: Alfred Fairfax (1888)
first African-American woman elected to the Kansas House of Representatives: Barbara Ballard (1993)
first African-American men elected to the Kansas Senate: Curtis McClinton Sr. and George Haley (1960)
first African-American woman elected to the Kansas Senate: Oletha Faust-Goudeau (2008)

== Kentucky ==
first African-American man elected to the Kentucky House of Representatives: Charles W. Anderson (1935)
first African-American woman elected to the Kentucky House of Representatives: Amelia Tucker (1961)
first African-American woman elected to the Kentucky Senate: Georgia Davis Powers (1967)
first African-American man elected to the Kentucky Senate: Gerald Neal (1988)

== Louisiana ==
first African-American man elected to the Louisiana House of Representatives since Reconstruction: Ernest Nathan Morial (1969)
first African-American woman elected to the Louisiana House of Representatives: Dorothy Mae Taylor (1971)
first African-American man elected to the Louisiana Senate since Reconstruction: Sidney Barthelemy (1976)
first African-American woman elected to the Louisiana Senate: Diana Bajoie (1991)

== Maine ==
first African-American man elected to the Maine House of Representatives: Gerald Talbot (1972)
first African-American man elected to the Maine Senate: John Jenkins (1996)
first African-American woman elected to the Maine House of Representatives: Rachel Talbot Ross (2016)
first African-American woman elected to the Maine Senate: Jill Duson (2022)
first African-American woman elected speaker of the Maine House of Representatives: Rachel Talbot Ross (2022)

== Maryland ==
first African-American man elected to the Maryland Assembly: Mathias de Sousa (1641)
first African-American man elected to the Maryland Senate: Harry A. Cole (1954)
first African-American woman elected to the Maryland House of Delegates: Irma George Dixon (1958)
first African-American woman elected to the Maryland Senate: Verda F. Welcome (1958)

== Massachusetts ==
first African-American men elected to the Massachusetts House of Representatives: Edward G. Walker and Charles Lewis Mitchell (1866)
first African-American woman elected to the Massachusetts House of Representatives: Doris Bunte (1973)
first African-American man elected to the Massachusetts Senate: Bill Owens (1975)
first African-American woman elected to the Massachusetts Senate: Dianne Wilkerson (1993)

== Michigan ==
first African-American man elected to Michigan House of Representatives: William Webb Ferguson (1893)
first African-American man elected to Michigan Senate: Charles A. Roxborough (1930)
first African-American woman elected to the Michigan House of Representatives: Charline White (1950)
first African-American woman elected to Michigan Senate: Cora Brown (1952)

== Minnesota ==
first African-American man elected to the Minnesota House of Representatives: John Francis Wheaton (1898)
first African-American man elected to the Minnesota Senate: B. Robert Lewis (1972)
first African-American woman elected to the Minnesota House of Representatives: Neva Walker (2001)
first African-American women elected to the Minnesota Senate: Erin Maye Quade, Zaynab Mohamed, and Clare Oumou Verbeten (2022)

== Mississippi ==
first African-American man elected to the Mississippi House of Representatives: John R. Lynch (1869)
first African-American Speaker of the Mississippi House of Representatives: John R. Lynch (1873)
first African-American man elected to the Mississippi House of Representatives since Reconstruction: Robert G. Clark Jr. (1967)
first African-American man elected to the Mississippi State Senate since Reconstruction: Arthur Tate (1979)
first African-American woman elected to the Mississippi House of Representatives: Alyce Clarke (1985)
first African-American woman elected to the Mississippi State Senate: Alice Harden (1988)

== Missouri ==
first African-American man elected to the Missouri House of Representatives: Walthall M. Moore (1921)
first African-American woman elected to the Missouri House of Representatives: DeVerne Lee Calloway (1962)
first African-American man elected to the Missouri Senate: Theodore McNeal (1960)
first African-American woman elected to the Missouri Senate: Gwen B. Giles (1977)

== Montana ==
first African-American woman elected to the Montana Legislature: Geraldine W. Travis (1974)

== Nebraska ==
first African-American man elected to the former Nebraska House of Representatives: Matthew Ricketts (1893)
first African-American man elected to the unicameral Nebraska Legislature: John Adams Jr. (1937)
first African-American woman appointed to the Nebraska Legislature: JoAnn Maxey (1977)
first African-American women elected to the Nebraska Legislature: Tanya Cook and Brenda Council (2009)

== Nevada ==
first African-American man elected to the Nevada Assembly: Woodrow Wilson (1966)
first African-American man elected to the Nevada Senate: Joe Neal (1972)
first African-American woman elected to the Nevada Senate: Bernice Mathews (1994)
first African-American woman elected to the Nevada Assembly: Dina Neal (2011)

== New Hampshire ==
first African American elected to the New Hampshire House of Representatives: Henry B. Richardson (1974)
first African American elected to the New Hampshire Senate: Melanie Levesque (2018)

== New Jersey ==
first African-American man elected to the New Jersey General Assembly: Walter G. Alexander I (1920)
first African-American woman elected to the New Jersey General Assembly: Madaline A. Williams (1957)
first African-American man elected to the New Jersey Senate: Hutchins F. Inge (1965)
first African-American woman elected to the New Jersey Senate: Wynona Lipman (1971)
first African-American man to serve as Speaker of the General Assembly: Walter G. Alexander I (1921)
first African-American man elected as Speaker of the General Assembly: S. Howard Woodson (1974)

== New Mexico ==
first African-American man elected to the New Mexico House of Representatives: Lenton Malry (1969)
first African-American woman elected to the New Mexico House of Representatives: Sheryl Williams Stapleton (1995)
first African-American man elected to the New Mexico Senate: Harold Pope Jr. (2020)

== New York ==
first African-American man elected to the New York State Assembly: Edward A. Johnson (1917)
first African-American man elected to the New York State Senate: Julius A. Archibald (1953)
first African-American woman elected to the New York State Assembly: Bessie A. Buchanan (1955)
first African-American woman elected to the New York State Senate: Constance Baker Motley (1964)
first African-American man elected Speaker of the New York State Assembly: Carl Heastie (2015)

== North Carolina ==
first African-American men elected to the North Carolina Senate: John R. Bryant (1870)
first African-American man elected to the North Carolina House of Representatives: Hanson T. Hughes (1876)
first African-American woman to serve in the North Carolina House of Representatives: Annie Brown Kennedy (appointed, 1979; elected, 1982)
first African-American woman to serve in the North Carolina Senate: Jeanne Hopkins Lucas (1993, appointed and re-elected)

== North Dakota ==
first African-American woman elected to the North Dakota House of Representatives: Hamida Dakane (2022)

== Ohio ==
first African-American man elected to the Ohio House of Representatives: George Washington Williams (1880)
first African-American man elected to the Ohio Senate: John Patterson Green (1892)
first African-American woman elected to the Ohio House of Representatives: Helen Rankin (1978)
first African-American woman elected to the Ohio Senate: Rhine McLin (1994)

== Oklahoma ==
first African-American man elected to the Oklahoma House of Representatives: A. C. Hamlin (1908)
first African-American man elected to the Oklahoma Senate: E. Melvin Porter (1965)
first African-American woman elected to the Oklahoma House of Representatives: Hannah Atkins (1968)
first African-American women elected to the Oklahoma Senate: Maxine Horner and Vicki Miles-LaGrange (1987)
first African-American Speaker of the Oklahoma House of Representatives: T. W. Shannon (2013)

== Oregon ==
first African-American man elected to the Oregon House of Representatives: William McCoy (1972)
first African-American man appointed to the Oregon Senate: William McCoy (circa 1975, appointed and re-elected)
first African-American woman elected to the Oregon House of Representatives: Margaret Carter (1985)
first African-American woman elected to the Oregon Senate: Avel Gordly (1996)

== Pennsylvania ==
first African-American man elected to the Pennsylvania House of Representatives: Harry W. Bass (1911)
first African-American woman elected to the Pennsylvania House of Representatives: Crystal Bird Fauset (1938)
first African-American man elected to the Pennsylvania State Senate: Herbert Arlene (1967)
first African-American woman elected to the Pennsylvania State Senate: Roxanne Jones (1985)
first African-American speaker of the Pennsylvania House: K. Leroy Irvis (1977)
first African-American woman speaker of the Pennsylvania House: Joanna McClinton (2023)

== Rhode Island ==
first African American elected to the Rhode Island House of Representatives: Mahlon Van Horne (1885)
first African-American man elected to the Rhode Island Senate: Charles D. Walton (1983)
first African-American woman elected to the Rhode Island House of Representatives: Maria Lopes (1989)

== South Carolina ==
first African-American men elected to the South Carolina House of Representatives since Reconstruction: Herbert Fielding, James Felder, and I. S. Levy Johnson (1970)
first African-American woman elected to the South Carolina House of Representatives: Juanita Goggins (1975)
first African-American man elected to the South Carolina Senate since Reconstruction: Isaiah DeQuincey Newman (1983)
first African-American woman elected to the South Carolina Senate: Maggie Wallace Glover (1992)

== South Dakota ==
first African-American man elected to the South Dakota House of Representatives: Tony Randolph (2018)

== Tennessee ==
first African-American man elected to the Tennessee House of Representatives: Sampson W. Keeble (1873)
first African-American man elected to the Tennessee House of Representatives since Reconstruction: Archie Walter Willis Jr. (1964)
first African-American woman elected to the Tennessee House of Representatives: Dorothy Lavinia Brown (1966)
first African-American men elected to the Tennessee Senate: Avon Williams and J. O. Patterson Jr. (1969)
first African-American woman elected to the Tennessee Senate: Thelma Harper (1991)

== Texas ==
first African-American men elected to the Texas Senate: George T. Ruby and Matthew Gaines (1869)
first African-American men elected to the Texas House of Representatives: 14 men (1869)
first African-American woman elected to the Texas Senate: Barbara Jordan (1966)
first African-American men elected to the Texas House of Representatives since Reconstruction: Mickey Leland and Craig Washington (1972)
first African-American women elected to the Texas House of Representatives: Senfronia Thompson and Eddie Bernice Johnson (1973)

== Utah ==
first African-American man elected to the Utah House of Representatives: Robert Harris (1976)
first African-American man elected to the Utah Senate: Terry Lee Williams (1983)
first African-American woman elected to the Utah House of Representatives: Sandra Hollins (2015)

== Vermont ==
first African-American man elected to Vermont House of Representatives: Alexander Twilight (1836)
first African-American woman elected to Vermont House of Representatives: Louvenia Bright (1988)
first African-American man elected to the Vermont Senate: Julius D. Canns (1992)

== Virginia ==
first 24 African-American men elected to the Virginia House of Delegates: William H. Brisby, Henry Cox, Isaac Edmundson, Ballard T. Edwards, George Fayerman, Ross Hamilton, Charles E. Hodges, John Q. Hodges, Benjamin F. Jones, Peter K. Jones, Robert G. W. Jones, James F. Lipscomb, J. B. Miller Jr., Peter G. Morgan, F. S. Norton, Robert Norton, Alexander Owen, Caesar Perkins, Fountain M. Perkins, William H. Ragsdale, George Lewis Seaton, William N. Stevens, John Watson, and Ellis Wilson (1869)
first African-American men elected to the Virginia Senate: James W. D. Bland, Isaiah L. Lyons, William P. Moseley, Frank Moss, John Robinson, and George Teamoh (1869)
first African-American man elected to the Virginia House of Delegates since Reconstruction: William Ferguson Reid (1968)
first African-American man elected to the Virginia Senate since Reconstruction: Douglas Wilder (1970)
first African-American woman elected to the Virginia Senate: Yvonne B. Miller (1988)
first African-American woman elected to the Virginia House of Delegates: Yvonne B. Miller (1984)

== Washington ==
first African-American man elected to the Washington State Legislature: William Owen Bush (1889)
first African-American man elected to the Washington State Senate: John Henry Ryan (1933)
first African-American woman appointed to the Washington State Legislature: Marjorie Pitter King (1965)
first African-American woman elected to the Washington Legislature: Peggy Maxie (1971)
first African-American woman appointed to the Washington State Senate: Rosa Franklin (1993)

== Wisconsin ==
first African-American man elected to the Wisconsin State Assembly: Lucian H. Palmer (1906)
first African-American woman elected to the Wisconsin State Assembly: Marcia P. Coggs (1977)
first African-American man elected to the Wisconsin Senate: Monroe Swan (1973)
first African-American woman elected to the Wisconsin Senate: Gwen Moore (1993)

== West Virginia ==
first African-American man elected to the West Virginia House of Delegates: Christopher Payne (1886)
first African-American woman to serve in the West Virginia House of Delegates: Minnie Buckingham Harper (appointed) (1928)
first African-American woman elected to the West Virginia House of Delegates: Elizabeth Simpson Drewry (1950)
first African-American woman elected to the West Virginia Senate: Marie Redd (1998)
first African-American man to serve in the West Virginia Senate: Owens Brown (appointed) (2021)

== Wyoming ==
first African-American man elected to the Wyoming Legislature: William Jefferson Hardin (1879)
first African-American woman elected to the Wyoming Legislature: Harriet Elizabeth Byrd (1988)

== First speakers and caucus leaders ==
- Alabama
  - Quinton Ross, (Senate, Minority)
  - Anthony Daniels (House, Minority)
- Arizona
  - Leah Landrum Taylor (Senate, Minority)
- California
  - Willie Brown (Assembly, Speaker (male))
  - Karen Bass (Assembly, Speaker (female))
- Colorado
  - Terrance Carroll (Assembly, Speaker)
  - Peter Groff (Senate, President)
- Georgia
  - Charles Walker (Senate, Majority)
  - Robert Brown (Senate, Minority)
  - Stacey Abrams (House, Minority)
- Illinois
  - Cecil A. Partee (Senate, President)
- Louisiana
  - Diana Bajoie (Senate, President Pro Tempore)
- Maine
  - Rachel Talbot Ross (House, Speaker)
- Maryland
  - Adrienne A. Jones (House, Speaker)
- Michigan
  - Kwame Kilpatrick (House, Minority)
- Mississippi
  - John R. Lynch (House, Speaker)
- New Jersey
  - Walter G. Alexander I (Assembly, acting Speaker)
  - S. Howard Woodson (Assembly, Speaker)
- New York
  - Andrea Stewart-Cousins (Senate, Majority Leader)
  - Carl Heastie (Assembly, Speaker)
  - David Paterson (Senate, Minority)
- Ohio
  - William L. Mallory Sr. (House, Majority (male))
  - Tracy Maxwell Heard (House, Majority (female), Minority)
  - Ben Espy (Senate, Minority (male))
  - Rhine McLin (Senate, Minority (female))
  - Jack Ford (House, Minority)
- Oklahoma
  - T. W. Shannon (House, Speaker)
- Oregon
  - Jackie Winters (Senate, Minority)
- Pennsylvania
  - K. Leroy Irvis (House, Speaker)
  - Joanna McClinton (House, Minority (female))
- Tennessee
  - Karen Camper (House, Minority)
- Virginia
  - Charniele Herring (House, Majority)

== See also ==
- African-American officeholders in the United States, 1789–1866
- African American officeholders from the end of the Civil War until before 1900
- List of African-American officeholders (1900–1959)
