= Henry Wilkins =

Henry Wilkins may refer to:

- Henry St Clair Wilkins (1828–1896), British Army general, engineer and architect in India
- Henry Wilkins III (1930–1991), American politician, member of the Arkansas General Assembly
- Hank Wilkins (born 1954), American politician, member of the Arkansas General Assembly
- Henry Wilkins (basketball) (born 1990), British basketball player

== See also ==
- Henry Wilkens (1855–1895), German-born American soldier and Medal of Honor recipient in the Nez Perce War
