= 2004 Connecticut Senate election =

2004 Connecticut State Senate election
- November 2, 2004

All 36 seats in the Connecticut State Senate 19 seats needed for a majority
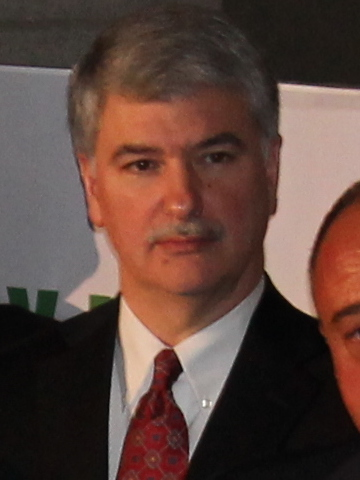

	Majority party	Minority party
Leader	Donald Williams	Louis DeLuca
Party	Democratic	Republican
Leader since	July 1, 2004	2001
Leader's seat	29th	32nd
Last election	21	15
Seats after	24	12
Seat change	▲3	▼3
- Results: Democratic hold Democratic gain Republican hold
President pro tempore of the Senate before election
Donald Williams
Democratic
Elected President pro tempore of the Senate
Donald Williams
Democratic

The 2004 Connecticut State Senate elections took place as part of the biennial 2004 United States Elections. All 36 seats of the Connecticut State Senate were up for re-election. Senators serve two-year terms and are up for re-election every election cycle. The August 10th primary elections decided candidates that appeared on the ballot for the General election. The General Election took place on November 2, 2004.

== Predictions ==
Source	Ranking	As of
Rothenberg	Safe D	October 1, 2004

== Summary ==
↓
21	15
Democratic	Republican

=== Results ===
The Democrats kept the majority with a 21-15 Majority.

=== District 1 ===
2004 Connecticut State Senate election, District 1
Party	Candidate	Votes	%
Democratic	John Fonfara (incumbent)	15,459	
Green	S. Michael DeRosa	2,050	
Working Families	Gilberto Concepcion	533	
Total votes		18,042	100.0%
Democratic hold			

=== District 2 ===
2004 Connecticut State Senate election, District 2
Party	Candidate	Votes	%
Democratic	Eric D. Coleman (incumbent)	22,659	
Working Families	Maria Torres	1,370	
Total votes		24,029	100.0%
Democratic hold			

=== District 3 ===
2004 Connecticut State Senate election, District 3
Party	Candidate	Votes	%
Democratic	Gary LeBeau (incumbent)	25,107	
Republican	Ron Morin, Sr.	11,649	
Working Families	Megan C. Batchelder	889	
Total votes		37,645	100.0%
Democratic hold			

=== District 4 ===
2004 Connecticut State Senate election, District 4
Party	Candidate	Votes	%
Democratic	Mary Ann Handley	30,323	
Republican	Michael T. Fitzpatrick	14,749	
Working Families	Adam D. Johnson	671	
Total votes		45,743	100.0%
Democratic hold			

=== District 5 ===
2004 Connecticut State Senate election, District 5
Party	Candidate	Votes	%
Democratic	Jonathan Harris	27,869	
Republican	Kevin Connors	20,629	
Working Families	Jonathan Harris	633	
Total votes		49,131	100.0%
Democratic hold			

=== District 6 ===
2004 Connecticut State Senate election, District 6
Party	Candidate	Votes	%
Democratic	Donald DeFronzo (incumbent)	20,240	
Working Families	Stephen V. Burdo	969	
Total votes		21,209	100.0%
Democratic hold			

=== District 7 ===
2004 Connecticut State Senate election, District 7
Party	Candidate	Votes	%
Republican	John Kissel (incumbent)	21,072	
Democratic	Bill Kiner	20,392	
Total votes		41,464	100.0%
Republican hold			

=== District 8 ===
2004 Connecticut State Senate election, District 8
Party	Candidate	Votes	%
Republican	Thomas Herlihy (incumbent)	28,492	
Democratic	Israel I. Gordon	14,766	
Green	Thomas J. Sevigny	2,371	
Working Families	Caitlin Reid Sullivan	1,224	
Total votes		46,853	100.0%
Republican hold			

=== District 9 ===
2004 Connecticut State Senate election, District 9
Party	Candidate	Votes	%
Democratic	Biagio Ciotto (incumbent)	27,877	
Republican	Ralph Capenera	17,806	
Total votes		45,683	100.0%
Democratic hold			

=== District 10 ===
2004 Connecticut State Senate election, District 10
Party	Candidate	Votes	%
Democratic	Toni Harp (incumbent)	21,496	100.0%
Total votes		21,496	100.0%
Democratic hold			

=== District 11 ===
2004 Connecticut State Senate election, District 11
Party	Candidate	Votes	%
Democratic	Martin Looney (incumbent)	23,364	100.0%
Total votes		23,364	100.0%
Democratic hold			

=== District 12 ===
2004 Connecticut State Senate election, District 12
Party	Candidate	Votes	%
Democratic	J. Edward Meyer	25,494	
Republican	William Aniskovich (incumbent)	23,932	
Total votes		49,426	100.0%
Democratic gain from Republican			

=== District 13 ===
2004 Connecticut State Senate election, District 13
Party	Candidate	Votes	%
Democratic	Thomas Gaffey (incumbent)	27,102	
Republican	Tod O. Dixon	10,672	
Working Families	Thomas Gaffey (incumbent)	1,090	
Total votes		38,864	100.0%
Democratic hold			

=== District 14 ===
2004 Connecticut State Senate election, District 14
Party	Candidate	Votes	%
Democratic	Gayle Slossberg	22,975	
Republican	Win Smith, Jr. (incumbent)	21,286	
Total votes		44,261	100.0%
Democratic gain from Republican			

=== District 15 ===
2004 Connecticut State Senate election, District 15
Party	Candidate	Votes	%
Democratic	Joan Hartley (incumbent)	17,057	
Independent	Emidio C. Cerasale	1,835	
Total votes		18,892	100.0%
Democratic hold			

=== District 16 ===
2004 Connecticut State Senate election, District 16
Party	Candidate	Votes	%
Democratic	Chris Murphy (incumbent)	24,026	
Republican	Christopher J. O'Brien	14,872	
Independent	Frank A. Burgio, Sr.	891	
Working Families	Derek John Ljongquist	294	
Total votes		40,083	100.0%
Democratic hold			

=== District 17 ===
2004 Connecticut State Senate election, District 17
Party	Candidate	Votes	%
Democratic	Joseph Crisco Jr. (incumbent)	24,552	
Working Families	James S. Bartlett	1,466	
Total votes		26,018	100.0%
Democratic hold			

=== District 18 ===
2004 Connecticut State Senate election, District 18
Party	Candidate	Votes	%
Republican	Cathy Welles Cook (incumbent)	21,064	
Democratic	Andrew Maynard	17,603	
Total votes		38,667	100.0%
Republican hold			

=== District 19 ===
2004 Connecticut State Senate election, District 19
Party	Candidate	Votes	%
Democratic	Edith Prague (incumbent)	24,284	
Republican	Catherine Marx	14,640	
Total votes		38,924	100.0%
Democratic hold			

=== District 20 ===
2004 Connecticut State Senate election, District 20
Party	Candidate	Votes	%
Democratic	Andrea Stillman	24,362	
Republican	Mark Diebolt	15,371	
Total votes		39,733	100.0%
Democratic hold			

=== District 21 ===
2004 Connecticut State Senate election, District 21
Party	Candidate	Votes	%
Republican	George Gunther (incumbent)	26,713	
Working Families	William A. McGuire	2,778	
Total votes		29,491	100.0%
Republican hold			

=== District 22 ===
2004 Connecticut State Senate election, District 22
Party	Candidate	Votes	%
Democratic	Bill Finch (incumbent)	20,303	
Republican	Robert Russo	17,285	
Working Families	Glenn P. Kalata	312	
Total votes		37,900	100.0%
Democratic hold			

=== District 23 ===
2004 Connecticut State Senate election, District 23
Party	Candidate	Votes	%
Democratic	Ernest E. Newton II	14,036	
Republican	Jerry A. Blackwell	4,509	
Working Families	Ernest E. Newton II	592	
Total votes		19,137	100.0%
Democratic hold			

=== District 24 ===
2004 Connecticut State Senate election, District 24
Party	Candidate	Votes	%
Republican	David Cappiello (incumbent)	22,835	
Democratic	Howard M. Henner	11,314	
Libertarian	John J. McGowann III	297	
Independent	Catherine V. DiBuono	282	
Working Families	David Isaac Bonan	201	
Total votes		34,929	100.0%
Republican hold			

=== District 25 ===
2004 Connecticut State Senate election, District 25
Party	Candidate	Votes	%
Democratic	Bob Duff	22,072	
Republican	Jeff Konspore	15,778	
Working Families	Bob Duff	531	
Total votes		38,381	100.0%
Democratic gain from Republican			

=== District 26 ===
2004 Connecticut State Senate election, District 26
Party	Candidate	Votes	%
Republican	Judith G. Freedman (incumbent)	30,665	
Democratic	Arlo Ellison	20,238	
Independent	William A. Gulya	411	
Total votes		51,314	100.0%
Republican hold			

=== District 27 ===
2004 Connecticut State Senate election, District 27
Party	Candidate	Votes	%
Democratic	Andrew J. McDonald (incumbent)	19,298	
Republican	Richard H. G. Cunningham	12,167	
Working Families	Andy D. Dolan	259	
Total votes		31,724	100.0%
Democratic hold			

=== District 28 ===
2004 Connecticut State Senate election, District 28
Party	Candidate	Votes	%
Republican	John P. McKinney (incumbent)	31,324	
Democratic	Morgan Graham	16,732	
Total votes		48,056	100.0%
Republican hold			

=== District 29 ===
2004 Connecticut State Senate election, District 29
Party	Candidate	Votes	%
Democratic	Donald E. Williams Jr. (incumbent)	23,149	100.0%
Total votes		23,149	100.0%
Democratic hold			

=== District 30 ===
2004 Connecticut State Senate election, District 30
Party	Candidate	Votes	%
Republican	Andrew Roraback (incumbent)	31,818	
Working Families	Dennis B. O'Neil	2,298	
Total votes		34,116	100.0%
Republican hold			

=== District 31 ===
2004 Connecticut State Senate election, District 31
Party	Candidate	Votes	%
Democratic	Thomas Colapietro (incumbent)	19,079	
Republican	Beverly R. Bobroske	17,212	
Total votes		36,291	100.0%
Democratic hold			

=== District 32 ===
2004 Connecticut State Senate election, District 32
Party	Candidate	Votes	%
Republican	Louis DeLuca (incumbent)	31,961	99.99%
Write-In	John M. Joey	2	0.01%
Total votes		31,963	100.0%
Republican hold			

=== District 33 ===
2004 Connecticut State Senate election, District 33
Party	Candidate	Votes	%
Democratic	Eileen Daily (incumbent)	31,705	
Republican	Emanuel Manny Misenti	12,301	
Green	Colin D. Bennett	1,069	
Working Families	Jason A. Potts	398	
Total votes		45,473	100.0%
Democratic hold			

=== District 34 ===
2004 Connecticut State Senate election, District 34
Party	Candidate	Votes	%
Republican	Len Fasano (incumbent)	21,374	100.0%
Working Families	Len Fasano (incumbent)	2,983	100.0%
Total votes		24,357	100.0%
Republican hold			

=== District 35 ===
2004 Connecticut State Senate election, District 35
Party	Candidate	Votes	%
Republican	Tony Guglielmo (incumbent)	31,239	
Democratic	Joe Merluzzo	14,474	
Working Families	Janeen Dorothy Rose	785	
Total votes		46,498	100.0%
Republican hold			

=== District 36 ===
2004 Connecticut State Senate election, District 36
Party	Candidate	Votes	%
Republican	William H. Nickerson (incumbent)	28,424	
Green	John A. Amarilios	2,615	
Total votes		31,039	100.0%
Republican hold			
