= Ceasar =

Ceasar may refer to:

- Ceasar Mitchell (born 1968), American politician
- Ceasar Perkins, American politician
- Ceasar and Chuy, an American animated television series
- The Ceasars, a group of three Italian music producers
- Camelia Ceasar, Romanian footballer
- Jamie Ceasar, American film photographer
- Sherita Ceasar, American telecommunications engineer

== See also ==
- Caesar (disambiguation)
