= Andre Baker =

Andre Baker may refer to:

- Andre Baker (politician)
- Andre Baker (wrestler)
