= Winthrop Smith (politician) =

American politician

Member of the Connecticut Senate from the 14th district
- In office 1993–2005
- Preceded by: Max Case
- Succeeded by: Gayle Slossberg

Milford City Attorney
- In office January 2009 – November 2011

Personal details
- Party: Republican
- Relatives: Helen Smith (great-aunt)

Winthrop Smith Jr., also known as Win Smith, is a Connecticut politician. Smith served on the Connecticut State Senate and as the Milford City Attorney.

== Career ==
Smith served on the Connecticut State Senate for the 14th district from when he won the 1992 election to when he lost the 2004 election. During his time in the State Senate, Smith introduced an amendment to the Connecticut Constitution that would limit the number of terms that members of the General Assembly to 5. Smith's amendment proposal was criticized to then Milford Democratic party chairman Richard Smith because Winthrop Smith was seeking a 6th term while introducing the amendment proposal.

In the State Senate, Smith was Assistant Majority Leader, Assistant Minority Leader, Chairman of the Government Administration and Elections Committee, Chairman of the Bill Screening Committee, Member of the Finance Committee and Chair of the Bonding Subcommittee, and ranking member of the Banking Committee.

Smith was the Milford City Attorney from January 2009 to November 2011. Smith was a member of the Connecticut State Ethics Commission and the board of directors for the Connecticut Association of Municipal Attorneys. Smith unsuccessfully ran for a seat on the Milford Board of Aldermen in 2023 and 2025.

== Personal life ==
Smith is the grandnephew of politician Helen Smith.
