= Senator Jewell =

Senator Jewell may refer to:

- Jerry Donal Jewell (1930–2002), Arkansas State Senate
- William S. Jewell (1867–1956), Illinois State Senate
