= Rodney E. Slater =

American politician

Rodney Slater
- Slater at Politics and Prose bookstore in 2026

13th United States Secretary of Transportation
- In office February 14, 1997 – January 20, 2001
- President: Bill Clinton
- Deputy: Mortimer L. Downey
- Preceded by: Federico Peña
- Succeeded by: Norman Mineta

Administrator of the Federal Highway Administration
- In office June 3, 1993 – February 14, 1997
- President: Bill Clinton
- Preceded by: Thomas D. Larson
- Succeeded by: Kenneth R. Wykle

Personal details
- Born: Rodney Earl Slater; February 23, 1955 (age 71) Tutwiler, Mississippi, U.S.
- Party: Democratic
- Relatives: Henry Wilkins III (father-in-law); Josetta Wilkins (mother-in-law)
- Education: Eastern Michigan University (BA); University of Arkansas, Fayetteville (JD)

Rodney Earl Slater (born February 23, 1955) is an American politician of the Democratic Party who served as the United States Secretary of Transportation under President Bill Clinton from 1997 to 2001. Prior to being appointed to the Clinton Cabinet, Slater served as the administrator of the Federal Highway Administration from 1993 to 1997.

== Education ==
Slater graduated from Eastern Michigan University in 1977, and received his Juris Doctor degree from the University of Arkansas School of Law in 1980.

== Early career ==
Slater became a research assistant to the State Judiciary Committee of the Arkansas Constitutional Convention in 1979–80, an assistant attorney general for the state of Arkansas in 1980. He was appointed to several state government positions in Arkansas by Bill Clinton. Positions included assistant to the governor between 1983 and 1987, and member of the Arkansas State Highway Commission between 1987 and 1993. Slater was also the director of governmental affairs for Arkansas State University during that time.

== Appointment to federal positions ==
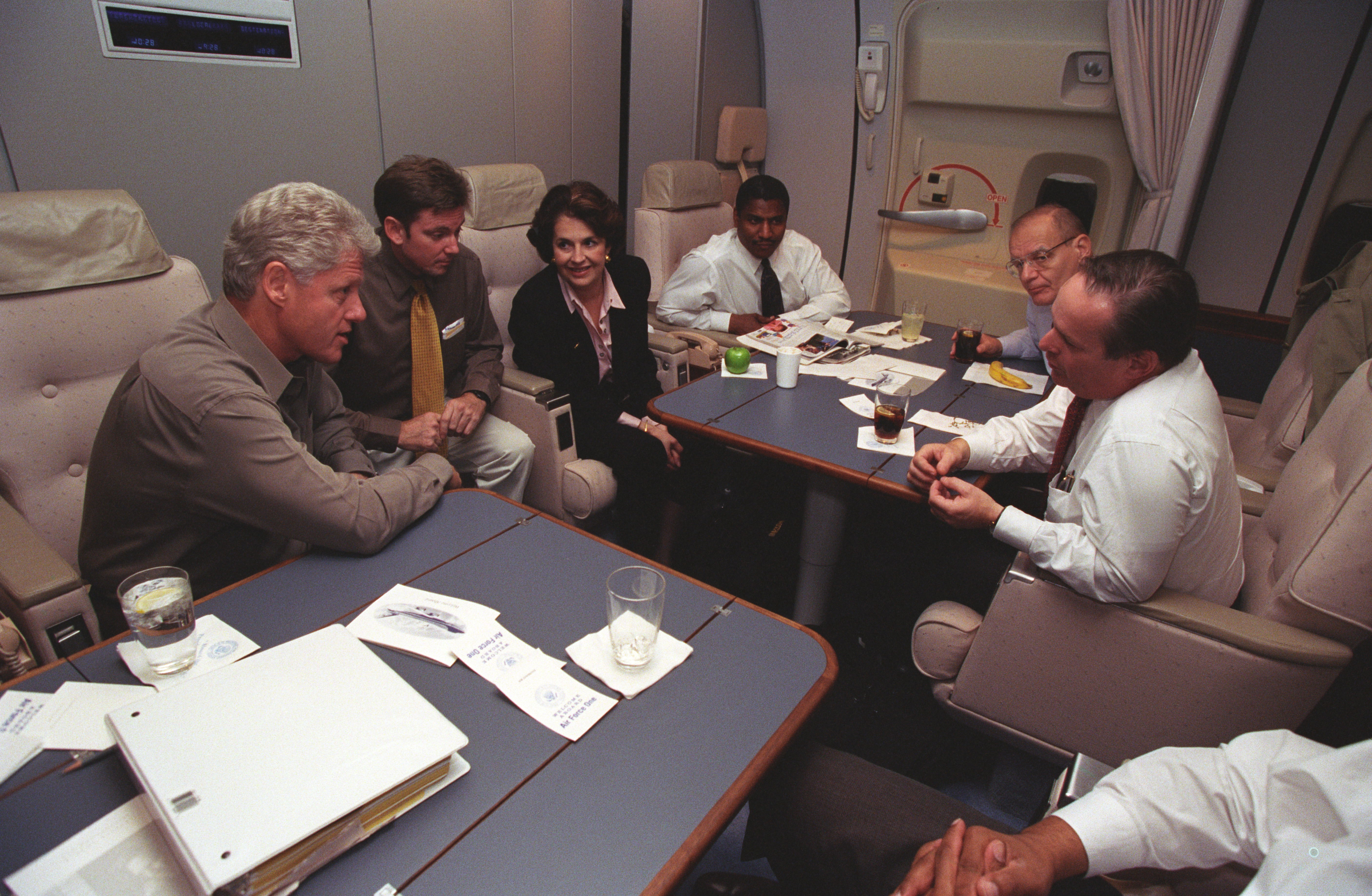
Rodney Slater on Air Force One with President Clinton in 1999.

After Clinton was elected president, 1993 Slater became the first African-American Director of the Federal Highway Administration.

In 1997, Slater was appointed to be the Secretary of Transportation. He was the second African American to hold that post.

== Private sector ==
Slater is part of a group of investors headed by Stan Kasten that successfully purchased the Major League Baseball team, the Washington Nationals.

Slater is a partner at the Washington, D.C. law firm of Squire Patton Boggs, where he is head of the transportation practice and works on projects related to the transportation infrastructure.

Slater served on the board of Northwest Airlines, continuing on with Delta Air Lines after their merger in 2008.

As of December 3, 2014 Slater was appointed to serve as special counsel to Takata Corporation in support of Takata's dealings on the 2013 airbag recall issues they are facing. They will advise the Company as they address the current challenges Takata faces. He also led a safety advisory panel for Toyota and served as independent monitor for Fiat Chrysler Automobiles.

== Personal life ==
Slater is married to Cassandra Wilkins, daughter of Arkansas state legislators Henry Wilkins III and Josetta Wilkins.

== See also ==
- List of African-American United States Cabinet members

Political offices
Preceded by Federico Peña	United States Secretary of Transportation; 1997–2001	Succeeded by Norman Mineta
U.S. order of precedence (ceremonial)
Preceded by William M. Daley as Former U.S. Cabinet Member	Order of precedence of the United States as Former U.S. Cabinet Member	Succeeded by Lawrence Summers as Former U.S. Cabinet Member
