= Bryan Anderson =

Bryan Anderson may refer to:

- Bryan Anderson (American football) (born 1980), retired American football player drafted by the Chicago Bears of the National Football League
- Bryan Anderson (baseball) (born 1986), catcher in the Oakland Athletics organization
- Bryan Anderson (Canadian politician) (1942–2020), politician in Edmonton, Alberta, Canada
- Bryan Anderson (American politician), politician in New Haven, Connecticut
- Bryan Anderson (author) (born 1981), American author, veteran of the Iraq war

== See also ==
- Brian Anderson (disambiguation)
