= Senator Maroney =

Senator Maroney may refer to:

- James Maroney (fl. 2010s–present), Connecticut State Senate
- Mike Maroney (born 1968), West Virginia State Senate
