= Bryan Anderson (American politician) =

American politician and teacher (born 1955)

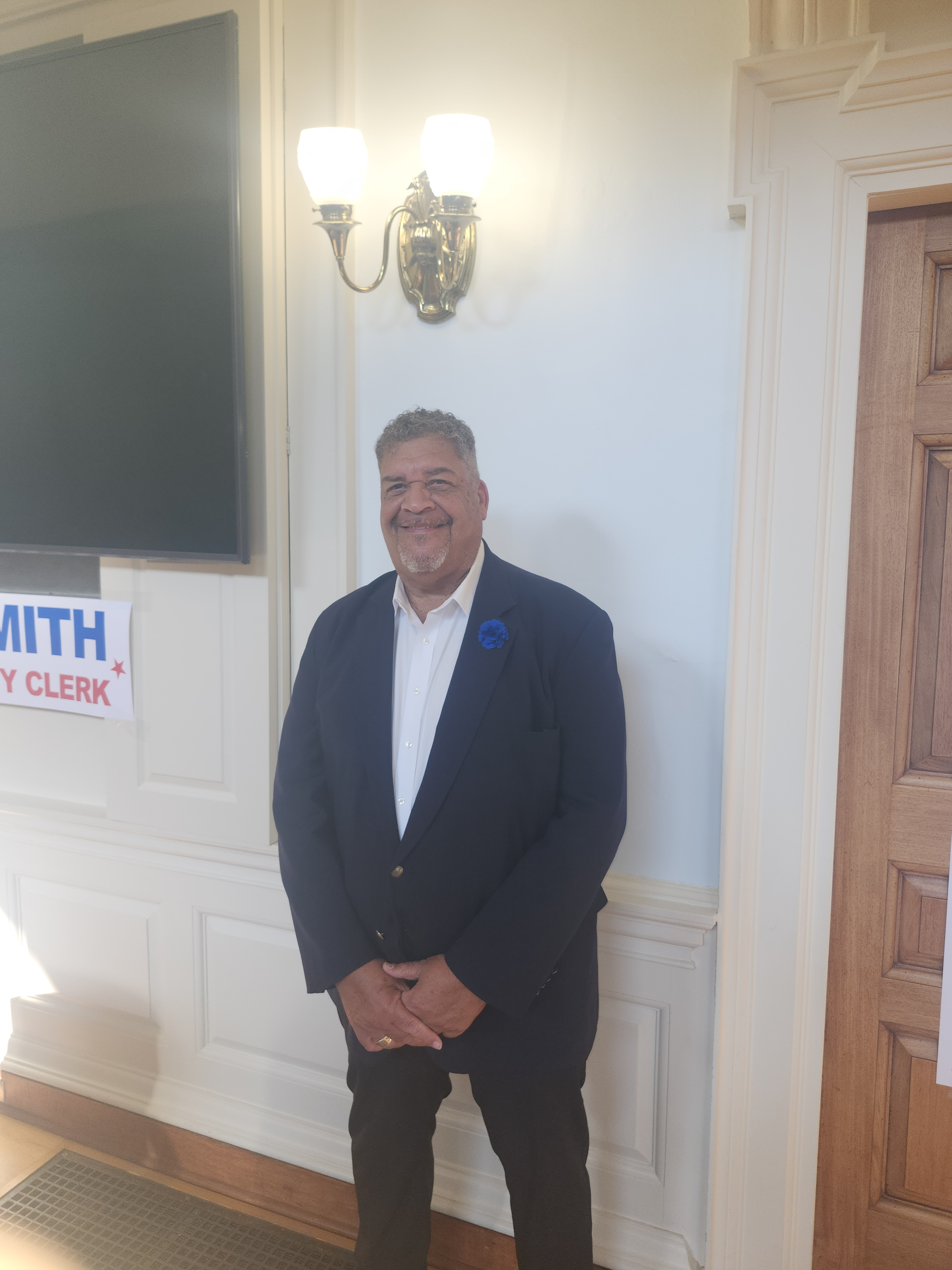
- Anderson in 2025

New Haven Ward 27 Alder
- In office 1992–1994

Milford Alderman 5th district
- In office 2011–2019

Personal details
- Born: 1955 (age 70–71) New Haven, Connecticut, U.S.
- Education: University of Connecticut, Fordham University

Bryan Neil Anderson (born 1955) is an American politician and former public school teacher. Anderson was New Haven's Ward 27 alder from 1992 to 1994 and Milford's 5th district alderman.

== Early life ==
Born 1955, Anderson's family lived in subsidized housing in New Haven, Connecticut for veterans returning from WWII, gaining this because Anderson's father severed in the Philippines and Guam. The family later moved to Hamden, Connecticut, where Anderson grew up.

When Anderson was 14, he worked as an intern for late U.S. Representative Stewart McKinney.

Anderson attended Hamden High School. Anderson studied political science and, drama at the University of Connecticut. In 1977, Anderson was elected the University of Connecticut Board of Trustee's student representative on the Connecticut Board of Higher Education.

In 1973, Anderson became a messenger for the Connecticut State Senate.

== Career ==
=== Politics ===
Anderson was elected as a Hamden constable in the 1973 race. Anderson became the youngest holder of public office in Hamden's history.

Anderson successfully ran Larry DeNardis’s 1980 race for Connecticut's third House Congressional District.

Charles Allen III beat Anderson for the 10th District seat in the State Senate in the 1991 race. (Note: Allen got 2,867 votes, while Anderson got 2,426 votes.)

Anderson moved back to New Haven, beating Martin Dunleavy to become the Ward 27 alderman in 1992. As an alder Anderson ran programs such as the city's housing programs and a drug treatment program, before leaving office in 1994. In the same year as his election, Anderson wrote a letter to the then Governor of Connecticut, Lowell Weicker Jr., asking for property tax relief. The letter condemned the 46% tax increase over the previous 4 years. The letter was signed by 21 of the 30 New Haven alders.

In 1997, Anderson moved to Milford, Connecticut. Anderson was Milford's Fifth District Aldermen from 2011 to 2019. Anderson was Milford's first African American alderman.

Anderson switched from a Republican to a Democrat in 1998, citing the Republican led impeachment of Bill Clinton as the last straw.

Anderson stated he was going to run for House Representative in Connecticut's third Congressional District in 2017. This decision challenged Democrat and longtime holder of the seat, Rosa DeLauro. Anderson's campaign was met with mixed reactions by members of his own party. Anderson later suspended his campaign for the seat.

A debate in Milford's Board of Aldermen that resulted in new parking regulations started when Anderson investigated one of his constituent's complaints. During his investigation of the complaint, Anderson found that a truck was leaking oil that was going into a nearby pond, and that there wasn't anything in the city regulations preventing the truck from being there,.

Anderson ran for the state house representative of Connecticut's 119th district in the 2020 race. Anderson lost to Kathy Kennedy, losing by 87 votes. (Note: Kennedy got 6,037 votes, while Anderson got 5,950 votes.)

=== Education ===
In 2002, Anderson became an elementary school teacher in the Bronx, commuting from his home in Milford. Anderson retired from his teaching job in 2017. Anderson gained his education degree at Fordham University.
