= Connecticut's 129th House of Representatives district =

American legislative district

Connecticut's 129th State House of Representatives district
Representative
| Steven Stafstrom; D |

Connecticut's 129th House of Representatives district elects one member of the Connecticut House of Representatives. It encompasses parts of Bridgeport and has been represented by Democrat Steven Stafstrom since 2015.

== List of representatives ==
List of Representatives from Connecticut's 129th State House District
| Representative | Party | Years | District home | Note |
|---|---|---|---|---|
| John W. Hughes | Republican | 1967–1971 | Stratford | Seat created |
| William J. Smyth | Republican | 1971–1973 | Stratford | |
| Margaret E. Morton | Democratic | 1973–1981 | Bridgeport | |
| Thomas K. Coble | Democratic | 1981–1983 | Bridgeport | |
| Lee Samowitz | Democratic | 1983–1985 | Bridgeport | |
| Casey Daly | Republican | 1985–1987 | Bridgeport | |
| Lee Samowitz | Democratic | 1987–2003 | Bridgeport | |
| Robert T. Keeley Jr. | Democratic | 2003–2009 | Bridgeport | |
| Auden Grogins | Democratic | 2009–2015 | Bridgeport | Reelected in 2014, but resigned before taking oath of office after being appointed to the Connecticut Superior Court |
| Steven Stafstrom | Democratic | 2015– | Bridgeport | Elected in special election |

== Recent elections ==
=== 2020 ===
2020 Connecticut State House of Representatives election, District 129
| Party | Candidate | Votes | % |
|---|---|---|---|
| Democratic | Steven Stafstrom (incumbent) | 5,690 | 77.08 |
| Republican | Helene S. Kouassi | 1,502 | 20.35 |
| Petitioning | Robert E. Halstead | 190 | 2.57 |
| Total votes | | 7,382 | 100.00 |
| Democratic hold | | | |

=== 2018 ===
2018 Connecticut House of Representatives election, District 129
| Party | Candidate | Votes | % |
|---|---|---|---|
| Democratic | Steven Stafstrom (Incumbent) | 4,507 | 82.2 |
| Republican | Vallorie Clark | 976 | 17.8 |
| Total votes | | 5,483 | 100.00 |
| Democratic hold | | | |

=== 2016 ===
2016 Connecticut House of Representatives election, District 129
| Party | Candidate | Votes | % |
|---|---|---|---|
| Democratic | Steven Stafstrom (Incumbent) | 5,181 | 79.37 |
| Republican | Peter Perillo | 1,347 | 20.63 |
| Total votes | | 6,528 | 100.00 |
| Democratic hold | | | |

=== 2015 special ===
2015 Connecticut House of Representatives elections, District 129
| Party | Candidate | Votes | % |
|---|---|---|---|
| Democratic | Steven Stafstrom | 776 | 44.5 |
| Republican | Enrique Torres | 720 | 41.3 |
| Nonpartisan | Robert T. Keely Jr. | 154 | 8.8 |
| Nonpartisan | Robert E. Halstead | 48 | 2.8 |
| Nonpartisan | Hector A. Diaz | 45 | 2.6 |
| Total votes | | 6,528 | 100.00 |
| Democratic hold | | | |

=== 2014 ===
2014 Connecticut House of Representatives election, District 129
| Party | Candidate | Votes | % |
|---|---|---|---|
| Democratic | Auden Grogins (Incumbent) | 3,149 | 100.00 |
| Total votes | | 3,149 | 100.00 |
| Democratic hold | | | |

=== 2012 ===
2012 Connecticut House of Representatives election, District 129
| Party | Candidate | Votes | % |
|---|---|---|---|
| Democratic | Auden Grogins (Incumbent) | 4,934 | 83.1 |
| Republican | John Slater | 1,000 | 16.9 |
| Total votes | | 5,934 | 100.00 |
| Democratic hold | | | |
