= Alvin Penn =

American politician (1949–2003)

Member of the Connecticut State Senate from the 23rd district
- In office January 6, 1993 – February 14, 2003
- Preceded by: Margaret E. Morton
- Succeeded by: Ernie Newton

Personal details
- Born: January 16, 1949 Cleveland, Ohio, U.S.
- Died: February 14, 2003 (aged 54) Branford, Connecticut, U.S.
- Party: Democratic

Alvin Penn (January 16, 1949 – February 14, 2003) was an American politician who served in the Connecticut State Senate from the 23rd district from 1993 until his death in 2003.

He died on February 14, 2003, in Branford, Connecticut at age 54.
