= University of Hartford =

Private university in West Hartford, Connecticut, U.S.

Coordinates: 41°48′03″N 72°42′50″W

- Motto: Ad humanitatem
- Motto in English: "For Humanity"
- Type: Private university
- Established: 1957; 69 years ago
- Accreditation: NECHE
- Academic affiliations: NAICU; Space-grant
- Endowment: $202.1 million (2025)
- President: Lawrence P. Ward
- Administrative staff: 718
- Students: 6,022 (fall 2024)
- Undergraduates: 4,229 (fall 2024)
- Postgraduates: 1,793 (fall 2024)
- Location: West Hartford, Connecticut, United States
- Campus: 350 acres (140 ha); Suburban
- Colors: Scarlet and white
- Nickname: Hawks
- Sporting affiliations: NCAA Division III (Note: Scheduled to reclassify to Division III no later than September 1, 2025.) Conference of New England
- Mascot: Howie the Hawk
- Website: hartford.edu

The University of Hartford (UHart) is a private university in West Hartford, Connecticut, United States. Its 350-acre (1.4 km^{2}) main campus extends into neighboring Hartford and Bloomfield. It enrolled approximately 6,000 undergraduate and graduate students as of fall 2024. The university is accredited by the New England Commission of Higher Education.

== History ==
The University of Hartford was chartered through the joining of the Hartford Art School, Hillyer College, and The Hartt School in 1957.

== Campus ==
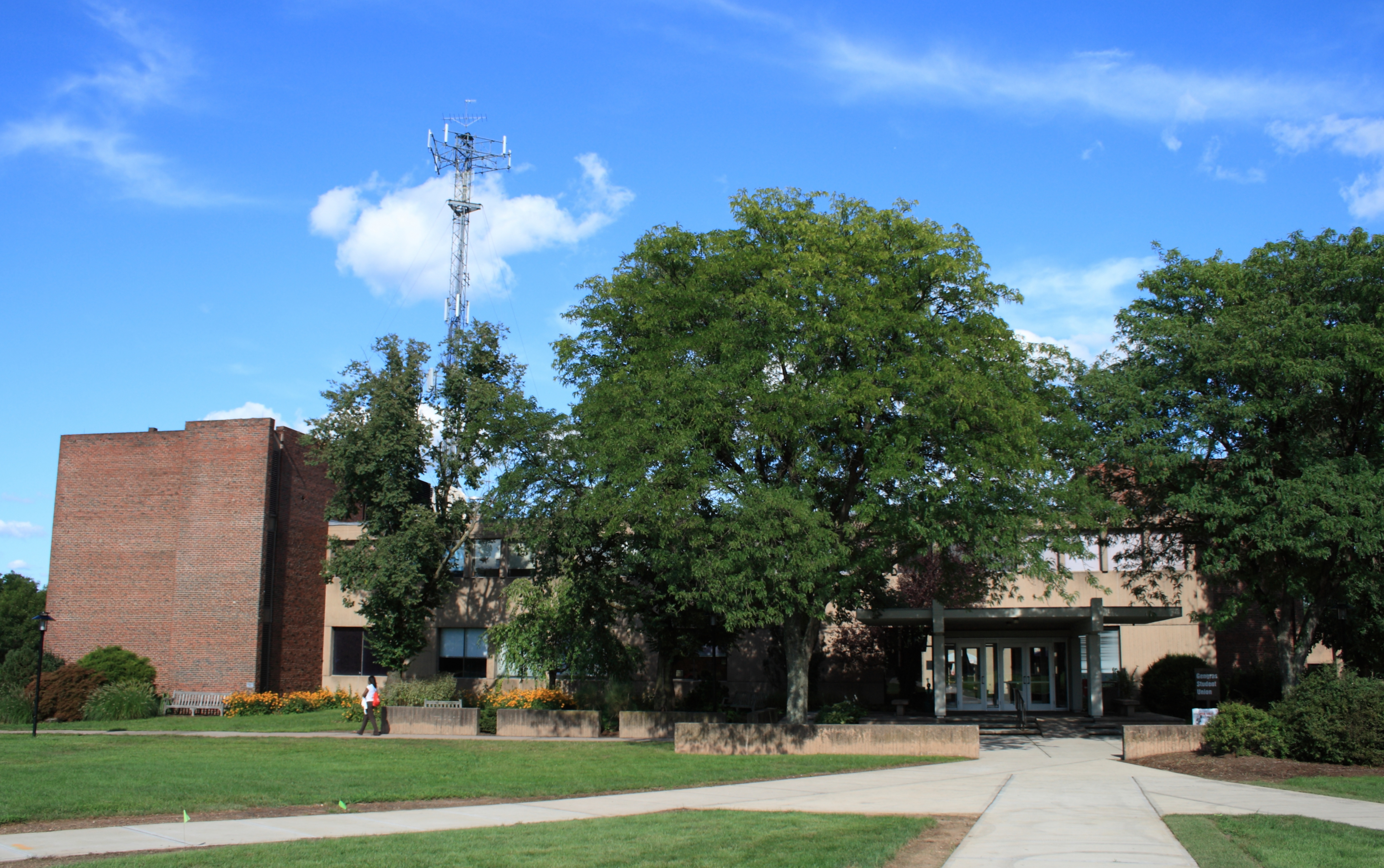
Gengras Student Union

Millard Auditorium

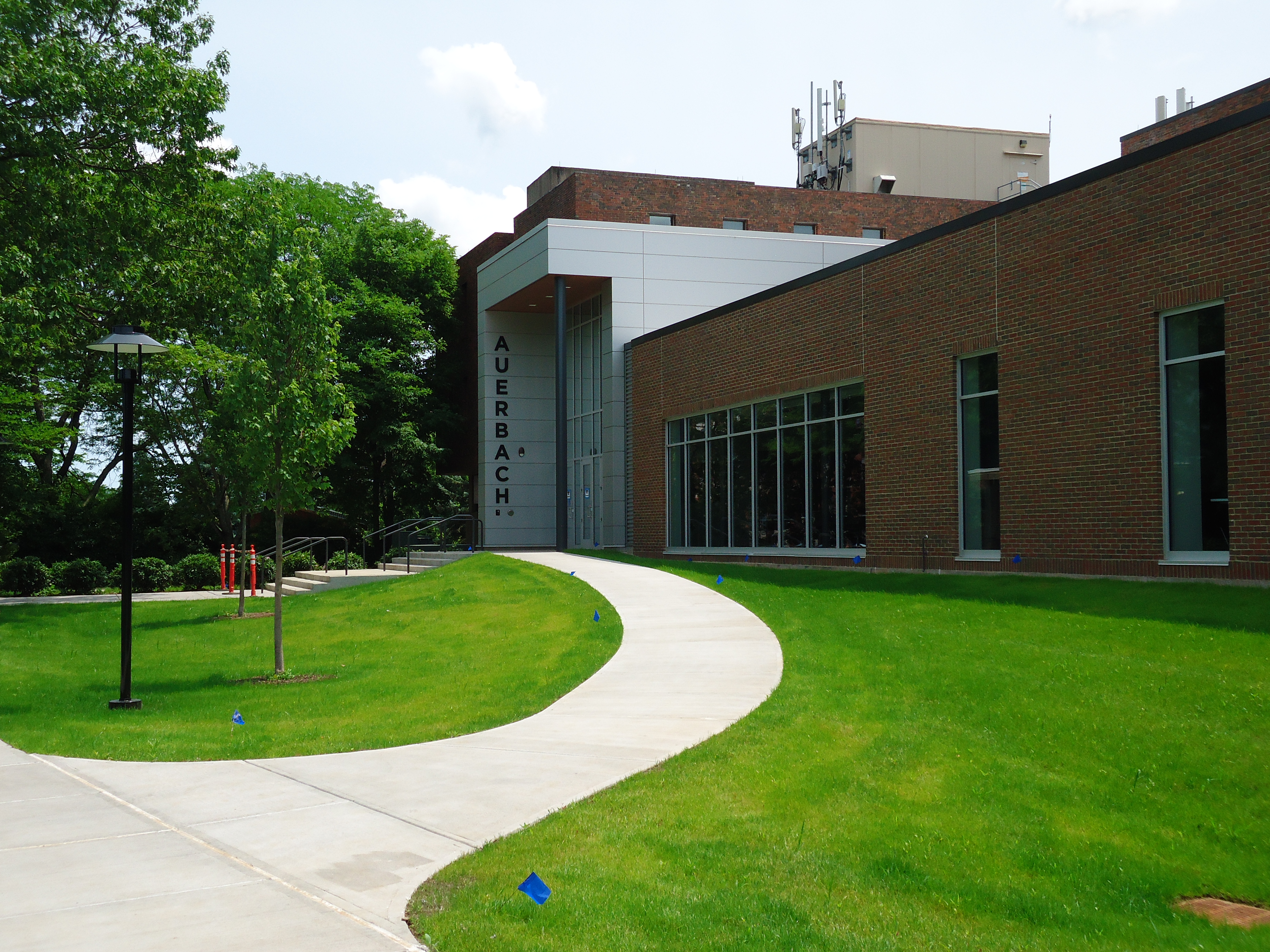
Auerbach Hall

Gengras Student Union houses the student government, the university post office, student organizations including the student newspaper The Informer and the Student Television Network (STN), a cafeteria, a convenience store, and the Gengras food court, featuring Einstein Bros. Bagels, Burger Studio, and Moe's. A major renovation of the Gengras Student Union began in early 2017.

Centrally located on campus, the Harry Jack Gray Center houses the Mortensen Library and the Allen Memorial Library. Also located here are the Joseloff Gallery, the university bookstore, the School of Communications, the Visual Communication Design Department, the Department of Architecture, WWUH (91.3 MHz FM) radio station, the Wilde Auditorium, the Kent McCray Television Studio, the Gray Conference Center, the Museum of Jewish Civilization, and the 1877 Club restaurant. It was the former home of the Museum of American Political Life, which housed the second largest collection of political memorabilia in the United States after the Smithsonian.

The Hartt School Complex is composed of Millard Auditorium, Paranov Hall, and O'Connell Hall, a one-story extension of Paronov Hall. Originally, Abrahms Hall was included in the Fuller Complex. A renovation of Millard Auditorium was completed in 2017.

Auerbach Hall is named after businesswoman Beatrice Fox Auerbach. It is one of the largest academic buildings on campus and is home to the Barney School of Business. During the 2018–19 academic year, Auerbach Hall underwent a major renovation which included a 10,000-square-foot addition for the Barney School including additional classrooms and a trading room.

Built in 1962, Hillyer Hall was the first classroom building on campus. Hillyer Hall is home to the College of Arts and Sciences, College of Education, and Hillyer College. In 2012, the Shaw Center was completed to provide additional classrooms and offices for Hillyer College. The building is named after John C. "Jay" Shaw (Class of '74) and wife Debi of Greenwich, who donated $1.5 million to the project.

University High School of Science and Engineering is a public magnet high school located on the east side of the campus. The University High School was established in 2004 as a partnership of the Hartford Public Schools, the University of Hartford, and the Capitol Region Education Council. It is based on the early college initiative mode: University High School students are able to earn college credits while they attend high school. The high school enrolls two hundred students, seventy percent of whom are from Hartford. The other thirty percent come from towns in central Connecticut. Students are selected through a lottery from a pool of applicants, as required by the state of Connecticut.

Dedicated in 2008, the Mort and Irma Handel Performing Arts Center is a 55,000-square-foot (5,100 m^{2})facility that is the instructional home for collegiate and Community Division students studying theatre, Musical Theater and Dance at the Hartt School. It contains five dance studios, four theatre rehearsal studios, three vocal studios, and two black box theatres, as well as faculty offices, a community room, and a cafe.

Chase Arena at Reich Family Pavilion is home to the men's and women's basketball teams and the women's volleyball team. Opened in 1990, the arena is named in honor of the Chase Family in West Hartford. Included in the building is the Mary Baker Stanley Pool and the university's athletic administration offices. Entertainment at the arena has included Girl Talk, Wale, and Ludacris. Past visiting politicians include Governor Dannel P. Malloy, former President Bill Clinton, and President Barack Obama.

Located 2 miles (3 km) west of downtown Hartford and once home to the Hartford College for Women, the Asylum Avenue Campus now includes academic classrooms and graduate student campus housing in fourteen townhouses and Johnson House. It contains a cafeteria, computer lab, and studio space. In 2022 the university sold the 10.4 acre campus for 1 million dollars.

== Organization and administration ==
List of university presidents:

1. Vincent B. Coffin (1959–1967)
2. Archibald M. Woodruff (1967–1977)
3. Stephen Joel Trachtenberg (1977–1988)
4. Humphrey Tonkin (1989–1998)
5. Walter Harrison (1998–2017)
6. Gregory S. Woodward (2017–2023)
7. Stephen Mulready (2023–2024)
8. Lawrence P. Ward (2024–present)

== Academics ==
Academic rankings

National
- Forbes: 542
- U.S. News & World Report: 301
- Washington Monthly: 434

Global
- QS: 801–1000

National Program Rankings
Program	Ranking
Engineering	78
Nursing	186

The University of Hartford has fewer than 6,000 full-time and part-time graduate and undergraduate students. The university offers 82 bachelor's degree programs, 10 associate degrees, 28 graduate degrees, and 7 certificates or diplomas. The student-faculty ratio is 9:1. The university's academics are organized into seven schools and colleges.

== Student life ==
Student body composition as of September 22, 2023
Race and ethnicity	Total
White	51%
Hispanic	17%
Black	16%
Asian	4%
Foreign national	3%
Other (Note: Other consists of Multiracial Americans & those who prefer to not say.)	2%
Economic diversity
Low-income (Note: The percentage of students who received an income-based federal Pell grant intended for low-income students.)	35%
Affluent (Note: The percentage of students who are a part of the American middle class at the bare minimum.)	65%

A cappella groups at the University of Hartford are governed by the A Cappella Coalition and hold auditions at the beginning of each year for new members. Groups include L'shir, Hawkapella, Uharmonies and HartAttack

Launched in the spring of 2000, the Music for a Change benefit concert series raises money for Greater Hartford charities and nonprofit organizations. Headliners have included Arlo Guthrie, Alison Krauss and Union Station, Art Garfunkel, Aztec Two-Step, Citizen Cope, Dionne Warwick, George Winston, Jonathan Edwards, Kris Kristofferson, Marc Cohn, Pat Metheny, Richie Havens, Shawn Colvin, Susan Tedeschi, Tom Paxton, Tom Rush, The Wailers, and Wynton Marsalis.

There are several fraternities and sororities on campus.

Fraternities	Sororities	Former Organizations	
Alpha Epsilon Pi; Alpha Sigma Phi; Delta Sigma Phi; Lambda Theta Phi; Sigma Alpha Epsilon; Sigma Nu; Theta Chi	Alpha Xi Delta; Delta Gamma; Delta Zeta; Phi Mu; Sigma Delta Tau	Alpha Epsilon Phi; Delta Phi Epsilon; Phi Delta Theta; Phi Iota Alpha; Phi Kappa Sigma; Phi Sigma Kappa; Pi Lambda Phi	Sigma Alpha Mu; Sigma Phi Epsilon; Sigma Kappa; Tau Kappa Epsilon; Tau Epsilon Phi; Zeta Beta Tau; Sigma Kappa; Sigma Alpha Epsilon Pi

=== Media ===
Founded on February 2, 1974, WSAM is the university's only student-run radio station. It streams its radio shows online through Mixlr. It hosts annual concerts such as Live from the Lawn every opening weekend and a Halloween show every Halloween weekend.

With a legacy from The Hillyer Callboard, the student newspaper of Hillyer College, dating from the 1920s, the Informer is the official student newspaper of the University of Hartford. It is published weekly.

The Student Television Network is a completely student-run station that broadcasts on stn2.tv and their YouTube page. Founded by then-graduate student Chuck King and a group of interested students in 1993, STN became a popular student organization. Though separate from the School of Communication, it provides relevant experience for students pursuing careers in television. STN started its weekly news program broadcast, "STN Channel 2 News," on February 9, 1993. Currently, new broadcasts are live once a week and then played throughout the week. In addition to weekly news broadcasts, STN produces and broadcasts several live Hartford Hawks sports productions throughout the year, and hosts a number of other student-created programs.

== Athletics ==
Hartford participates in the NCAA Division III in the Conference of New England. The university fields 20 varsity sports. They formerly participated in the Division I America East Conference until the 2023–4 academic year.

In 2021, the University of Hartford announced it will begin the process to move all of its 17 athletic programs from Division I to Division III. Students and alumni from the University of Hartford attempted to sue the university, claiming that the university "reneged on its commitment" to the student-athletes. The university filed its intent to move to Division III in January 2022 and is expected to become a member of DIII no later than September 1, 2025, unless the move is halted in the courts.

=== Men's sports ===
- Baseball
- Basketball
- Cross country
- Golf
- Lacrosse
- Soccer
- Indoor and outdoor track & field
- Tennis

=== Women's sports ===
- Basketball
- Cross country
- Field hockey
- Golf
- Lacrosse
- Soccer
- Softball
- Indoor and outdoor track & field
- Tennis
- Volleyball

== Notable alumni ==
Currently the university has over 94,000 alumni worldwide.

- Kenny Adeleke (born 1983), basketball player
- Jeff Bagwell baseball player
- Vin Baker, basketball player
- Robert Black (bassist)
- William Bridgeo, state representative
- Leo Brouwer, musician
- Kathleen Clark, playwright
- David Cordani, CEO of Cigna
- Steve Davis, jazz trombonist
- Mark Dion, artist
- Jim Ford, actor and stuntman
- Henry Genga, state representative
- A. J. Hammer, television host, radio personality
- Jonas Hampton, distance runner
- Liane Hansen, radio personality
- Jack Hardy, singer and songwriter
- Johnathan Lee Iverson, circus performer
- Wilfred X. Johnson, first black Connecticut state legislator
- Jerry Kelly, professional golfer, PGA Tour
- Tim Leissner, former Goldman Sachs investment banker and convicted felon
- Erik Mariñelarena, filmmaker
- William J. Murphy, former Speaker of the House of the State of Rhode Island
- Sean Newcomb baseball player
- Peter Niedmann, composer
- Chuck Pagano, chief technology officer of ESPN
- Tim Petrovic, golfer
- Joseph M. Suggs Jr. (B.S. 1978), mayor of Bloomfield and Connecticut State Treasurer (1993–1995)
- Marlene Maheu, clinical psychologist and author of Infidelity on the Internet
- Raffaella Petrini, President of the Pontifical Commission for Vatican City State and President of the Governatorate of the Vatican City State (Head of State of Vatican City, 2025-present); former Secretary General of the Governorate of Vatican City State (2021-2025)
- Dionne Warwick (born 1940), singer

=== Hartford Art School ===
- Louis Orr (1876–1966), artist
- Edward Dugmore (1915–1996)

=== Hillyer College ===
- Seymour Itzkoff, professor, researcher in intelligence
