= Conway Barbour =

American politician

Conway Barbour (c. 1818–1876) was held as a slave, worked as a ship steward, became a businessman, and lawyer. He served as a state legislator in Arkansas and was elected to the Arkansas House of Representatives in 1871. Professor Victoria L. Harrison wrote about him in the 2018 book Fight Like a Tiger: Conway Barbour and the Challenges of the Black Middle Class in Nineteenth-Century America published by Southern Illinois University Press.

A Republican, he represented Lafayette County, Arkansas in the Arkansas House.

He died in Lake Village, Arkansas.

He and two other African Americans who represented Lafayette County, Marshall M. Murray and Monroe Hawkins, are commemorated by a historical marker in Stamps, Arkansas.

== See also ==
- African American officeholders from the end of the Civil War until before 1900
