= Sheila Baker =

American politician

Member of the Connecticut House of Representatives from the 124th district
- In office 1987–1989
- Preceded by: Clement Young
- Succeeded by: Ernie Newton

Personal details
- Party: Democratic

Sheila A. Baker is an American politician who served in the Connecticut House of Representatives from 1987 to 1989, representing the 124th district as a Democrat. She lived in Bridgeport during her tenure.
