= Connecticut's 124th House of Representatives district =

American legislative district

Connecticut's 124th State House of Representatives district
Representative
| Andre Baker; D |

Connecticut's 124th House of Representatives district elects one member of the Connecticut House of Representatives. It encompasses parts of Bridgeport and has been represented by Democrat Andre Baker since 2015.

== List of representatives ==
List of representatives from Connecticut's 124th State House district
| Representative | Party | Years | District home | Note |
|---|---|---|---|---|
| Ralph J. Brown | Republican | 1967–1969 | Easton | Seat created |
| Thomas D. Halliwell | Republican | 1969–1971 | Easton | |
| George A. Johnson Jr. | Republican | 1971–1973 | Monroe | |
| David J. Sullivan Jr. | Republican | 1973–1975 | Bridgeport | |
| Philip J. Leeney | Democratic | 1975–1981 | Bridgeport | |
| Casey Daly | Republican | 1981–1983 | Bridgeport | |
| Clement Young | Democratic | 1983–1987 | Bridgeport | |
| Sheila Baker | Democratic | 1987–1989 | Bridgeport | |
| Ernie Newton | Democratic | 1989–2003 | Bridgeport | Elected to the Connecticut State Senate |
| Charles Donald Clemons Jr. | Democratic | 2003–2015 | Bridgeport | |
| Andre Baker | Democratic | 2015– | Bridgeport | |

== Recent elections ==
=== 2020 ===
2020 Connecticut State House of Representatives election, District 124
| Party | Candidate | Votes | % |
|---|---|---|---|
| Democratic | Andre Baker (incumbent) | 5,337 | 82.78 |
| Republican | Jasmin Sanchez | 961 | 14.91 |
| Independent Party | Wilfredo Martinez | 149 | 2.31 |
| Total votes | | 6,447 | 100.00 |
| Democratic hold | | | |

=== 2018 ===
2018 Connecticut House of Representatives election, District 124
| Party | Candidate | Votes | % |
|---|---|---|---|
| Democratic | Andre Baker (Incumbent) | 3,971 | 89.7 |
| Republican | Jose Quiroga | 458 | 10.3 |
| Total votes | | 4,429 | 100.00 |
| Democratic hold | | | |

=== 2016 ===
2016 Connecticut House of Representatives election, District 124
| Party | Candidate | Votes | % |
|---|---|---|---|
| Democratic | Andre Baker (Incumbent) | 5,301 | 89.73 |
| Republican | Jose Quiroga | 607 | 10.27 |
| Total votes | | 5,908 | 100.00 |
| Democratic hold | | | |

=== 2014 ===
2014 Connecticut House of Representatives election, District 124
| Party | Candidate | Votes | % |
|---|---|---|---|
| Democratic | Andre Baker | 2,721 | 100.00 |
| Total votes | | 2,721 | 100.00 |
| Democratic hold | | | |

=== 2012 ===
2012 Connecticut House of Representatives election, District 124
| Party | Candidate | Votes | % |
|---|---|---|---|
| Democratic | Charles Clemons (Incumbent) | 5,417 | 92.5 |
| Republican | Jose Quiroga | 442 | 7.5 |
| Total votes | | 5,859 | 100.00 |
| Democratic hold | | | |
