= Brian Anderson =

Brian Anderson may refer to:

- Brian Anderson (electrical engineer) (born 1941), Australian professor
- Brian Anderson (British boxer) (born 1961), British boxer
- Brian Anderson (Irish boxer) (born 1939), Irish boxer
- Brian Anderson (rugby union), Scottish rugby union referee
- Brian Anderson (sportscaster) (born 1971), sports announcer for the Milwaukee Brewers and Turner Sports
- Brian Anderson (paediatrician), New Zealand anaesthesiologist awarded CNZM in the 2024 New Year Honours
- Brian Anderson (pitcher) (born 1972), former baseball pitcher, current broadcaster for the Tampa Bay Rays
- Brian Anderson (outfielder) (born 1982), baseball outfielder
- Brian Anderson (skateboarder) (born 1976), professional skateboarder
- Brian Anderson (third baseman) (born 1993), baseball third baseman
- Brian C. Anderson (born 1961), American writer and editor

== See also ==
- Bryan Anderson (disambiguation)
