= Wilfred X. Johnson House =

Historic house in Connecticut, United States

- U.S. National Register of Historic Places
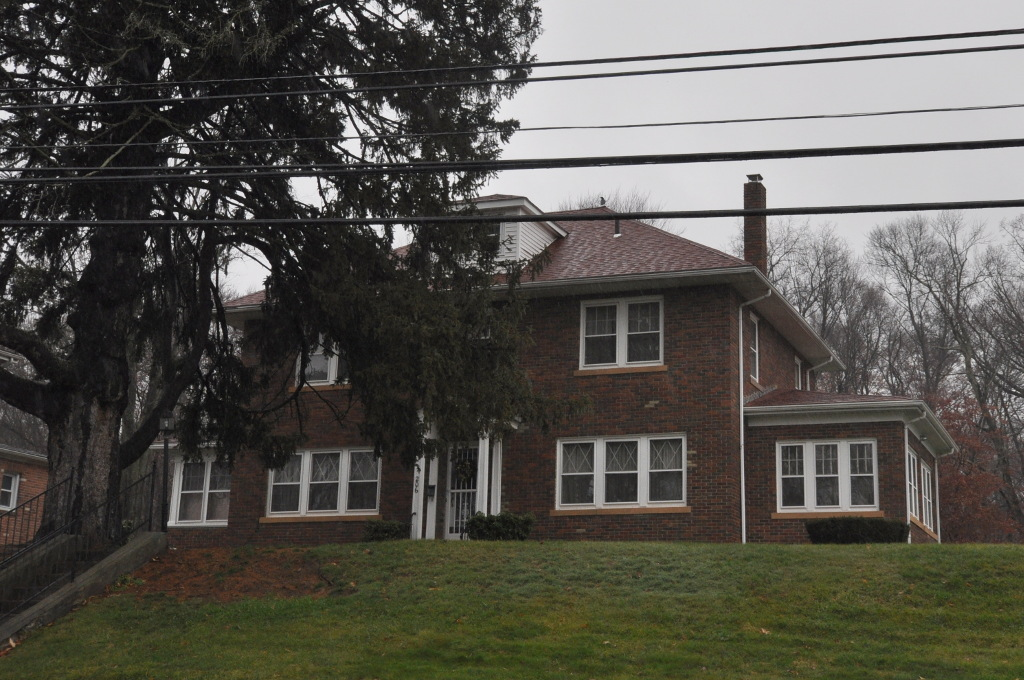

- Location within Connecticut Location within the United States
- Location: 206 Tower Avenue, Hartford, Connecticut
- Coordinates: 41°47′58″N 72°40′22″W
- Area: less than one acre
- Built: 1928
- Architectural style: Colonial Revival
- NRHP reference No.: 94000765
- Added to NRHP: July 31, 1994

The Wilfred X. Johnson House is a historic house at 206 Tower Avenue in Hartford, Connecticut. Built in 1928, it was the home from 1966 until his death the home of Wilfred X. Johnson (1920–1972), the state's first African-American state representative. The property was listed on the National Register of Historic Places in 1994.

== Description and history ==
The Wilfred X. Johnson House is located on Hartford's north side, on the north side of Tower Avenue between Barbour and Hampton Streets. The property's rear abuts the city's Keney Park. The house is 2 1/2 stories in height, built out of brick with wooden trim. It is covered by a hip roof that is pierced on the front by a shed-roof dormer. Single-story wings extend to either side of the main block. The front facade is three bays wide, with a center entrance sheltered by a gabled porch with cove ceiling. The entrance is flanked by pilasters that match the posts supporting the porch. The bays on either side of the entrance have tripled sash windows, while the upper floor bays have a 2-1-2 pattern of window grouping. The flanking wings each have tripled sash windows. Some of the windows retain their original diamond-pane sashes. The interior of the house follows a center hall plan.

The house was built in 1928, and is a fairly typical example of Colonial Revival architecture built at that time. In 1966 it was purchased by Wilfred and Gertrude Johnson.

== Wilfred Johnson ==
Wilfred X. Johnson, a native of Georgia, came to Hartford as a child with his parents, and was locally educated. He took a position as a messenger boy at the Hartford National Bank, rising to become the state's first African-American bank teller in 1955. He was active in the local Democratic Party, and won election to the state legislature in 1958, the first African-American to do so. Gertrude Johnson was also active the party, working to achieve racial balance in the city's schools.

== See also ==
- National Register of Historic Places listings in Hartford, Connecticut
