= Marlene Maheu =

American clinical psychologist

Marlene M. Maheu
- Born: United States
- Occupation: Psychologist

Academic background
- Education: University of Hartford; California School of Professional Psychology

Marlene M. Maheu is an American clinical psychologist who is the author of Infidelity on the Internet.

Maheu founded and is currently the Executive Director of the Telebehavioral Health Institute (TBHI), now known as Telehealth.org. Maheu is the founder of the Journal for Technology in Behavioral Science (JTiBS). She has published more than 50 journal articles and books on telehealth.

== Education ==
Maheu graduated summa cum laude from the University of Hartford with a BA in Psychology. She graduated from the California School of Professional Psychology in San Diego, California with both a Master of Arts and PhD (1985) in Clinical Psychology. Maheu has also served as an editor for the peer-reviewed journals Professional Psychology: Research and Practice and Psychological Services, both of which are published by the American Psychological Association. From 2011 to 2015, Maheu has served as a Faculty Associate at the Cummings Graduate Institute for Behavioral Health Studies at Arizona State University. Maheu is currently based in San Diego, California.

== Career ==
Maheu has worked in telehealth as one of her primary professional focus areas. She has served on several task forces, committees, and work groups to develop telehealth-related standards and guidelines for the American Telemedicine Association, the American Psychological Association, and the American Counseling Association.

== Memberships ==
Maheu is a member of the American Psychological Association. She is also a member of the American Telemedicine Association, American Counseling Association, California Psychological Association, and various other associations.

== Selected publications ==
Selected publications by Maheu include the following.

=== Articles ===
- Hertlein, Katherine M.; Drude, Kenneth P.; Hilty, Donald M.; Maheu, Marlene M. (2021-02-18). "Toward proficiency in telebehavioral health: applying interprofessional competencies in couple and family therapy". Journal of Marital and Family Therapy. 47 (2). Wiley: 359–374. doi:10.1111/jmft.12496. ISSN 0194-472X. PMID 33600613. S2CID 231964007.
- Drude, Kenneth P.; Hertlien, Katherine M.; Maheu, Marlene M.; Hilty, Donald M.; Wall, Karen (2019-08-14). "Telebehavioral Health Competencies in Interprofessional Education and Training: a Pathway to Interprofessional Practice". Journal of Technology in Behavioral Science. 5 (1). Springer Science and Business Media LLC: 30–39. doi:10.1007/s41347-019-00112-y. ISSN 2366-5963. S2CID 256552037.
- Hilty, Donald M.; Randhawa, Karan; Maheu, Marlene M.; McKean, Alastair J. S.; Pantera, Richard; Mishkind, Matthew C.; Rizzo, Albert “Skip” (2020-02-20). "A Review of Telepresence, Virtual Reality, and Augmented Reality Applied to Clinical Care". Journal of Technology in Behavioral Science. 5 (2). Springer Science and Business Media LLC: 178–205. doi:10.1007/s41347-020-00126-x. ISSN 2366-5963. S2CID 256556297.
- Maheu, Marlene M.; Drude, Kenneth P.; Hertlein, Katherine M.; Hilty, Donald M. (2018-10-03). "A Framework of Interprofessional Telebehavioral Health Competencies: Implementation and Challenges Moving Forward". Academic Psychiatry. 42 (6). Springer Science and Business Media LLC: 825–833. doi:10.1007/s40596-018-0988-1. ISSN 1042-9670. PMID 30284147. S2CID 52914382.
- Hilty, Donald M.; Maheu, Marlene M.; Drude, Kenneth P.; Hertlein, Katherine M. (2018-11-13). "The Need to Implement and Evaluate Telehealth Competency Frameworks to Ensure Quality Care across Behavioral Health Professions". Academic Psychiatry. 42 (6). Springer Science and Business Media LLC: 818–824. doi:10.1007/s40596-018-0992-5. ISSN 1042-9670. PMID 30426453.
- Glueckauf, Robert L.; Maheu, Marlene M.; Drude, Kenneth P.; Wells, Brittny A.; Wang, Yuxia; Gustafson, David J.; Nelson, Eve-Lynn (2018). "Survey of psychologists' telebehavioral health practices: Technology use, ethical issues, and training needs". Professional Psychology: Research and Practice. 49 (3). American Psychological Association (APA): 205–219. doi:10.1037/pro0000188. ISSN 1939-1323. S2CID 85527195.
- Shore, Jay H.; Mishkind, Matt C.; Bernard, Jordana; Doarn, Charles R.; Bell, Iverson; Bhatla, Rajiv; Brooks, Elizabeth; Caudill, Robert; Cohn, Ellen R.; Delphin, Barthold J.; Eppolito, Antonio; Fortney, John; Friedl, Karl; Hirsch, Phil; Jordan, Patricia J.; Kim, Thomas J.; Luxton, David D.; Lynch, Michael D.; Maheu, Marlene M.; McVeigh, Francis L.; Nelson, Eve-Lynn; Officer, Chuck; O'Neil, Patrick T.; Roberts, Lisa J.; Rye, Colleen; Turvey, Carolyn; Vo, Alexander (2014). "A Lexicon of Assessment and Outcome Measures for Telemental Health". Telemedicine and e-Health. 20 (3). Mary Ann Liebert Inc: 282–292. doi:10.1089/tmj.2013.0357. ISSN 1530-5627. PMID 24476192.
- Hilty, Donald M.; Maheu, Marlene M.; Drude, Kenneth P.; Hertlein, Katherine M. (2018-11-13). "The Need to Implement and Evaluate Telehealth Competency Frameworks to Ensure Quality Care across Behavioral Health Professions". Academic Psychiatry. 42 (6). Springer Science and Business Media LLC: 818–824. doi:10.1007/s40596-018-0992-5. ISSN 1042-9670. PMID 30426453.
- Turvey, Carolyn; Coleman, Mirean; Dennison, Oran; Drude, Kenneth; Goldenson, Mark; Hirsch, Phil; Jueneman, Robert; Kramer, Greg M.; Luxton, David D.; Maheu, Marlene M.; Malik, Tania S.; Mishkind, Matt C.; Rabinowitz, Terry; Roberts, Lisa J.; Sheeran, Thomas; Shore, Jay H.; Shore, Peter; van Heeswyk, Frank; Wregglesworth, Brian; Yellowlees, Peter; Zucker, Murray L.; Krupinski, Elizabeth A.; Bernard, Jordana (2013). "ATA Practice Guidelines for Video-Based Online Mental Health Services". Telemedicine and e-Health. 19 (9). Mary Ann Liebert Inc: 722–730. doi:10.1089/tmj.2013.9989. ISSN 1530-5627. PMID 23909884.
- Maheu, M. M., and McMenamin, J. (2013, March 28). Telepsychiatry: The perils of using Skype.

=== Books ===
Some of Maheu's books are:

- ‌Maheu, M. M., Drude, K., Merrill, C., Callan, J. E., & Hilty, D. M. (2020). Telebehavioral health foundations in theory & practice for graduate learners. Cognella.
- Maheu, Marlene (2017). Career Paths in Telemental Health (in Dutch). Cham: Springer International Publishing Imprint Springer. ISBN 978-3-319-23735-0. OCLC 974650164.
- Luxton, David (2016). A practitioner's guide to telemental health : how to conduct legal, ethical, and evidence-based telepractice. Washington, DC: American Psychological Association. ISBN 978-1-4338-2227-8. OCLC 952345492.
- Maheu, Marlene (2005). The mental health professional and the new technologies : a handbook for practice today. Mahwah, N.J: Lawrence Erlbaum Associates. ISBN 978-0-8058-3988-3. OCLC 56779863.
- Maheu, Marlene (2001). E-Health, telehealth, and telemedicine : a guide to start-up and success. San Francisco: Jossey-Bass. ISBN 978-0-7879-4420-9. OCLC 48138432.
