= William Webb Ferguson =

American politician (1857–1910)

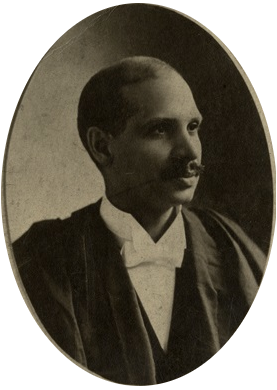

Member of the Michigan House of Representatives from the Wayne County 1st district
- In office January 1, 1893 – December 31, 1896

Personal details
- Born: May 22, 1857 Detroit, Michigan
- Died: March 30, 1910 (aged 52) Detroit, Michigan
- Resting place: Elmwood Cemetery
- Party: Republican
- Spouse: Emma V. Pelham
- Children: 3
- Education: Detroit High School
- Profession: printer, realtor, lawyer, politician

William Webb Ferguson (May 22, 1857 – March 30, 1910) was the first African-American man elected to the Michigan House of Representatives.

== Early life ==
Ferguson was born in Detroit, Michigan, to Joseph and Martha Ferguson. His father, Joseph Ferguson, was a medical doctor. In 1876, Ferguson graduated with honors from Detroit High School as the first African-American child to attend public high school in Detroit. In 1883, he founded the Ferguson Printing Company.

== Personal life ==
Ferguson married Emma Virginia Pelham who was born in Petersburg, Virginia, on August 20, 1878. Together, they had three children, Mattie, who died at the age of two, and Meta and Norine, who lived into adulthood.

== State supreme court case ==
After discrimination faced in a restaurant on August 15, 1889, Ferguson sued the restaurant manager, Edward G. Gies, in Wayne County Circuit Court. After losing this case, he appealed it to the Michigan Supreme Court in 1890 and won, the first case of racial discrimination in the state of Michigan.

== Political career ==
Ferguson was sworn in as member of the Michigan House of Representatives from Wayne County 1st district on January 4, 1893. He served until December 31, 1896. Ferguson was a member of the Republican Party.

== Death ==
Ferguson died on March 30, 1910, in Detroit. He was interred on April 2, 1910, at the Elmwood Cemetery.

== Legacy ==
On February 28, 2018, a portrait of Ferguson painted by Joshua Adam Risner was unveiled at the Michigan State Capitol by the Michigan Legislative Black Caucus due to a bill introduced by State Representative Sheldon Neeley.
