= Kenneth R. Wykle =

American Army officer (born 1941)

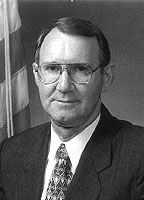

Administrator of the Federal Highway Administration
- In office December 2, 1997 – September 4, 2001
- President: Bill Clinton (1997–2001); George W. Bush (2001)
- Preceded by: Rodney E. Slater
- Succeeded by: Mary E. Peters

Personal details
- Born: October 20, 1941 (age 84) Ronceverte, West Virginia, U.S.

Lt. Gen. Kenneth Richard Wykle (born October 20, 1941) is a retired American Army officer and civil servant who served as Administrator of the Federal Highway Administration under the second Clinton administration.

Wykle joined the United States Army in 1963. After assignments in the United States and overseas, he was appointed Deputy Commander in Chief of the U.S. Transportation Command, the unified command for the Army, Navy, and Air Force mobility. He achieved the rank of Lieutenant General in 1993, and retired two years later.

Returning to public service as Administrator in late 1997, Wykle worked to secure passage of the Transportation Equity Act for the 21st century (TEA-21), which increased the Federal-aid Highway Program to record funding levels in the $30 billion range. He implemented TEA-21 rapidly, with emphasis on increased efficiency of program delivery.

In addition, Wykle championed Intelligent Transportation Systems and the application of technology as the Interstate Highway Program. With his background in military logistics, Wykle encouraged enhanced efficiency for freight shipments by road and through improved intermodal connectors. He also encouraged advances in pavement and bridge technology, as well as safety.

Military offices
Preceded by James D. Starling	Deputy Commander-in-Chief of the United States Transportation Command; 1993–1995	Succeeded by Hubert G. Smith
