= William Townsend (Arkansas politician) =

American politician and optometrist (1914–2005)

William H. Townsend

Member of the Arkansas House of Representatives
- In office 1973–1997

Personal details
- Born: July 14, 1914 West Point, Mississippi, US
- Died: September 15, 2005 (aged 91) Little Rock, Arkansas, US
- Party: Democratic
- Education: Tuskegee University, Illinois College of Optometry
- Occupation: Politician, optometrist

William H. Townsend (July 30, 1914 – September 15, 2005) was an American politician, civil rights activist, and optometrist who was one of the first African Americans to serve in the Arkansas State Legislature since the Reconstruction era. He was elected to the Arkansas House of Representatives as a Democrat representing Little Rock in 1972 and went on to serve twelve terms in office until 1997.

== Early life and education ==
Townsend was born on July 30, 1914, in West Point, Mississippi, and raised in Earle, Arkansas. He earned a BS in agriculture from the Tuskegee Institute in 1941. He enlisted in the United States Army during World War II and while serving overseas studied at the University of Nottingham. He earned a Purple Heart after sustaining a shrapnel wound to his knee. During his military service, Townsend was promoted to the rank of sergeant. After returning home, he studied premed at Howard University and transferred to the Northern Illinois College of Optometry, from which he received his doctoral degree in optometry in May 1950.

== Civil rights activism ==
Soon after graduating, Townsend established an optometry clinic in Little Rock, Arkansas. He was the first African American licensed to practice optometry in Arkansas, passing the state's optometric state board examination in August 1950.

During the 1950s, Townsend became active in the civil rights movement, becoming a founding member of the Arkansas Council on Human Relations (ACHR), formed in 1954, and the Council on Community Affairs (COCA), formed in 1961. Both organizations campaigned to desegregate public schools, facilities, and businesses, with COCA driving the desegregation of downtown Little Rock in 1963. Townsend personally participated in sit-ins at Little Rock restaurants during the early 1960s. In 1966, he became chair of the Arkansas Voter Education Project, a statewide program to register African American voters. In 1972, he became chair of the Arkansas Council on Human Relations. He was a life member of the NAACP.

In 1962 and 1966, Townsend ran unsuccessfully for a seat on Little Rock's city council. In 1969, Governor Winthrop Rockefeller, a reformist Republican, nominated Townsend to serve on the state board of education, but the Arkansas Senate refused to confirm Townsend's appointment.

== Political career ==
In 1972, Townsend was elected to the Arkansas House of Representatives alongside Richard Mays and Henry Wilkins III, becoming the first African Americans to serve in the House since the Reconstruction era. (Jerry Jewell, a dentist and fellow COCA member, was elected to the Arkansas Senate that same year.) A Democrat, Townsend represented a Black-majority district of eastern and central Little Rock. He served twelve terms of office through 1997, declining to seek reelection in 1996 on advice from his doctors. He became vice chair of the House Education Committee by 1979 and chaired the House Aging and Legislative Affairs Committee starting in 1993. He sponsored bills that led to free kindergarten, minimum wages and benefits for school staff, rescindment of the state tax on prescription drugs for senior citizens, and recognition of Martin Luther King Jr. Day as a state holiday.

In addition to his political career, Townsend served on the boards of the Urban League, the Arkansas Enterprises for the Blind, the First National Bank of Little Rock, and the Arkansas Optometric Association. The optometric association named him Optometrist of the Year in 1981 and continues to award an annual student scholarship in his honor. Townsend was honored with a marker on the Arkansas Civil Rights Heritage Trail in 2013.

== Personal life and death ==
Townsend married Billye McNeely in 1952, and the couple had three daughters.

He died in Little Rock on September 15, 2005, at the age of 91. He was interred at the Arkansas State Veterans Cemetery in North Little Rock.
