= Steven Stafstrom =

American attorney and politician

Member of the Connecticut House of Representatives from the 129th district
- Incumbent
- Assumed office 2015
- Preceded by: Auden Grogins

Personal details
- Born: November 2, 1982 (age 43) Hartford, Connecticut, U.S.
- Party: Democratic
- Spouse: Christine Stafstrom
- Children: 2
- Education: Fairfield University (BA); Saint Louis University (JD)
- Website: Official website

Steven Stafstrom is an American attorney and politician serving as a member of the Connecticut House of Representatives from the 129th district. He was first elected to the chamber in a special election on February 24, 2015.

== Early life and education ==
Stafstrom was raised in Orange, Connecticut. He received his Bachelor of Arts degree from Fairfield University in 2005. He then received his J.D. degree from the Saint Louis University School of Law in 2008, where he was an articles editor of the Saint Louis University Law Journal.

== Career ==
As a law student, Stafstrom was a clerk in the office of the Connecticut attorney general. Since 2008, he has been a partner at the law firm of Pullman & Comley in Bridgeport, Connecticut. He currently serves at co-chair of the firm’s Litigation Department and leads its Real Estate and Environmental Litigation practice. He has been listed among the top 14 lawyers in Connecticut for commercial disputes by Legal 500 US City Elite guide and as a Moffly Media Top Lawyer in Fairfield County for Government and Administrative law. In 2024 American Law Media named him the New England Social Impact Award Winner.

In politics, Stafstrom was elected to the Bridgeport City Council in 2013 and the Connecticut House of Representatives in 2015. Since 2019, he has served as co-chair of the House Judiciary Committee. He was previously vice chair of the committee. As co-chair of the House Judiciary Committee, Stafstrom has advocated for gun control and statewide criminal justice reform.
