= Casey Daly =

American politician (died 1992)

Member of the Connecticut House of Representatives from the 124th district
- In office 1981–1983
- Preceded by: Philip J. Leeney
- Succeeded by: Clement Young

Member of the Connecticut House of Representatives from the 129th district
- In office 1985–1987
- Preceded by: Lee Samowitz
- Succeeded by: Lee Samowitz

Personal details
- Born: Carol Hodgdon; 1943 or 1944 Stamford, Connecticut, U.S.
- Died: July 19, 1992 (aged 48) Hartford, Connecticut, U.S.
- Party: Republican
- Children: 1

Carol "Casey" Daly (died July 19, 1992) was an American politician who served in the Connecticut House of Representatives. A Republican, Daly represented the 124th district from 1981 to 1983, and the 129th district from 1985 to 1987.
