= Geraldine W. Travis =

American politician

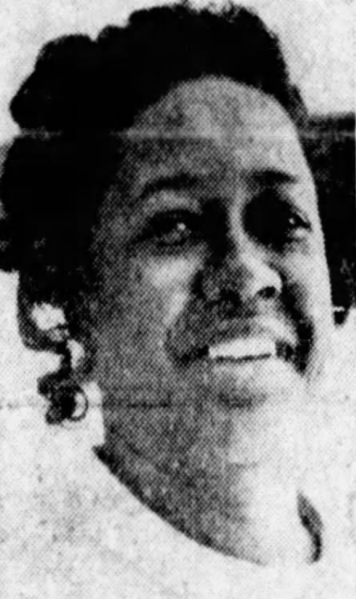

Member of the Montana House of Representatives from the 43rd district
- In office 1975–1977
- Succeeded by: Warren O'Keefe

Personal details
- Born: Geraldine Washington Travis; November 3, 1931 (age 94) Albany, Georgia, U.S.
- Party: Democratic
- Spouse: William Alexander Travis
- Children: 5
- Education: Xavier University of Louisiana

Geraldine Washington Travis (born September 3, 1931) is an American politician and activist who served in the Montana House of Representatives from the 43rd district as a member of the Democratic Party. She was the first black woman to serve in the Montana House of Representatives.

== Early life ==
Geraldine Washington Travis was born on September 3, 1931, in Albany, Georgia, to Joseph and Dorothy Washington. She was educated at Xavier University of Louisiana. In 1949, she married William Alexander Travis, with whom she would have five children, and would move throughout the country due to Travis being a member of the United States Air Force.

== Career ==
In 1967, Travis and her husband moved to the Malmstrom Air Force Base near Great Falls, Montana. She helped found the NAACP branch in Great Falls in 1968, and served as its secretary treasurer. During the 1960s, she served as president of the Cascade County Women's Political Caucus. She also founded chapters of the National Council of Negro Women and Montana Women's Political Caucus in Great Falls. In 1972, she and Sherlee T. Graybill served as Montana's delegates to the National Women's Political Caucus' first convention.

During the 1972 presidential election, she supported Shirley Chisholm during the Democratic presidential primaries, and served as a Chisholm delegate to the Democratic National Convention. During the primary campaign, Travis had been selected to serve as chair of the Support for Shirley Chisholm Club.

During the 1980 presidential election, Travis served as co-chair of the Democratic Party's social services platform committee and as a presidential elector for presidential and vice-presidential nominees Jimmy Carter and Walter Mondale.

She moved to Arizona in 1989.

=== Montana House of Representatives ===
Travis was elected to the Montana House of Representatives from the 43rd district in 1974, becoming the first black woman to serve in the Montana House of Representatives. The 43rd district represented the Malmstrom Air Force Base and contained over 5,500 people, but only had 138 registered voters. In the general election, Travis won with twenty votes against her opponent's five votes after spending $712 during the campaign. She lost reelection to Republican nominee Warren O'Keefe in 1976.

Travis ran for a seat in the Montana House of Representatives in 1980, 1982, and 1984, but lost all three times.

== See also ==
- Female state legislators in the United States
- List of African-American U.S. state firsts
- List of first African-American U.S. state legislators
