= Auden Grogins =

American politician

Member of the Connecticut House of Representatives from the 129th district
- In office January 7, 2009 – January 7, 2015
- Preceded by: Robert T. Keeley Jr.
- Succeeded by: Steven Stafstrom

Personal details
- Born: February 5, 1962 (age 64) Bridgeport, Connecticut, U.S.
- Party: Democratic

Auden Grogins (born February 5, 1962) is an American politician who served in the Connecticut House of Representatives from the 129th district from 2009 to 2015.
