= Helen Smith (Connecticut politician) =

American politician (1901–1996)

- Smith c. 1946

Member of the Connecticut House of Representatives from Milford
- In office 1945–1951 Serving with Noyes L. Hall (1945–1949); Fred H. Merwin (1949–1951)
- Preceded by: Noyes L. Hall; William Gitlitz
- Succeeded by: Robert H. Clemence; Herbert R. Elker

Personal details
- Born: February 19, 1901 Milford, Connecticut, U.S.
- Died: September 17, 1996 (aged 95) Bridgeport, Connecticut, U.S.
- Party: Republican
- Relatives: Winthrop Smith (grandnephew)

Helen M. Smith (February 19, 1901 – September 17, 1996) was an American politician who served in the Connecticut House of Representatives from 1945 to 1951, representing the town of Milford as a Republican.

== Personal life ==
Smith was born on February 19, 1901, in Milford, Connecticut, to George Judson and Ellen Rhoena Clark Smith. She graduated from Smith College in 1923. Smith was the great-aunt of State Senator Winthrop Smith Jr.

== Political career ==
A Republican, Smith was first elected to the Connecticut House of Representatives in 1944, and she served three terms as one of two representatives from the town of Milford. She served her first two terms alongside Noyes L. Hall, and the third alongside Fred H. Merwin. Smith did not run for reelection in 1950.

== Death ==
Smith died on September 17, 1996, in Bridgeport, Connecticut. She was 95.
