= James Maroney =

American politician

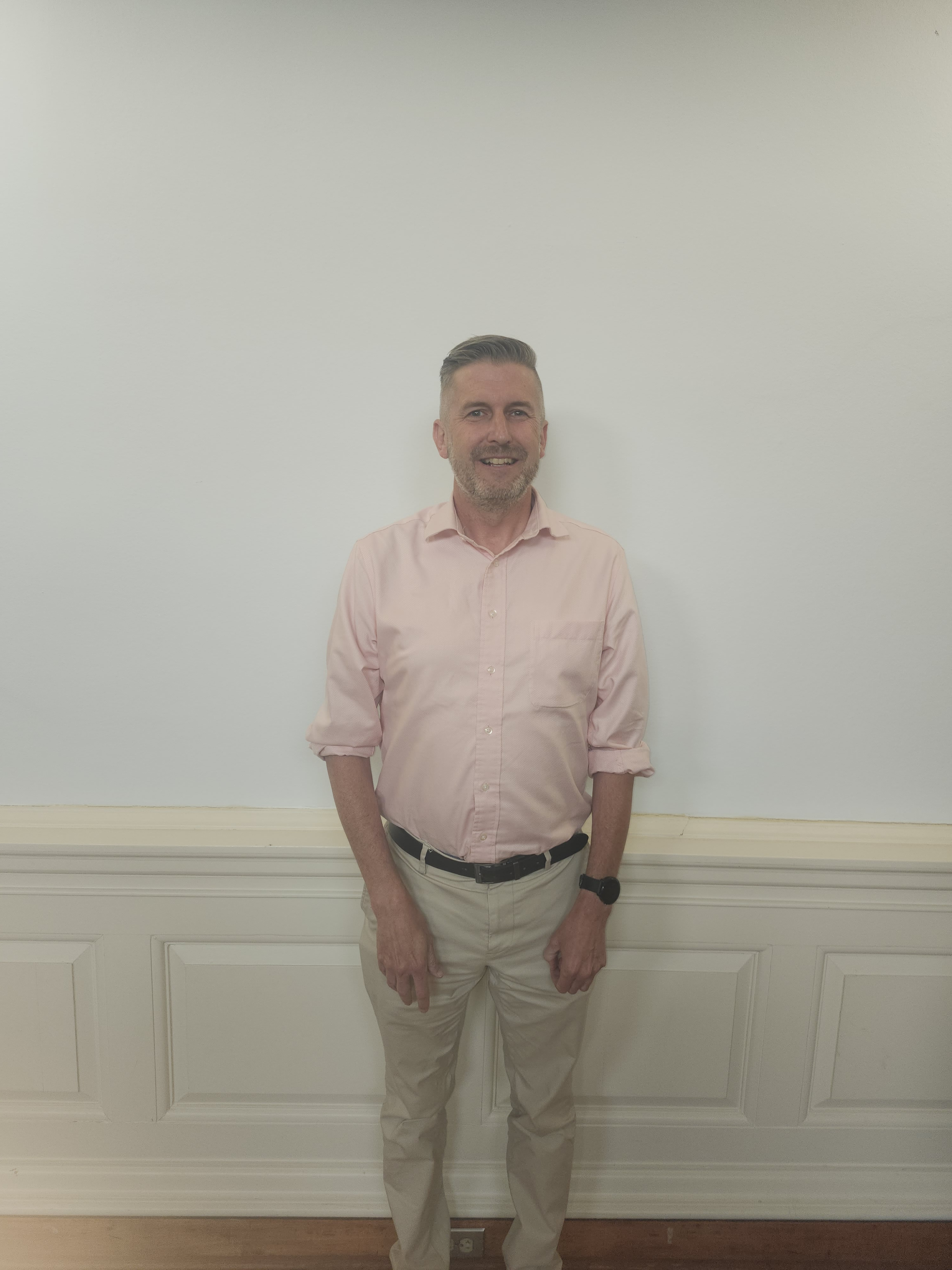
- Maroney in 2025

Member of the Connecticut House of Representatives from the 119th district
- In office 2013–2015
- Preceded by: Richard Roy
- Succeeded by: Pam Staneski

Member of the Connecticut Senate from the 14th district
- Incumbent
- Assumed office January 9, 2019
- Preceded by: Gayle Slossberg
- Constituency: Milford, Orange, West Haven (part), Woodbridge (part)

Personal details
- Party: Democratic
- Website: www.senatedems.ct.gov/senator/james-maroney

James Maroney is an American politician currently serving as a Connecticut State senator representing the 14th District, encompassing Milford, Orange, and parts of West Haven and Woodbridge. Maroney is a member of the Democratic Party. Maroney also previously served as a member of the Connecticut House of Representatives, where he represented the 119th District. Maroney is McKayla Maroney's cousin.

== Political career ==
=== Connecticut House of Representatives ===
From 2013 to 2015, Maroney represented the 119th District in the Connecticut House of Representatives. In 2014, Maroney lost his re-election campaign in a tight race against Pam Staneski, whose votes from the Independent Party ticket secured a 1.8% margin of victory over Maroney.

=== Connecticut State Senate ===
Maroney made his return to politics in 2018, when he ran for the 14th District state senate seat. In the election, he once again ran against Pam Staneski, who he defeated in a once again close election. Maroney would win again in 2020 against Mike Southworth. During his time in the senate, he has served on such committees as the General Law Committee and the Veterans' affairs Committee. Maroney played a major role in the senate's decision to extend outdoor dining service in Connecticut until March 2022.
