= Connecticut's 14th State Senate district =

American legislative district

Senator
James Maroney; D

Connecticut's 14th State Senate district elects one member of the Connecticut State Senate. It consists of the towns of Milford, Orange, and parts of West Haven and Woodbridge. It is currently represented by Democrat James Maroney.

== Recent elections ==
=== 2020 ===
2020 Connecticut State Senate election, District 14
Party	Candidate	Votes	%
Democratic	James Maroney (incumbent)	28,388	53.06
Republican	Michael Southworth	22,830	42.67
Independent Party	James Maroney (incumbent)	1,428	2.67
Working Families	James Maroney (incumbent)	854	1.60
Total votes		53,500	100.00
Democratic hold			

=== 2018 ===
2018 Connecticut State Senate election, District 14
Party	Candidate	Votes	%
Total	James Maroney	21,926	51.2
Democratic	James Maroney	20,502	47.9
Working Families	James Maroney	854	2.0
Independent	James Maroney	570	1.3
Republican	Pam Staneski	20,888	48.8
Total votes		42,814	100.0
Democratic hold			

=== 2016 ===
2016 Connecticut State Senate election, District 14
Party	Candidate	Votes	%
Democratic	Gayle Slossberg (Incumbent)	26,549	56.03
Republican	Pat Libero	20,836	43.97
Total votes		47,385	100.0
Democratic hold			

=== 2014 ===
2014 Connecticut State Senate election, District 14
Party	Candidate	Votes	%
Democratic	Gayle Slossberg (Incumbent)	18,234	56.80
Republican	Matt Gaynor	13,013	40.5
Independent	Matt Gaynor	847	2.6
Total votes		47,385	100.0
Democratic hold			

=== 2012 ===
2016 Connecticut State Senate election, District 14
Party	Candidate	Votes	%
Democratic	Gayle Slossberg (Incumbent)	27,696	64.30
Republican	Pat Libero	15,347	35.7
Total votes		43,043	100.0
Democratic hold			
