= Margaret E. Morton =

American politician (1924–2012)

Member of the Connecticut Senate from the 23rd district
- In office 1981–1993
- Preceded by: Salvatore DePiano
- Succeeded by: Alvin Penn

Member of the Connecticut House of Representatives from the 129th district
- In office 1973–1980
- Preceded by: William J. Smyth
- Succeeded by: Thomas K. Coble

Personal details
- Born: Margaret Elizabeth Woods; June 23, 1924 Pocahontas, Virginia, US
- Died: March 10, 2012 (aged 87) Bridgeport, Connecticut, US
- Party: Democratic Party
- Occupation: Politician, funeral director

Margaret Elizabeth Morton (June 23, 1924 – March 10, 2012) was an American politician and funeral director who served four terms in the Connecticut House of Representatives and six terms in the Connecticut State Senate from 1973 to 1993.

Representing the city of Bridgeport as a Democrat, Morton was the first African American woman to serve in the General Assembly. She rose to assistant majority leader in the House and retired as the Senate's deputy president pro tempore. She ran for Senate in 1980 in defiance of powerful Bridgeport mayor John C. Mandanici. Through a voter registration drive, Morton defeated incumbent Salvatore DePiano by eight votes in the Democratic primary and beat back a legal challenge to her win. She drew attention for seeking to ban discrimination against people with HIV/AIDS after her son, Gerald, died of AIDS.

Morton was born in Pocahontas, Virginia, to parents Aaron and Leona (Hurt) Woods. She grew up in Bluefield, West Virginia and graduated high school summa cum laude. She married James Morton in 1941 and moved to Bridgeport. Morton served as one of the Tuskegee Airmen during World War II. The couple owned and operated Morton's Mortuary starting in 1956. Now operated by her son Robert L. Morton, the funeral home is located on Margaret E. Morton Lane in Bridgeport's East End.

In 2012, the Bridgeport City Hall Annex was named the Margaret E. Morton Government Center in her honor. Connecticut's African American female legislators (four of them at the time) nominated her to the Connecticut Women's Hall of Fame in 2017. In 2020, USA Today selected her as one of ten Women of the Century from Connecticut.
