= Connecticut's 119th House of Representatives district =

American legislative district

Connecticut's 119th State House of Representatives district
Representative
| Kathy Kennedy; R |

Connecticut's 119th House of Representatives district elects one member of the Connecticut House of Representatives. It encompasses parts of Orange and Milford and has been represented by Republican Kathy Kennedy since 2019.

== List of representatives ==
List of Representatives from Connecticut's 119th State House District
| Representative | Party | Years | District home | Note |
|---|---|---|---|---|
| Henry Lionetti | Democratic | 1967–1969 | Derby | Seat created |
| Silvio A. Mastrianni | Democratic | 1969–1973 | Derby | |
| Gerald F. Stevens | Republican | 1973–1979 | Milford | |
| Gerard B. Patton | Republican | 1979–1989 | Milford | |
| Pete Smith | Democratic | 1989–1993 | Milford | |
| Richard Roy | Democratic | 1993–2013 | Milford | |
| James Maroney | Democratic | 2013–2015 | Milford | |
| Pam Staneski | Republican | 2015–2019 | Milford | |
| Kathy Kennedy | Republican | 2019– | Milford | |

== Recent elections ==
=== 2020 ===
2020 Connecticut State House of Representatives election, District 119
| Party | Candidate | Votes | % |
|---|---|---|---|
| Republican | Kathy Kennedy (incumbent) | 7,260 | 50.53 |
| Democratic | Bryan Anderson | 6,640 | 46.22 |
| Independent Party | Bryan Anderson | 302 | 2.10 |
| Working Families | Bryan Anderson | 165 | 1.15 |
| Total votes | | 14,367 | 100.00 |
| Republican hold | | | |

=== 2018 ===
2018 Connecticut House of Representatives election, District 119
| Party | Candidate | Votes | % |
|---|---|---|---|
| Republican | Kathy Kennedy | 6,063 | 53.5 |
| Democratic | Ellen Beatty | 5,268 | 46.5 |
| Total votes | | 11,331 | 100.00 |
| Republican hold | | | |

=== 2016 ===
2016 Connecticut House of Representatives election, District 119
| Party | Candidate | Votes | % |
|---|---|---|---|
| Republican | Pam Staneski (Incumbent) | 7,538 | 59.03 |
| Democratic | Ben Gettinger | 5,231 | 40.97 |
| Total votes | | 12,769 | 100.00 |
| Republican hold | | | |

=== 2014 ===
2014 Connecticut House of Representatives election, District 119
| Party | Candidate | Votes | % |
|---|---|---|---|
| Republican | Pam Staneski | 4,170 | 48.0 |
| Democratic | James Maroney (Incumbent) | 4,272 | 49.1 |
| Independent Party | Pam Staneski | 253 | 2.9 |
| Total votes | | 12,769 | 100.00 |
| Republican gain from Democratic | | | |

=== 2012 ===
2012 Connecticut House of Representatives election, District 119
| Party | Candidate | Votes | % |
|---|---|---|---|
| Democratic | James Maroney (Incumbent) | 5,998 | 52.0 |
| Republican | Pam Staneski | 5,528 | 48.0 |
| Total votes | | 11,526 | 100.00 |
| Democratic hold | | | |
