= Anderson Louis Rush =

Arkansas politician

Anderson Louis Rush (c. 1838–1879) was a state legislator in Arkansas. He represented Pulaski County in the Arkansas House of Representatives in 1868 and 1869. He was a Republican. He was one of the six African Americans who first served in the Arkansas House. He represented the 10th District.

== See also ==
- African American officeholders from the end of the Civil War until before 1900
