= Richard R. Samuels =

Arkansas politician

Richard R. Samuels (c. 1844–1878) was a farmer, blacksmith and state legislator in Arkansas. He was a delegate to the 1868 Arkansas Constitutional Convention from Hempstead County, Arkansas. He was one of 8 African American delegates at the convention. He represented Hempstead County, Arkansas in the Arkansas House of Representatives in 1868 and 1869. He was a Republican. He was one of the first six African Americans to serve in the Arkansas Legislature. At The Brindle Convention in 1872 he was nominated for the position of superintendent of the penitentiary. He also served on the grand jury for a fraud and corruption trial in Hempstead.

Later in 1872 he was elected clerk for Hempstead to serve with James W. Vance who was re-elected as Sheriff. A few months later judge T. G. T. Steele put a restraining order on Samuels and Thomas M. Higgs commanding them not to exercise their duties of clerk and deputy sheriff. T. G. T. Steele then later issued writs for the arrest of Samuels, Mitchell and Higgs for contempt of these order but was then himself investigate by the Senate for his conduct and exceeding his jurisdiction.

He came from Washington County, Arkansas where he had been a respected blacksmith.

== See also ==
- African American officeholders from the end of the Civil War until before 1900
