= Monroe E. Hawkins =

American politician

Monroe E. Hawkins was a state legislator in Arkansas. He attended the 1868 Arkansas Constitutional Convention and served in the Arkansas House of Representatives. A Republican, he represented Lafayette County, Arkansas. He served in the House from 1868 to 1869 and 1873 to 1874.

He was born in North Carolina where he was enslaved from birth.

A historical marker was erected in Stamps, Arkansas to commemorate him and two other African Americans who represented Lafayette County, Marshall M. Murray and Conway Barbour.

== See also ==
- African American officeholders from the end of the Civil War until before 1900
