= Josetta Wilkins =

American educator and politician (1932–2023)

Josetta Edwards Wilkins (July 17, 1932 – August 25, 2023) was an American educator and politician. She served four terms in the Arkansas House of Representatives from 1991 to 1999.

She lived in Pine Bluff. Wilkins first announced her intent to seek election to the Arkansas House of Representatives in 1991, following the death of her husband, Henry Wilkins III, who at the time of his death had held the seat since 1973. As a legislator, Wilkins "was one of the early sponsors of Breast Cancer Act and worked over a period of four years to get passed". In 1999, the Governor's Breast Cancer Control Advisory Board established the "Josetta Wilkins Award" to honor champions of saving lives from the disease, with Wilkins being the first recipient of the award. In 2022, a Health Unit was named for her. Her son, Hank Wilkins, also served in the state legislature.
