= Jamie Ceasar =

American photographer

- Born: Columbus, Ohio, United States
- Occupation: Photographer
- Website: ceasar614.com

Documentary photograph by Jamie Ceasar of George Floyd Protests, Columbus, Ohio, 2020

Jamie Ceasar is an American film photographer from Columbus, Ohio known for his documentary photographs and portraits. Ceasar has exhibited work across the United States, including at the Cincinnati Art Museum and the Schumacher Gallery at Capital University.

Ceasar's influences include photographers Gordon Parks, Don Hogan Charles, Jamel Shabazz and Deana Lawson. In 2020, the Greater Columbus Arts Council granted him an Art Unites CBUS award for his work documenting the George Floyd protests in the city.

Ceasar is also the founder of The Film Cypher, a Columbus-based photography collective.
