= Henry Wilkins (basketball) =

British basketball player (born 1990)

No. 7 – Surrey Scorchers
- Position: Shooting guard
- League: British Basketball League

Personal information
- Born: 8 October 1990 (age 36) Guildford, Surrey, England
- Listed height: 6 ft 5 in (1.96 m)
- Listed weight: 190 lb (86 kg)

Career information
- High school: Godalming
- College: Richmond (2007–2009)
- NBA draft: 2012: undrafted
- Playing career: 2010–present

Career history
- 2010–2013: Leeds Force
- 2013–2014: Næstved
- 2014–2015: Villarrobledo
- 2015–2016: Surrey Scorchers
- 2015–2016: Globalcaja Quintanar
- 2016–2017: Dornbirn Lions
- 2017–2018: Tarragona
- 2018–2022: Surrey Scorchers

Henry Robert Newell Wilkins (born 8 October 1990) is a British professional basketball player who currently plays for the Worthing Thunder in NBL Division 1.

== Early life ==
Wilkins played for the Kingston Wildcats from U12 to U16, before spending two seasons with the London Towers.

== College career ==
In 2007, Wilkins joined Richmond College and spent two seasons with the team. He helped the U18 team win their conference in his first year before being knocked out in the play-offs, and led the team in scoring with an average of 26.4 points per game.

The following year, he led the team with an average of 28.1 points per game as Richmond finished as league runner-up and reached the second round of the national play-offs.

Also playing with the men's team, he reached the national semi-finals of his division and was the leading scorer in the country with an average of 21.8 points per game.

== Professional career ==
In 2010, Wilkins joined the Leeds Force of the National Basketball League. Playing 35 games, he averaged 9.4 points, 1.5 assists, 2.3 rebounds and 0.4 steals during his three seasons with the team.

In 2013, he turned professional with Danish club Næstved and played 15 times in the Basketligaen. Wilkins joined Villarrobledo in Spain a year later, before returning to England to join British Basketball League team the Surrey Scorchers for the 2015–16 season. After struggling for minutes, Wilkins returned to Spain to join Globalcaja Quintanar for the remainder of the season.

Wilkins returned to semi-professional level for the 2016–17 season and joined Austrian team the Dornbirn Lions. The following year saw him move to Spain for a third time to join Tarragona, where he played 15 times.

In September 2018, Wilkins rejoined the Surrey Scorchers.
