= Hank Wilkins =

American politician (born 1954)

Member of the Arkansas House of Representatives from the 17th district January 1999–January 2001
- In office January 2011 – January 2015
- Preceded by: Stephanie Flowers
- Succeeded by: Vivian Flowers

Member of the Arkansas Senate from the 5th district
- In office January 2003 – January 2011
- Preceded by: Jim Hill
- Succeeded by: Stephanie Flowers

Member of the Arkansas Senate from the 8th district
- In office January 2001 – January 2003
- Succeeded by: Dave Bisbee

Personal details
- Born: Henry Wilkins IV; December 13, 1954 (age 71) Pine Bluff, Arkansas
- Party: Democratic
- Parent(s): Henry Wilkins III; Josetta Wilkins
- Education: University of Michigan; St. Paul Seminary; Philander Smith College

Henry "Hank" Wilkins IV (born December 13, 1954, in Pine Bluff, Arkansas) is an American politician and a Democratic former member of the Arkansas House of Representatives. He represented District 17 from January 2011 to 2015. Wilkins was consecutively a member of the Arkansas House from January 1999 until January 2001 and the Arkansas Senate from January 2001 until January 2011. He held the District 5 and 8 seats. He was convicted and sentenced for crimes related to bribery.

== Early life and education ==
Wilkins was born on December 13, 1954, in Pine Bluff, Arkansas. His parents were Henry Wilkins III, who served in the Arkansas House of Representatives from 1973 to 1991, and Josetta Wilkins, who served in the House from 1991 to 1998. Wilkins earned his Bachelor of Arts from the University of Michigan in Ann Arbor, his M.Div. from the St. Paul Seminary in Kansas City, Missouri, his Ph.D. from Philander Smith College, and his Doctor of Laws from The University of Arkansas System.

== Elections ==
- 1998 Wilkins was initially elected to the Arkansas House of Representatives in the 1998 Democratic Primary and the November 3, 1998 General election.
- 2000 When the Senate District 8 seat was open, Wilkins ran in the 2000 Democratic Primary and won, and was unopposed for the November 7, 2000 General election.
- 2002 Redistricted to District 5, Wilkins was unopposed for the 2002 Democratic Primary, and won the November 5, 2002 General election against Independent candidate Jimmie Wilson.
- 2006 Wilkins was challenged in the 2006 Democratic Primary, but won, and was unopposed for the November 7, 2006 General election.
- 2010 When House District 17 Representative Stephanie Flowers ran for Arkansas Senate and left the seat open, Wilkins ran for the District 17 House seat and was unopposed for both the May 18, 2010 Democratic Primary and the November 2, 2010 General election.
- 2012 Wilkins was unopposed for both the May 22, 2012 Democratic Primary and the November 6, 2012 General election.

== Conviction ==
Wilkins pled guilty to conspiracy and filing false tax returns in 2017 for accepting $80,000 in bribes in exchange for influencing state legislation. He was sentenced to one year and a day in prison and ordered to pay $123,000 in restitution.

== See also ==
- List of first minority male lawyers and judges in Arkansas
