= Wilfred X. Johnson =

American politician (1920–1972)

Member of the Connecticut House of Representatives
- In office 1959–1967
- Succeeded by: Leonard Frazier

Personal details
- Born: Wilfred Xavier Johnson; 1920 Dawson, Georgia, US
- Died: January 31, 1972 Hartford, Connecticut, US
- Party: Democrat
- Spouse: Gertrude Johnson
- Education: Hillyer College
- Occupation: Politician, bank teller

Wilfred Xavier Johnson (1920 – January 31, 1972) was an American politician who in 1958 became the first African American elected to the Connecticut General Assembly. A Democrat, he represented Hartford's heavily African American North End in the state's House of Representatives from 1959 to 1967. He was also the first African American bank teller in Connecticut.

== Life and work ==
Born in Dawson, Georgia, in 1920 (exact birth date unknown), Johnson came to Hartford in 1925 with his parents, Eugene and Griselda Johnson, as part of the early waves of the Great Migration. He attended Hartford's public schools, graduating from Weaver High School in 1939 and earning the lifelong nickname "Spike" on the baseball diamond. He served as a dental technician in the US Army from 1943 to 1946, attended Hillyer College, and trained at the American Institute of Banking.

Since high school, Johnson had worked as a messenger for the Hartford National Bank in downtown Hartford. After his military service, he clerked in the bank's analysis department and in 1955 achieved a promotion to bank teller. Johnson was the first African American bank teller in Connecticut. He continued to work as a teller until his death in 1972. In addition to his full-time job, Johnson ran a haberdashery called Johnson's Men's Furnishings on Hartford's Main Street between 1949 and 1954, in partnership with his brother Howard. In 1964, he opened a liquor store called Spike's Spirit Shoppe on Barbour Avenue.

== Political career ==
A Democrat, Johnson first became active in politics in 1946 when he canvassed neighborhoods to drum up Democratic voters. He ran unsuccessfully for Hartford City Council in 1953 and again in 1957. In 1958, backed by Boce W. Barlow Jr., he became the first black candidate for state representative in Connecticut's history to receive the endorsement of the Democratic Party. Running for an open seat, he defeated two black Republicans, J. Blanton Shields and Margaret Ardrey, in that year's race.

Johnson was reelected for four consecutive terms and served from 1959 until 1967. He lost the Democratic primary to Leonard G. Frazier in 1966. As a freshman representative, Johnson served as acting speaker of the House in 1959. The governor also named him a colonel in the Governor's Foot Guard. Johnson co-chaired Hartford's third ward during this period.

== Personal life ==
Johnson married Gertrude Hayes (1927–2013) in 1949. The couple had three daughters (Dawn, Winifred, and Sara) and two sons (Wilfred X. Jr. and Jeffrey Paul).

Gertrude Johnson was active in Connecticut Democratic Party politics, serving as treasurer of the Connecticut Young Democrats in 1957. She was a co-founder of Project Concern, a school integration program that bused African American urban schoolchildren to mostly white suburban schools during the 1960s and 1970s.

Johnson died of cancer at Saint Francis Hospital on January 31, 1972, at age 51. The State Senate passed a resolution paying tribute to Johnson in February 1972. After a funeral held at Union Baptist Church, Johnson was interred with military honors in Rose Hill Memorial Park in Rocky Hill, Connecticut.

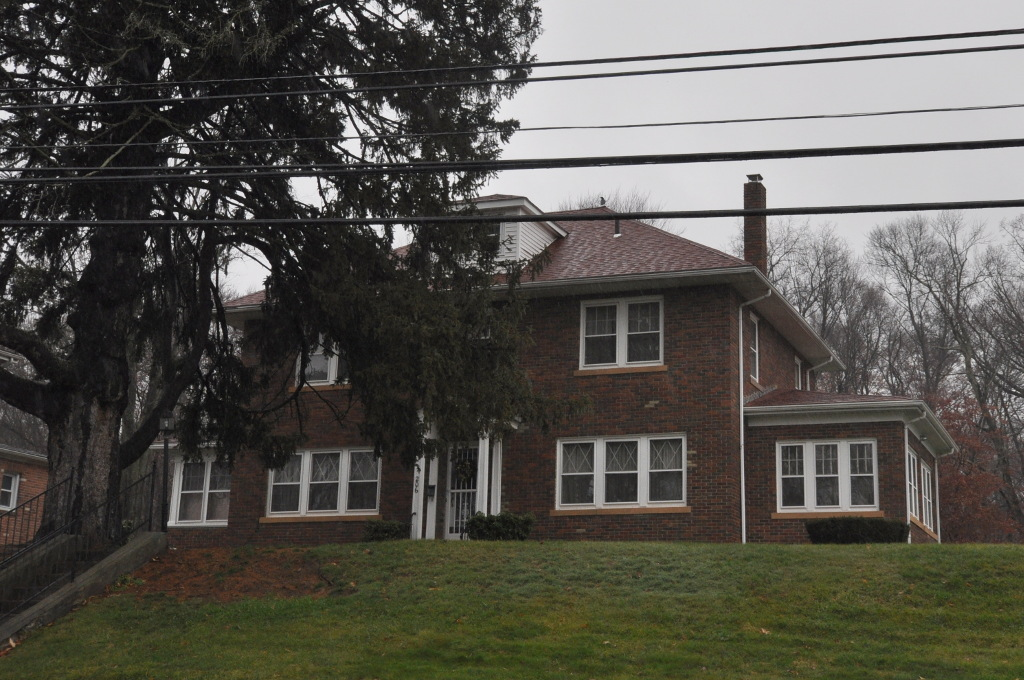
Wilfred X. Johnson House in 2018

== Wilfred X. Johnson House ==
In recognition of his leadership and pioneering "firsts", Johnson's home at 206 Tower Avenue in the North End of Hartford is listed on the National Register of Historic Places and on the Connecticut Freedom Trail. His family had moved there in 1966.
