= Andre Baker (politician) =

Connecticut politician

Member of the Connecticut House of Representatives from the 124th district
- Incumbent
- Assumed office January 7, 2015
- Preceded by: Charles "Don" Clemons, Jr

Personal details
- Born: August 23, 1963 (age 63) New Rochelle, New York, U.S.
- Party: Democratic
- Education: Farmingdale State College (AS)

Andre F. Baker Jr. (born August 23, 1963) is an American politician and businessman serving as a member of the Connecticut House of Representatives from the 124th district. He assumed office on January 7, 2015.

== Early life and education ==
Baker was born and raised in New Rochelle, New York. He earned an Associate of Science degree in mortuary science from Farmingdale State College in 1986.

== Career ==
Baker is the owner and CEO of Baker-Isaac Funeral Services in Bridgeport, Connecticut and Baker Funeral Services in South Norwalk, Connecticut. He was also a member of the Bridgeport Common Council for eight years and the Bridgeport Board of Education for two years. Baker was elected to the Connecticut House of Representatives in November 2014 and assumed office on January 7, 2015. During the 2019–2020 legislative session, Baker served as vice chair of the House Planning and Development Committee.
