= Lee Samowitz =

American politician

Member of the Connecticut House of Representatives from the 129th district
- In office January 7, 1987 – January 8, 2003
- Preceded by: Casey Daly
- Succeeded by: Robert T. Keeley Jr.
- In office January 5, 1983 – January 9, 1985
- Preceded by: Thomas K. Coble
- Succeeded by: Casey Daly

Personal details
- Party: Democratic

Lee Samowitz is an American politician who served in the Connecticut House of Representatives from the 129th district from 1983 to 1985 and from 1987 to 2003.
