= Henry Wilkins III =

American politician from Arkansas (1930–1991)

Member of the Arkansas House of Representatives
- In office 1973–1991

Personal details
- Born: January 4, 1930
- Died: February 20, 1991 (aged 61)
- Party: Democratic
- Spouse: Josetta Wilkins
- Relations: Hank Wilkins (son); Rodney E. Slater (son-in-law)
- Children: Calvin T Terry, Hank Wilkins, Cassanda F Wilkins, Mark R Wilkins, Angela J Wilkins
- Occupation: Politician, educator, community activist

Look Henry Wilkins III (January 4, 1930 – February 20, 1991) was an American politician and educator who served in the Arkansas House of Representatives from 1973 to 1991. Alongside Richard Mays and William Townsend, he was the first African American to serve in the Arkansas Legislature since the Reconstruction era. His wife, Josetta Wilkins, and their son, Henry "Hank" Wilkins IV, also served as state legislators.

== Life and career ==
Wilkins was a professor of political science at the University of Arkansas at Pine Bluff. Alongside lawyer Richard Mays and optometrist William Townsend, Wilkins was the first African American to serve in the Arkansas Legislature since the Reconstruction era. Wilkins was narrowly elected in 1972 to represent a Black-majority district of Jefferson County, Arkansas, in the Arkansas House of Representatives. Elected to ten consecutive terms, he served in the Arkansas House until his death in 1991. He also served as a delegate to the 1970 and the 1980 Arkansas Constitutional Conventions (he was the sole African American delegate to the 1970 convention) and co-founded the Arkansas Legislative Black Caucus in 1989. Wilkins and state senator Jerry Jewell were instrumental in the 1977 passage of legislation establishing a state civil rights commission.

Wilkins died from cancer on February 20, 1991. His wife, Josetta Wilkins, won a special election to fill the remainder of his term in the House. She was reelected four times. Their son, Henry "Hank" Wilkins IV, succeeded his mother in the House in 1999 and served fourteen years in the state legislature. Their daughter, Cassandra Wilkins, married Rodney E. Slater, who served as United States Secretary of Transportation under President Bill Clinton.
