= Kathy Kennedy =

American politician from Connecticut

- Kennedy in 2026

Member of the Connecticut House of Representatives from the 119th district
- Incumbent
- Assumed office January 9, 2019
- Preceded by: Pam Staneski

Personal details
- Born: 1957 (age 68–69)
- Party: Republican
- Education: Southern Connecticut State University (BA)

Kathleen Kennedy (born 1957) is an American Republican Party politician currently serving as a member of the Connecticut House of Representatives from the 119th district, which includes part of Orange and Milford. Kennedy was first elected in 2018 over Democrat Ellen Beatty. She was narrowly re-elected in 2020 over Democrat Bryan Anderson. On March 5, 2022, it was reported that Kennedy would seek re-election in the upcoming 2022 elections. Kennedy currently serves as a member of the Appropriations, Public Health, and Education Committees and is also the Ranking Member of the Executive and Legislations Nominations Committee.
