= Pam Staneski =

American politician (born 1959)

Member of the Connecticut House of Representatives from the 119th district
- In office 2015–2019
- Preceded by: James Maroney
- Succeeded by: Kathy Kennedy

Personal details
- Born: November 25, 1959 (age 66)
- Party: Republican
- Education: Old Dominion University (B.S.)

Pamela Staneski (born November 25, 1959) is an American politician who served in the Connecticut House of Representatives from 2015 to 2019, representing the 119th district as a Republican.
