= Caesar Perkins =

American politician (1839–1910)

Caesar Perkins (March 1839 – September 22, 1910) was a member of the Virginia General Assembly, elected in both 1869 and 1887. He represented Buckingham County as a Republican.

== Early life ==
Caesar Perkins was born into slavery in March 1839. His name is sometimes rendered as Ceasar Perkins. His parents' names were Joseph and Clarcy Mosely, but he used the name "Perkins" because it was the name of his master. It is not known how Perkins was freed from slavery.

He was a Baptist minister.

== Political career ==
In 1869, Perkins was elected to the Virginia General Assembly, and he was elected again in 1887; in both cases, he represented Buckingham County. In his first election, he defeated candidates from the Conservative Party. He was a Republican. During his first term, he voted to ratify the Fourteenth and Fifteenth Amendments to the United States Constitution, which codified racial equality.

In 1898, Perkins served at the state's Republican convention, which nominated Colonel R. T. Hubard (or Hubbard) for Congress. Hubard denied that Perkins had been promised anything for the nomination. Two years later, Perkins served again at the state's Republican convention, which again nominated Hubard for Congress.

According to a newspaper account in 1904, he was the last-serving black member of the Virginia legislature. The same story, which caricatured what the writers called his "genuine darky dialect" (for instance, rendering part of his speech as "Yawl Democrats [...] is 'bout ter let dis assembly break up widout keepin' yo' promis' ter pass on de licker question"), was reprinted years later in other newspapers.

== Death ==
Perkins died on September 22, 1910.

== See also ==
- African American officeholders from the end of the Civil War until before 1900
