= Gayle Slossberg =

American politician

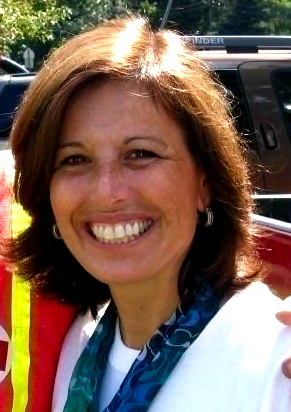

Member of the Connecticut State Senate from the 14th district
- In office 2005–2019
- Preceded by: Win Smith
- Succeeded by: James Maroney
- Constituency: Represents Milford, Orange, and parts of Woodbridge and West Haven

Personal details
- Born: May 14, 1965 (age 61) Brookline, Massachusetts
- Party: Democratic
- Spouse: David Slossberg
- Children: Becca, Alex, Jeremy
- Website: http://www.senatedems.ct.gov/slossberg

Gayle Slossberg (born May 14, 1965) is an American politician. A Democrat, Slossberg is a former seven term Connecticut State Senator having served between 2005 and 2019.

A resident of Milford, Slossberg as senator represented the western suburbs of New Haven in the Connecticut Senate's 14th District, which includes the city of Milford, the town of Orange, the town of Woodbridge, and part of the city of West Haven.

Slossberg was born and raised in Massachusetts, graduated from Cornell University in 1987, and earned a J.D. degree from New York University School of Law in 1990. She practiced law in New York with the firm of Cleary, Gottlieb, Steen & Hamilton before moving to Milford.

Slossberg served on the board of directors of the Milford Visiting Nurses Association, is a past president of the Mathewson Elementary School PTA, and is a member of the Endowment Committee for Bridges. She mentored a teen mom via “Bright Beginnings,” a Yale-New Haven Hospital program that brings together experienced mothers with teenage mothers to be. Prior to being elected to the Senate, Slossberg served on the Milford Board of Aldermen and was its Democratic minority leader from 2001 to 2004.

== Legislative career ==
In 2004, Slossberg was elected to the Connecticut Senate by defeating six-term incumbent Republican Win Smith by about 1,600 votes. A bizarre incident occurred late in the campaign regarding allegations that Slossberg lawn signs were dumped at a local synagogue. A Slossberg aide claimed it was a hate crime, but no evidence in support of this charge was ever provided.

In the 2005-2006 legislative sessions, Slossberg served as co-chair of the Veterans Affairs Committee, on which she worked for a veterans' benefits package, which included establishing a Military Family Relief Fund to provide financial assistance to family members of people serving in both the U.S. armed forces and the Connecticut National Guard. Slossberg also created the Depleted Uranium Task Force to study the effects of toxic substances on soldiers who fought in the Middle East.

In 2006, Slossberg won re-election against Barbara Lisman, the widow of former Milford Mayor Frederick L. Lisman.

In the 2007 legislative session, Slossberg served as chair of the Government Administration & Elections Committee, vice chair of the Public Health Committee, vice chair of the Veterans' Affairs Committee, and as a Member of the Appropriations Committee.

In 2007, Slossberg proposed that Connecticut adopt same-day voter registration. Republicans charged that such systems enable voter fraud to be committed. For that reason, then-Governor John G. Rowland vetoed a similar bill in 2003.

On December 11, 2007, Slossberg proposed ethics reforms for the Connecticut Senate in wake of the CSU bonding scandal centered around fellow Democratic Senator Thomas Gaffey.

In January 2008, Slossberg opposed Governor M. Jodi Rell's proposal to pass a Three Strikes Law mandating life prison terms for career violent criminals. Rell had sought this reform in the wake of a 2007 home invasion in Cheshire.

In the November 4, 2008 election, Slossberg defeated Republican challenger Vincent Marino, town attorney of Orange, to win re-election. Slossberg faced Marino again in the 2010 election and was re-elected to a fourth term.

On April 29, 2014, she voted for a comprehensive campus sexual assault safety bill which aims to protect more people, apply to additional schools, provide on-call crisis counseling and ensure sexual assault victims' anonymity is protected when issuing a report.

In 2017 Slossberg attempted to stop a $10 million improvement plan for Silver Sands State Park, but was unsuccessful.

In October 2017 while discussing with UConn College Democrats her efforts to purge local school libraries of books containing offensive language, Gayle Slossberg used the "N-word" in its explicit form without euphemisms. Her use of the word was highly offensive to the group and others including the NAACP. Slossberg later issued an apology.

In February 2018 Slossberg announced as co-chair of the education committee that she got approval for the West Haven High School to do a $130 million renovation, which will help ingrate education and enrollment in the school.

On March 8, 2018, Slossberg announced that she would not be a candidate for reelection.

Connecticut State Senate
Preceded by Win Smith	Connecticut Senator from the Fourteenth District; 2005–present	Succeeded by incumbent
