= Ernie Newton (politician) =

American politician (born 1956)

Member of the Bridgeport City Council from the 139th District
- Incumbent
- Assumed office 2017
- Preceded by: James Halloway

Member of the Connecticut State Senate from the 23rd district
- In office April 2003 – September 16, 2005
- Preceded by: Alvin Penn
- Succeeded by: Ed Gomes

Member of the Connecticut House of Representatives from the 124th district
- In office January 1989 – April 2003
- Preceded by: Sheila Baker
- Succeeded by: Charles "Don" Clemons, Jr

Personal details
- Born: February 21, 1956 (age 70) Fairfax County, Virginia
- Spouse: Pamela Newton

Ernest E. Newton II (born February 21, 1956) is an American politician in Bridgeport, Connecticut. Newton served for seventeen years in the Connecticut General Assembly, serving in the Connecticut House of Representatives from 1988 to 2003 and in the Connecticut State Senate from 2003 to 2005. He pleaded guilty to federal felony corruption charges in September 2005 and served several years in federal prison. Newton was released in February 2010 and in 2012 unsuccessfully attempted a political comeback, losing in the primary in a race for his old state Senate seat. He pleaded guilty to three campaign finance violations in 2019, relating to his 2012 legislative campaign.

== Career ==
Newton, a Democrat, specifically part of the Democratic Party of Connecticut, was a member of the Bridgeport City Council in the 1980s. He served in the Connecticut House of Representatives from 1988 to 2003 and in the Connecticut State Senate from 2003 to 2005.

Newton represented an area of Bridgeport that was one of poorest districts in Connecticut, and was "a powerful figure from the city's East Side for more than two decades."

Newton has admitted to receiving treatment for a crack cocaine habit in 1995 while in the state Senate.

== 2005 federal felony convictions for corruption ==
During his seventeen years in the state Legislature, Newton "was known for high-flown rhetoric, at one point describing himself as 'the Moses of my people' and 'God's faithful servant.'" Newton is also known for his flamboyant clothing, wearing colorful tailored suits with matching shoes.

Newton pleaded guilty in federal court on September 20, 2005, to charges of bribery, mail fraud and evasion of federal income tax. Newton admitted to taking a $5,000 bribe secure $100,000 in State Bond Commission grant funds for Progressive Training Associates Inc., a vocational training program, and to misappropriating $40,682 in campaign funds for his own expenses. The executive director of the Progressive Training Associates, Warren Keith Godbolt, who gave the bribe, was also convicted of bribery in 2005. Godbolt cooperated with investigators in their investigation of Newton and was sentenced to probation.

In February 2006, Newton was sentenced to five years in federal prison. In imposing the sentence, Senior U.S. District Court Judge Alan H. Nevas criticized Newton's "Moses" remark, saying, "I don't think there's any reference in the Bible ... that as God led his people for 40 years in the desert that he ever took money from them."

In February 2010, he was released from the federal prison camp in Lewisburg, Pennsylvania and moved to a halfway house in Waterbury, Connecticut.

== Unsuccessful political comeback attempts in 2012, 2014 and 2024 ==
In January 2012, after his release from prison, he announced that he would be seeking to return as the state Senator for the 23rd Senate district, his old seat. In May 2012, Newton received an endorsement from the Democratic Town Committee under Chairman Mario Testa to run for Senate. In the three-way August 2012 Democratic primary in August 2012, however, Newton lost to state Representative Andres Ayala, Jr., who received the endorsement of Mayor Bill Finch. Ayala also defeated incumbent senator Edwin A. Gomes. Ayala received 2,129 votes, Newton 1,739 votes, and Gomes 1,138 votes.

In 2014, Newton again unsuccessfully sought to make a political comeback, running for the 124th state House district. In March 2014, Newton again won the Democratic town committee nomination. However, Newton's opponent Andre F. Baker, Jr.—an undertaker, former Bridgeport city councilman, and board of education member—forced a Democratic primary by petition, and in the August 2014 primary election defeated Newton. Baker received the key support of Mayor Bill Finch. Baker received 697 votes to Newton's 430.

In 2024, Newton launched a primary bid against incumbent Democratic Senator of the 23rd district Herron Gaston, but lost the primary 71.61% to 28.39%.

== Campaign finance conviction ==
Newton was arrested in January 2013 on state campaign finance fraud charges.

On January 16, 2015, Newton was convicted of three charges of "illegal practices in campaign financing" and acquitted on a charge of witness tampering. The jury deadlocked on two other counts of illegal practices in campaign financing and two counts of first-degree larceny, and a mistrial was declared on those four charges.

On May 13, 2015, Newton was sentenced to three sentences of six months in jail, to run concurrently with each other, on the state charges. The state judge found that Newton received no personal financial benefit from the crime, and that the offense was a result of "his campaign's sloppiness and failure to keep track of how much it had raised"—a mitigating factor. The state judge freed Newton pending appeal and determined that if Newton was sent to prison for violating the terms of his federal probation (by committing the state campaign-finance offense), his six-month state sentence would run concurrently with his federal probation-violation sentence. Newton appeared in federal court in Hartford the next day.

In October 2018, the Connecticut Supreme Court overturned Newton's convictions for campaign finance violations, determining in a unanimous ruling that the jury instructions improperly omitted an intent element of the offense; the Supreme Court returned the case to the lower court for a new trial. In August 2019, Newton pleaded guilty to the same three felony campaign-finance charges of which he was convicted in 2015; he received a suspended sentence of 18 months. As part of the plea agreement, Newton acknowledged a "knowing and willful" violation of the law; speaking to the media afterward, he said that he accepted responsibility for whatever occurred within his campaign, but maintained he personally did nothing wrong.

== 2017 election to City Council ==
In 2017, Newton mounted a political comeback when he was elected to the City Council again from his East End district. He defeated Councilman James Holloway in the September primary election and then won the general election.

== Personal life ==
Newton is married; he and his wife Pamela have children.
