= Jerry Donal Jewell =

American dentist and politician

Jerry Donal Jewell (1930–2002) was an American dentist and politician who was the first African American to serve in the Arkansas Senate in the twentieth century. He also served as acting governor of Arkansas for four days while Governor James Guy Tucker was out of state to attend former governor Bill Clinton's inauguration as president of the United States. He was a Democrat.

Jewell was born on September 16, 1930, in Chatfield, Arkansas, and was one of five children (including four sisters, two of whom died in infancy) born to James M. Jewell and Ruth Lee Taylor Jewell, both sharecroppers who originated from Mississippi. By 1936, the family relocated to West Memphis, Arkansas, where his father held jobs with the Works Progress Administration and an oil company.

After making the honor roll in segregated schools and a boarding school, he attended Agricultural, Mechanical, and Normal College (now University of Arkansas at Pine Bluff) in 1949, where he majored in pre-medical and pre-dental. He furthered his college studies at Meharry Medical College in Nashville, Tennessee, graduating in 1957.
