= African-American officeholders (1900–1959) =

From 1900 to 1959 setbacks for African Americans occurred following the restoration of white supremacy and political control across the South. These Redeemers, who undid Reconstruction era policies, retook control of local, state, and federal offices, restoring white supremacy across the South in government and civil life. African-Americans were largely barred from voting and almost entirely obstructed from public office in former Confederate states under the Jim Crow regime. The following is a list of African-American holders of public office from 1900 to 1959

The era also saw the appointment or election of the first African-American women to serve in elected public office. Minnie Buckingham Harper became the first African-American woman to serve in a state legislature when she was appointed in 1928 to serve out the remainder of her husband's term in the West Virginia House of Delegates. Crystal Bird Fauset was the first Black woman elected to a legislature when was elected to the Pennsylvania House in 1938. African-American women were also elected or appointed to state legislatures in Alaska, Illinois, Maryland, Michigan, Maryland, New Jersey and New York.

The number of African American officeholders finally saw dramatic increases following the passage of the Civil Rights Act of 1964.

== Federal office ==
=== House of Representatives ===
- Oscar Stanton De Priest (1929-1935) from Chicago, Illinois
- Arthur Wergs Mitchell (1935-1943) from Chicago, Illinois
- William L. Dawson (1943-1970) from Chicago, Illinois
- Adam Clayton Powell Jr. (1945-1971) from New York City's Harlem neighborhood
- Charles Diggs (1955-1980) from Detroit, Michigan
- Robert N. C. Nix Sr. (1958-1979) from Philadelphia, Pennsylvania

== State office ==
=== Alaska ===
==== House ====
- Blanche McSmith (1959)

=== California ===
==== Assembly ====
- Frederick Madison Roberts (1918) representing Los Angeles, California
- Augustus Hawkins (1934-1960) representing Los Angeles, California

=== Colorado ===
==== Senate ====
- George L. Brown (1957), representing Denver M, Colorado. He also served as Lieutenant Governor

==== House ====
- George L. Brown (1955)

=== Connecticut ===
==== House ====
- Wilfred X. Johnson (1958), the Wilfred X. Johnson House where he lived is listed on the National Register of Historic Places

=== Delaware ===
==== House ====
- William J. Winchester (1948)

=== Georgia ===
==== House ====
- H. F. McKay, state representative from Liberty County (1900-1901)
- Lectured Crawford, state representative from McIntosh County (1886-1887, 1890–1891, 1900–1901)
- W. H. Rogers, state representative from McIntosh County (1902-1908)
- Amos Rogers
- Hercules Wilson (1882-1885)
- Anthony Wilson, state representative from Camden County, Georgia (1884-1888?) (?-1893)
- Frasier / Frazier, first name unknown, state representative from Liberty County, Georgia
- Samuel A. McIvor, state representative for Liberty County, Georgia

=== Illinois ===
==== Senate ====
- Adelbert H. Roberts (1924)
- William E. King (1934)
- William A. Wallace (1938)
- Christopher C. Wimbish (1942)
- Fred J. Smith (1954)

==== House ====
- John G. Jones (1900)
- Edward D. Green (1904)
- Alexander Lane (1907)
- Robert R. Jackson (1912)
- Sheadrick B. Turner (1914)
- Benjamin H. Lucas (1916)
- Warren B. Douglass (1918)
- George T. Kersey (1922)
- Charles A. Griffin (1924)
- William J. Warfield (1928)
- Charles J. Jenkins (1930)
- Harris B. Gaines (1930)
- Aubrey H. Smith (1934)
- Ernest A. Greene (1936)
- Richard A. Harewood (1936)
- Andrew A. Torrence (1938)
- Dudley S. Martin (1940)
- Corneal A. Davis (1943)
- Christopher C. Wimbish (1943)
- Charles T. Sykes (1944)
- Edward A. Welters (1944)
- James Y. Carter (1954)
- Kenneth E. Wilson (1954)
- William H. Robinson (1954)
- J. Horace Gardner (1956)
- Elwood Graham (1956)
- Floy Clements (1958)
- Cecil A. Partee (1957)
- Charles F. Armstrong (1957)

==== Local offices ====
- Oscar Stanton De Priest, Cook County Board of Commissioners (1904–1908), Chicago City Council (1915–1917, 1943–1947)
- Louis B. Anderson, Chicago City Council (1923-1933)
- William L. Dawson, Chicago City Council (1933-1939)
- Earl B. Dickerson, Chicago City Council (1939-1943)
- Claude Holman, Chicago City Council (1955-1973)

=== Indiana ===
==== Senate ====
- Robert Brokenburr (1940)

==== House ====
- Harry H. Richardson (1932)
- Robert L. Stanton (1932)
- Marshall A. Talley (1932)
- James S. Hunter (1940)
- Jesse L. Dickinson (1942, 1944)
- Wilbur H. Grant (1942)

=== Kansas ===
==== House ====
- W. M. Blount (1929-1930, 1933–1936)
- William H. Towers (1937-1939)

=== Kentucky ===
==== House ====
- Charles W. Anderson Jr. (1936), a lawyer in Louisville

=== Maryland ===
==== Senate ====
- Harry A. Cole (1955-1966)

==== House ====
- Emory Cole (1955)
- Truly Hatchett (1955)
- Verda Welcome (1958 )
- Irma George Dixon (1958 )

==== Local offices ====
- Walter T. McGuinn, lawyer who served on Baltimore's city council from 1919-1923 and 1927-1931

=== Massachusetts ===
==== House ====
- William H. Lewis (1902)

=== Michigan ===
==== Senate ====
- Charles A. Roxborough (1930)
- Charles Diggs Sr. (1937-1944)
- Cora Brown (1952)

==== House ====
- James W. Ames (1901)
- Horace A. White (1941)
- Charline White (1950)

==== Local office ====
- William T. Patrick, Detroit City Council (1957-1963)

=== Missouri ===
==== House ====
- Walthall M. Moore (1921)
- Edwin F. Kenswil (1943)
- William A. Massingale (1947-1948)
- Walter V. Lay (1949-1954)
- James Troupe Sr. (1954)

=== Nebraska ===
==== Senate, then Unicameral Legislature ====
- John Adams Jr. (1937)

==== House (prior to 1937) ====
- T. L. Barnett (1924)
- A. A. McMillan (1924)
- John Andrew Singleton (1927)
- Johnny Owen (1933)
- John Adams Jr. (1935)

=== New Jersey ===
==== General Assembly ====
- Walter G. Alexander (1920)
- Oliver Randolph (1922)
- James L. Baxter (1927)
- Frank S. Hargrave (1930-1931, 1933–1935, 1937-?, 1938–1942)
- J. Mercer Burrell (1933-1937)
- Guy R. Moorehead (1937-)
- James Otto Hill (1943-1947)
- Madaline A. Williams (1957)

=== New York ===
==== Assembly ====
- Edward A. Johnson (1917)
- John C. Hawkins (1919)
- Henri W. Shields (1922)
- Pope B. Billups (1925)
- Lamar Perkins (1930)
- Francis E. Rivers (1930)
- James E. Stevens (1930)
- William T. Andrews (1934)
- Robert W. Justice (1935)
- Daniel Burrows (1938)
- Hulan E. Jack (1940)
- William E. Prince (1944)
- Bessie A. Buchanan (1955)

==== Judiciary ====
- James S. Watson, New York City Municipal Court (1930–1950)
- Jane Bolin, New York City Domestic Relations Court (1939–1979; appointed)
- Harold A. Stevens, Court of General Sessions (1950–1955); Supreme Court (1955–1958); Appellate Division, First Department (1958–1974)

==== Senate ====
- Julius A. Archibald (1953)

==== Local office ====
- Charles H. Roberts, New York City Board of Aldermen (1920–1921)
- George W. Harris, New York City Board of Aldermen (1920–1923)
- Adam Clayton Powell Jr., New York City Council (1942–1945)
- Benjamin J. Davis Jr., New York City Council (1945–1949)

=== Ohio ===
==== House ====
- George W. Hayes (1901)
- H. T. Eubanks (1904)
- A. Lee Beaty (1919)
- Henry Higgins (1919)
- Harry E. Davis (1921)
- E. W. B. Curry (1924)
- Perry B. Jackson (1928)
- Chester K. Gillespie (1933-1935, 1943–1945)
- Richard P. McClain (1934)
- David D. Turpeau (1940)
- Sandy F. Ray (1942)
- Jacob Ashburn Sr. (1944)

==== Local office ====
- Thomas W. Fleming, Member, Cleveland City Council

=== Oklahoma ===
==== House ====
- A. C. Hamlin (1908)

=== Pennsylvania ===
==== House ====
- Harry W. Bass (1911)
- John C. Asbury (1920)
- Andrew F. Stephens (1920)
- William H. Fuller (1924)
- Samuel B. Hart (1924)
- Walter E. Tucker (1930)
- John William Harris (1932)
- Homer S. Brown (1934)
- Richard A. Cooper (1934)
- Walter K. Jackson (!934)
- Hobson R. Reynolds (1935-1936, 1939–1940)
- Marshall L. Shephard (1935-1938, 1941–1942)
- William A. Allmond (1936)
- John H. Brigerman (1937-1938, 1943–1944)
- Samuel D. Holmes (1936)
- Edwin F. Thompson (1936)
- E. Washington Rhodes (1938)
- Crystal Bird Fauset (1938)
- Ralph T. Jefferson (1940)
- Edward C. Young (1940)
- Dennie W. Hoggard (1943-1946, 1949–1954)
- Lewis M. Mintess (1943-1944, 1947–1952)
- Thomas P. Trent (1943-1946, 1950–1951)
- Lee P. Myhan (1945-1946)
- J. Thompson Pettigrew (1945-1946, 1949–1956)
- William A. Upshur (1947-1948)
- Garfield B. Harris (1953-1954)
- Susie Monroe (1949-1968)

=== Vermont ===
==== House ====
- William J. Anderson (1944)

=== Washington ===
==== House ====
- John H. Ryan (1933)
- Charles Stokes

=== West Virginia ===
==== House ====
- James M. Ellis (1902)
- Howard Railey (1904)
- Ebenezer Howard Harper (1917)
- Harry J. Capehart (1919–1925)
- Minnie Buckingham Harper (1928, appointed)

=== Wisconsin ===
==== Assembly ====
- Lucian H. Palmer (1906)
- Cleveland Moland Colbert (1942), elected but decertified after recount
- Leroy J. Simmons (1944)

== See also ==
- African American officeholders from the end of the Civil War until before 1900
