= W. H. Rogers =

American politician

Member of the Georgia House of Representatives from the McIntosh County district
- In office 1902–1907
- Succeeded by: F. H. McFarlane

Personal details
- Party: Republican
- Profession: Politician

W. H. Rogers was an American politician. He was a state legislator in Georgia and was the only African-American to serve in the 99th Georgia State Assembly. He represented McIntosh County, Georgia from 1902 until 1907.

== Political career ==
Rogers was elected to represent McIntosh County, Georgia in the 99th Georgia State Assembly and took office in 1902. He was the only African American serving in the 99th Assembly. His racist opponents launched a campaign against him using the slogan "Redeem McIntosh County." He ran for re-election in 1904 and 1906, winning both elections.

He resigned in 1907 when a bill to disenfranchise African Americans passed in Georgia's legislature. It was signed in 1907 by Georgia governor Hoke Smith. Rogers sent his resignation letter directly to Smith. In 1908, the Macon Telegraph stated that Rogers would be "perhaps the last [negro] that will have had a seat in the General Assembly of Georgia."

Rogers was the last African American to serve in Georgia's legislature until 1963 when Leroy Johnson was elected to the Georgia Senate.

== See also ==
- List of African-American officeholders (1900–1959)
- 128th Georgia General Assembly
- Tunis Campbell
- Lectured Crawford
- H. A. McKay
