= Charles Griffin (disambiguation) =

Charles Griffin (1825–1867) was a U.S. Army officer and Union general.

Charles or Charlie Griffin may also refer to:

- Charles A. Griffin (born 1884), American politician
- Charles Griffin (baseball) (fl. 1887), American baseball player
- Charles Griffin (Hudson's Bay Company), person involved in the Pig War
- Charles D. Griffin (1906–1996), U.S. Navy admiral
- Charles H. Griffin (1926–1989), U.S. representative from Mississippi
- Charlie Griffin (footballer) (born 1979), English footballer
- Charlie Griffin (rugby union) (born 2005), English rugby union player
