= Massingale =

Massingale is a surname. Notable people with the surname include:

- C. J. Massingale (born 1982), American-Australian basketball player
- Garcia Massingale (1928–1990), American Negro league baseball player
- Sam C. Massingale (1870–1941), American politician
- William Massingale, American politician
