= Wilbur Grant =

American politician (1897–1983)

Member of the Indiana House of Representatives
- In office November 4, 1942 – November 3, 1948
- Succeeded by: Forrest Littlejohn

Personal details
- Born: Wilbur Homer Grant; December 11, 1897 New Albany, Indiana, U.S.
- Died: August 25, 1983 (aged 85)
- Party: Republican
- Education: Scribner High School
- Occupation: Politician, lawyer, judge

Wilbur Homer Grant (December 11, 1897 – August 25, 1983) was an American lawyer, judge, and state legislator from Indiana. He was a veteran and a Republican. He represented Indianapolis in Marion County in the Indiana House of Representatives from 1943 to 1947. He was succeeded by Forrest W. Littlejohn.

He was born in New Albany, Indiana, and graduated from Scribner High School in 1916. He moved to Indianapolis to study law, and in 1926 he received his LL.B. from the school later known as the IU McKinney School of Law.

He represented Marion County, Indiana in the Indiana House of Representatives as a Republican from November 4, 1942, until November 3, 1948. He was African American.

Grant served two four-year terms in the Marion County Superior Court, winning election in 1966 and 1970, but losing in 1974.

== See also ==
- List of African-American officeholders (1900–1959)
