= John M. Holzendorf =

American politician

Hon. John McCay Holzendorf, Sr.
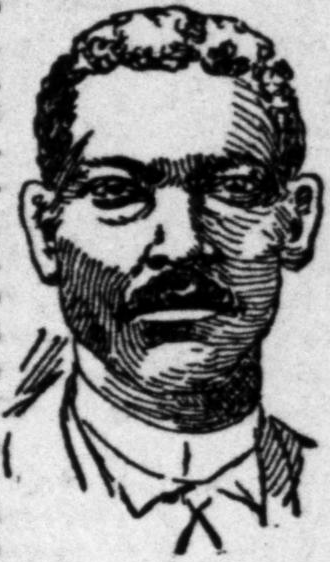

Member of the Georgia House of Representatives
- In office November 5, 1890 – October 15, 1891
- Preceded by: Alexander Lang
- Succeeded by: Anthony Wilson
- Constituency: Camden County

Collector for the Port of St. Marys
- In office 1903–1913
- Appointed by: Theodore Roosevelt
- Preceded by: B. Coffee

John McCay Holzendorf, Sr. (born c. 1857–1861) was an American politician from Camden County, Georgia. He represented Camden County in the Georgia House of Representatives in 1890 and 1891, one of only two African American representatives in the state House during those sessions. He was also a farmer and a schoolteacher. He was a member of the Republican Party.

== Early life and family ==
Holzendorf was born around 1857–1861, likely on the Berne Plantation or Benceville Plantation in Camden County, both of which were owned by members of the slaveowning Holzendorf family.

In the 1870 census, twelve-year-old Holzendorf was recorded as living in Camden County with farmer James Trueblood, two other Truebloods, and Dora and Morgan Holzendorf (both of whom were younger than him), in a neighboring house to his future wife, Lucilla Way (then eight years old). Holzendorf was attending school at the time. He was listed as a Mulatto, while Lucilla and her family were listed as Black.

Holzendorf married Lucilla Way on October 30, 1879.

The 1880 census recorded that Holzendorf lived in Jeffersonton with his mother-in-law, who was a widow who could not read or write, and his wife Lucilla. Holzendorf, who was listed as being 22 years old (like the 1870 census indicating a birth date in 1857 or 1858), and his wife, who was recorded as being fifteen, both did farm work. While Lucilla's mother was listed as Black, the Holzendorfs were listed as Mulattos.

According to the 1900 census, Holzendorf was born in January 1861, and his wife was born in December 1864.

John and Lucilla Holzendorf had five children, James A., John M., Chester A., Daisy L., and Lenora, born between 1881 and 1893.

== Political career ==
In the October 1890 elections, Holzendorf was elected to the Georgia House of Representatives as the representative of Camden County, which at the time had a population that was mostly African American. The Georgia Colored Farmers' Alliance was a voting bloc that was instrumental to Holzendorf's election. He was sworn into office on November 5, 1890. During his time in the state House of Representatives, he was appointed to the Committee on Education and the Special Agricultural Committee.

On November 20, 1890, Holzendorf voted for a bill to establish a school for colored persons as a branch of the State University, which passed.

In July 1891, Holzendorf and the other African American representative, Lectured Crawford, initially opposed a bill to require railroad companies to provide separate cars for white and black people, but then changed their minds and supported it; however Holzendorf proposed an amendment to additionally require that white people be prohibited from entering black cars and vice versa.

On September 18, 1891, Holzendorf voted against a bill to increase the cost of a liquor license from $50 to $200, but it passed the House 94 to 48.

Holzendorf "accorded himself with dignity while working tirelessly to improve the welfare of Negroes in Camden County." One Camden County resident recalled in 1973 that Holzendorf "was a politician, a very fine man who was concerned for the well being of his people. Mr. Holzendorf would keep us informed as what was happening in Camden County and the state." The Atlanta Constitution said "he is conservative in his utterances, and is an earnest worker for the good of the people of his race." In The Constitution's biographical sketches of the members of the House of Representatives, the white representatives were listed first in alphabetical order, with the two African American representatives, Lectured Crawford and Holzendorf, listed separately at the end as "The Colored Representatives."

Holzendorf, like other politically active African Americans, was denigrated and threatened by white supremacists. Bills that were intended to improve or protect African Americans' civil rights were typically blocked or killed in committee by white supremacist representatives.

In 1892, Holzendorf ran for the Georgia State Senate. In September, The Morning News speculated that Democratic vote-splitting might allow Holzendorf to win. In the election in October, he won the most votes in Camden County, but lost the election overall.

In 1893, Holzendorf ran for State Representative against incumbent Anthony Wilson, who was also African American, and Burwell Atkinson, who was white. The African American vote was split, leading to Atkinson's election.

In 1903, U.S. President Theodore Roosevelt appointed Holzendorf Collector for the Port of St. Marys, and he served in that position until 1913.
