= Holzendorf =

Holzendorf is a surname. Notable people with the surname include:

- Betty Holzendorf (1940–2024), American politician
- John M. Holzendorf (born c. 1857–1861), American politician
