= Benjamin Lucas =

Benjamin or Ben Lucas may refer to:

- Benjamin Lucas (soldier), 17th-century English soldier
- Benjamin Lucas (French politician) (born 1990), member of Parliament
- Benjamin H. Lucas (1879–?), minister and state legislator in Illinois
- Ben Lucas (rugby union) (born 1987), Australian rugby union footballer
- Ben Lucas (wheelchair racer) (born 1965), New Zealand sports administrator and retired wheelchair racer
- Ben Lucas (lobbyist), co-owner of the lobbying firm LLM Communications
- Benjamin Lucas (rockstar)
