= Walter Jackson =

Walter Jackson may refer to:

- Walter Jackson (ice hockey)
- Walter Jackson (footballer), English footballer
- Walter Jackson (singer) (1938–1983), American soul music singer
- Walter Jackson, winner of the 2022 NAIDOC Award for Caring for Country and Culture
- Walter Jesse Jackson, English rugby union player
- Walter K. Jackson, member of the Pennsylvania House of Representatives
- Walter Montgomery Jackson, American encyclopedist
- Walter Clinton Jackson (1879–1959), American educator
- Wattie Jackson, Scottish footballer
