= William Towers =

William or Bill Towers may refer to:

- William Towers (rugby union) (1861–1904), English-born rugby union forward, capped twice for Wales
- William Towers (priest) (1681–1745), priest and academic, vice-chancellor of the University of Cambridge
- William H. Towers, Kansas state legislator in the United States
- William Towers (countertenor), English countertenor
- Bill Towers (politician) (1892–1962), Australian politician
- Bill Towers (footballer) (1920–2000), English footballer

== See also ==
- William Tower (disambiguation)
