= John Clifford Hawkins =

Prominent African American attorney and politician from New York

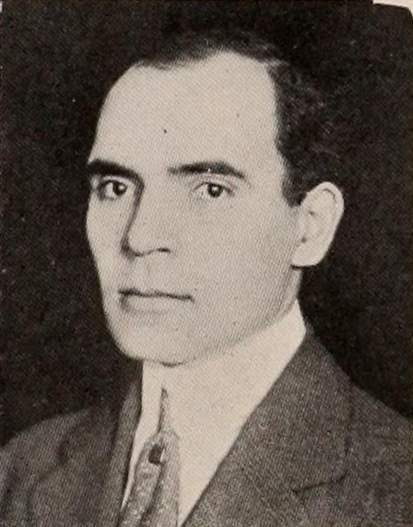
Hawkins's official State Assembly portrait, 1919

John Clifford Hawkins was a lawyer and politician in New York City during the early 20th century. He served in the New York Assembly and represented Harlem as a New York City alderman.

== Background ==
Hawkins was born in Middleburg, North Carolina, on March 29, 1879, the son of John and Sara Hawkins. In 1903, he graduated from Lincoln University. He studied law at New York University School of Law.

== Career ==
He was a member of the New York State Assembly (New York Co., 21st D.) in 1919, 1920 and 1921. He was the second African-American New York assemblyman after Edward A. Johnson in 1918. During his tenure, he worked alongside alderman Charles H. Roberts to secure an armory for the Harlem Hellfighters.

In 1927, he was elected an Alderman of the City of New York, representing the 21st District. He was one of two African Americans serving as aldermen in 1929 and was reportedly offered the minority leadership post but turned it down.

== See also ==
- List of African-American officeholders (1900–1959)
- Warren B. Douglass

New York State Assembly
Preceded by Harold C. Mitchell	New York State Assembly; New York County, 21st District; 1919–1921	Succeeded by Horace W. Palmer
