= William Tower =

William Tower is the name of:

- William Lawrence Tower (1872-?), American zoölogist
- William Hogarth Tower (1871–1950), collector

== See also ==
- William Towers (disambiguation)
