= Sandy F. Ray =

American minister (1898–1979)

Sandy Frederick Ray (1898-1979) was a pastor of Baptist churches, a community leader, and a state legislator in Ohio. He served in the Ohio House of Representatives. The New York Public Library has a collection of his papers. He was pastor of the Cornerstone Baptist Church in Brooklyn. He wrote the book Journeying through a Jungle, which was published in 1979.

He was born in Texas. He was a friend of Martin Luther King Jr.

== See also ==
- List of African-American officeholders (1900–1959)
