= Aldena Windham Davis Smith =

American singer

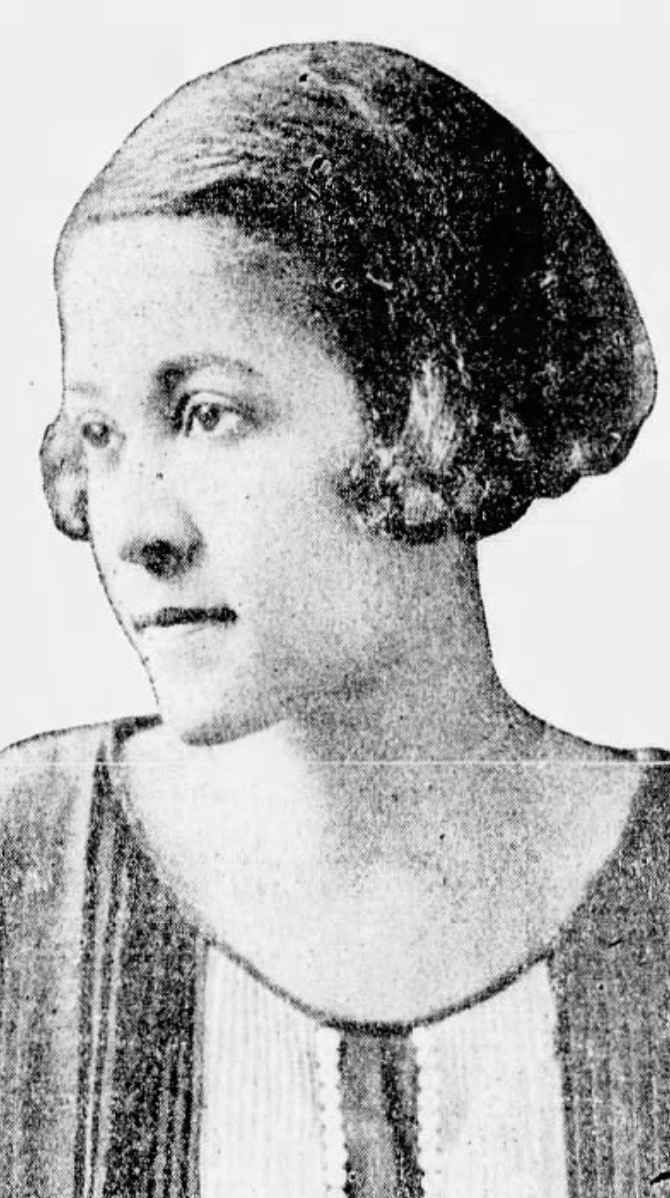
- Aldena Windham, from a 1927 newspaper
- Born: Aldena Lydia Windham; Birmingham, Alabama
- Occupations: Singer, music educator, choral director, organist

Aldena Windham Davis Smith was an American singer, music educator, and choral director. She performed with the Fisk Jubilee Singers in the 1920s, and was director of music at Virginia Union University from 1931 to 1942.

== Early life ==
Aldena Lydia Windham was born in Birmingham, Alabama, the daughter of Ben L. Windham and Loretta R. Windham. Her parents were both born in Louisiana; her father was a contractor, and her mother was a clubwoman, teacher, and business manager.

She attended Fisk University, and graduated from Howard University in 1926. She was a member of Delta Sigma Theta, and in 1937 was a charter member of the sorority's Richmond alumnae chapter. She earned a master's degree in music education from Northwestern University.

== Career ==
Windham sang with the Fisk Jubilee Singers, including a 1922 performance at the National Music Supervisors Conference in Nashville. She was organist at Sixth Avenue Baptist Church in Birmingham and a teacher and librarian at the city's Industrial High School before she married.

Davis was Director of Music at the Virginia Union University in 1931 from 1942. She led the school's chorus in concerts including radio concerts, performances in Michigan, New York, Ohio, and Pennsylvania, and an appearance at the Virginia State Conference of the NAACP in 1942. She was music consultant for the Richmond Public Schools, and in 1945 was appointed State Supervisor of Music in Negro Schools in Virginia.

In East St. Louis after her second marriage, Smith was director of a day care center, and served on a state advisory committee on day care standards.

== Personal life ==
In 1929, she married Llewellyn Davis and moved to Richmond, Virginia. They had a daughter, Elvia. She married one of her Fisk University friends, dentist and politician Aubrey Hinton Smith, in 1951, and moved to East St. Louis.
