= Louis B. Anderson =

American politician (1870–1946)

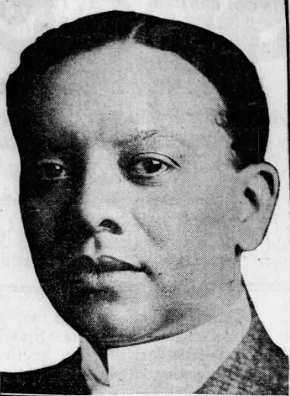
- Alderman Anderson depicted in the Chicago Tribune, 1921

Alderman of the Chicago City Council from the 2nd ward
- In office 1917–1933 Serving with Hugh Norris (1917–1918); Robert R. Jackson (1918–1923)
- Preceded by: Oscar Stanton De Priest
- Succeeded by: William L. Dawson

Personal details
- Born: April 17, 1870 Petersburg, Virginia, U.S.
- Died: May 28, 1946 (aged 76) Chicago, Illinois, U.S.
- Party: Republican

Louis Bernard Anderson (April 17, 1870 – May 28, 1946) was an American politician who served as alderman of Chicago's 2nd ward from 1917 to 1933. A Republican, he served most of the Douglas community area, including much of the African-American neighborhood of Bronzeville. He was a prominent ally of mayor William Hale Thompson, and served as his floor leader throughout the 1920s.

== Early life ==
Born on April 17, 1870, in Petersburg, Virginia, Anderson moved to Washington, D.C., in 1889 to work in journalism as an exchange reader, and journalist. At some point he was employed by the newspaperman Major Moses P. Handy; when Handy was appointed promoter general of the World's Columbian Exposition in 1892, he would follow him to Chicago as his assistant.

After working as Handy's assistant Anderson worked as a secretary for Buffalo Bill, following the showman's Wild West Show to its ranch in North Platte, Nebraska. Unsatisfied with prairie life he returned to Chicago and attended the Chicago-Kent College of Law. After graduating in 1897 he befriended Robert S. Abbott, threatening a printer with the loss of city contracts unless it employed Abbott, and became a contributing editor of Abbott's Chicago Defender. He then became an attorney, serving as a county attorney and assistant corporation counsel under Mayor Fred Busse.

He was the victim of an attempted robbery at 29th Street and Wabash Avenue on March 1, 1905. He was not intimidated and was armed. He shot one of the two assailants through his overcoat, the bullet passing through his lung, mortally wounding him.

== Political career ==
A Republican, Anderson was elected to represent Chicago's 2nd ward in 1917, becoming Chicago's second African-American alderman after his predecessor Oscar Stanton De Priest. De Priest had resigned in scandal after being indicted of accepting a bribe from a gambling establishment, of which he would eventually be acquitted. Anderson was one of four African-American candidates for the office and was backed by City Hall and De Priest supporters. His main opponent in the race was William Rudolph Cowan, an African-American real-estate broker who had the backing of reformers. He won the contest, joining fellow Republican Hugh Norris in representing the 2nd ward on the City Council. De Priest attempted to retake his seat in 1918 but narrowly fell in the Republican primary to Major Robert R. Jackson, (Note: Anderson did not run, as Chicago aldermen served staggered two-year terms at the time.) who would go on to win the general election.

Throughout the 1920s he was a prominent ally of mayor William Hale Thompson and served as his floor leader in the Council. "Big Bill" Thompson had previously been alderman of the 2nd ward from 1900 to 1902 and was immensely popular with the city's African-American community. In 1921, when R. E. Parker of the Chicago Advocate confronted Thompson with the problems of 20,000 unemployed African-Americans and charged that the 2nd ward was full of graft and corruption, Anderson defended the mayor, calling Parker a "trouble maker among his own people", denying allegations of racism in Thompson's layoff practices, and responding to the charges of graft thus:

If he has the proof why doesn't he take it to the grand jury? There is no use to worry the mayor with it. The grand jury is investigating crime conditions in Chicago now, and I'm sure [it] would be glad to get evidence such as Parker says he has.

In 1922 he had the architects Michaelsen & Rognstad, build him a house at 3800 S. Calumet, the surrounding area would take on the name of this house Bronzeville.

Also in 1922 Anderson served on a committee looking into the Ku Klux Klan's alleged activities in the City's affairs, he and two other aldermen announced to the press that they had received death threats.

In 1923 Chicago's wards were increased from 35 to 50, while the number of aldermen per ward was decreased from two to one. Jackson was redistricted to the new 3rd ward, while Anderson kept his 2nd ward seat. In 1923 he was implicated in collecting more than $15,000 (Note: $220,000 in 2018) in protection money in the span of twenty months from a black and tan resort. In light of a related grand jury investigation, an illness, and the fact that Thompson declined to seek re-election that year, it was rumored that he would step down as alderman as well. He still contested the election and won with a majority of 1,037 votes, defeating eight opponents to avoid a runoff.

Democrat William Emmett Dever was elected mayor in 1923; Anderson opposed his 1924 budget, claiming that his proposed reclassification of hundreds of civil service jobs was meant to eliminate the current civil service workers. In that same year he served as a delegate to the 1924 Republican National Convention. Upon Thompson's return to the mayoral office following the 1927 election rumor had it that Anderson was likely to receive the "prize plum" of the chairmanship of the Council's finance committee, but Council Democrats worked to keep him off the committee and it seemed likely that the position would go instead to 30th ward alderman John Clark.

In the 1931 election he initially had five opponents, but rulings by the board of election commissioners invalidated the nominating petitions for all of them, leaving him unopposed. In that year's mayoral election he abandoned Thompson, whose popularity had plummeted due to crime and the Great Depression and who would be decisively defeated in the contest by Democrat Anton Cermak. Nevertheless, the 2nd ward was one of five in the city that voted Thompson, and having campaigned expressly against Anderson Cermak removed him from the finance committee. Later in the year he considered running for the United States House of Representatives against De Priest, then the only African-American in Congress. The Chicago Review, despite its dislike for De Priest, suggested that such a course of action was ill-advised, a conclusion also reached by The New York Age.

He did not run for re-election in 1933, and was succeeded in office by William L. Dawson, who had the backing of the De Priest organization. In 1936 he ran for the Republican nomination for Illinois's 1st congressional district, falling to De Priest. De Priest would in turn lose to Democrat Arthur Wergs Mitchell.

== Personal life ==
Anderson was a partner of Chicago-based Anderson-Watkins Film Co., which in 1913 produced and distributed a three-reel film known as A Day at Tuskegee. Anderson was married to Julia E. Anderson prior to her death in 1931. He eloped with Oneita Starks in 1933, remaining married to her until his death.

Having been ill since Christmas, he died in his Chicago home on May 28, 1946, of bronchial pneumonia. Services were held in St. Thomas' Episcopal Church on June 1.

== See also ==
- List of Chicago aldermen since 1923

== Bibliography ==
- Michaeli, Ethan (2016). The Defender: How the Legendary Black Newspaper Changed America. Boston, Massachusetts and New York, New York: Houghton Mifflin Harcourt. ISBN 978-0-547-56069-4.
- Schottenhamel, George (1952). "How Big Bill Thompson Won Control of Chicago". Journal of the Illinois State Historical Society. 45 (1): 30–49. JSTOR 40189189.
