= James Y. Carter =

Illinois politician

Member of the Illinois House of Representatives

Personal details
- Party: Democratic

James Young Carter was a lawyer and state representative in Illinois. He was a Democrat.

From 1956 to 1972 he served in the Illinois House of Representatives. He served a commissioner of the Public Vehicle Commission of Chicago from 1960 to 1975. In 1978 he was convicted of extortion and sentenced to seven years in prison.

== See also ==
- William L. Dawson (politician)
