= John Cornelius Asbury =

American politician

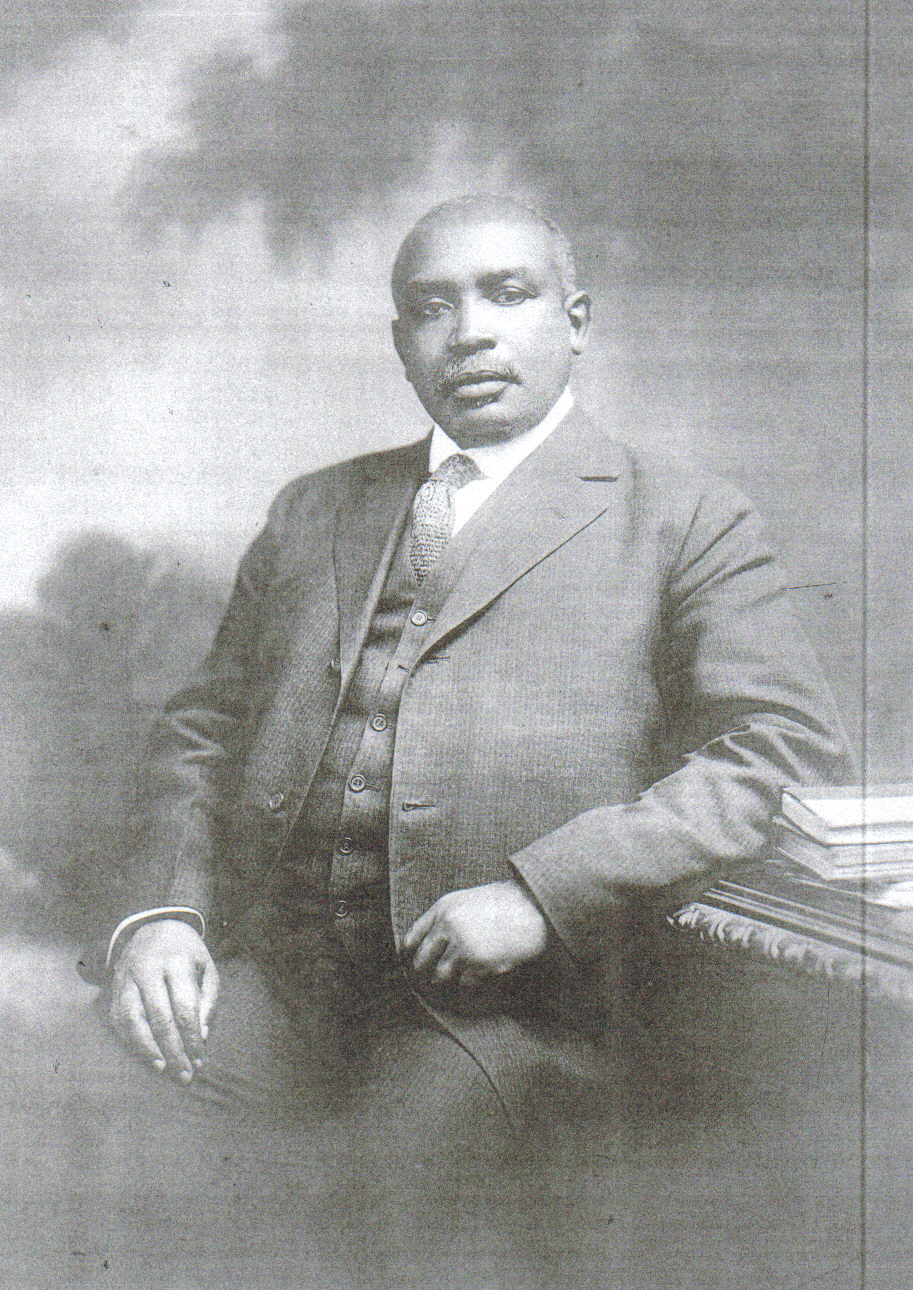

Member of the Pennsylvania House of Representatives
- In office 1921–1925

Personal details
- Born: April 9, 1862 West Middletown, Washington County, Pennsylvania
- Died: September 8, 1941 (aged 79)
- Resting place: Eden Cemetery, Collingdale, Pennsylvania
- Party: Republican
- Education: Washington & Jefferson College; Howard University School of Law

John Cornelius Asbury (April 9, 1862 – September 8, 1941) was an American lawyer and state legislator in Pennsylvania. A Republican, he served two terms in the Pennsylvania General Assembly in the 1920s and sponsored civil rights bills.

== Formative years and family ==
A brother of Isaac E. Asbury, John C. Asbury studied at Washington and Jefferson College and received a law degree from Howard University in 1885.

He married Kate E. Allen in 1886. After she died in 1898, he married Ida Elizabeth Bowser in 1901. Their son was David Bowser Asbury.

== Career ==
Early in his career, he served as a Commonwealth's Attorney (similar to District Attorney) in Norfolk County, Virginia from 1887 to 1891. He later moved to Philadelphia, Pennsylvania, where he practiced law.

He was appointed to serve as assistant city solicitor in Philadelphia from 1916 to 1920. He served in the Pennsylvania House of Representatives from 1921 to 1924. He authored civil rights bills in the Pennsylvania General Assembly and founded Eden Cemetery in Collingdale, Pennsylvania for African Americans.

He did not run for a third term in 1924. From 1928 to 1932, he served as the assistant district attorney of Philadelphia. Then, he served as the deputy auditor general in the office of the Pennsylvania Auditor General from 1932 to 1937.

He supported Downingtown Industrial School and Mercy Hospital.

== See also ==
- List of African-American officeholders (1900–1959)
