= Hercules Wilson =

American politician

Member of the Georgia House of Representatives from the Georgia's 2nd House of Representatives district

Personal details
- Born: Georgia, U.S.
- Party: Republican
- Occupation: Brickmason
- Profession: Politician

Hercules Wilson was an American politician. He represented McIntosh County, Georgia in the Georgia House of Representatives from 1882 until 1885.

== Early life ==
Hercules Wilson was born in Georgia. He had at least one sibling, Anthony Wilson.

== Career ==
Wilson was a brickmason. He ran to represent McIntosh County, Georgia in the Georgia House of Representatives in 1882. He was endorsed by Tunis Campbell. Wilson won the election.

He ran for re-election in 1884. During the election, the Union and Recorder in Milledgeville noted that: "He will feel lonesome having no one of his color to keep him company." He won re-election and served a second term through 1885. His brother Anthony also won election and served during this term. While in the House, Wilson lived with his brother Anthony and other fellow African-American legislator with the last name Frasier from Liberty County, Georgia.

== See also ==
- African American officeholders from the end of the Civil War until before 1900
- African-American officeholders (1900–1959)
