= Edward Alexander Welters =

Dentist, businessman, state legislator, civil rights activist

Edward Alexander Welters (1887–1964) was a dentist, businessman, state legislator, and civil rights advocate. He was born in Key West, Florida, moved to the Bronzeville section of St. Augustine, and later moved his business to Chicago, Illinois. He was a target of FDA inspections. He described being refused treatment at a University of Chicago hospital because he was black. The Chicago History Museum has a collection of his papers including correspondence.

As a representative he appears in an All-American News film.

== See also ==
- List of African-American officeholders (1900–1959)
