= George T. Kersey =

Illinois politician

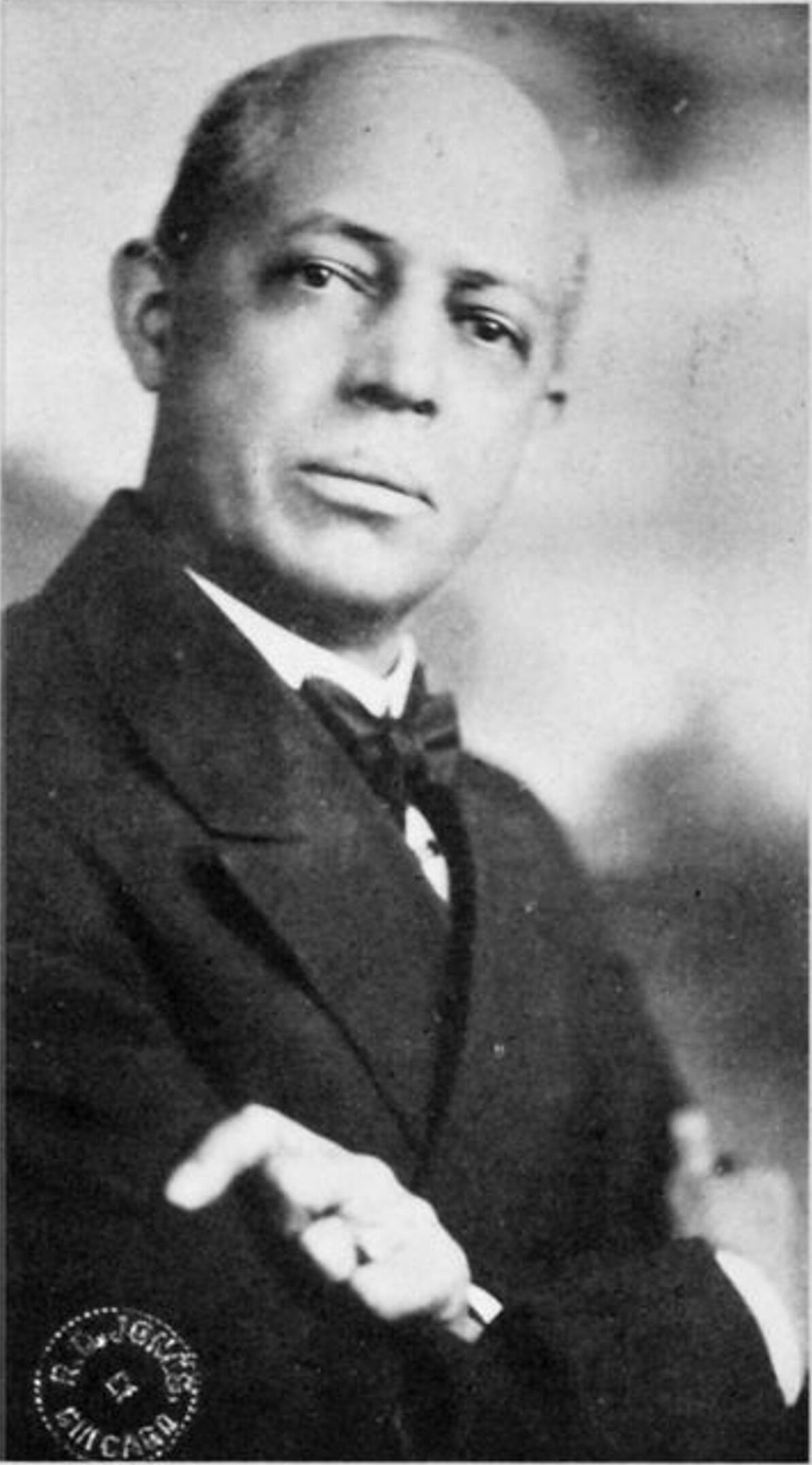

Member of the Illinois House of Representatives
- In office 1923–1925
- In office 1927–1931

Personal details
- Born: c. 1866 or 1867
- Died: January 6, 1946 Chicago, Illinois, U.S.
- Party: Republican

George T. Kersey (c. 1866 or 1867 – January 8, 1946) was a state legislator in Illinois. He was a Republican who served in the Illinois House of Representatives from 1923 to 1925 and from 1927 to 1931. He was an undertaker. The New York Public Library has a photograph of him. W. E. B. Du Bois wrote to him requesting a biographical account of Kersey's life.

In 1923 he supported a successful bill for a monument to African American veterans in Chicago. Victory Monument is in Bronzeville. His address was listed as 3515 Indiana Avenue in Douglas, Chicago,

He died in Chicago at age 80.

== See also ==
- List of African-American officeholders (1900–1959)
