= James Troupe =

American politician

James Troupe Sr. (December 4, 1909 – January 26, 1994) was a state legislator in Missouri. He served in the Missouri House of Representatives from 1954 to 1960 and from 1962 to 1972. He was born in Dublin, Georgia. A Democrat, he represented St. Louis. He married Gertrude Thompson.

== See also ==
- List of African-American officeholders (1900–1959)
