= Christopher C. Wimbish =

American lawyer and politician

Member of the Illinois Senate from the 3 district
- In office 1942–1955

Personal details
- Born: February 6, 1895
- Died: December 27, 1962 (aged 67)
- Party: Republican (1895-1938); Democrat (1938-1962)
- Spouse: Odessa Ireland
- Education: Northwestern University Pritzker School of Law
- Occupation: Lawyer
- Profession: Politician

Christopher Columbus Wimbish, Jr. (February 6, 1895 – December 27, 1962) was an American lawyer and politician. He served in the Illinois State Senate from 1942 through 1955. He was a Democrat.

== Early life and education ==
Wimbish was born in 1895 in Atlanta, Georgia. His parents were educator Maggie Baker Wimbish and politician Christopher C. Wimbish Sr. Wimbish Sr. was a Republican. Wimbish Jr. attended Houston Street Public School. Wimbish attended Atlanta University. In 1914, he graduated from Howard University. Wimbish then return to Atlanta and was involved with the life insurance business.

He volunteered to serve in the United States Army during World War I in 1917. He served as a first lieutenant at Camp Funston, Kansas, and in France with the 366th Brigade of the 92nd Division. The African-American 336th Brigade saw action in Argonne Forest, Lorraine and Alsace. After the Armistice of 11 November 1918, Wimbish spent time in France for three months and then returned home to the United States aboard the RMS Aquitania in February 1919. He was honorably discharged two months later in April 1919. After the war, he moved to Philadelphia and bought a theater called the Idle Hour Theater. He owned it until 1923.

== Career and life ==
After selling the theater, Wimbish moved to Chicago Illinois. He graduated from the Northwestern University Pritzker School of Law in 1925. He was worked at the law firm Temple, Wimbish, and McLendon. During his legal career, he was involved in criminal, property, and civil rights law. In 1927, he became an Illinois assistant state's attorney. He left that position in 1931. In 1940, he worked for the City of Chicago as assistant corporation counsel. He left that position in 1941. Wimbish also served as an assistant to a Chief Justice of the Chicago Municipal Court.

Wimbish married Chicago Public Schools teacher Odessa Ireland.

=== Illinois State Senate ===
In the late 1930s, Wimbish left the Republican Party and became a Democrat. In 1938, sought the Democratic nomination for the Illinois State Senate. He failed. In 1942, he tried again, and with strong support from the Democratic Party, he became a state senator. He represented the third district. He was re-elected twice, serving until 1955. He lost party support after a conflict with William L. Dawson and was not offered the 1954 nomination by the Democrats. During his tenure as a senator, he sponsored a bill called Fair Employment Practices. This was his biggest political achievement and one he considered most important. The bill passed in 1961. He gave speeches about racial discrimination, criminal confessions, voting rights and military service.

Wimbish was a member of the National Colored Democratic Association and president of the United Colored Democratic Association of Illinois. As of 1953, he was the only Black person to serve in the state senate. Chicago Tribune columnist George Tagge called Wimbish "one of the best liked members of the legislature."

== Later life and legacy ==
In 1958, he ran for Trustee of the Chicago Sanitary District. He regained Democratic Party backing after the quarrel with William L. Dawson in 1954 and won the trustee election. He served in the position until his death in 1962. Wimbish and his wife lived in the Bronzeville neighborhood, before moving to the Kenwood neighborhood.

Wimbish was a member of the NAACP, Disabled American Veterans, the YMCA, the Royal Coterie of Snakes, the American Legion, the Original Forty Club, and Alpha Phi Alpha. Wimbish was Catholic and a member of the Corpus Christi Catholic Church in Bronzeville.

Wimbish died at his home in Kenwood, Chicago in 1962. He was buried in Oakland Cemetery in Atlanta, Georgia. Upon his death, the Chicago Tribune called him "a leader of the Chicago Negro community."

His papers are held in the collection of the Chicago History Museum.
