= Richard A. Cooper =

American politician

Richard A. Cooper (March 9, 1872 – October 9, 1956) was an American politician in Pennsylvania.

Cooper served from 1907 to 1920 on the Philadelphia City Council. During his tenure as a city councilor, he was involved in organizing Philadelphia's 50th anniversary celebration of the Emancipation Proclamation. A Republican, he served in the Pennsylvania House of Representatives in 1935. He is buried at the Eden Cemetery in Collingdale.

Cooper was born in Maryland. He worked as an insurance agent.

== See also ==
- List of African-American officeholders (1900–1959)
