= Richard Pollard McClain =

American politician

Richard Pollard McClain (1890 - 1965) was a doctor, businessman, and state legislator in Ohio. Born in Nicholasville, Kentucky to Meredith and Ellen McClain, he lived in Cincinnati as a teenager. He studied at Cincinnati High School and Howard University. He married Alice E. Martin in 1918. He worked in Cincinnati.

He served on the city council in 1935 and 1937. He was accused of performing an illegal abortion. He was a Republican.

He was a dentist. He sponsored a bill prohibiting employment discrimination in the public sector.

== See also ==
- Chester K. Gillespie
