= E. H. Harper =

American politician

Ebenezer Howard Harper

Member of the West Virginia House of Delegates
- In office January, 1927 – December 2, 1927
- Succeeded by: Minnie Buckingham Harper

Personal details
- Born: August 4, 1864 Tazewell, Virginia, U.S.
- Died: December 2, 1927 (aged 63) Huntington, West Virginia, U.S.
- Party: Republican
- Spouse: Minnie Buckingham Harper

Ebenezer Howard Harper was a lawyer and state legislator in West Virginia.

He became a lawyer and was nominated from McDowell County. His office was in Keystone.

Howard Sutherland and Alfred S. Paull, an insurance businessman who was active in the Republican Party, corresponded about Harper seeking their political support.

He was elected in 1926. After he died in office governor Howard Gore appointed his wife, Minnie Buckingham Harper, to fill his seat.

== See also ==
- List of African-American officeholders (1900–1959)
