= William J. Warfield =

African-American military personnel

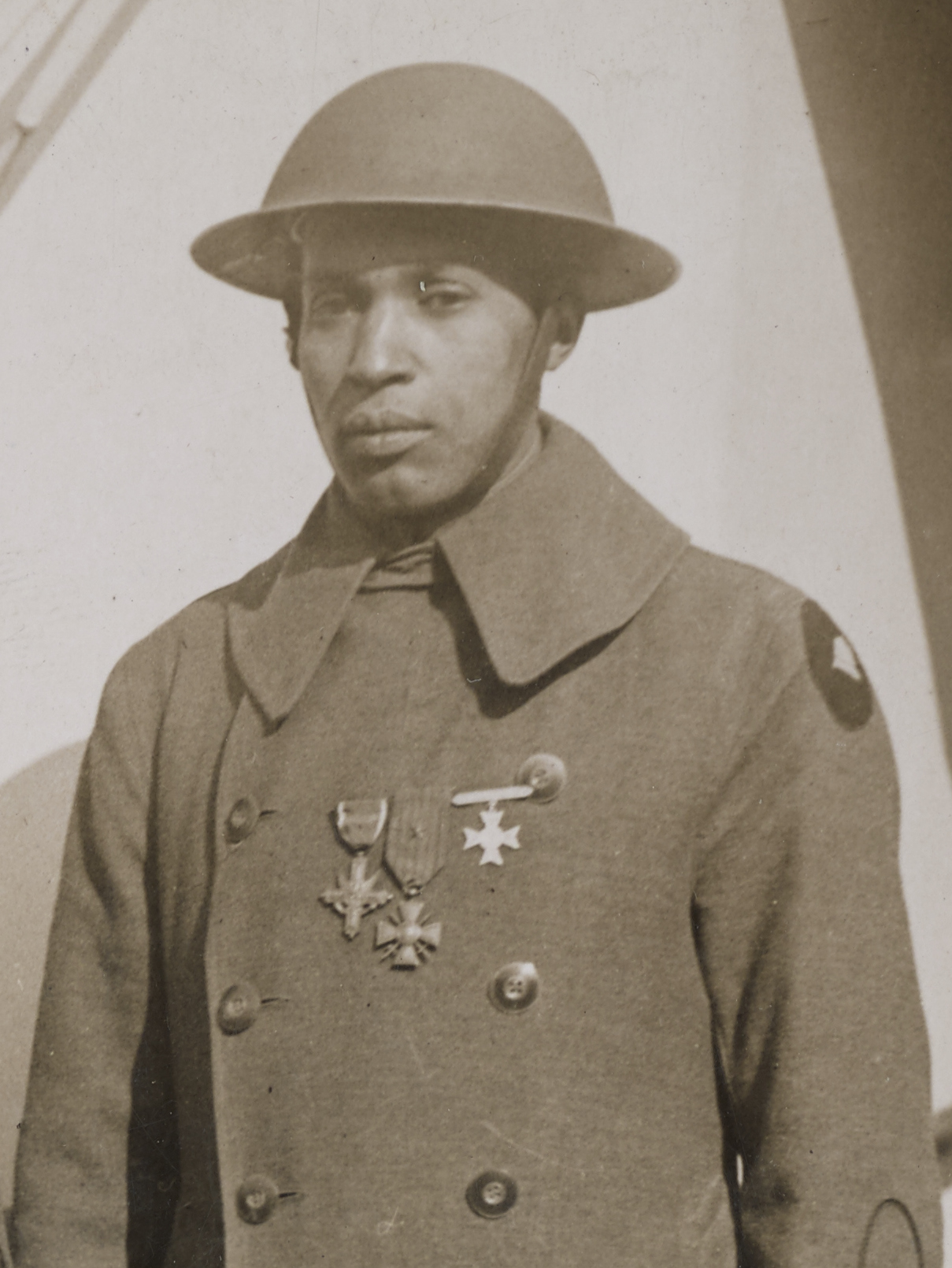

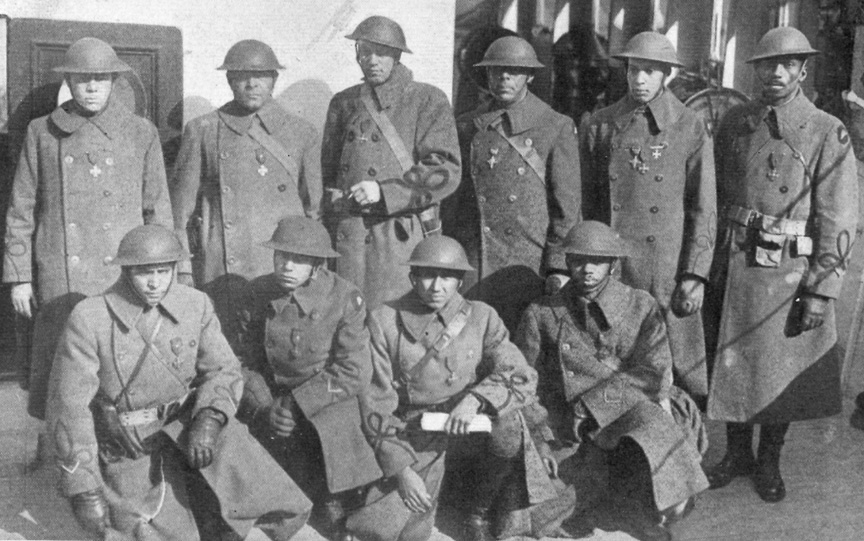

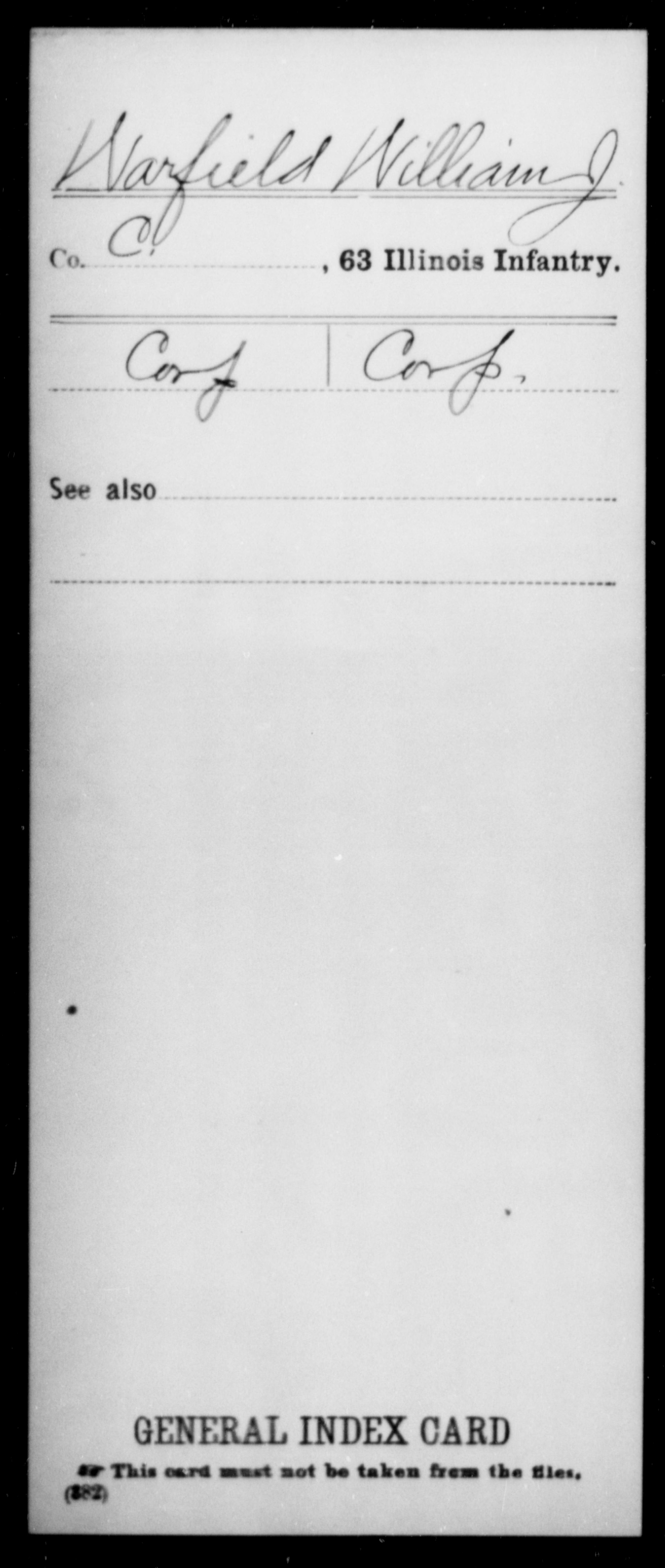

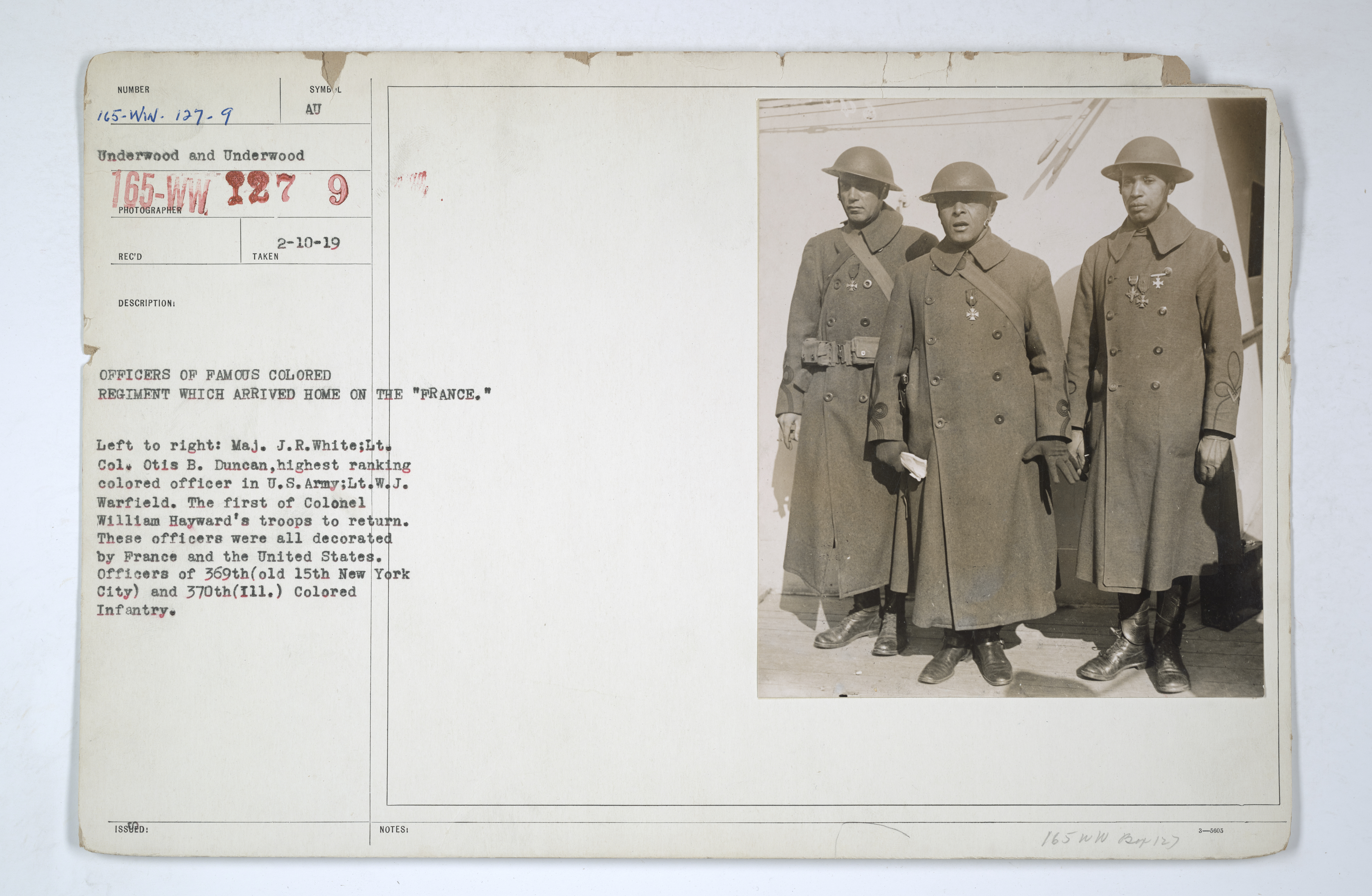

William J. Warfield (7 Jun 1883 - 12 Feb 1966), was an officer in the Illinois National Guard and a state legislator in Illinois. He represented part of Chicago. He was elected in 1928 to represent the 5th District.

He was a Lieutenant in the Illinois National Guard deployed to the Mexican border and then to Europe during World War I where his black unit was deployed under French command because of segregation. He became a Brigadier General in the Illinois National Guard. He was a Republican. He died at 82 years old.

He was photographed with fellow black officers Otis B. Duncan and J. R. White.

He was awarded the Distinguished Service Cross.

== See also ==
- List of African-American officeholders (1900–1959)
