= Frank Cella =

American Republican state legislator

Member of the Pennsylvania House of Representatives
- In office 1951–1952
- Constituency: Philadelphia

Personal details
- Born: December 3, 1888 Philadelphia, Pennsylvania, U.S.
- Died: February 7, 1965 (aged 76) Philadelphia, Pennsylvania, U.S.
- Resting place: Holy Cross Cemetery, Yeadon, Pennsylvania, U.S.
- Party: Republican

Frank Cella (December 3, 1888 – February 7, 1965) was a state legislator in Pennsylvania. He represented Philadelphia in the Pennsylvania House of Representatives during the 1951–1952 session. He was a Republican.

Born in Philadelphia, He became Philadelphia's receiver of taxes from 1932 to 1940. He also worked in the Recorder of Deeds office in Philadelphia from 1940 to 1952. He belonged to the 3rd Ward, 6th Division of the Republican Committee.

Cella was elected to the Pennsylvania House of Representatives for the 1951 term and then lost reelection for the 1953 term to Garfield B. Harris, an African American Democrat. He died, February 7, 1965, in Philadelphia and was interred at Holy Cross Cemetery in Yeadon, Pennsylvania.
