= Horace Alton White =

American politician

Horace Alton White (July 24, 1907 - February 10, 1958) was an American church leader and state legislator in Michigan. He served in the Michigan House of Representatives in 1941 and 1942. He was noted for his strong anti-violence position and his efforts in stopping the 1943 race riots.

He was born in Cave Spring, Georgia. He received his Doctor of Divinity in 1941 from Wilberforce University whilst a member of the legislator. He received his A.B. degree from Ohio Wesleyan University in 1946.

He died on February 10, 1958, and was survived by his wife Juanita, their three sons Peter, John, and Alton, and their daughter Ceilia.

== See also ==
- Detroit race riot of 1943
- List of African-American officeholders (1900–1959)
