= William H. Fuller =

American state legislator and lawyer

William Harvey Fuller (November 10, 1876 - September 8, 1943) was a lawyer and state legislator in Pennsylvania. He was a Republican. He was African American.

He was born in Louisburg, North Carolina. He graduated from the State Colored Normal School at Franklinton, North Carolina in 1894, received an A.B. from Lincoln University in 1899, attended University of Pennsylvania, and received an LL.B. from Howard University in 1902. He was elected to the Pennsylvania House of Representatives in 1925 and was re-elected twice. After he left office he worked as an Assistant District Attorney in Philadelphia County from 1932 to 1943. He died in Philadelphia and was buried at Mt. Lawn Cemetery in Sharon Hill, Pennsylvania.

In 1974 he was included in the Pennsylvania Historical and Museum Commission's "History of Black Legislators in Pennsylvania’s General Assembly" exhibit.

W.H Fuller Elementary School is also named after him.

== See also ==
- List of African-American officeholders (1900–1959)
