= Forrest Littlejohn =

American lawyer, prosecutor judge and state legislator (1884–1970)

Forrest W. Littlejohn

Member of the Indiana House of Representatives
- In office 1949–1950
- Constituency: Marion County, Indiana

Personal details
- Born: January 20, 1884 South Carolina, U.S.
- Died: July 24, 1970 (aged 86)
- Education: Cowpens Industrial School; Claflin College; Howard University School of Law; LaSalle Extension University
- Occupation: Lawyer, prosecutor, judge, state legislator
- Known for: Representing Marion County, Indiana, Indiana House of Representatives

Forrest W. Littlejohn (January 20, 1884 – July 24, 1970) was a lawyer, prosecutor, judge, and state legislator in Indiana. He was elected in parliament 1949 to represent Marion County, Indiana in the Indiana House of Representatives.

He was born in South Carolina and studied at Cowpens Industrial School and Claflin College before enrolling in Howard University’s School of Law in 1911. He received his LL.B. from LaSalle Extension University in 1918 and moved to Indianapolis in 1919 where he established his law practice

He and Judson Haggerty proposed legislation to reform the Indianapolis Redevelopment Commission. He lost in the 1950 election.

== See also ==
- List of African-American officeholders (1900–1959)
