= John H. Brigerman =

American politician (1902–1968)

John J. Brigerman

Member of the Pennsylvania House of Representatives
- In office 1943–1944
- In office 1937–1938

Personal details
- Born: December 11, 1902 Wyandotte County, Kansas, U.S.
- Died: August 2, 1968 (aged 65) Philadelphia, Pennsylvania, U.S.
- Resting place: Rolling Green Memorial Park, West Chester, Pennsylvania, U.S.
- Party: Democratic
- Education: John Marshall Law School; University of Indianapolis; Friendship N. & I. College; La Salle University
- Profession: Politician, lawyer, realtor

John H. Brigerman (December 11, 1902 – August 2, 1968) was a lawyer, realtor, and state legislator in Pennsylvania.

Birgerman was born in Wyandotte County, Kansas. He graduated from John Marshall Law School in Chicago and University of Indianapolis as well as Friendship N. & I. College and La Salle University. He was a delegate to the Indiana State Democratic Convention in 1928 and chaired the 47th Ward Democratic Executive Committee. A Democrat, he was elected to the Pennsylvania House of Representatives for the 1937 term and he also served in the Pennsylvania House in 1943. He ran unsuccessfully for 1939 and 1945 terms. He died in Philadelphia and is buried at Rolling Green Memorial Park in West Chester, Pennsylvania. He was included in a 1974 exhibition.

== See also ==
- List of African-American officeholders (1900–1959)
