= Dennie Hoggard =

Pastor and politictian from Pennsylvania

Dennie W. Hoggard Sr. (June 15, 1897 - January 13, 1968) was a pastor and state legislator in Pennsylvania. He was the pastor of Mount Carmel Baptist Church in Philadelphia.

Hoggard's son Dennie W. Hoggard Jr. played football for Penn State University (1946 Penn State Nittany Lions football team) and was a member of Alpha Phi Alpha fraternity. He played with Wallace Triplett They integrated the team and were the first African Americans to play in the Cotton Bowl.

== See also ==
- List of African-American officeholders (1900–1959)
