= Lee P. Myhan =

American politician (1901–1977)

Lee P. Myhan (March 16, 1901-1977) was an American politician in the state of Pennsylvania. He served in the Pennsylvania House of Representatives in 1945 and 1946. He was a member of the Democratic Party. He lost his re-election campaign.

Myhan was born in Lafayette, Alabama. He studied at Chambers County Training School, Tuskegee Institute from 1921-1927, and Georgia State College. He was a captain in the Reserve Officers' Training Corps from 1923-1927. He taught agriculture and edited the National Negro Farmer's Digest.

When he began his political campaigns he was a Customs Guard.

== See also ==
- List of African-American officeholders (1900–1959)
