= Garfield B. Harris =

American state legislator (born 1929)

Garfield B. Harris Sr. (born March 11, 1929) was an American administrator and state legislator in Pennsylvania in 1953. He was born in Philadelphia. A Republican he served in the Pennsylvania House of Representatives in 1953-1954. 616 South 12th Street was listed as his address.

He defeated the incumbent candidate, Republican Frank Cella.

== See also ==
- List of African-American officeholders (1900–1959)
