= Edwin Kenswil =

Missouri state legislator

Edwin F. Kenswil (1884 – February 19, 1957) was an American politician. He was born in Boston, Massachusetts in 1884. Kenswil was elected in 1942 to the Missouri House of Representatives and served a single term for the fourth district of St. Louis.

Liza Kenswil (c1886-1981), an NAACP official, was his wife. He proposed legislation to desegregate public venues in Missouri. He was the only African-American serving in Missouri's legislature.

== See also ==
- List of African-American officeholders (1900–1959)
