= H. F. McKay =

American politician

Member of the Georgia House of Representatives from the Georgia's 1st congressional district district

Personal details
- Party: Republican
- Profession: Politician

H. F. McKay (also documented as H. A. McKay) (fl. 1900) was an American politician. He and Lectured Crawford were elected to serve in the Georgia Legislature. He lived in Johnston Station, Georgia in Liberty County, Georgia. He was nominated to be the Republican candidate at their 1900 convention in Hinesville, Georgia.

== See also ==
- List of African-American officeholders (1900–1959)
