= James M. Ellis =

West Virginia politician

James M. Ellis was an African-American lawyer and politician who served in the West Virginia House of Delegates during the Reconstruction era. He lived in Oak Hill. T. L. Sweeney and J. H. Love were reported to be the only other "Colored" attorneys in Fayette County, West Virginia in the 1920s. He served three terms in the House of Delegates. He and the other African American legislators who served at the time were Republicans.

== See also ==
- Christopher H. Payne
