= Frank S. Hargrave =

American politician

Frank Settle Hargrave (1874–1942) was an American physician and Republican Party politician who served nine terms in the New Jersey General Assembly representing Essex County, New Jersey. He was among the first African Americans to serve in the New Jersey Legislature.

== Early life ==
He was born in Lexington, North Carolina, in 1874 and attended public schools there. He was a graduate of Shaw University and Leonard School of Medicine. He moved to Orange, New Jersey in 1924 and established a medical and surgical practice there. He served as president of the National Medical Association, the largest and oldest national organization representing African American physicians and their patients in the United States.

== Political career ==
Hargrave was elected to the New Jersey General Assembly in 1929 and was re-elected in 1930. He was defeated for re-election in 1931. He was again elected in 1933, but lost re-election in 1934. He won his seat back in 1935, but lost again in 1936. He was elected to a fourth tenure in the State Assembly in 1937, and was re-elected in 1938, 1939, 1940 and 1941. He died in office on March 11, 1942 at age 60.

== Family ==
In 1907, he married Bessie Parker of Wilson, South Carolina.
