= Warren B. Douglass =

American politician

Warren B. Douglass (January 25, 1886 – ?) was a state legislator in Illinois. He represented the 3rd District, 1919-23, 1925-29, 1935-37. A Republican, Ida B. Wells, ran as an independent against him.

He married and had a child.

== See also ==
- List of African-American officeholders (1900–1959)
