= Richard A. Harewood =

American lawyer, politician, and judge (1900–1985)

Richard Alexander Harewood (June 25, 1900 – November 16, 1985) was a lawyer, state legislator, and judge in Illinois.

== Early life ==
Harewood was born on June 25, 1900, in Saint Lucia in what was then the British West Indies. After the death of his parents, he moved to Chicago to live with his uncle. He attended Wendell Phillips High School and then enlisted in the United States Army. He received an honorable discharge on November 21, 1918. He received a bachelor of arts in liberal arts from the University of Illinois Urbana-Champaign in 1922. He was a professor of modern language at Talladega College for a time before returning to Chicago to earn his Juris Doctor degree from the University of Chicago Law School. He graduated law school in 1926. He then served as an assistant state's attorney for Cook County and an assistant corporation counsel for the City of Chicago.

== Political career ==
He was elected to the Illinois House of Representatives as one of three members from the 3rd district to the 60th General Assembly. He was an unsuccessful candidate for renomination for his seat in the 1938 Republican primary. In 1946, he was elected Democratic Central Committeeman from Illinois's 1st congressional district. During the 1956 general election, incumbent Robert Romano died and Harewood was selected to fill the vacancy on the ballot. He was elected in that year's general election. He served in the 70th General Assembly. In 1958, Harewood became the first African-American slated for statewide office in Illinois when the Cook County Democratic Party slated him to run for the then-elected position of trustee of the University of Illinois. He was elected to that office in the 1958 general election becoming the first African-American to hold statewide office in Illinois. He was later as a Cook County Circuit Judge. He died on November 16, 1985.

== See also ==
- List of African-American officeholders (1900–1959)
