= William H. Towers =

American lawyer and state legislator

William Henry Towers (died July 12, 1959) was a lawyer and state legislator from Kansas.

He was born in Kansas City and graduated from the University of Kansas Law School. He served as first assistant city attorney in Kansas City. He litigated against discriminatory housing covenants and union membership. He represented Wyandotte County for six two-year terms in the Kansas House of Representatives from 1937 to 1947. He was the only African American serving in Kansas' legislature at the time. He was a Republican.

== See also ==
- List of African-American officeholders (1900–1959)
