= Charles Griffin (baseball) =

American baseball player

- Pitcher

Negro league baseball debut
- 1887, for the Pittsburgh Keystones

Last appearance
- 1887, for the Pittsburgh Keystones

Teams
- Pittsburgh Keystones (1887)

Charles Griffin was an American Negro league pitcher in the 1880s.

Griffin played for the Pittsburgh Keystones in 1887. In five recorded appearances on the mound, he posted a 1.01 ERA over 35.2 innings.
