= Earl B. Dickerson =

American politician (1891–1986)

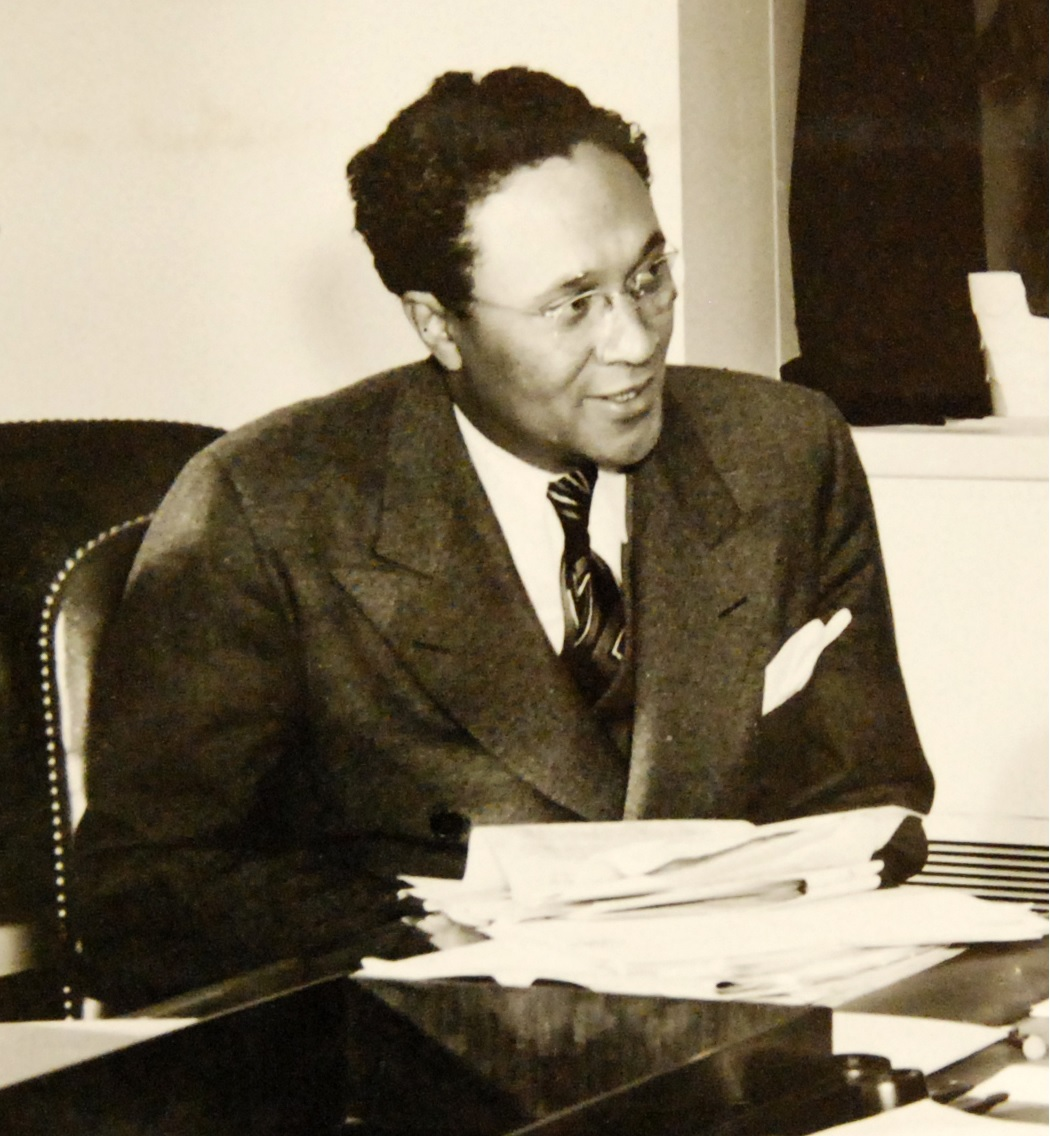
- Dickerson while a member of the President's Fair Employment Practice Committee

Member of Chicago City Council from the 2nd ward
- In office 1939–1943
- Preceded by: William L. Dawson
- Succeeded by: William H. Harvey

Personal details
- Born: Earl Burrus Dickerson; June 22, 1891 Canton, Mississippi, U.S.
- Died: September 1, 1986 (aged 95) Chicago, Illinois, U.S.
- Party: Democratic
- Education: University of Illinois at Urbana–Champaign
- Occupation: Attorney, businessman

Earl Burrus Dickerson (June 22, 1891 – September 1, 1986) was an American attorney, activist, military officer and businessman who successfully argued before the United States Supreme Court in Hansberry v. Lee, and was a member of the Chicago City Council and acting chairman of the federal Fair Employment Practice Committee.

== Early life ==
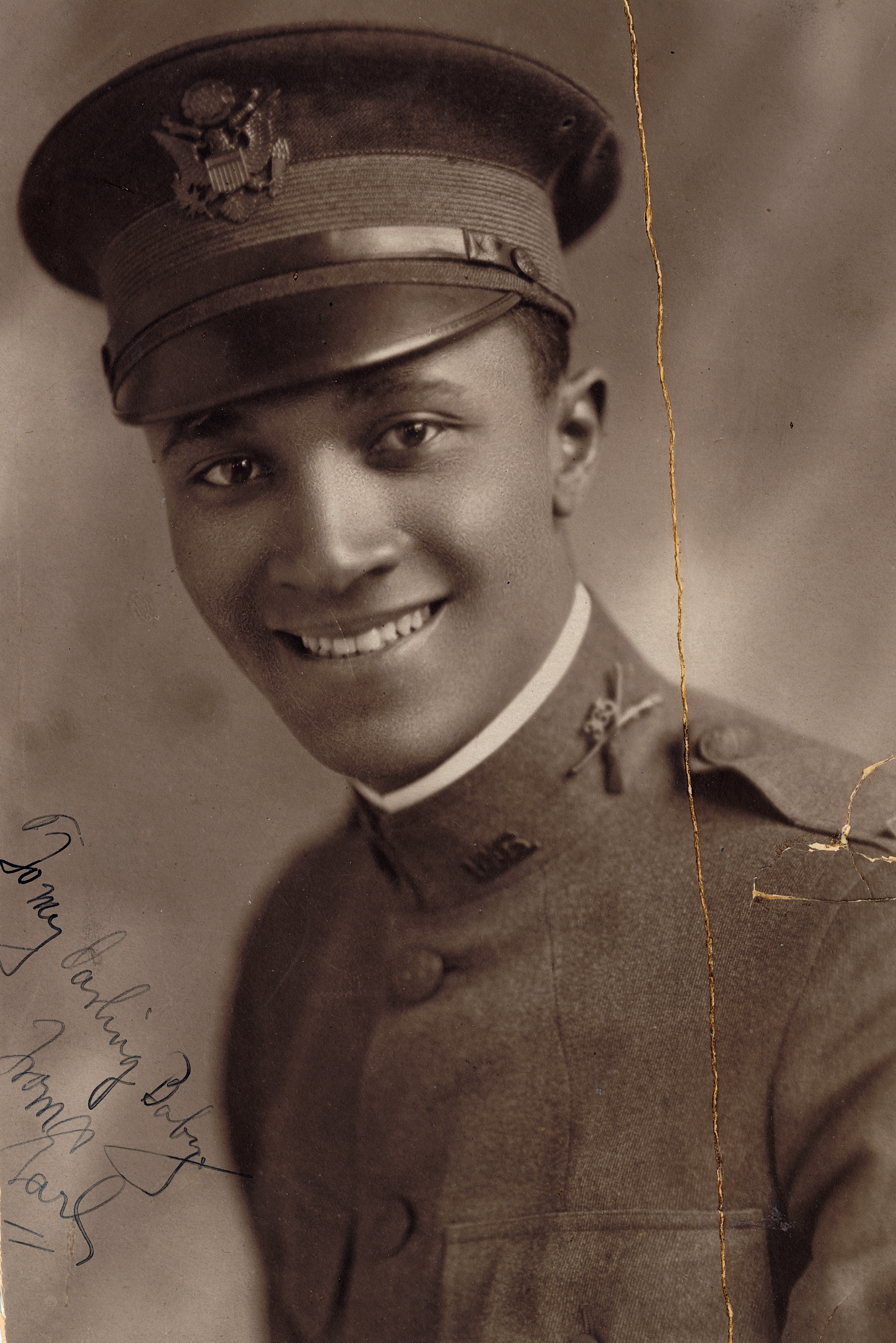
Dickerson in his U.S. Army uniform c. 1917–1918

Earl Burrus Dickerson was born on June 22, 1891, in Canton, Mississippi, United States, the son of Edward and Emma Garrett Fielding Dickerson. His maternal grandfather, Benjamin Franklin Garrett Sr., was born into slavery and purchased the freedom of himself and his wife, Eliza Montgomery prior to the end of the American Civil War in 1865. Earl's father died in 1896 and Earl was raised by his mother, his maternal grandmother, Eliza, and a half-sister from his father's first marriage, Gertrude.

Dickerson first moved to Chicago in 1907 and spent most of the next 10 years there, graduating from a University of Chicago-sponsored prep school in 1909. He earned a bachelor of arts degree from the University of Illinois in 1914. During his time spent studying at the University of Illinois, he helped establish the Beta chapter of Kappa Alpha Psi fraternity and served as the chapter's first president. Following the completion of his college credits, but prior to receiving his degree, Dickerson taught English, debate, and mathematics at the Tuskegee Institute for the 1913–14 school year.

In the fall of 1915, Dickerson began attending the University of Chicago Law School. At the end of his second year of law school, his legal studies were interrupted by World War I. Dickerson was commissioned into the United States Army and attended the Fort Des Moines Provisional Army Officer Training School. He was commissioned as a second lieutenant in 1917. Dickerson was stationed at Camp Grant in Illinois and assigned to Company E of the 365th Infantry Regiment's 2nd Battalion, which formed part of 92nd Infantry Division. He served in France as a member of the American Expeditionary Forces.

After the conclusion of the war in 1918, Dickerson became the only black founding member of the American Legion and personally organized the George L. Giles Post 87 in Chicago. Returning to the University of Chicago, Dickerson completed his legal studies in 1920, becoming one of the first African Americans to graduate from the Law School. The University of Chicago Black Law Students Association is named in his honor.

== Law career ==
In 1921, Dickerson accepted a position as general counsel of the newly formed Liberty Life Insurance Company of Illinois (later Supreme Liberty Life Insurance Company), which later became the largest African-American-owned insurance company in the North. This was not Dickerson's first association with the company. In 1919, while still a law student, he had helped draft the company's articles of incorporation. He considered his work with Supreme Liberty Life Insurance to be his most outstanding contribution to American society. While working for Supreme Liberty Life Insurance, Dickerson opened a law office and shared office space with fellow University of Chicago Law graduate Wendell E. Green, who later became a Circuit Court judge.

In 1923, Dickerson joined a partnership with Edward H. Morris and James B. Cashin to form Morris, Cashin, and Dickerson. Concurrent with this partnership, Dickerson served as an assistant corporation counsel for the city of Chicago. In 1927, he was instrumental in establishing Burr Oak Cemetery, one of the few African-American cemeteries in southwestern Cook County. Later, during the Great Depression, Dickerson helped persuade Supreme Liberty Life Insurance to step in and save the cemetery after Burr Oak defaulted on its mortgage.

Dickerson was known as "the dean of Chicago’s Black lawyers", and in 1933 became the first African American appointed as Illinois Assistant Attorney General under Governor Henry Horner. Dickerson served in that role until 1939.

Famously, Dickerson successfully argued before the U. S. Supreme Court in the landmark Hansberry v. Lee case. Hansberry involved a Chicago home purchased by real estate broker Carl Augustus Hansberry in a neighborhood with a racially restrictive covenant. Racially restrictive covenants were used to restrict black residents from living in certain neighborhoods (in turn creating a Black Belt of crowded, dilapidated, and under-resourced neighborhoods for black residents). Hansberry purchased a house in Woodlawn, which was under a racially restrictive covenant, with money borrowed from the Supreme Liberty Life Insurance Company. Hansberry served on the board of the Chicago NAACP with Dickerson and was the father of playwright Lorraine Hansberry. The events giving rise to Hansberry v. Lee inspired Lorraine Hansberry's play A Raisin in the Sun. Dickerson determined that there was a better chance to win the case based on a procedural issue surrounding class suits rather than argue the constitutionality of racially restrictive covenants. The decision in Hansberry v. Lee ended a racially restrictive covenant on the South Side of Chicago and paved the way for the Supreme Court to declare to racially restrictive covenants unconstitutional in Shelley v. Kraemer and Sipes v. McGhee in 1948.

Dickerson joined the Cook County Bar Association in 1920 and was elected as its president in 1938 and 1939. Dickerson led the movement to integrate the Chicago Bar Association and became a member in 1945. In 1945, Dickerson was elected President of the National Bar Association, an organization that included most of the approximately 1,500 black lawyers then practicing in the United States. Dickerson was the president of the National Lawyers Guild from 1951 to 1954, which countered the political positions and racial restrictions of the American Bar Association.

Dickerson was a prominent and dedicated activist for civil rights. Dickerson joined the NAACP in 1920 and the Chicago Urban League in 1921. In 1926, Dickerson was appointed the chair of the Legal Redress Committee in the NAACP. From 1941 to 1971, he served as a national board member of the NAACP. He was also elected to be the president of the Chicago Urban League in 1939 and served until 1955 (with the exception of 1948–49).

Dickerson was an involved member of his fraternity, Kappa Alpha Psi. In addition to serving as the first president of the Beta chapter at the University of Illinois, he helped organize the first alumni chapter of the organization. In 1924, Dickerson was awarded Kappa Alpha Psi's highest award, the Laurel Wreath. He served as the grand polemarch, or president, of Kappa Alpha Psi from 1924 to 1926. When James B. Parsons, the first African-American district judge in a U.S. district court, applied for a faculty membership in Kappa Alpha Psi, Dickerson attended his induction as a national officer of Kappa Alpha Psi.

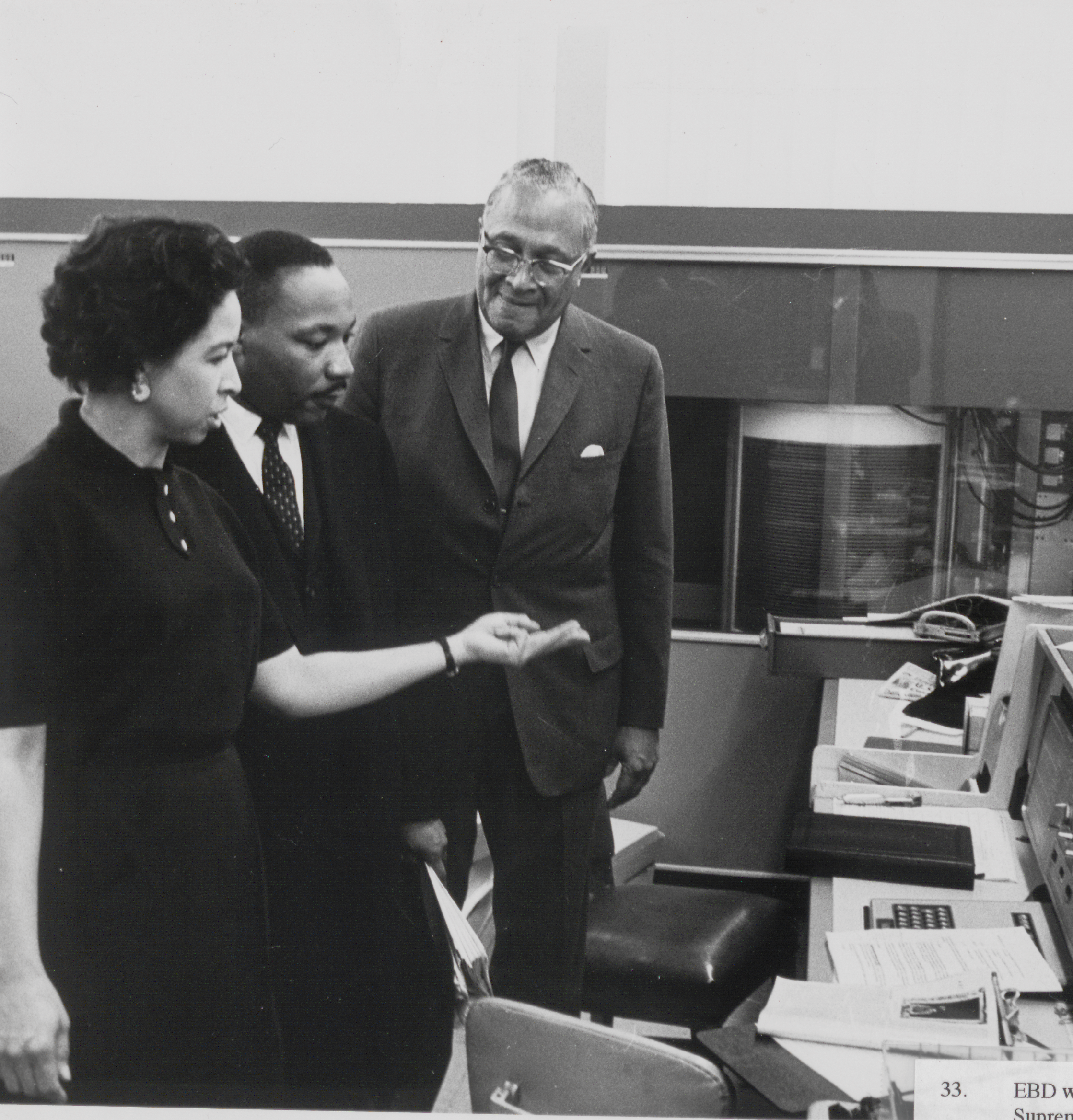
Dr. Martin Luther King Jr. tours the offices of the Supreme Liberty Life Insurance Company with Dickerson (date unknown). Clifford Burress, Photographer, Chicago, Illinois

In addition to his various other career achievements, Dickerson was elected president and chief executive officer of Supreme Liberty Life Insurance in 1955 and held this position until 1971.

== Political career ==
In 1924, Dickerson was nominated for Congress in Illinois's majority-black 1st district by Democratic Party boss George E. Brennan, replacing previous nominee James F. Doyle, who withdrew because of poor health. According to contemporary reporting, he was the first African American ever nominated for Congress by the Democratic Party. He was later forced to withdraw after Doyle demanded the nomination back.

Dickerson formed the South Side Legislative Commission in 1938, which created and advocated for pieces of legislation to the Illinois General Assembly.

In 1939, Dickerson was elected to be the first black Democratic alderman of Chicago's Second Ward. During his tenure as an alderman, Dickerson worked to address poor housing conditions for black Americans and the existence of racially restrictive covenants. Dickerson launched the Second Ward Community Fund, which helped low-income individuals afford food and clothing.

While initially discounting a Congressional run, Dickerson unsuccessfully primaried William L. Dawson for the 1942 Democratic nomination for the First Congressional District. He later ran for Congress in 1948 on the Progressive Party ticket, but was again unsuccessful.

Dickerson was appointed as a member of President Franklin D. Roosevelt’s first Fair Employment Practices Committee (FEPC) and served as its acting chairman. Through his work with the FEPC, Dickerson sought to increase the conditions and employment rate for black Americans.

In 1963, Dickerson participated in the March on Washington for Jobs and Freedom and stood on stage near Martin Luther King Jr. during the “I Have a Dream” speech. That same year, Dickerson led the Chicago Exposition of the Centennial of the Emancipation Proclamation.

Dickerson was one of the first recipients of the Thurgood Marshall Award, given by the NAACP Legal Defense Fund, for supporting civil rights laws. In 1971, Dickerson was named “Black Businessman of the Year.” Due to his service to the City of Chicago, Mayor Harold Washington declared May 1, 1983 to be “Earl B. Dickerson” day.

== Personal life ==
Dickerson married Inez Moss in 1912. Their marriage ended in divorce in 1927.

On June 15, 1930, Dickerson married Kathryn Kennedy Wilson. Kathryn had one son, Rodger Wilson Jr., from a previous marriage. Together, Dickerson and Kennedy had one daughter, Diane, who was born in 1934.

Dickerson died in his Chicago home on September 1, 1986, and was buried next to his wife Kathryn in Burr Oak, the cemetery he helped found.
