= Henry T. Eubanks =

American politician

Henry T. Eubanks (c. 1853 - 1913) was a waiter and barber proprietor who served as a state legislator in Cleveland, Ohio. He served in the Ohio House of Representatives. He was a Republican and served two non-consecutive terms from 1904 to 1905 and 1909 to 1910. Eubanks was African-American.

Eubanks was born in Stanford, Kentucky. He promoted anti-lynching legislation.

He worked as a waiter in Louisville, Kentucky. He had a barbershop in Cleveland. He declined to speak at one meeting to avoid an argument.

== See also ==
- African American officeholders from the end of the Civil War until before 1900
