= James S. Hunter =

American politician

James S. Hunter (1900 – 1965) was an American politician, who served as a state legislator in Indiana from 1941 until his death in 1965. He was born in Kentucky. A Democrat, he represented Lake County, Indiana in the Indiana House of Representatives.
