= Walter K. Jackson =

American politician

Walter K. Jackson was an American politician.

He served in the Pennsylvania House of Representatives from 1935 to 1938.

The website of the Pennsylvania General Assembly names him Walker Killingsworth Jackson, and states that he did not run for office after the 1936 session ended. He contested the 1947 Philadelphia City Council elections, and was not elected.

== See also ==
- List of African-American officeholders (1900–1959)
