= Charles J. Jenkins (Illinois politician) =

American lawyer and politician

Member of the Illinois House of Representatives
- In office 1931 – December 8, 1954

Personal details
- Born: October 4, 1897 Austin, Texas, U.S.
- Died: December 8, 1954 (aged 57) Chicago, U.S.
- Party: Republican
- Education: Bishop College

Charles J. Jenkins (October 4, 1897 – December 8, 1954) was an American lawyer and politician.

== Biography ==
Jenkins was born in Austin, Texas, and was an African American. In 1904, after the death of his father, he moved to Chicago, Illinois, and graduated from Wendell Phillips Academy High School. He received his bachelor's degree from Bishop College in 1919 and his law degree from Chicago-Kent College of Law in 1922. Jenkins was admitted to the Illinois bar in 1922 and practiced law in Chicago. He served in the Illinois House of Representatives from 1931 until his death in 1954. He was chairman of the house appropriations committee, the first person of color to become chairman of a major committee in Illinois. He died at Presbyterian Hospital in Chicago, from an illness.
