= Benjamin H. Lucas =

American minister and politician

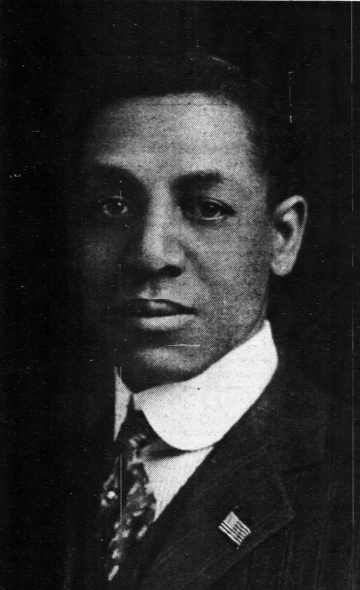
- Circa 1918

Member of the Illinois House of Representatives
- In office 1917–1919

Personal details
- Born: July 4, 1879 Brooklyn, Illinois
- Died: Unknown
- Party: Republican
- Spouse: Jessie Hudson (m. 1903; died 1951)

Benjamin H. Lucas (July 4, 1879 – ?) was an American minister and state legislator in Illinois. He represented District 1 in Cook County and served from 1917 from 1919.

== Biography ==
Lucas was born July 4, 1879 in Brooklyn, Illinois and was left without a father from ten years old. He was educated in public schools. He started work as a child selling newspapers and shining shoes, as an adult he worked as a boot-black, janitor, porter, shipping clerk, postal clerk, state weigher, clerk in the Foreign Corporation Department, fire marshal, deputy state fire marshal and in insurance. He took up teaching which he did not like, causing him to move to Chicago in July 1900 to study law.

Lucas was a member of the Bethel African Methodist Episcopal Church and taught Sunday School for fifteen years. He was involved with a number of organisations including the United Brothers of Friendship, the YMCA, NAACP, Urban League, Emanuel Lodge No. 31, the United Brothers of Friendship, Knights Templar and Ancient Order of Foresters.

In 1902 he was the elected secretary of the 2nd Ward Republican Club. He believed in equality for all men regardless of race. He married Jessie Hudson on December 23, 1903 in Chicago. She died November 8, 1951.

Lucas was elected into the 50th Illinois General Assembly in 1916, serving in the Illinois House of Representatives from 1917 to 1919. He stood for re-election in 1918 for the 51st assembly and in 1920. He ran for the Illinois State Senate in 1954 contending as a Republican for the 5th district against the incumbent Democrat Marshall Korshak, but lost.

Lucas was listed in the United States census as living in Illinois in the 1910, 1920, 1940 and 1950 but in the 1930 census his home was listed as Cedar Rapids, Iowa.

He was drafted to the military for both World War I in 1918 and World War II. From the 1930 census onwards he was listed as either a pastor or ministor.

== See also ==
- List of African-American officeholders (1900–1959)
