= Walter E. Tucker =

American politician

Walter E. Tucker was an American politician and a state legislator in Pennsylvania. After splitting votes with another African American candidate Theron B. Hamilton who ran as an independent (after being blocked from the Republican Party by mayor Charles Kline), Tucker and Hamilton lost the Republican Primary, but was able to win the election when one of the primary victors died soon after before the general election and Tucker received his party's endorsement. He was the first African American state representative from Pittsburgh.
