= Minnie Buckingham Harper =

American politician

Member of the West Virginia House of Delegates
- In office February 14, 1928 – January, 1929
- Preceded by: Ebenezer Howard Harper
- Succeeded by: Flemmie P. Stamp

Personal details
- Born: May 15, 1886 Winfield, West Virginia, U.S.
- Died: February 10, 1978 (aged 91)
- Party: Republican
- Spouse: Ebenezer Howard Harper

Minnie Buckingham Harper (May 15, 1886 – February 10, 1978) was an American politician and housewife.

Born in Winfield, West Virginia, Harper was a resident of Keystone when in 1928 she became the first Black woman legislator in the United States. She was appointed by Governor Howard M. Gore to the West Virginia House of Delegates to fill the vacancy left by the death of her husband, Ebenezer Howard Harper. The McDowell County Republican Executive Committee unanimously recommended that Harper fill her husband's position.

She did not seek re-election at the end of her term.
