= William Massingale =

American politician in Missouri

William Alexander Massingale (born May 19, 1897 - died Aug 13, 1988) was an American politician and state legislator in Missouri. He served in the Missouri House of Representatives from 1947 to 1948. He lived in St. Louis.

Massingale was elected to the new eleventh district of the Missouri House of Representatives as a Democrat in the 1946 election beating Republican Peter Ferrara.

In January 1948, he introduced a bill to make racial discrimination in public places a punishable offence.

Massingale and a driver were arrested for using a vehicle-mounted sound system to campaign in violation of a city ordinance. Massingale was described as a Republican who switched to the Democrats after being elected and then became a Progressive when running for re-election. After his unsuccessful campaign he was part of a delegation that lobbied mayor Aloys P. Kaufmann to support an anti-segregation bill.

Massingale was described as an elevator operator and accused of being a Communist in testimony.

== See also ==
- List of African-American officeholders (1900–1959)
