= Susie Monroe =

American politician in Pennsylvania

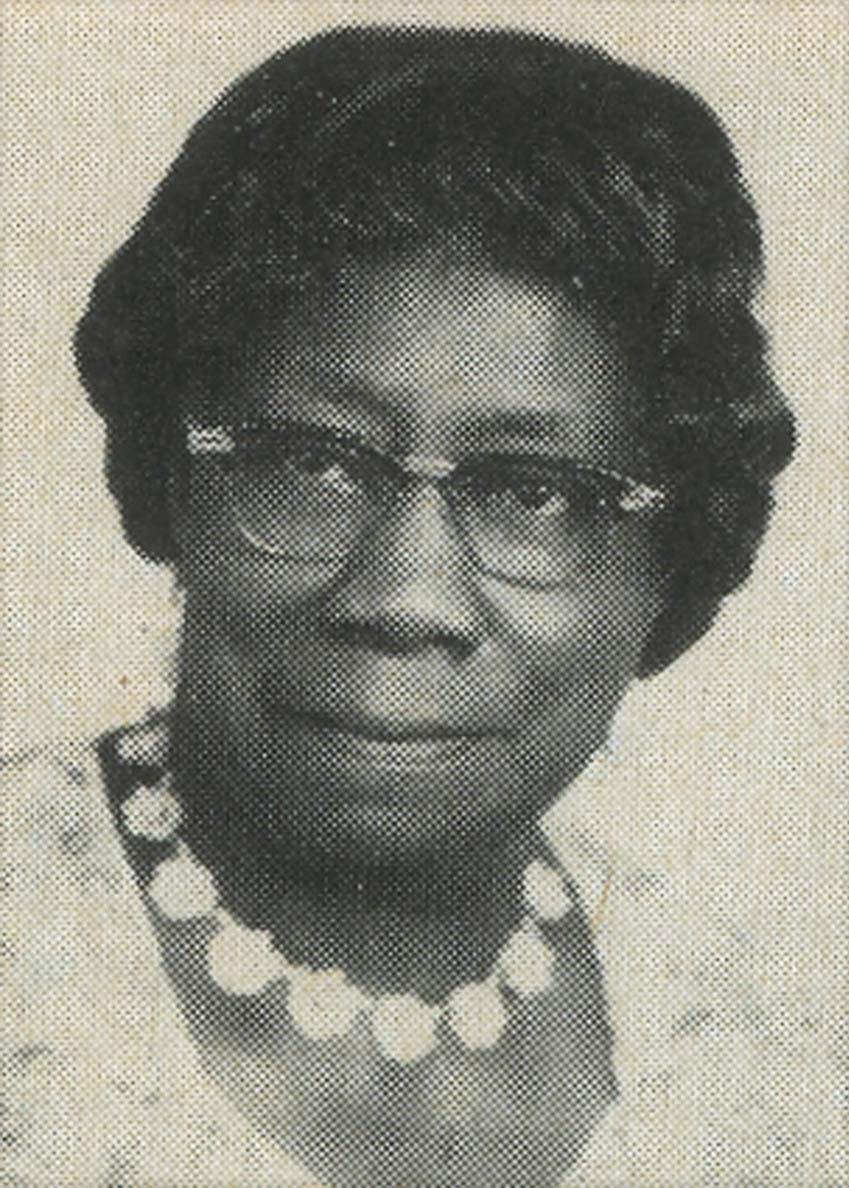
- The Honorable Susie Monroe, c. 1960s

Member of the Pennsylvania House of Representatives Philadelphia, Pennsylvania
- In office January 1949 – November 7, 1968 (her death)

Personal details
- Born: March 4, 1885 Jacksonville, Florida
- Died: November 7, 1968 (aged 83) Temple University Hospital, Philadelphia, Pennsylvania
- Party: Democratic

Susie Monroe (March 4, 1885 – November 7, 1968) was a teacher, dressmaker and beauty salon owner who was elected to the Pennsylvania House of Representatives in 1948.

A native of Jacksonville, Florida and Democrat who had relocated to Philadelphia, Pennsylvania during the 1930s, she represented her constituents for ten consecutive terms, from January 1949 until November 7, 1968.

== Formative years ==
Born in Jacksonville, Florida on March 4, 1885, Monroe graduated from St. Athanasius High School.

Sometime during the 1930s, she relocated from Florida to Pennsylvania. A resident of Philadelphia, she was employed as a dressmaker and beauty salon operator.

== Political and public service career ==
Chair of the Democratic Party's 32nd Ward Democratic Executive Committee, Monroe was elected to the Pennsylvania House of Representatives in 1948 and was sworn into office in 1949. Repeatedly reelected by large margins, she served for nine additional, consecutive terms and was still a sitting representative at the time of her death in 1968.

During her tenure in the Pennsylvania House, Monroe became known for her work on legislation designed to ensure fair and equal employment treatment for Pennsylvania workers, improvements in public healthcare, and improved access to safe, affordable housing.

=== 1940s ===
In March 1949, Monroe joined with two of her fellow House members, Rep. Marion L. Munley (Democrat, Lackawanna County) and Rep. Mary Varallo (Democrat, Philadelphia), to co-sponsor legislation to provide thirty additional dollars per month, per person, to aging Pennsylvanians who were eligible for retirement pensions. The proposed funds were slated to supplement existing financial assistance to senior citizens that was being provided by the federal government.

=== 1950s ===
In May 1951, she collaborated with Rep. Herman Toll and Rep. John Welsh to push for new legislation to prohibit "the working of women for more than six consecutive days without at least one day of rest."

In July 1953, she collaborated again with Varallo to push for passage of legislation to establish a three-member commission within Pennsylvania's Department of Labor and Industry "to initiate, receive, investigate and pass upon complaints charging unlawful employment practices" in order "to halt job discrimination because of race, creed or ancestry." Earlier that same year, she had worked with Varallo, Munley, Rep. Josephine C. Coyle (Democrat, Philadelphia), and Rep. Marian E. Markley (Republican, Lehigh County) to press their colleagues to appropriate $50,000 in funding to support the hiring and training of teachers for deaf and hard-of-hearing students in public schools across Pennsylvania.

In February 1955, Monroe and multiple colleagues pushed for an investigation by the Pennsylvania House of Representatives of the Pennsylvania Public Assistance Department in order to improve the processing of public assistance funding requests by elderly residents of the state and families with children. In May, Monroe collaborated with multiple colleagues to create legislation that would authorize Pennsylvania State University to launch an extension program in industrial and labor relations. During the summer and fall of that same year, Monroe continued to advocate for children and families by co-sponsoring legislation with Representatives Louis Sherman (Democrat, Philadelphia) and Jeanette Reibman (Democrat, Northampton) to improve educational programs and other forms of assistance for children with disabilities. Those latter advocacy efforts bore fruit in March 1956 when Pennsylvania Governor George M. Leader signed legislation that authorized the commonwealth to provide funding for school districts statewide to create and maintain facilities for the education of students with disabilities, including financial compensation for districts to address the differences in costs between the education of students with and without disabilities. The total amount of funding authorized by this legislative act was "$8.1 million a biennium."

In February 1957, Monroe and Varallo introduced House Bill 136 to "amend the Pennsylvania firearms law to require a permit or license for the carrying of any firearm." In April, they collaborated again, this time proposing legislation to create and fund a city college in Philadelphia. Later that same year, they both joined forces with Republican representatives Markley and Rep. Evelyn Glazier Henzel to co-sponsor the bipartisan Equal Pay Act (HB545) that was supported by the governor.

In 1959, Monroe served on the Pennsylvania House's Insurance Committee and its Law and Order Committee. She also collaborated with Representatives Herbert Arlene, Samuel Floyd and Herbert Holt to introduce House Bill 175 to legalize horse racing and tax gambling proceeds related to those races. In March, she and Holt joined Rep. Sarah Anderson in pushing for the passage of House Bill 322 to amend the Fair Employment Practices Act of 1955 in order to "prohibit discrimination in the selling, leasing or financing of commercial housing, and discrimination in places of public accommodation, resort or amusement because of race, color, religious creed, ancestry or national origin." The legislation received support from the NAACP. It was opposed by the Pennsylvania Association of Realtors and the York Real Estate Board.

=== 1960s ===
In 1964, Monroe was appointed to a joint state government commission to study the impact of tobacco use on teenagers. In January 1965, she was appointed to the Municipal Corporations Committee of the Pennsylvania House. In June of that year, she broke with the majority of her Democratic colleagues to vote against legislation to ban "the use of lie detector tests as a condition of employment," a corporate practice that had been steadily increasing until the Pennsylvania Legislature took action against it. Although Monroe joined with two of her other Democratic colleagues in opposing the proposed ban, the legislation passed the Pennsylvania House by a vote of 182 to 21.

On Monday, December 18, 1967, Bloomsburg, Pennsylvania's Morning Press reported that Monroe was contesting the results of a $65.6 million sales tax increase, which was the "centerpiece" of a $150 million tax package that had been approved by the Pennsylvania House on Friday evening, December 15, 1967 "by a 102-96 vote, the exact number needed to pass a bill." Although members of the House were claiming that Monroe had voted in favor of the tax increase, by absentee ballot because she had been ill, Monroe disputed those claims, saying, "Somebody has pulled a trick.... I am from a poor district and I never, under any circumstances, would have voted in favor of a sales tax." The Philadelphia Daily News then reported that "Milton J. Shapp, unsuccessful candidate for Governor last year" planned to file a lawsuit to block the tax increase, adding that "Someone apparently pulled the lever on [Monroe's] desk to register the clinching vote" while Monroe was at home, recovering from an undisclosed illness.

The controversy set off a debate about "House Rule X," a procedure that had allowed the recording of "phantom votes" that were purportedly made by members of the Pennsylvania House when they were absent from the floor as part of a "gentleman's agreement between House Republicans and Democrats to let both sides cast votes for their absent members."

"It's fairly easy to do. When a vote is called, a neighbor of the absent representative simply flips a toggle switch on the absentee's desk—to the right for a nay vote and to the left for a yea.

As House Minority Leader Herbert Fineman (D., Phila.) explained, 'It's almost historic and traditional—although admittedly against the rules—that members will cast votes for other members on their request. It occurs quite frequently."

Fineman said the phantom ballots are challenged quite frequently on highly controversial issues but said the Democrats were not aware of Mrs. Monroe's absence until they read her complaints in the newspapers."

Fineman subsequently pledged that "he and all Democrats will support Miss Monroe if she pursues the challenge," which contradicted statements made by other members of the House.

On Tuesday, December 19, 1967, the day after Monroe announced her intention to challenge the disputed vote, Pennsylvania Lieutenant Governor Raymond J. Broderick, a Republican, ruled against a "proposed requirement that state legislators be physically present in their seats to vote on tax bills" that had been introduced at Pennsylvania's Constitutional Convention by Representative Henry P. Otto (Republican, Allentown) in response to the voting controversy. When introducing the proposed change, Otto stated that "It is becoming apparent that the state House of Representatives is adopting a dangerous procedure in passing controversial and taxing proposals." Broderick ruled that Otto's proposal was "beyond the scope of the limited convention." Three days later, Shapp reiterated his intention to initiate a laswuit on behalf of Pennsylvania taxpayers if Pennsylvania Governor Raymond P. Shafer signed the six-percent tax increase into law, stating that the legislation was "ill conceived and illegally achieved."

=== Legacy ===
In addition to her legacy of an improved quality of life for children and adults across Pennsylvania, due to the debates about legislation that she helped to introduce, shape and pass, Monroe's refusal to back down and be silenced about the alleged usurpation of her vote on a major sales tax increase in 1967 resulted in changes to the way that members of the Pennsylvania House of Representatives conducted business. In early 1968, House leaders began the new legislative year by initiating a master roll call at the start of each day's session "to pinpoint the absentees and make sure they are not voted." In addition, the leadership required that any members arriving late to a day's session announce their presence "in order to be allowed to vote."

Although Shapp did file a taxpayer lawsuit on January 17, 1968 to contest the legality of the six-percent tax increase that had passed as a result of the controversial House vote, a lawsuit that he and his attorneys continued to litigate for more than a year, Shapp's suit was ultimately dismissed by a seven judge-panel of the Commonwealth Court in February 1969 that declined, via a thirty-five page opinion written by Judge Homer L. Kreider, "to trespass on what it called legislative authority."

== Death and interment ==
Monroe died at Temple University Hospital in Philadelphia on November 7, 1968. Following funeral services at St. Augustine's Protestant Episcopal Church on November 12, she was buried at the Rolling Green Memorial Park in West Chester, Pennsylvania.
