= Aubrey H. Smith =

American politician (died 1979)

Aubrey H. Smith (died December 25, 1979) was a dentist and state legislator in Illinois.

He graduated from Fisk University before going to Northwestern University dental school.

Smith moved to East St. Louis, Illinois in 1926 where he lived for 50 years and worked as a dentist until he moved to Arkansas a few months before his death.

He was the first Democrat to be elected to serve in the Illinois General Assembly from East St. Louis. He beat incumbent Frank Holten who had served for 18 years. He served just a single term from 1935-1937. He did not run for a second term because he rejected the idea of accepting campaign contributions and being a professional politician.

He died December 25, 1979 aged 79 at his home in Pine Bluff, Arkansas. His first wife Aldena Windham Davis Smith died previously but he was survived by his second wife A. H. Smith.
