= Dudley S. Martin =

American politician (1903–1979)

Dudley S. Martin (November 18, 1903 – June 18, 1979) was a state legislator from Illinois. Martin was born in Forest Hills, Tennessee and graduated from LeMoyne College. A Republican, he was elected from the 3rd District in Chicago to the Illinois House of Representatives in 1940.

Dudley died June 18, 1979, in Dyersburg, Tennessee.
