= Charles A. Griffin =

American politician

Member of the Illinois House of Representatives from the 1st district
- In office 1925–1929

Personal details
- Born: January 24, 1884 Bellaire, Ohio, U.S.
- Party: Republican
- Children: 2
- Parent(s): James M. Griffin; Sarah S. Griffin
- Profession: Politician

Charles A. Griffin (January 24, 1884 – ?) was a state legislator in Illinois. He was born in Bellaire, Ohio and moved to Chicago after high school. He served in the Illinois House of Representatives from 1925 to 1929. A Republican, he advocated for civil rights, helped establish a community center and YMCA and was involved in fraternal organizations.

He married and had two children.

== See also ==
- List of African-American officeholders (1900–1959)
