= Anthony Wilson (American politician) =

American politician

Member of the Georgia House of Representatives from the Camden County district

Personal details
- Born: Georgia, U.S.
- Party: Republican
- Occupation: School teacher
- Profession: Politician

Anthony Wilson was a school teacher and American politician. He served in the Georgia House of Representatives. He represented Camden County, Georgia.

== Early life ==
Anthony Wilson was born in Georgia. His brother was Hercules Wilson. After the Reconstruction Acts were passed, Wilson was one of the first African-Americans to register to vote in the American South, registering in 1867.

== Career ==
Wilson worked as a school teacher in Camden County, Georgia. He ran for election to the Georgia House of Representatives and won. While serving in the House, Wilson lived with his brother Hercules and a fellow legislator with the last name of Fraiser.

Hercules did not run for re-election, but Anthony Wilson continued to serve in the house. In 1885, Wilson introduced a bill to ban racial discrimination at hotels, theaters and circuses. The bill failed to pass receiving only three votes, all from African-American legislators.

By 1888, he was only one of two African-Americans serving in the Georgia House, the other being S. A. McIvor. His last term was the 1892–93 session.
