= Chester Gillespie =

Ohio lawyer and politician (1897–1985)

Chester K. Gillespie (1897–1985) was a lawyer and politician who worked for civil rights in Cleveland, Ohio.

== Biography ==
Gillespie was born in Home City, Ohio to Warren and Lulu Trail Gillespie. He graduated from Ohio State University and then from Baldwin-Wallace College Law School in 1920. He served three terms in the Ohio General Assembly in 1933–34, 1939–40, and 1943–44. He was a Republican.

He served in the U.S. Army during World War II. He and fellow attorney Clayborne George were denied office space in buildings in downtown Cleveland because they were African American.

Gillespie served as president of the Cleveland Branch of the National Association for the Advancement of Colored People (NAACP) in 1936 and 1937.
