= William L. Dawson (politician) =

American politician (1886–1970)

William Dawson
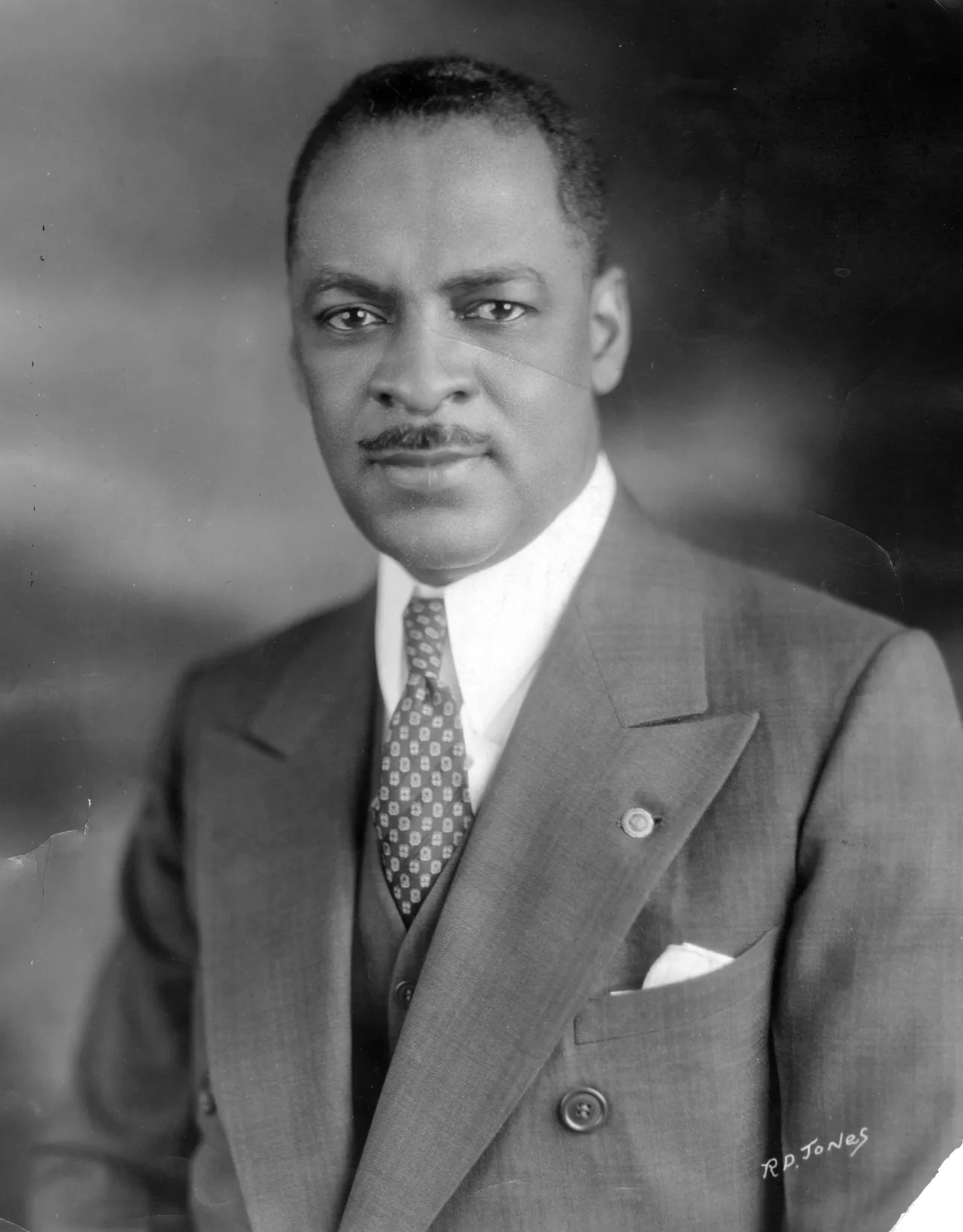
- Dawson in 1933

Member of the U.S. House of Representatives from Illinois's 1st district
- In office January 3, 1943 – November 9, 1970
- Preceded by: Arthur Mitchell
- Succeeded by: Ralph Metcalfe

Member of the Chicago City Council from the 2nd ward
- In office 1933 – April 12, 1939
- Preceded by: Louis B. Anderson
- Succeeded by: Earl B. Dickerson

Personal details
- Born: William Levi Dawson; April 26, 1886 Albany, Georgia, U.S.
- Died: November 9, 1970 (aged 84) Chicago, Illinois, U.S.
- Party: Republican (before 1939); Democratic (1939–1970)
- Spouse: Nelle Brown
- Children: 2
- Education: Albany State University (attended); Fisk University (BA); Northwestern University (LLB)

Military service
- Allegiance: United States
- Branch/service: United States Army
- Years of service: 1917–1919
- Rank: First Lieutenant
- Unit: 366th Infantry Regiment
- Battles/wars: World War I

William Levi Dawson (April 26, 1886 – November 9, 1970) was an American politician and lawyer who represented a Chicago, Illinois district for more than 27 years in the United States House of Representatives, serving from 1943 to his death in office in 1970. In 1949, he became the first African American to chair a congressional committee.

Born in segregated Georgia, Dawson attended Fisk University in Tennessee and Northwestern University School of Law in Chicago. He served as an officer in the segregated U.S. Army in World War I. Back in Chicago, he became a successful lawyer, community leader, and Democratic Party activist.

Like his two predecessors representing Illinois' 1st District, when Dawson was first elected in 1942, he was the only African American in Congress. He was active in the civil rights movement and sponsored registration drives. In the late 1940s he successfully opposed efforts to re-segregate the military.

Dawson was the first African American to chair a standing committee in the United States Congress, when he chaired the Committee on Expenditures in the Executive Departments. He served as chair of that committee and its successor for most of the years between 1949 and 1970. After 1952, Dawson also became closely aligned with the political machine in Chicago, collaborating often with Mayor Richard J. Daley. In this role, he focused on patronage and services for his constituents. He gave no support to the efforts of Martin Luther King Jr. to shake up city politics in the late 1960s.

== Early life and education ==
Dawson was born in Albany, Georgia in 1886. He attended the local public segregated school and graduated from Albany Normal School in 1905, which prepared teachers for lower schools. He continued his studies at Fisk University, a historically black college in Nashville, Tennessee, where he graduated magna cum laude in 1909.

He moved to the Chicago area in Illinois in 1912 to study at Northwestern University Law School. He was initiated into Theta chapter of Alpha Phi Alpha fraternity. He reached Chicago at the beginning of the Great Migration of hundreds of thousands of African Americans from rural areas of the South to industrial cities in the North and Midwest - more than 1.5 million migrated up to 1940, and millions more after that.

== Career ==
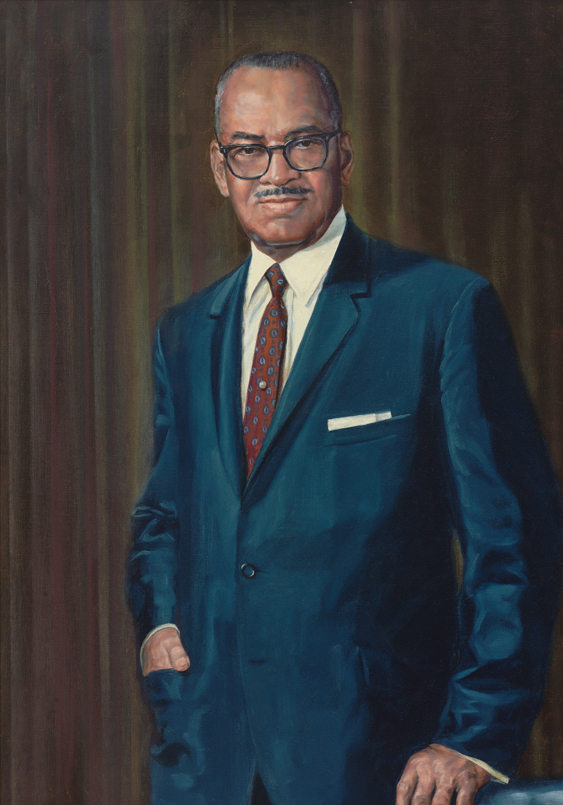
Dawson's official Congressional portrait

With the entry of the U.S. into World War I, Dawson served in France as a first lieutenant with the 366th Infantry Regiment of the United States Army from 1917 until 1919. After returning home, he was admitted to the bar in 1920 and started a private practice in Chicago.

Dawson entered politics, becoming a member of the Republican Party in 1930 as a state central committeeman for the First Congressional District of Illinois. He held this position until 1932. That year, he was elected as an alderman for the second ward of Chicago, serving from 1933 until 1939. After that, he served as a Democratic Party committeeman.

Dawson was elected in 1942 as a Democratic Representative from Illinois to the Seventy-eighth, and to the thirteen succeeding Congresses, serving from January 3, 1943, until his death from pneumonia in Chicago, Illinois in 1970. In addition to influencing national policy, he acted as a mentor for rising young black politicians in Chicago, such as Archibald Carey Jr., helping with their elections and federal appointments.

During his tenure in the House, Dawson was a vocal opponent of the poll tax, which in practice was discriminatory against poorer voters. Since the end of the nineteenth century, poll taxes were among a variety of measures passed by Southern states to disfranchise most black voters and tens of thousands of poor whites as well, particularly in Alabama through the 1940s.

Dawson is credited with defeating the Winstead Amendment. Proposed by Representative William Winstead (D-Mississippi) after the Truman administration integrated the United States armed forces following World War II, it would have allowed military members to opt out of racially integrated units.

In 1952, Dawson was the featured speaker at the first annual conference of the Regional Council of Negro Leadership (a civil rights organization), held in the all-black town of Mound Bayou, Mississippi. He was invited by Dr. T.R.M. Howard, who headed the RCNL. Dawson was the first black congressman to speak in the state since Reconstruction ended in 1877.

Dawson, a member of the Democratic National Committee (DNC), had the long-term goal of increasing national black support for the party. Since the Civil War, most blacks had been allied with the Republican Party, as it had emancipated the slaves and led the movement for amendments to grant them citizenship and the franchise. T.R.M. Howard, who had moved to Chicago, challenged Dawson as a Republican opponent in the 1958 election, but Dawson won and kept his seat.

In 1949, Dawson became the first African American to serve as the chairman of a regular congressional committee, and he led the Committee on Expenditures in the Executive Departments in the Eighty-first and Eighty-second Congresses. He chaired its successor, the Committee on Government Operations, in the Eighty-fourth through Ninety-first Congresses. For years, he and Adam Clayton Powell Jr. from Harlem, New York, were the only two African-American representatives in Congress.

Dawson was also leader of the African-American "submachine" within the Cook County Democratic Organization. In the predominantly African-American wards, Dawson acted as his own political boss, handing out patronage and punishing rivals just as leaders of the larger machine did, such as Richard J. Daley. Dawson played an integral role in Daley's rise to the mayoralty in 1955, when Daley defeated incumbent mayor Martin Kennelly in the Democratic primary. However, Dawson's machine continually had to support the regular machine in order to retain its own clout. He chose to work on city politics from this stance, rather than to conduct open civil-rights challenges, and he did not support the work of Dr. Martin Luther King Jr. in Chicago in the 1960s. Dawson undercut the nascent efforts of the Chicago Housing Authority in the early 1950s to integrate black residents into white neighborhoods because those neighborhoods were outside Dawson's district and, hence, not votes that he could deliver to the machine.

Dawson advised 1960 presidential candidate John F. Kennedy not to "use the phrase 'civil rights' in his speeches because it might hurt the feelings of Dawson's Southern friends in Congress -- friends who had given Dawson control over many jobs in federal agencies." President Kennedy offered Dawson the position of United States Postmaster General as a reward for his work on Kennedy's 1960 election campaign. Dawson declined, as he believed that he could accomplish more in the House.

Dawson died of pneumonia in Chicago on November 9, 1970. He was cremated, and his ashes were placed in the columbarium in the Griffin Funeral Home in Chicago.

== Electoral history ==
Illinois's 1st congressional district Republican primary, 1928
Party	Candidate	Votes	%
Republican	Martin B. Madden (incumbent)	22,427	68.15
Republican	William L. Dawson	9,424	28.64
Republican	George J. Witt	541	1.64
Republican	Chandler Owen	315	0.96
Republican	T. W. Shavers	200	0.61
Total votes		32,907	100.0

Illinois's 1st congressional district Republican primary, 1938
Party	Candidate	Votes	%
Republican	William L. Dawson	4,577	30.65
Republican	Louis B. Anderson	4,340	29.07
Republican	Oscar DePriest	4,059	27.18
Republican	Roscoe Conkling Simmons	1,703	11.41
Republican	Benjamin W. Clayton	253	1.69
Total votes		14,932	100.0

Illinois's 1st congressional district general election, 1938
Party	Candidate	Votes	%
Democratic	Arthur W. Mitchell (incumbent)	30,207	53.37
Republican	William L. Dawson	26,396	46.63
Total votes		56,603	100.0

Illinois's 1st congressional district Democratic primary, 1942
Party	Candidate	Votes	%
Democratic	William L. Dawson	14,628	69.89
Democratic	Earl B. Dickerson	4,521	21.60
Democratic	William S. McNamara	1,782	8.51
Total votes		20,931	100.0

Illinois's 1st congressional district general election, 1942
Party	Candidate	Votes	%
Democratic	William L. Dawson	26,280	52.75
Republican	William E. King	23,537	47.25
Total votes		49,817	100.0

Illinois's 1st congressional district Democratic primary, 1944
Party	Candidate	Votes	%
Democratic	William L. Dawson (incumbent)	13,428	100.0
Total votes		13,428	100.0

Illinois's 1st congressional district general election, 1944
Party	Candidate	Votes	%
Democratic	William L. Dawson (incumbent)	42,713	61.98
Republican	William E. King	26,204	38.02
Total votes		68,917	100.0

Illinois's 1st congressional district Democratic primary, 1946
Party	Candidate	Votes	%
Democratic	William L. Dawson (incumbent)	19,539	100.0
Total votes		19,539	100.0

Illinois's 1st congressional district general election, 1946
Party	Candidate	Votes	%
Democratic	William L. Dawson (incumbent)	38,040	56.79
Republican	William E. King	28,945	43.21
Total votes		66,985	100.0

Illinois's 1st congressional district Democratic primary, 1948
Party	Candidate	Votes	%
Democratic	William L. Dawson (incumbent)	29,963	90.28
Democratic	Richard A. Harewood	3,225	9.72
Total votes		33,188	100.0

Illinois's 1st congressional district general election, 1948
Party	Candidate	Votes	%
Democratic	William L. Dawson (incumbent)	98,690	66.96
Republican	William E. King	43,034	29.20
Progressive	Earl B. Dickerson	5,669	3.85
Total votes		147,393	100.0

Illinois's 1st congressional district Democratic primary, 1950
Party	Candidate	Votes	%
Democratic	William L. Dawson (incumbent)	38,026	100.0
Total votes		38,026	100.0

Illinois's 1st congressional district general election, 1950
Party	Candidate	Votes	%
Democratic	William L. Dawson (incumbent)	69,506	61.74
Republican	Archibald James Carey, Jr.	41,944	37.26
Progressive	Samuel J. Parks	1,135	1.01
Total votes		112,585	100.0

Illinois's 1st congressional district Democratic primary, 1952
Party	Candidate	Votes	%
Democratic	William L. Dawson (incumbent)	34,573	100.0
Total votes		34,573	100.0

Illinois's 1st congressional district general election, 1952
Party	Candidate	Votes	%
Democratic	William L. Dawson (incumbent)	95,899	73.50
Republican	Edgar G. Brown	34,571	26.50
Total votes		130,470	100.0

Illinois's 1st congressional district Democratic primary, 1954
Party	Candidate	Votes	%
Democratic	William L. Dawson (incumbent)	29,879	100.0
Total votes		29,879	100.0

Illinois's 1st congressional district general election, 1954
Party	Candidate	Votes	%
Democratic	William L. Dawson (incumbent)	71,472	75.28
Republican	Genoa S. Washington	23,470	24.72
Total votes		94,942	100.0

Illinois's 1st congressional district Democratic primary, 1956
Party	Candidate	Votes	%
Democratic	William L. Dawson (incumbent)	32,827	100.0
Total votes		32,827	100.0

Illinois's 1st congressional district general election, 1956
Party	Candidate	Votes	%
Democratic	William L. Dawson (incumbent)	66,704	64.42
Republican	George W. Lawrence	36,847	35.58
Total votes		103,551	100.0

Illinois's 1st congressional district Democratic primary, 1958
Party	Candidate	Votes	%
Democratic	William L. Dawson (incumbent)	31,706	100.0
Total votes		31,706	100.0

Illinois's 1st congressional district general election, 1958
Party	Candidate	Votes	%
Democratic	William L. Dawson (incumbent)	60,778	72.22
Republican	Dr. Theodore R. M. Howard	23,384	27.78
Total votes		84,162	100.0

Illinois's 1st congressional district Democratic primary, 1960
Party	Candidate	Votes	%
Democratic	William L. Dawson (incumbent)	41,343	100.0
Total votes		41,343	100.0

Illinois's 1st congressional district general election, 1960
Party	Candidate	Votes	%
Democratic	William L. Dawson (incumbent)	75,938	77.81
Republican	Genoa S. Washington	21,660	22.19
Total votes		97,598	100.0

Illinois's 1st congressional district Democratic primary, 1962
Party	Candidate	Votes	%
Democratic	William L. Dawson (incumbent)	45,075	79.22
Democratic	Warren De Johnette	11,823	20.78
Total votes		56,898	100.0

Illinois's 1st congressional district general election, 1962
Party	Candidate	Votes	%
Democratic	William L. Dawson (incumbent)	98,305	74.09
Republican	Benjamin C. Duster	34,379	25.91
Total votes		132,684	100.0

Illinois's 1st congressional district Democratic primary, 1964
Party	Candidate	Votes	%
Democratic	William L. Dawson (incumbent)	46,259	58.36
Democratic	A. A. Rayner, Jr.	24,498	30.91
Democratic	Charles M. Skyles	4,673	5.90
Democratic	Ronald L. Williams	3,343	4.22
Democratic	Herman A. Meeks	495	0.62
Total votes		79,268	100.0

Illinois's 1st congressional district general election, 1964
Party	Candidate	Votes	%
Democratic	William L. Dawson (incumbent)	150,953	84.91
Republican	Wilbur N. Daniel	26,823	15.09
Total votes		177,776	100.0

Illinois's 1st congressional district Democratic primary, 1966
Party	Candidate	Votes	%
Democratic	William L. Dawson (incumbent)	41,063	59.66
Democratic	Fred D. Hubbard	24,256	35.24
Democratic	Ronald L. Williams	3,515	5.11
Total votes		68,834	100.0

Illinois's 1st congressional district general election, 1966
Party	Candidate	Votes	%
Democratic	William L. Dawson (incumbent)	91,119	72.58
Republican	David R. Reed	34,421	27.42
Total votes		125,540	100.0

Illinois's 1st congressional district Democratic primary, 1968
Party	Candidate	Votes	%
Democratic	William L. Dawson (incumbent)	30,252	58.29
Democratic	A. A. Rayner, Jr.	20,102	38.73
Democratic	Rudolph Thompson	1,544	2.98
Total votes		51,898	100.0

Illinois's 1st congressional district general election, 1968
Party	Candidate	Votes	%
Democratic	William L. Dawson (incumbent)	119,207	84.56
Republican	Janet Roberts Jennings	21,758	15.44
Total votes		140,965	100.0

== See also ==
- List of African-American United States representatives
- List of African-American activists
- List of members of the United States Congress who died in office (1950–1999)

== Notes ==
U.S. House of Representatives
Preceded by Arthur Mitchell	Member of the U.S. House of Representatives from Illinois's 1st congressional district 1943–1970	Succeeded by Ralph Metcalfe
Preceded by Clare Hoffman	Chair of the House Oversight Committee; 1949–1953	Succeeded by Clare Hoffman
Preceded by Clare Hoffman	Chair of the House Oversight Committee; 1955–1970	Succeeded by Chester E. Holifield
Honorary titles
Preceded by Barratt O'Hara	Oldest member of the U.S. House of Representatives; 1969–1970	Succeeded by Emanuel Celler
