= Arthur Wergs Mitchell =

American politician (1883–1968)

Arthur W. Mitchell
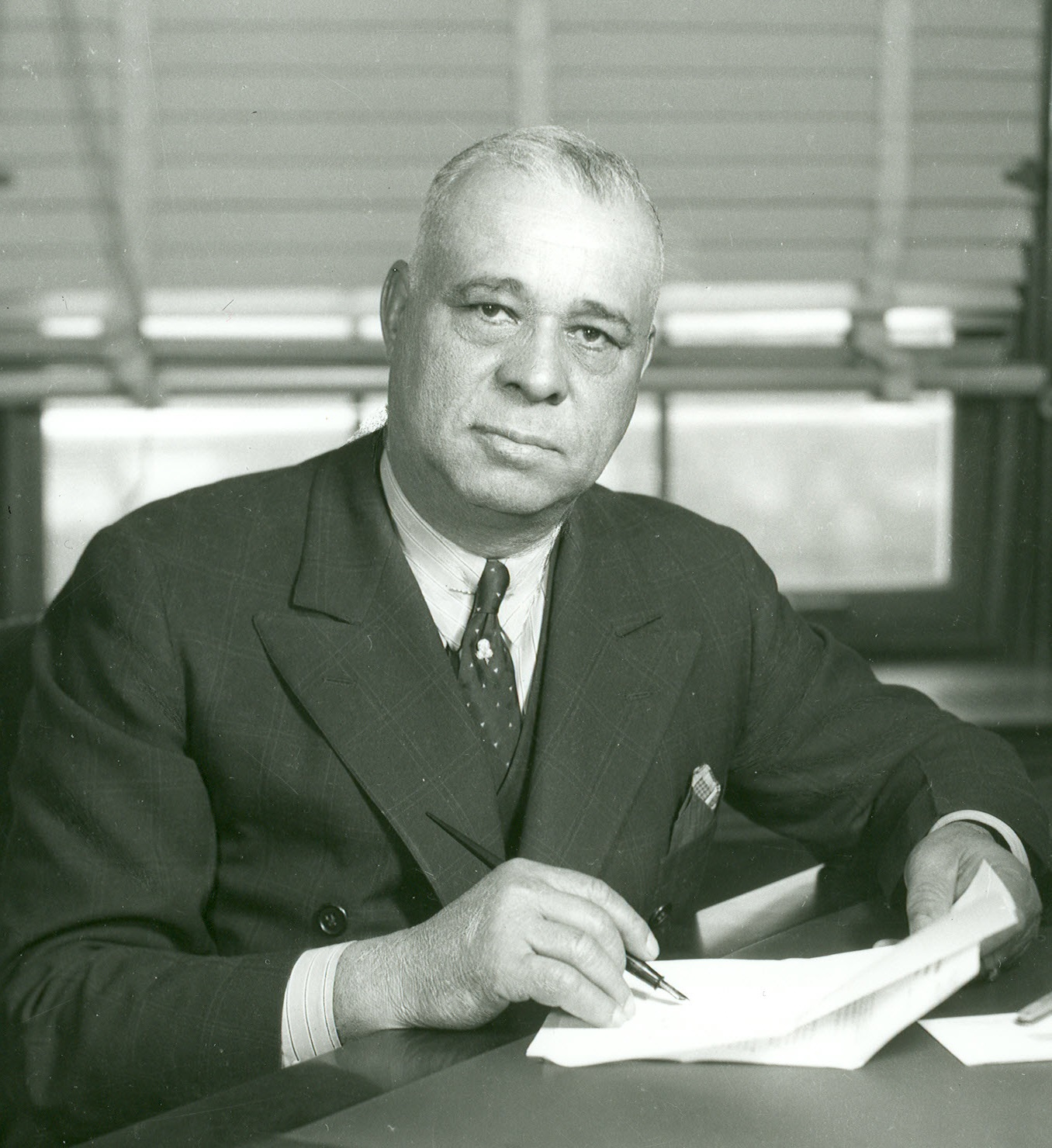

Member of the U.S. House of Representatives from Illinois's 1st district
- In office January 3, 1935 – January 3, 1943
- Preceded by: Oscar De Priest
- Succeeded by: William Dawson

Personal details
- Born: December 22, 1883 Lafayette, Alabama, U.S.
- Died: May 9, 1968 (aged 84) Petersburg, Virginia, U.S.
- Party: Republican (Until 1932) Democratic (After 1932)
- Spouse: Eula Mae King (m. January 11, 1905 – d. 1910) 1 son Annie H. Mitchell (married c. 1919 – d. March 7, 1947) Clara D. Smith (m. March 20, 1948 – his death May 9, 1968)
- Profession: Lawyer, farmer

Arthur Wergs Mitchell Sr. (December 22, 1883 – May 9, 1968) was an American politician and civil rights activist from Illinois. He represented Illinois's 1st congressional district for his entire tenure in the United States House of Representatives, from 1935 to 1943, during which time he was the only African American in Congress. A supporter of the New Deal, Mitchell was the first African American to be elected to the Congress as a Democrat.

== Early life ==
Mitchell was born to Taylor Mitchell and Emma (Patterson) in Lafayette, Alabama. He left home at 14 to attend the Tuskegee Institute. He worked on a farm and as an office boy to Booker T. Washington while attending the institute. Mitchell attended Columbia University briefly and qualified for the bar. He then moved to Chicago, Illinois and began to work for the Republican Party. Mitchell switched from the Republican Party to the Democratic Party in 1932 as he was “ambitious and impatient with the entrenched black Republican leadership, [seeking] a chance for personal advancement in the concurrent rise of the national Democratic party." He was a member of Phi Beta Sigma fraternity and served as its sixth International President, from 1926 to 1934.

== Political career ==
Mitchell was elected to the House of Representatives in 1934, defeating African American congressman Oscar De Priest, who was a Republican. During the election campaign, Mitchell emphasized his support for the New Deal and President Franklin D. Roosevelt's public relief programs, in addition to criticizing De Priest's opposition to segregation as ineffective. After Mitchell won the election with 53% of the vote, De Priest told him "I congratulate you as [the] first Negro Democratic congressman."

In Congress, Mitchell introduced bills banning lynching and against discrimination. He filed a lawsuit against the Illinois Central and Rock Island Railroads after he was forced into a segregated train car just before it passed into Arkansas. Mitchell's suit was advanced to the U.S. Supreme Court as case Mitchell v. United States, which ruled that the railroad violated the Interstate Commerce Act. He voluntarily chose not to seek re-election in 1942. As his last congressional act, Mitchell condemned politicians as preferring the Axis powers over giving Negros any rights, comparing the atrocities of the Nazis and Japanese with lynchings such as those that had recently occurred in Shubuta, Mississippi.

Despite having been elected to Congress in part on campaigning against De Priest's civil rights record as weak, Mitchell himself faced accusations by civil rights advocates of making insufficient efforts. In one instance, the NAACP deemed his introduced anti-lynching bill as too lenient.

== After Congress ==
He moved to Virginia and became a farmer, working 12 acres (4.9 hectares) of property. He died at his home in Petersburg, Virginia, on May 9, 1968.

== Electoral history ==
Illinois's 1st congressional district Democratic primary, 1934
Party	Candidate	Votes	%
Democratic	Harry Baker	7,236	44.8
Democratic	Arthur W. Mitchell	6,812	42.2
Democratic	Edgar G. Brown	1,117	6.9
Democratic	Frank J. Staufer	781	4.8
Democratic	Albert E. Redd	204	1.3
Total votes		16,150	100

Illinois's 1st congressional district general election, 1934
Party	Candidate	Votes	%
Democratic	Arthur W. Mitchell	27,963	53.0
Republican	Oscar DePriest (incumbent)	24,829	47.0
Total votes		52,792	100

Illinois's 1st congressional district Democratic primary, 1936
Party	Candidate	Votes	%
Democratic	Arthur W. Mitchell (incumbent)	16,332	79.5
Democratic	George C. Adams	2,491	12.1
Democratic	Hugh J. Daly	1,722	8.4
Total votes		20,545	100

Illinois's 1st congressional district general election, 1936
Party	Candidate	Votes	%
Democratic	Arthur W. Mitchell (incumbent)	35,376	55.1
Republican	Oscar DePriest	28,640	44.6
Independent	Harry Haywood	192	0.3
Total votes		64,208	100

Illinois's 1st congressional district Democratic primary, 1938
Party	Candidate	Votes	%
Democratic	Arthur W. Mitchell (incumbent)	16,995	81.6
Democratic	Augustus L. Williams	2,703	13.0
Democratic	James P. Durden	1,132	5.4
Write-in		1	nil
Total votes		20,831	100

Illinois's 1st congressional district general election, 1938
Party	Candidate	Votes	%
Democratic	Arthur W. Mitchell (incumbent)	30,207	53.4
Republican	William L. Dawson	26,396	46.6
Total votes		56,603	100

Illinois's 1st congressional district Democratic primary, 1940
Party	Candidate	Votes	%
Democratic	Arthur W. Mitchell (incumbent)	17,767	84.1
Democratic	Willard S. Townsend	3,358	15.9
Total votes		21,125	100

Illinois's 1st congressional district general election, 1940
Party	Candidate	Votes	%
Democratic	Arthur W. Mitchell (incumbent)	34,641	53.0
Republican	William E. King	30,698	47.0
Total votes		65,339	100

== See also ==
- List of African-American United States representatives
- List of Phi Beta Sigma members
- Timeline of African-American firsts

== External sources ==
- United States Congress. "Arthur Wergs Mitchell (id: M000805)". Biographical Directory of the United States Congress.
- Barnes, Catherine A. (1983). Journey From Jim Crow: The Desegregation of Southern Transit. New York: Columbia University Press. ISBN 9780231053808.
- O'Connor, Allison (November 14, 2007). Arthur Wergs Mitchell (1883–1968). BlackPast.

U.S. House of Representatives
Preceded by Oscar S. De Priest	Member of the U.S. House of Representatives from Illinois's 1st congressional district 1935–1943	Succeeded by William L. Dawson
