= Samuel A. McIvor =

American politician

Samuel A. McIver

Member of the Georgia House of Representatives from the Liberty County district

Personal details
- Born: Georgia, U.S.
- Party: Republican
- Profession: Politician

Samuel A. McIvor was an American politician. He served in the Georgia House of Representatives representing Liberty County, Georgia.

== Early life ==
McIvor was one of the first African-Americans to register to vote in 1867 after the Reconstruction Act was passed.

== Career ==
During the 1888–89 session, McIvor introduced a bill to create a state university for African Americans. In July 1889, he participated in a procession of over 200 legislators to dedicate the newly built Georgia State Capitol. He was the only Black person in the entire procession.
