= Lectured Crawford =

Member of the Georgia House of Representatives from the McIntosh County district

Personal details
- Born: 1842
- Died: December 1901 (aged 58–59)
- Party: Republican

Lectured Crawford (1842 – December 1901) was a teacher, A.M.E. Church minister, and state legislator in Georgia. He was one of the last African American legislators in Georgia prior to the prohibition on Black people holding office in the state.

Crawford represented McIntosh County, Georgia. He contested an election outcome. He supported pensions for Georgia's Confederate soldiers.

He was one of several African Americans to represent the county in the Georgia House during and after Reconstruction.

== See also ==
- African American officeholders from the end of the Civil War until before 1900
- List of African-American officeholders (1900–1959)
