= List of party switchers in the United States =

== Switches by Democrats ==
=== Democratic to Republican ===
==== 1850–1899 ====
- 1855 – Reuben Fenton, while U.S. representative from New York (1853–1855 and 1857–1864), later governor of New York (1865–1868) and U.S. senator from New York (1869–1875)
- 1856 – Simon Cameron, while U.S. senator from Pennsylvania (1856–1861 and 1867–1877) and United States secretary of war (1861–1862)
- 1856 – Galusha A. Grow, while U.S. representative from Pennsylvania (1851–1863 and 1894–1903), later 28th speaker of the United States House of Representatives (1861–1863)
- 1856 – Hannibal Hamlin, while U.S. senator for Maine (1848–1861 and 1869–1881), later governor of Maine (1857) and 15th vice president of the United States (1861–1865)
- 1856 – Glenni William Scofield, while U.S. representative from Pennsylvania (1863–1875)
- 1860s – Ambrose Burnside, later Governor of Rhode Island (1866–1869) and U.S. senator from Rhode Island (1875–1881)
- 1860s – Benjamin Franklin Butler, later became U.S. representative from Massachusetts (1867–1875 and 1877–1879) and governor of Massachusetts (1883–1884)
- 1860s – James M. Hinds, later U.S. representative from Arkansas (1868)
- 1864 – Thompson Campbell, former U.S. representative from Illinois (1851–1853)
- 1865 – John A. Logan, while U.S. representative from Illinois (1853–1862 and 1867–1871), later U.S. senator from Illinois (1871–1877 and 1879–1886)
- 1865 – Knute Nelson, later U.S. representative from Minnesota (1883–1889), governor of Minnesota (1893–1895), and U.S. senator from Minnesota (1895–1923)
- 1867 – John Adams Dix, former United States secretary of the treasury (1861) & U.S. senator from New York (1845–1849); later governor of New York (1873–1874)
- 1869 – David P. Lewis, later governor of Alabama (1872–1874)
- 1870 – James Lawrence Orr, former speaker of the United States House of Representatives (1857–1859) and U.S. representative (1849–1859), later governor of South Carolina (1865–1868)
- 1893 – James A. Walker, lieutenant governor of Virginia (1878–1882), later U.S. representative for Virginia (1895–1899)
- 1896 – Irving W. Drew, former New Hampshire state senator, later U.S. senator from New Hampshire (1918)

==== 1900–1949 ====
- 1904 – Harry M. Wurzbach, later U.S. representative from Texas (1921–1929 and 1930–1931)
- 1911 – Octaviano Ambrosio Larrazolo, later governor of New Mexico (1919–1921) and U.S. senator from New Mexico (1928–1929)
- 1933 – Raymond Moley, adviser to President Franklin D. Roosevelt
- 1939 – Wendell Willkie, later Republican nominee for president in 1940
- 1940 – Jack Porter, challenger to Lyndon Johnson in the 1948 Texas Senate elections
- 1946 – Rudolph G. Tenerowicz, former U.S. representative from Michigan (1939–1943)
- 1947 – John Aspinwall Roosevelt, son of President Franklin D. Roosevelt
- 1948 – J. Thomas Watson, former Florida Attorney General (1941–1949)
- 1949 – Joseph A. McArdle, former U.S. representative from Pennsylvania (1939–1942)
- 1949 – Rush D. Holt Sr., former U.S. senator from West Virginia (1935–1941)

==== 1950–1959 ====
- 1951 – John Tower, later U.S. senator from Texas (1961–1985)
- 1951- Thad Hutchinson, future chair of the Republican Party of Texas
- 1952 – Alphonzo E. Bell Jr., later U.S. representative from California (1961–1977)
- 1952 – Henry Hyde, later U.S. representative from Illinois (1975–2007)
- 1955 – Ben Adamowski, later Cook County State's Attorney
- 1956 – Johnston Murray, former governor of Oklahoma (1951–1955)
- 1958 – Phil Ferguson, former U.S. representative from Oklahoma (1935–1941), Republican nominee for Governor of Oklahoma in 1958
- 1958 – Odell Pollard, later chair of the Arkansas Republican Party

==== 1960–1969 ====
- 1960 – Robert Daniel, later U.S. representative from Virginia (1973–1983)
- 1960 – Claude R. Kirk Jr., later governor of Florida (1967–1971)
- 1960 – Arthur Ravenel Jr., South Carolina state representative, later U.S. representative from South Carolina (1987–1995)
- 1960 – Marion Hartzog Smoak, later Chief of Protocol of the United States (1972–1974)
- 1961 – Jack Cox, former Texas state representative
- 1962 – Jim Gardner, later U.S. representative (1967–1969) and lieutenant governor (1989–1993) of North Carolina
- 1962 – W. Don MacGillivray, California state representative
- 1962 – James D. Martin, later U.S. representative from Alabama (1965–1967)
- 1962 – David McCain, Florida Supreme Court justice
- 1962 – Ronald Reagan, while an actor and former Screen Actors Guild president, later 33rd governor of California (1967–1975) and 40th president of the United States (1981–1989)
- 1962 – Floyd Spence, South Carolina state representative, later a U.S. representative from South Carolina (1971–2001)
- 1962 – Dave Treen, later U.S. representative from Louisiana (1973–1980) and governor of Louisiana (1980–1984)
- 1963 – FitzGerald Bemiss, Virginia state senator
- 1963 – James H. Boyce, later chairman of the Louisiana Republican Party
- 1963 – M. Patton Echols, Virginia state senator
- 1963 – Burnet R. Maybank Jr., former Lieutenant Governor of South Carolina (1959–1963)
- 1963 – Stanford Morse, Mississippi state senator
- 1963 – Rubel Phillips, former Mississippi public service commissioner
- 1963 – Edward Lunn Young, later U.S. representative from South Carolina (1973–1975)
- 1964 – Arthur Glenn Andrews, later U.S. representative from Alabama (1965–1967)
- 1964 – Iris Faircloth Blitch, former U.S. representative from Georgia (1955–1963)
- 1964 – Howard Callaway, later U.S. representative from Georgia (1965–1967) and United States secretary of the Army (1973–1975)
- 1964 – William Dickinson, later a U.S. representative from Alabama (1965–1993)
- 1964 – John Paul Hammerschmidt, later U.S. representative from Arkansas (1967–1993)
- 1964 – Charles W. Pickering, later Mississippi state senator and judge of the United States District Court for the Southern District of Mississippi (2004)
- 1964 – Clarke Reed, later chairman of the Mississippi Republican Party
- 1964 – Strom Thurmond, while U.S. senator from South Carolina (1954–2003)
- 1964 – Faith Whittlesey, Pennsylvania state representative
- 1965 – Arthur R. Outlaw, mayor of Mobile, Alabama
- 1965 – George Yarbrough, Mississippi state senator
- 1966 – Fred Connors, South Carolina state representative
- 1966 – Henry Grover, Texas state representative
- 1966 – Jerome Hughes, South Carolina state representative
- 1966 – Reid Moore Jr., Florida state representative
- 1967 – Bill Archer, Texas health commissioner, later a U.S. representative (1971–2001)
- 1967 – David L. Brower, Florida state representative
- 1967 – Thad Cochran, later a U.S. representative from Mississippi (1973–1978) and U.S. senator from Mississippi (1978–2018)
- 1967 – Jerry H. Geisler, Virginia state representative
- 1967 – Jack B. Ray, State treasurer of Georgia (1965–71)
- 1967 – Ronnie Thompson, mayor of Macon, Georgia
- 1968 – Grailey Berryhill, Tennessee state representative
- 1968 – James L. Bentley, Comptroller General of Georgia (1963–1971)
- 1968 – Jim Caldwell, Arkansas state representative
- 1968 – Phil Campbell, Commissioner of Agriculture of Georgia (1955–1969)
- 1968 – Sanford Charron, former Michigan state representative
- 1968 – William E. Dannemeyer, former California state representative and later U.S. representative from California (1979–1993)
- 1968 – R. Earl Dixon, Florida state representative
- 1968 – Alpha A. Fowler Jr., member of the Georgia Public Service Commission
- 1968 – Gordon McLendon, radio broadcaster and frequent political candidate in Texas
- 1968 – Curtis S. Person Jr., Tennessee state representative
- 1968 – Crawford Pilcher, member of the Georgia Public Service Commission
- 1969 – Guy O. Farley Jr., Virginia state representative
- 1969 – Raymond R. Guest Jr., Virginia state representative
- 1969 – Donald Hazelton, Florida state representative

==== 1970–1979 ====
- 1970 – Bob Barr, later U.S. representative from Georgia (1995–2003)
- 1970 – John Chichester, Virginia state senator
- 1970 – A. C. Clemons, Louisiana state senator (1960–1972)
- 1970 – Sterling Cockrill, Arkansas state representative
- 1970 – J. Robert Cooper, Georgia state representative
- 1970 – Jesse Helms, later U.S. senator from North Carolina (1973–2003)
- 1970 – William Oswald Mills, later U.S. representative from Maryland (1971–1973)
- 1971 – Tillie K. Fowler, later U.S. representative from Florida (1993–2001)
- 1971 – James Nowlin, Texas state representative
- 1972 – Thomas F. Hartnett, later U.S. representative from South Carolina (1981–1987)
- 1972 – Trent Lott, later U.S. representative from Mississippi (1973–1989) and U.S. senator from Mississippi (1989–2007)
- 1972 – Robert R. Neall, later secretary of the Maryland Department of Health (2018–2020)
- 1972 – Graham Purcell Jr., U.S. representative from Texas (1962–1973)
- 1973 – John Connally, former United States secretary of the treasury (1971–1972) and former governor of Texas (1963–1969)
- 1973 – Mills E. Godwin Jr., former governor of Virginia (1966–1970) and lieutenant Governor of Virginia (1962–1966), later re-elected governor of Virginia (1974–1978)
- 1973 – Samuel I. Hayakawa, president of San Francisco State University, later U.S. senator from California (1977–1983)
- 1975 – Elizabeth Dole, later United States secretary of transportation (1983–1987), United States secretary of labor (1989–1990) and U.S. senator from North Carolina (2003–2009)
- 1975 – John Jarman, while U.S. representative from Oklahoma (1951–1977)
- 1976 – Leon Bramlett, former chair of the Mississippi Democratic Party
- 1976 – Shirley Winsley, Washington state representative
- 1977 – Lane Carson, Louisiana state representative
- 1977 – A. J. McNamara, Louisiana state representative
- 1978 – Michele Bachmann, later U.S. representative from Minnesota (2007–2015)
- 1978 – Thomas Bliley, mayor of Richmond, Virginia, and later U.S. representative from Virginia (1981–2001)
- 1978 – Robert G. Jones, Louisiana state senator
- 1978 – Chris Smith, later U.S. representative from New Jersey (1981–present)
- 1979 – Clay Ford, former Arkansas state representative and later a Florida state representative
- 1979 – Armistead I. Selden Jr., former U.S. representative from Alabama (1953–1969) and United States ambassador to New Zealand (1974–1979)

==== 1980–1989 ====
- 1980s – Mike Pence, future U.S. representative for Indiana (2001–2013), governor of Indiana (2013–2017) and vice president of the United States (2017–2021)
- 1980 – Mac Collins, later U.S. representative from Georgia (1993–2005)
- 1980 – Jim Donelon, later Louisiana insurance commissioner (2006–2024)
- 1980 – Jesse Monroe Knowles, Louisiana state senator
- 1980 – John Otho Marsh Jr., former U.S. representative from Virginia (1963–1971), and future U.S. secretary of the Army (1981–1989)
- 1980 – Frank D. White, later governor of Arkansas (1981–1983)
- 1980 – Sam Yorty, former U.S. representative for California (1951–1955) and mayor of Los Angeles, California (1961–1973)
- 1981 – Eugene Atkinson, while U.S. representative from Pennsylvania (1979–1983)
- 1981 – Larry Kudlow, later director of the National Economic Council (2018–2021)
- 1981 – Pete von Reichbauer, Washington state senator
- 1981 – Bob Stump, while U.S. representative from Arizona (1977–2003)
- 1982 – Condoleezza Rice, later United States national security advisor (2001–2005) and United States secretary of state (2005–2009)
- 1982 – Franklin Sutton, Georgia state senator
- 1982 – Joseph P. Wyatt Jr., former U.S. representative from Texas (1979–1981)
- 1983 – Phil Gramm, while U.S. representative from Texas (1979–1985) and later U.S. senator from Texas (1985–2002)
- 1983 – Bob Martinez, while mayor of Tampa, Florida, later governor of Florida (1987–1991) and director of the National Drug Control Policy (1991–1993)
- 1983 – Edward D.L.G. Pangelinan, while resident representative from the Northern Mariana Islands (1978–1984)
- 1984 – V.J. Bella, Louisiana state representative
- 1984 – Sonny Callahan, Alabama state senator, later U.S. representative from Alabama (1985–2003)
- 1984 – Andy Ireland, while U.S. representative from Florida (1977–1993)
- 1984 – Eddie Knox, mayor of Charlotte, North Carolina
- 1985 – Kent Hance, former U.S. representative from Texas (1979–1985)
- 1985 – Edward J. King, former governor of Massachusetts (1979–1983)
- 1985 – Jeane Kirkpatrick, while U.S. ambassador to the United Nations (1981–1985)
- 1985 – Dexter Lehtinen, Florida state representative, later U.S. attorney for the Southern District of Florida (1988–1992)
- 1986 – Richard Baker, Louisiana state representative, later U.S. representative from Louisiana (1987–2008)
- 1986 – William Bennett, while U.S. secretary of education (1985–1988)
- 1986 – Charles T. Canady, Florida state representative, later U.S. representative from Florida (1993–2001), justice of the Supreme Court of Florida (2008–present) and chief justice of the Supreme Court of Florida (2010–2012)
- 1986 – Frank Rizzo, former mayor of Philadelphia, Pennsylvania
- 1986 – James David Santini, former U.S. representative from Nevada (1975–1983)
- 1987 – Paul Hardy, former secretary of state of Louisiana (1976–1980), later lieutenant governor of Louisiana (1988–1992)
- 1987 – Roy Moore, later chief justice of the Alabama Supreme Court (2001–2003)
- 1987 – Sam Panayotovich, while Illinois state representative and political ally of Edward Vrdolyak (below)
- 1987 – James C. Smith, attorney general of Florida (1979–1987), later Florida secretary of state (1987–1995)
- 1987 – Edward Vrdolyak (born 1937), while Chicago city councilmember.
- 1988 – David Duke, Louisiana state representative
- 1988 – Mike Johanns, later governor of Nebraska (1999–2005), United States secretary of agriculture (2005–2007) and U.S. senator from Nebraska (2009–2015)
- 1988 – Jim McCrery, later U.S. representative from Louisiana (1988–2009)
- 1988 – John Rice, Alabama state senator
- 1989 – John Amari, Alabama state senator
- 1989 – Bill Grant, while U.S. representative from Florida (1987–1991)
- 1989 – Pete Johnson, while state auditor of Mississippi (1988–1992)
- 1989 – W. Fox McKeithen, secretary of state of Louisiana (1988–2005)
- 1989 – Harvey S. Peeler Jr., South Carolina state senator
- 1989 – Rick Perry, Texas state representative, later agriculture commissioner of Texas and governor of Texas (2000–2015)
- 1989 – Tommy F. Robinson, while U.S. representative from Arkansas (1985–1991)

==== 1990–1999 ====
- 1990 – Jason Chaffetz, later U.S. representative from Utah (2009–2017)
- 1990 – Lauch Faircloth, later U.S. senator from North Carolina (1993–1999)
- 1990 – Vito Fossella, later U.S. representative from New York (1997–2009)
- 1990 – Tom Vandergriff, former U.S. representative from Texas (1983–1985)
- 1991 – David Beasley, later governor of South Carolina (1995–1999)
- 1991 – Buddy Roemer, while governor of Louisiana (1988–1992)
- 1991 – Bret Schundler, mayor of Jersey City, New Jersey
- 1992 – Mark Candon, former member of the Vermont House of Representatives, later the Republican nominee for Vermont's at-large congressional district in 1998
- 1992 – Byron Looper, Tennessee state representative
- 1993 – Edward H. Krebs, Pennsylvania state representative
- 1993 – Pedro G. Nieto, Texas state representative
- 1993 – J. Roland Smith, South Carolina state representative
- 1994 – Ed Austin, while mayor of Jacksonville, Florida
- 1994 – Eli Bebout, Wyoming state representative
- 1994 – Mike Bowers, while attorney general of Georgia (1981–1997)
- 1994 – Bill Finkbeiner, Washington state representative
- 1994 – Fob James, former governor of Alabama (1979–1983), later re-elected as governor of Alabama (1995–1999)
- 1994 – Woody Jenkins, Louisiana state representative
- 1994 – Walter B. Jones, while running as a Democrat for U.S. House from North Carolina. U.S. representative from North Carolina (1995–2019)
- 1994 – Richard Shelby, while U.S. senator from Alabama (1987–2023)
- 1994 – Ed Whitfield, the day before filing as a candidate for the U.S. House in Kentucky. U.S. representative from Kentucky (1995–2016)
- 1995 – Ben Nighthorse Campbell, while U.S. senator from Colorado (1993–2005)
- 1995 – Tom Campbell, Washington state representative
- 1995 – Warren Chisum, Texas state representative
- 1995 – Rusty Crowe, Tennessee state senator
- 1995 – Nathan Deal, while U.S. representative from Georgia (1993–2011), later became the 82nd governor of Georgia (2011–2019)
- 1995 – Mike Foster, later governor of Louisiana (1996–2004)
- 1995 – Milton H. Hamilton, Jr, Tennessee state senator
- 1995 – Jimmy Hayes, while U.S. representative from Louisiana (1987–1997)
- 1995 – Greg Laughlin, while U.S. representative from Texas (1989–1997)
- 1995 – Susana Martinez, later governor of New Mexico (2011–2019)
- 1995 – Dave Mastin, Washington state representative
- 1995 – Mike Parker, while U.S. representative from Mississippi (1989–1999)
- 1995 – Molly Spearman, South Carolina state representative; later South Carolina superintendent of education (2015–2023)
- 1995 – Billy Tauzin, while U.S. representative from Louisiana (1980–2005)
- 1996 – Thomas C. Alexander, South Carolina state senator
- 1996 – Norm Coleman, mayor of Saint Paul, Minnesota; later U.S. senator (2003–2009)
- 1996 – Ronnie Culbreth, Georgia state representative
- 1996 – John Hoeven, later governor of North Dakota (2000–2010) and U.S. senator (2011–present)
- 1996 – Hugh Leatherman, South Carolina state senator
- 1996 – Cleta Mitchell, former Oklahoma state representative
- 1996 – Paul Zellinsky, Washington state representative
- 1997 – Chip Bailey, Alabama state senator
- 1997 – Bradley Byrne, member of the Alabama State Board of Education and later U.S. representative from Alabama (2014–2021)
- 1997 – Ronald Johnson, Alabama state representative
- 1997 – Kevin Mannix, Oregon state representative
- 1997 – Steve Windom, Alabama state senator, later lieutenant governor of Alabama (1999–2003)
- 1998 – Gerald Allen, Alabama state representative
- 1998 – Herman Badillo, former U.S. representative from New York (1971–1977)
- 1998 – David G. Boschert, Maryland state delegate
- 1998 – Steve Flowers, Alabama state representative
- 1998 – Harry Goode, Florida state representative
- 1998 – Sonny Perdue, Georgia state senator, later became the 81st governor of Georgia (2003–2011) and the 31st United States secretary of agriculture
- 1998 – George Wallace Jr., former Alabama state treasurer (1987–1995)
- 1999 – Nancy Larraine Hoffmann, New York state senator
- 1999 – Dan Seum, Kentucky state representative

==== 2000–2009 ====
- 2001 – Greg Delleney, South Carolina state representative
- 2001 – Blaine Galliher, Alabama state representative
- 2001 – J. Verne Smith, South Carolina state senator
- 2002 – Rooney Bowen, Georgia state senator
- 2002 – Terry C. Burton, Mississippi state senator
- 2002 – Franklin B. Mann, former Florida state senator
- 2002 – Videt Carmichael, Mississippi state senator
- 2002 – Don Cheeks, Georgia state senator
- 2002 – Jack Hill, Georgia state senator
- 2002 – Kay Ivey, later state treasurer of Alabama (2003–2011), lieutenant governor of Alabama (2011–2017), and governor of Alabama (2017–present)
- 2002 – Dan Lee, Georgia state senator
- 2002 – Olga A. Méndez, New York state senator
- 2002 – Joseph Robach, New York state assemblymember
- 2002 – Amy Tuck, while lieutenant governor of Mississippi (2000–2008)
- 2003 – Larry Baker, Mississippi state representative
- 2003 – Jim Barnett, Mississippi state representative
- 2003 – Herb Frierson, Mississippi state representative
- 2003 – Frank Hamilton, Mississippi state representative
- 2003 – Travis Little, Mississippi state senator
- 2003 – William H. O'Dell, South Carolina state senator
- 2003 – John Read, Mississippi state representative
- 2003 – Melinda Schwegmann, former lieutenant governor of Louisiana (1992–1996)
- 2003 – Rick Sheehy, mayor of Hastings, Nebraska
- 2004 – Rodney Alexander, while U.S. representative from Louisiana (2004–2013)
- 2004 – Ralph Doxey, Mississippi state senator
- 2004 – Ralph Hall, while U.S. representative from Texas (1981–2015)
- 2004 – Luke A. Rankin, South Carolina state senator
- 2004 – Carl Rogers, Georgia state representative
- 2005 – Michael Diven, Pennsylvania state representative
- 2006 – Mickey Channell, Georgia state representative
- 2006 – John Giannetti, Maryland state senator
- 2006 – Jimmy Holley, Alabama state senator
- 2006 – Will Kendrick, Florida state representative
- 2006 – Don McLeary, Tennessee state senator
- 2006 – Billy Montgomery, Louisiana state representative
- 2006 – Butch Parrish, Georgia state representative
- 2007 – Tommy Gollott, Mississippi state senator
- 2007 – Jimmy Holley, Alabama state senator
- 2007 – Frank A. Howard, sheriff of Vernon Parish, Louisiana
- 2007 – Mike Jacobs, Georgia state representative
- 2007 – John Neely Kennedy, while state treasurer of Louisiana (2000–2017), later U.S. senator for Louisiana (2017–present)
- 2007 – Dawn Pettengill, Iowa state representative
- 2008 – Todd Ames Hunter, former Texas state representative
- 2008 – Nolan Mettetal, Mississippi state senator
- 2009 – Chuck Hopson, Texas state representative
- 2009 – Dennis Moss, South Carolina state representative
- 2009 – Billy Nicholson, Mississippi state representative
- 2009 – Tom Salmon, while Vermont auditor of accounts (2007–2013)
- 2009 – Tom Saviello, Maine state representative

==== 2010–2019 ====
- 2010 – John Alario, Louisiana state senator
- 2010 – Scott Angelle, while lieutenant governor of Louisiana (2010), later director of the Bureau of Safety and Environmental Enforcement (2017–2021)
- 2010 – Ellis Black, Georgia state representative
- 2010 – Alan Boothe, Alabama state representative
- 2010 – C. Scott Bounds, Mississippi state representative
- 2010 – Amy Carter, Georgia state representative
- 2010 – Simone B. Champagne, Louisiana state representative
- 2010 – Mike Cheokas, Georgia state representative
- 2010 – Noble Ellington, Louisiana state representative
- 2010 – Bubber Epps, Georgia state representative
- 2010 – Tim Golden, Georgia state senator
- 2010 – Gerald Greene, Georgia state representative
- 2010 – Bob Hanner, Georgia state representative
- 2010 – Walker Hines, Louisiana state representative
- 2010 – Steve Hurst, Alabama state representative
- 2010 – Cindy Hyde-Smith, Mississippi state senator, later state agriculture commissioner and U.S. senator
- 2010 – Steve Levy, county executive of Suffolk County, New York
- 2010 – Doug McKillip, Georgia state representative
- 2010 – Mike Millican, Alabama state representative
- 2010 – Fred Mills, Louisiana state representative
- 2010 – Eldon Nygaard, South Dakota state senator
- 2010 – Aaron Pena, Texas state representative
- 2010 – Alan Powell, Georgia state representative
- 2010 – Jim Preuitt, Alabama state senator
- 2010 – Allan Ritter, Texas state representative
- 2010 – Bobby Shows, Mississippi state representative
- 2010 – John Smith, Louisiana state senator
- 2010 – Chris Steineger, Kansas state senator
- 2010 – Lesley Vance, Alabama state representative
- 2010 – Mike Willette, Maine state representative
- 2011 – Jody Amedee, Louisiana state senator
- 2011 – Taylor Barras, Louisiana state representative
- 2011 – Donnie Bell, Mississippi state representative
- 2011 – Tom Butler, Alabama state senator
- 2011 – Buddy Caldwell, while Louisiana attorney general (2008–2016)
- 2011 – Norby Chabert, Louisiana state senator
- 2011 – Billy Chandler, Louisiana state representative
- 2011 – Charles "Bubba" Chaney, Louisiana state representative
- 2011 – Linda Collins, Arkansas state representative
- 2011 – Charles Graddick, Alabama circuit judge and former attorney general of Alabama (1979–1987)
- 2011 – Mark Grisanti, New York state senator
- 2011 – Bob Hensgens, mayor of Gueydan, Louisiana
- 2011 – Mike "Pete" Huval, Louisiana state representative
- 2011 – Bert Jones, North Carolina state representative
- 2011 – Ezell Lee, Mississippi state senator
- 2011 – Russ Nowell, Mississippi state representative
- 2011 – Margaret Rogers, Mississippi state representative
- 2011 – Jim Slezak, Michigan state representative
- 2011 – Jeff Smith, Mississippi state representative
- 2011 – Gray Tollison, Mississippi state senator
- 2012 – Mike Braun, later U.S. senator for Indiana (2019–2025), and Governor of Indiana (2025–present)
- 2012 – Jerry L. Fielding, Alabama state senator
- 2012 – Alan Harper, Alabama state representative
- 2012 – José Manuel Lozano, Texas state representative
- 2012 – Roy Schmidt, Michigan state representative
- 2012 – Christine Watkins, Utah state representative
- 2012 – Jason White, Mississippi state representative
- 2012 – Arthur J. Williams, North Carolina state representative
- 2013 – Nickey Browning, Mississippi state senator
- 2013 – James R. Fannin, Louisiana state representative
- 2013 – Ryan Ferns, West Virginia state representative
- 2013 – Elbert Guillory, Louisiana State senator
- 2013 – Lindsey Holmes, Alaska state representative
- 2013 – Evan Jenkins, West Virginia state representative. Later U.S. representative from West Virginia (2015–2018) and Justice of Supreme Court of Appeals of West Virginia (2018–2022)
- 2013 – Andy Nuñez, New Mexico state representative
- 2013 – Rick Ward, III, Louisiana state senator
- 2014 – Linda Black, Missouri state representative
- 2014 – Daniel Hall, West Virginia state senator
- 2014 – Mark Miloscia, Washington state representative
- 2014 – Charles Newton, Alabama state representative
- 2014 – Andy Nuñez, New Mexico State representative
- 2014 – Randall Patterson, Mississippi state representative
- 2014 – Janice Pauls, Kansas state representative
- 2014 – Gene Taylor, former U.S. representative from Mississippi (1989–2011)
- 2015 – Carlyle Begay, Arizona state senator
- 2015 – Denver Butler, Kentucky state representative
- 2015 – Kim Davis, county clerk of Rowan County, Kentucky
- 2015 – Sandra Doorley, district attorney of Monroe County, New York
- 2015 – Jim Gooch Jr., Kentucky state representative
- 2015 – Eric Greitens, later governor of Missouri (2016–2018)
- 2015 – Mike Holcomb, Arkansas state representative
- 2015 – Omarosa Manigault, later director of communications for the Office of Public Liaison (2017)
- 2015 – Jody Steverson, Mississippi state representative
- 2016 – David Hillman, Arkansas state representative
- 2016 – Joe Jett, Arkansas state representative
- 2016 – Bob Lessard, former Minnesota state senator
- 2016 – Karen MacBeth, Rhode Island state representative
- 2016 – Yancey McGill, former lieutenant governor of South Carolina (2014–2015)
- 2016 – Wilbur Ross, later United States Secretary of Commerce (2017–2021)
- 2016 – Jeff Wardlaw, Arkansas state representative
- 2017 – William Brisson, North Carolina assemblyman
- 2017 – Mariellen MacKay, New Hampshire state representative
- 2017 – Rupert Phillips, West Virginia state delegate
- 2017 – Michelle Rehwinkel Vasilinda, former Florida state representative
- 2017 – Robert Theberge, New Hampshire state representative
- 2018 – Bobby Bright, former U.S. representative from Alabama (2009–2011)
- 2018 – Ken Luttrell, Oklahoma state representative
- 2018 – Johnny Tadlock, Oklahoma state representative
- 2018 – Ivanka Trump, daughter of President Donald Trump and Advisor to the President
- 2019 – Nick Bain, Mississippi state representative
- 2019 – Carroll Hubbard, former U.S. representative from Kentucky (1975–1993)
- 2019 – Jeff Van Drew, while U.S. representative from New Jersey (2019–present)
- 2019 – Wanda Vázquez Garced, while governor of Puerto Rico (2019–2021) and former Secretary of Justice of Puerto Rico (2017–2019)

==== 2020–present ====
- 2020 – Jason Barrett, West Virginia state representative
- 2020 – Kevin Horan, Mississippi state representative
- 2021 – Mick Bates, West Virginia state delegate
- 2021 – Ryan Guillen, Texas state representative
- 2021 – John Jay Lee, mayor of North Las Vegas, Nevada
- 2021 – Vernon Jones, former Georgia state representative
- 2021 – Jon Ray Lancaster, Mississippi state representative
- 2021 – John Sims Jr., Kentucky state representative
- 2021 – Inna Vernikov, later New York City councilmember
- 2022 – Elaine Beech, former Alabama state representative
- 2022 – Alec Brook-Krasny, New York state assemblymember
- 2022 – Glenn Jeffries, West Virginia state senator
- 2022 – Ari Kagan, New York City councilmember
- 2022 – Brandon Spencer, former Kentucky state representative
- 2023 – Tricia Cotham, North Carolina state representative
- 2023 – Dov Hikind, former New York state assemblymember
- 2023 – Eric Johnson, mayor of Dallas, Texas
- 2023 – Jeremy LaCombe, Louisiana state representative
- 2023 – Mesha Mainor, Georgia state representative
- 2023 – Elliott Pritt, West Virginia state delegate
- 2023 – Francis C. Thompson, Louisiana state representative
- 2024 – Marie Alvarado-Gil, California state senator
- 2024 – Todd Blanche, United States Deputy Attorney General (2025–present)
- 2024 – Hillary Cassel, Florida state representative
- 2024 – Matthew Coker, New Hampshire state representative
- 2024 – Sherry Gould, New Hampshire state representative
- 2024 – Mike McDonnell, Nebraska state senator
- 2024 – Gabriel Ramos, former New Mexico state senator, later re-elected
- 2024 – John S. Rodgers, former Vermont state senator, later lieutenant governor of Vermont (2025–present)
- 2024 – Gloria Romero, former California state senator
- 2024 – Doug Skaff, former West Virginia state delegate
- 2024 – Shawn Thierry, Texas state representative
- 2024 – Susan Valdes, Florida state representative
- 2025 – Ed Hale, businessman, while running for Governor of Maryland
- 2025 – Lindy Li, political commentator and campaign operative
- 2025 – Leo Pacheco, former Texas state representative
- 2025 – David Pascoe, South Carolina First Circuit Solicitor
- 2025 – Wendy Piper, former New Hampshire state representative
- 2025 – Peri Pourier, South Dakota state representative
- 2025 – Alex Villanueva, former Los Angeles County Sheriff
- 2025 – Robin L. Webb, Kentucky state senator
- 2026 – Lucas Atkinson, South Carolina state representative
- 2026 – Stephen Cloobeck, businessman and former California gubernatorial candidate
- 2026 – Elle Cochran, Hawaii state representative
- 2026 – Dale Girard, mayor of Claremont, New Hampshire and New Hampshire state representative
- 2026 – Tiffany Henyard, former mayor of Dolton, Illinois

=== Democratic to other (third) party ===
- 1878 – Hendrick Bradley Wright, U.S. representative from Pennsylvania (1853–1855, 1861–1863 and 1877–1881), ran for reelection on the Greenback Party
- 1884 – Absolom M. West, Mississippi state senator. He joined the Greenback Party and was their vice presidential candidate in 1884.
- 1995 – Dominic L. Cortese, California state representative to Reform Party.
- 1996 – Daniel Hamburg, former U.S. representative (1993–1995) to Green Party
- 2002 – Tim Penny, former U.S. representative from Minnesota (1983–1995) to Independence Party of Minnesota
- 2002 – Jill Stein, perennial presidential candidate and future Lexington town selectman, switched from Democratic to Green
- 2003 – Matt Ahearn, New Jersey state representative to Green Party.
- 2005 – Jim Lendall, Arkansas state representative to Green Party.
- 2006 – Bill Paparian, former mayor of Pasadena, California, to Green Party.
- 2007 – Cynthia McKinney, former U.S. representative from Georgia (1993–2003 and 2005–2007) to Green Party, and 2008 Green Party presidential candidate
- 2012 – Fred Smith, Arkansas state representative to Green Party.
- 2017 – Henry John Bear, Maine state representative to Maine Green Independent Party.
- 2017 – Ralph Chapman, Maine state representative to Maine Green Independent Party.
- 2017 – Joseph Stallcop, New Hampshire state representative to Libertarian Party
- 2018 – Sandra Jeff, former New Mexico state representative to Libertarian Party
- 2018 – Shane Robinson, Maryland state delegate to Maryland Green Party.
- 2021 – Andrew Yang, candidate in the 2020 Democratic Party presidential primaries and the 2021 New York City Democratic mayoral primary to Forward Party
- 2022 – Joe Sestak, former U.S. representative from Pennsylvania (2007–2011) to Forward Party
- 2023 – Ron Tupa, former Colorado state senator to Unity Party of America
- 2025 – Paul Johnson, former Mayor of Phoenix to No Labels

=== Democratic to independent ===
- 1970 – Harry F. Byrd Jr., while U.S. senator from Virginia (1965–1983)
- 1991 – Lucy Killea, California state senator
- 2000s – Jeffrey Evangelos, later Maine state representative (2012–2016; 2018–2022)
- 2006 – Joe Lieberman, while U.S. senator from Connecticut (1989–2013); ran as an independent for re-election, on the Connecticut for Lieberman ballot line after losing to challenger Ned Lamont in the Democratic primary.
- 2006 – Avel Gordly, Oregon state senator.
- 2009 – Juan Arambula, California state assemblyman
- 2009 – Timothy P. Cahill, treasurer and receiver-general of Massachusetts (2003–2011)
- 2009 – Kathleen Curry, Colorado state representative
- 2010 – Bob Ziegelbauer, Wisconsin state assemblyman.
- 2013 – Richard Laird, Alabama state representative
- 2013 – John Olumba, Michigan state representative
- 2014 – Terry Hayes, Maine state treasurer (2015–2019).
- 2014 – Elissa Silverman, Washington D.C. city councilor
- 2015 – Keith English, Missouri state representative.
- 2015 – Paul Tine, North Carolina state representative.
- 2016 – Mike Huether, mayor of Sioux Falls, South Dakota.
- 2016 – Ben Jones, former U.S. representative from Georgia (1989–1993)
- 2017 – Martin Grohman, Maine state representative
- 2017 – Denise Harlow, Maine state representative
- 2017 – Cheri Jahn, Colorado state senator
- 2018 – George Flaggs Jr., mayor of Vicksburg, Mississippi
- 2018 – Solomon Goldstein-Rose, Massachusetts state representative
- 2018 – Thomas P. Koch, mayor of Quincy, Massachusetts
- 2018 – Jim Roscoe, Wyoming state representative
- 2019 – Angela Cockerham, Mississippi state representative
- 2019 – Bryce Edgmon, Alaska state representative and Speaker of the State House
- 2019 – Stephen Holland, Mississippi state representative
- 2019 – John Yudichak, Pennsylvania state senator
- 2020 – Tom Bakk, Minnesota state senator
- 2020 – Michael Evans, Mississippi state representative
- 2020 – Christina Henderson, Washington, D.C. city councilor
- 2020 – Valencia Stovall, Georgia state representative
- 2020 – David Tomassoni, Minnesota state senator
- 2021 – Jacob Candelaria, New Mexico state senator
- 2021 – Betsy Johnson, Oregon state senator
- 2022 – Corina Magofna, Northern Mariana Islands territorial representative
- 2022 – Ben Robinson, former Oklahoma state senator
- 2022 – Kenyan McDuffie, Washington, D.C. city councilor
- 2022 – John Windle, Tennessee state senator
- 2022 – Susan Wismer, former South Dakota state senator
- 2022 – Shanda Yates, Mississippi state representative
- 2023 – Kelvin Butler, Mississippi state senator
- 2023 – Shaun Filiault, New Hampshire state representative
- 2023 – Richard Henderson, former Kentucky state representative
- 2023 – Robert F. Kennedy, Jr., activist and later United States Secretary of Health and Human Services (2025–present)
- 2023 – Mia McLeod, South Carolina state senator
- 2024 – Steve Berry, former Vermont state representative
- 2024 – Cynthia Browning, former Vermont state representative
- 2024 – Mike Duggan, mayor of Detroit, Michigan (2014–present)
- 2024 – Joe Manchin, U.S. senator from West Virginia (2010–2024)
- 2024 – Nicole Shanahan, attorney and running mate of Robert F. Kennedy Jr. in the 2024 presidential election
- 2025 – Todd Achilles, Idaho state representative
- 2025 – W. Edward Crockett, Maine state representative
- 2025 – Karine Jean-Pierre, former White House press secretary (2022–2025)
- 2025 – Jason Pizzo, Florida state senator
- 2025 – Symone Sanders-Townsend, political commentator
- 2025 – Robin Tallon, former U.S. representative from South Carolina (1983–1993)
- 2026 – Curt Cobb, mayor of Bedford County, Tennessee (2026–present) and former Tennessee state representative (2003–2009)
- 2026 – Carla Cunningham, North Carolina state representative (2013–present)
- 2026 – Adlah Donastorg Jr., former member of the Virgin Islands legislature (1995–2011)
- 2026 – Nasif Majeed, North Carolina state representative (2019–present)
- 2026 – Ken Miyagishima, former mayor of Las Cruces, New Mexico (2007–2023) and candidate for governor in 2026
- 2026 – David Wecht, justice of the Pennsylvania Supreme Court (2016–present) and former vice chair of the Pennsylvania Democratic Party (1998–2001)

== Switches by Republicans ==
=== Republican to Democratic ===
==== Before 1960 ====
- 1860s – Andrew Gregg Curtin, former governor of Pennsylvania (1861–1867), later U.S. representative from Pennsylvania (1881–1887)
- 1860s – Alonzo Garcelon, later served as governor of Maine (1879–1880)
- 1860s – Henry George, American political economist and journalist, and 1886 nominee for mayor of New York City, New York
- 1867 – John Quincy Adams II, Massachusetts state representative and grandson of President John Quincy Adams
- 1868 – Salmon P. Chase, former U.S. senator from Ohio (1849–1855, 1861), governor of Ohio (1856–1860) and secretary of the treasury (1861–1864) and later chief justice of the United States (1864–1873)
- 1872 – Edmund G. Ross, former U.S. senator from Kansas (1866–1871)
- 1877 – James B. Weaver, later U.S. representative from Iowa (1879–1889)
- 1880 – Benjamin Butler, former U.S. representative from Massachusetts (1867–1879), later governor of Massachusetts (1883–1884)
- 1880 – C. H. J. Taylor, African-American journalist; later minister of Liberia (1887–1888) and recorder of deeds for the District of Columbia (1893–1897)
- 1893 – George Edwin Taylor, newspaper editor and later president of the National Negro Democratic League.
- 1905 – John Francis Wheaton, former Minnesota state representative (1899–1900); first African American to serve in the Minnesota House of Representatives
- 1908 – Lincoln Loy McCandless (1859–1940), later delegate to the U.S. House from Hawaii Territory's at-large congressional district (1933–1935)
- 1920s – Ferdinand Lee Barnett, founding editor of The Chicago Conservator and husband of Ida B. Wells.
- 1922 – Royal S. Copeland, later U.S. senator from New York (1923–1938)
- 1928 – Joseph S. Clark Jr., later Mayor of Philadelphia, U.S. senator from Pennsylvania (1957–1969)
- 1930s – Charles Edison, later governor of New Jersey (1941–1944)
- 1932 – Mary McLeod Bethune, activist and member of the Black Cabinet during Franklin D. Roosevelt's administration.
- 1932 – Charles Diggs Sr., later Michigan state senator (1937–1944)
- 1932 – Arthur W. Mitchell, later U.S. representative from Illinois (1935–1943)
- 1932 – Robert Russa Moton, principal of Tuskegee Institute.
- 1932 – Phelps Phelps, New York assemblyman, later governor of American Samoa (1951–1952)
- 1932 – Robert Lee Vann, publisher and editor of the Pittsburgh Courier
- 1933 – Marshall L. Shepard, later a Pennsylvania state representative.
- 1936 – Elizabeth Simpson Drewry, later a West Virginia state delegate and its first African American member (1951–1966)
- 1936 – Ellis E. Patterson, California state assemblyman, later lieutenant governor of California (1939–1943) and U.S. representative from California (1945–1947)
- 1939 – Corneal A. Davis, later an Illinois state representative (1943–1979)
- 1939 – William L. Dawson, later U.S. representative from Illinois (1943–1970)
- 1939 – Christopher C. Wimbish, later Illinois state senator (1943–1947)
- 1940 – George W. Crockett, Jr., later U.S. representative from Michigan (1980–1991)
- 1940 – Perle Mesta, later United States ambassador to Luxembourg (1949–1953)
- 1944 – Richard A. Harewood, former state representative from Illinois (1937–1939), later re-elected as state representative (1957–1959)
- 1948 – Robert D. Holmes, later 28th governor of Oregon (1957–1959)
- 1950 – Henry S. Reuss, later U.S. representative from Wisconsin (1955–1983)
- 1951 – James C. Oliver, former U.S. representative from Maine (1937–1943), Democratic nominee for governor of Maine in 1952, later served as U.S. representative from Maine (1959–1961)

==== 1960–1969 ====
- 1960s – Archibald Carey Jr., later mayor of Shreveport, Louisiana
- 1960s – Howard Dean, later lieutenant governor of Vermont (1987–1991), governor of Vermont (1991–2003) and chair of the Democratic National Committee (2005–2009)
- 1960s – Pete Stark, later served as U.S. representative from California (1973–2013)
- 1962 – Don Edwards, later U.S. representative from California (1963–1995)
- 1966 – Jay Rockefeller, later U.S. senator from West Virginia (1985–2015)
- 1968 – Hillary Clinton, later first lady of the United States (1993–2001), U.S. senator from New York (2001–2009), United States secretary of state (2009–2013) and nominee of the Democratic Party for president of the United States in the 2016 election.

==== 1970–1979 ====
- 1970 – William G. Barr, while Illinois state representative
- 1970 – Floyd K. Haskell, later served as U.S. senator from Colorado (1973–1979)
- 1971 – John Lindsay, mayor of New York City, New York, 1972 presidential candidate, and former U.S. representative
- 1971 – Leon Panetta, later served as U.S. representative from California (1977–1993), White House chief of staff (1994–1997), director of the C.I.A. (2009–2011) and U.S. secretary of defense (2011–2013)
- 1972 – Herman Goldner, mayor of St. Petersburg, Florida
- 1972 – Harvey Milk, later a member of the San Francisco Board of Supervisors in California (1978)
- 1972 – Ogden R. Reid, while U.S. representative from New York (1963–1975)
- 1973 – Joan Finney, later Kansas state treasurer (1974–1991) and governor of Kansas (1991–1995)
- 1973 – Edward Meyer, New York state assemblyman
- 1973 – Don Riegle, while U.S. representative from Michigan (1967–1976) and later U.S. senator from Michigan (1976–1995)
- 1976 – James Glisson, Florida state senator
- 1976 – Howard Oda, Hawaii state representative
- 1976 – Edward Zorinsky (1928–1987), while mayor of Omaha, Nebraska, later U.S. senator (1976–1987)
- 1977 – Lloyd H. Kincaid, while Wisconsin state assemblyman
- 1977 – Peter Peyser, U.S. representative from New York (1971–1977 and 1979–1983)
- 1978 – Robert McNamara, U.S. secretary of defense (1961–1968)
- 1978 – John Peavey, Idaho state senator
- 1979 – Charles W. Whalen Jr., former U.S. representative from Ohio (1967–1979)

==== 1980–1989 ====
- 1980 – Thomas M. Foglietta, member of the Philadelphia city council, later served as U.S. representative from Pennsylvania (1981–1997) and United States ambassador to Italy (1997–2001)
- 1985 – Chris Coons, later U.S. senator from Delaware (2010–present)
- 1985 – John Yarmuth, later served as U.S. representative from Kentucky (2007–2023)
- 1987 – Martha Ezzard, while Colorado state senator
- 1988 – Donna Akeda, Hawaii state representative
- 1988 – Ann Kobayashi, Hawaii state senator
- 1988 – Milton Marks, California state senator
- 1988 – Albio Sires, later served as U.S. representative from New Jersey (2006–2023)
- 1988 – Duane Woodard, Colorado attorney general

==== 1990–1999 ====
- 1991 – Markos Moulitsas, later founder of Daily Kos
- 1992 – Mike Doyle, later served as U.S. representative from Pennsylvania (1995–2022)
- 1992 – Frank Pecora, Pennsylvania state senator
- 1992 – Loretta Sanchez, later served as U.S. representative from California (1997–2017)
- 1992 – Mark Takano, later served as U.S. representative from California (2013–present)
- 1994 – Bernard Erickson, Texas state representative
- 1995 – Elizabeth Warren, later served as U.S. senator from Massachusetts (2013–present)
- 1996 – Carolyn McCarthy, later served as U.S. representative from New York (1997–2015)
- 1996 – Ralph Neas, executive director of the Leadership Conference on Civil Rights
- 1996 – Russell W. Peterson, former governor of Delaware (1969–1973)
- 1997 – Debra J. Mazzarelli, New York state assemblywoman
- 1997 – Harley Rouda, later served as U.S. representative for California (2019–2021)
- 1999 – Michael Forbes, while serving as U.S. representative from New York (1995–2001)
- 1999 – Gabrielle Giffords, later U.S. representative from Arizona (2007–2012)

==== 2000–2009 ====
- 2000 – Mark DeSaulnier, Contra Costa County supervisor; later U.S. representative from California (2015–present)
- 2000 – Judi Dutcher, Minnesota state auditor (1995–2003)
- 2000 – Jeff Enfinger, Alabama state senator
- 2000 – Margaret Gamble, South Carolina state representative
- 2000 – Scott Heidepriem, South Dakota state senator
- 2000 – Patrick J. Hogan, Maryland state senator
- 2000 – Dean Elton Johnson, Minnesota state senator
- 2000 – Ed Schultz, broadcaster
- 2000 – Mickey Whatley, South Carolina state representative
- 2001 – Kathy Ashe, Georgia state representative
- 2001 – Charles Wayne Goforth, former Illinois state representative
- 2001 – John A. Lawless, Pennsylvania state representative.
- 2001 – Barbara McIlvaine Smith, Pennsylvania state representative
- 2002 – D. G. Anderson, Hawaii state senator
- 2002 – Charles R. Larson, former superintendent of United States Naval Academy (1983–1986 and 1994–1998)
- 2002 – Ray Nagin, later mayor of New Orleans, Louisiana (2002–2010)
- 2003 – Nancy Boyda, later served as U.S. representative from Kansas (2007–2009)
- 2003 – Corey Corbin, New Hampshire state representative
- 2003 – Michael Decker, North Carolina state representative
- 2003 – Barbara Hafer, state treasurer of Pennsylvania (1997–2005)
- 2003 – Stan Moody, Maine state representative
- 2003 – John E. Moore, later lieutenant governor of Kansas (2003–2007)
- 2003 – Bazy Tankersley, horse breeder, conservationist, and daughter of U.S. senator and publisher Joseph M. McCormick.
- 2004 – Teresa Heinz, philanthropist, widow of U.S. senator John Heinz and current wife of John Kerry
- 2004 – Arthur Mayo, Maine state senator
- 2005 – Steve Lukert, Kansas state representative
- 2005 – Tim Mahoney, later served as U.S. representative for Florida (2007–2009)
- 2005 – Paul J. Morrison, district attorney for Johnson County, Kansas, later Kansas attorney general (2006–2007)
- 2006 – Charles Barkley, basketball player
- 2006 – Wendy Davis, member of the Fort Worth city council, later Texas state senator and 2014 Democratic nominee for governor of Texas
- 2006 – Sam Kitzenberg, Montana state senator.
- 2006 – Cindy Neighbor, Kansas state representative
- 2006 – Mark Parkinson, Kansas state senator, later lieutenant governor of Kansas (2007–2009) and governor of Kansas (2009–2011)
- 2006 – Nancy Riley, Oklahoma state senator
- 2006 – Rodney Tom, Washington state representative
- 2006 – Diana Urban, Connecticut state representative
- 2006 – James Webb, former United States secretary of the Navy (1987–1988), later U.S. senator from Virginia (2007–2013)
- 2006 – Kate Witek, Nebraska state auditor (1999–2007)
- 2007 – Karen Awana, Hawaii state representative
- 2007 – Walter Boasso, Louisiana state senator
- 2007 – Francis Bodine, New Jersey state representative
- 2007 – Janet DiFiore, district attorney of Westchester County, New York
- 2007 – Kirk England, Texas state representative
- 2007 – Paul D. Froehlich, Illinois state representative.
- 2007 – Mike Gabbard, Hawaii state senator
- 2007 – Robert Garcia, later mayor of Long Beach, California
- 2007 – Melvin Henley, Kentucky state representative
- 2007 – Fred Jarrett, Washington state representative
- 2007 – Chris Koster, Missouri state senator, later Missouri attorney general (2009–2017) and 2016 Democratic nominee for governor of Missouri
- 2007 – Pete McCloskey, former U.S. representative from California (1967–1983)
- 2007 – Mike Spano, New York state assemblyman and future mayor of Yonkers
- 2007 – Debbie Stafford, Colorado state representative
- 2008 – Gil Cisneros, later served as U.S. representative for California (2019–2021, 2025–present)
- 2008 – David L. Hogue, Utah state representative
- 2008 – Stacey Plaskett, later served as delegate to the U.S. House of Representatives from the United States Virgin Islands (2015–present)
- 2008 – Bill Walters, former Arkansas state representative
- 2009 – Dale Swenson, Kansas state representative

==== 2010–2019 ====
- 2010 – Steve Fox, California state assemblyman
- 2011 – Wade Hurt, Kentucky state representative
- 2011 – Patrick Murphy, later served as U.S. representative from Florida (2013–2017)
- 2012 – Ron Erhardt, Minnesota state representative
- 2012 – Peter Koo, New York City, New York councilman
- 2012 – Gil Riviere, while Hawaii state representative
- 2013 – Brad Ashford, Nebraska state senator, later U.S. representative from Nebraska (2015–2017)
- 2013 – John Bohlinger, former lieutenant governor of Montana (2005–2013)
- 2013 – Nathan Fletcher, California state assemblyman.
- 2013 – Tom O'Halleran, Arizona state senator, later U.S. representative from Arizona (2017–2023)
- 2013 – Jean Schodorf, Kansas state senator
- 2014 – Aaron Johanson, Hawaii state representative
- 2014 – Sam Satoru Kong, future Hawaii state representative
- 2014 – Ana Rivas Logan, former Florida state senator.
- 2015 – Jane Castor, later mayor of Tampa, Florida (2019–present)
- 2015 – John Ceretto, New York state assemblyman
- 2016 – William Mundell, former Arizona Corporation Commissioner
- 2017 – Beth Fukumoto, Hawaii state representative and Republican minority leader
- 2018 – Barbara Bollier, Kansas state senator
- 2018 – Stephanie Clayton, Kansas state representative
- 2018 – Joy Koesten, Kansas state representative
- 2018 – Richard Painter, chief White House ethics lawyer (2005–2007)
- 2018 – Julia Salazar, New York State Senator from Brooklyn
- 2018 – Steve Schmidt, political strategist and operations chief for John McCain's 2008 presidential campaign, as well as co-founder of The Lincoln Project.
- 2018 – Meagan Simonaire, Maryland state delegate
- 2018 – Dinah Sykes, Kansas state senator
- 2018 – Grant Woods, former attorney general of Arizona (1991–1999)
- 2019 – Dawn Addiego, New Jersey state senator
- 2019 – Wayne Gilchrest, former U.S. representative from Maryland (1991–2009)
- 2019 – Andy McKean, Iowa state representative
- 2019 – Brian Maienschein, California state assemblyman

==== 2020–present ====
- 2020 – Frank Aguilar, member of the Cook County board of commissioners. Previously an Illinois state representative
- 2021 – Joy Hofmeister, Oklahoma Superintendent of Public Instruction (2015–2023) and 2022 Democratic gubernatorial nominee
- 2021 – William Marsh, New Hampshire state representative
- 2021 – Jennifer McCormick, former Indiana Superintendent of Public Instruction (2017–2021)
- 2022 – Jim Leach, former U.S. representative from Iowa (1977–2007)
- 2022 – Kevin Priola, Colorado state senator
- 2023 – Michelle Henry, attorney general of Pennsylvania (2023–2025)
- 2023 – Samuel D. Thompson, New Jersey state senator
- 2025 – Geoff Duncan, former Lieutenant Governor of Georgia (2019–2023)
- 2025 – Cyrus Javadi, Oregon State Representative
- 2025 – Eileen Laubacher, retired United States Navy rear admiral and former U.S. National Security Council director
- 2026 – David Nagel, New Hampshire State Representative (2022–present)
- 2026 – Rick Olson, Minnesota State Senator-elect and former member of the Michigan House of Representatives (2011–2013)

=== Republican to other (third) party ===
- 1870 – Joseph Pulitzer, founder and long-time newspaper publisher of the St. Louis Post-Dispatch and The World, served as a Republican U.S. representative from New York before switching to the Liberal Republican Party for the following four years.
- 1891 – James Weaver, Republican U.S. representative from Iowa turned Greenbacker, later was a founder of the Populist Party and ran for president on that party's ticket in 1892.
- 1893 – William M. Stewart, U.S. senator from Nevada (1864–1875 and 1887–1905) switched to the Silver Party
- 1895 – John P. Jones, U.S. senator from Nevada (1873–1903) switched to Silver Party
- 1896 – Wharton Barker, former Republican activist, switched to the Populist Party and was a presidential candidate in 1900.
- 1896 – Frank J. Cannon, U.S. senator from Utah (1896–1899) switched to Silver Republican Party.
- 1896 – Lee Mantle, U.S. senator from Montana (1895–1899) switched to Silver Republican Party.
- 1896 – Richard F. Pettigrew, U.S. senator from South Dakota (1889–1901) switched to Silver Republican Party.
- 1897 – Fred T. Dubois, U.S. senator from Idaho (1891–1897 and 1901–1907) switched to Silver Republican Party.
- 1897 – Henry M. Teller, U.S. senator from Colorado (1876–1882 and 1885–1909) switched to Silver Republican Party
- 1934 – Robert M. La Follette Jr., U.S. senator from Wisconsin (1925–1947) switched to the Progressive Party.
- 1937 – Vito Marcantonio, U.S. representative from New York (1935–1937 and 1939–1951) switched to the American Labor Party
- 2000 – Rick Jore, Montana state representative to U.S. Constitution Party.
- 2012 – Daniel P. Gordon, Rhode Island state representative joined the Libertarian Party.
- 2012 – Gary Johnson, former governor of New Mexico (1995–2003), switched to the Libertarian Party and became their nominee for president of the United States in both the 2012 election and 2016 election.
- 2012 – Buddy Roemer, former governor of Louisiana (1988–1992), switched to the Reform Party.
- 2014 – Lorence Wenke, former Michigan state Representative, switched to the Libertarian Party.
- 2016 – Mark B. Madsen, Utah state senator, switched to the Libertarian Party.
- 2016 – Mary Matalin, deputy campaign manager for George H. W. Bush's 1992 presidential campaign, switched to Libertarian Party
- 2016 – John Moore, Nevada state assemblyman switched to Libertarian Party
- 2017 – Caleb Dyer, New Hampshire state representative switched to the Libertarian Party
- 2018 – Aubrey Dunn Jr., New Mexico commissioner of public lands switched to the Libertarian Party.
- 2018 – Sam McCann, Illinois state senator switched to the Conservative Party.
- 2022 – Christine Todd Whitman, former governor of New Jersey (1994–2001) and administrator of the Environmental Protection Agency (2001–2003) switched to the Forward Party
- 2023 – Jarrod Sammis, Vermont state representative switched to the Libertarian Party
- 2024 – Charlie Conrad, Oregon state representative switched to the Independent Party of Oregon
- 2025 – Daniel Thatcher, Utah state senator, switched to the Forward Party

=== Republican to independent ===
- 1936 – George William Norris, U.S. senator from Nebraska (1913–1943)
- 1980 – John Anderson, U.S. representative from Illinois (1961–1981) and 1980 independent presidential candidate
- 1990 – Lowell Weicker, former U.S. senator for Connecticut (1971–1989), later independent governor of Connecticut (1991–1995)
- 1994 – Paul Horcher, California state representative
- 2001 – Jim Jeffords, U.S. senator from Vermont (1989–2007)
- 2005 – David Durenberger, former U.S. senator from Minnesota (1979–1995)
- 2005 – Bob Leeper, Kentucky state senator and future county judge/executive of McCracken County. Was previously a Democrat until 1999.
- 2007 – Rick Singleton, Rhode Island state representative
- 2007 – Micheal R. Williams, Tennessee state senator
- 2008 – Ron Erhardt, Minnesota state representative.
- 2008 – Jennifer Siebel Newsom, First Lady of San Francisco and future First Partner of California, was also briefly a member of the American Independent Party by accident
- 2009 – Jim Campbell, Maine state representative
- 2010 – Harri Anne Smith, Alabama state representative
- 2012 – Bruce McPherson, former California Secretary of State and state assemblymember
- 2014 – Larry Pressler, former U.S. senator from South Dakota (1979–1997)
- 2014 – Sue Wagner, former lieutenant governor of Nevada (1991–1995)
- 2014 – Bill Walker, later independent governor of Alaska (2014–2018)
- 2015 – Nate Bell, Arkansas state representative.
- 2016 – Tom Campbell, former U.S. representative from California (1989–2001)
- 2016 – Larry Dunphy, Maine state representative
- 2016 – Gordon J. Humphrey, former U.S. senator from New Hampshire (1979–1990)
- 2016 – Evan McMullin, Republican congressional staff member until July 2016, launched an independent presidential campaign in August 2016
- 2016 – George Will, political commentator
- 2017 – Kevin Battle, Maine state representative
- 2017 – Norm Higgins, Maine state representative
- 2017 – Joe Scarborough, former U.S. representative from Florida (1995–2001) and host of Morning Joe
- 2017 – Chris Vance, former Washington state representative and chair of the Washington Republican Party
- 2017 – Susannah Whipps, Massachusetts state representative
- 2017 – Rick Wilson, political strategist and operations chief for Evan McMullin 2016 presidential campaign, as well as co-founder of The Lincoln Project.
- 2018 – Tani Cantil-Sakauye, chief justice of the California Supreme Court (2011–2023)
- 2018 – Charles Djou, former U.S. representative from Hawaii (2010–2011)
- 2018 – Steve Poizner, former California insurance commissioner (2007–2011)
- 2020 – Paul Mitchell, former U.S. representative from Michigan (2017–2021)
- 2021 – Phelps Anderson, New Mexico state representative
- 2021 – Knute Buehler, former Oregon state senator and Oregon gubernatorial nominee in 2018
- 2021 – Joe Camacho, Northern Mariana Islands territorial representative
- 2021 – Jim Hendren, Arkansas state senator
- 2021 – Jim Nussle, former U.S. representative from Iowa (1991–2007)
- 2022 – Rick Becker, North Dakota state representative
- 2022 – Denver Riggleman, former U.S. representative from Virginia (2019–2021)
- 2023 – Nathan Hochman, former U.S. assistant attorney general
- 2023 – Dan Hynes, New Hampshire state representative
- 2024 – Aidan Ankarberg, New Hampshire state representative
- 2024 – Thomas Manglona, Northern Mariana Islands territorial representative
- 2024 – George Santos, former U.S. representative from New York (2023)
- 2025 – Rick Bennett, Maine state senator
- 2026 – Brenton Awa, Hawaii state senator (2022-2027)
- 2026 – Edward Clere, Indiana state representative
- 2026 – Barbara Ann Fenton-Fung, former Rhode Island state representative (2021–2025)
- 2026 – Allan Fung, former mayor of Cranston (2009–2021) and nominee for governor in 2014 and 2018
- 2026 – John Giles, former mayor of Mesa (2014–2025), and candidate for lieutenant governor in 2026
- 2026 – Kevin Kiley, U.S. Representative from California (2023–present)

== Switches by independents or other parties ==
=== Independent or other party to Democratic ===
- 1874 – Joseph Pulitzer, publisher of The World newspaper switched from the Liberal Republican party to the Democratic party, where he served as a U.S. representative from New York as a Democrat until 1911.
- 1969 – Joe Biden, later member of the New Castle County council from the 4th district (1971–1973), U.S. senator from Delaware (1973–2009), vice president of the United States (2009–2017), president of the United States (2021–2025), was previously registered as an independent
- 1974 – Raúl Grijalva, U.S. representative from Arizona (2003–2025), was previously a member of the Raza Unida Party
- 1990s – Brian Schatz, later state representative (1998–2006), Hawaii Democratic Party chair (2008–2010), lieutenant governor (2010–2012), and U.S. senator (2012–present) from Hawaii. Switched from the Green Party.
- 1996 – Walt Minnick, staff assistant and deputy assistant director for the Office of Management and Budget for Richard Nixon, and 1996 Democratic nominee for U.S. Senate, later U.S. representative from Idaho (2009–2011)
- 2002 – Joe Bertram, later a Hawaii state representative, switched from the Green Party.
- 2004 – Peter Clavelle, while mayor of Burlington left the Vermont Progressive Party.
- 2006 – David Segal, initially elected as a Green to the Providence city council, he joined the Democratic Party to run for the Rhode Island House of Representatives, where he served from 2007 to 2011.
- 2009 – Richard Carroll, Arkansas state representative. At the time of his switch, he was the only Green Party state legislator in the United States.
- 2015 – Ben Chipman, Maine state representative
- 2019 – David Johnson, Iowa state senator after being an independent from 2016 to 2019 and a Republican until then.
- 2020 – Brittney Barreras, New Mexico state representative
- 2022 – Sophia Warren, Maine state representative
- 2023 – Roy Daryl Adams, Louisiana state representative

=== Independent or other party to Republican ===
- 1941 – Henrik Shipstead, while U.S. senator from Minnesota, switched from the Farmer-Labor Party to the Republican Party.
- 2003 – Kelly Ayotte, future New Hampshire Attorney General, U.S. senator from New Hampshire, and governor of New Hampshire
- 2011 – Joel Robideaux, while a Louisiana state representative. He was initially elected as an independent.
- 2012 – Jenna Netherton, South Dakota state representative
- 2014 – Michael Peroutka, member of the Anne Arundel County council and 2022 nominee for Maryland Attorney General, switched from Constitution to Republican
- 2017 – Austin Petersen, writer, commentator, and political candidate, switched from Libertarian Party to Republican
- 2020 – Elon Musk, businessman and political figure
- 2024 – Cara Mund, Miss America 2018, independent candidate for U.S. House in North Dakota 2022, and candidate in Republican primary for U.S. House in 2024

== Multiple party switches ==
=== Democratic to Republican to Democratic ===
- 1854 – Francis Preston Blair, a supporter of presidents Andrew Jackson and Abraham Lincoln who became disillusioned with radical Reconstruction policies
- 1854 – Francis Preston Blair Jr., Democratic nominee for vice president of the United States in 1868. His family had been unwavering supporters of Republican Abraham Lincoln, but he opposed the post-war Reconstruction policy. He had earlier been a friend of Democrat Thomas Hart Benton, and like his father he had also been a member of the Free Soil Party.
- 1854 – Montgomery Blair, postmaster general for President Lincoln. His family left the Democratic Party to join the Republican Party, but he rejoined the Democratic Party after the war.
- 1965 – Arlen Specter, U.S. senator from Pennsylvania (1981–2011). He was a Republican from 1965 to 2009 and a Democrat from 1951 to 1965 and from 2009 until his death in 2012.
- 1995 – Eric Adams, mayor of New York City, New York (2022–2025). Joined the Republican Party in 1995, but returned to the Democratic Party in 2002.
- 2003 – Tommy Dickerson, Mississippi state senator.
- 2003 – Johnny Ford, Alabama state representative.
- 2008 – Jim Bradford, South Dakota state representative.
- 2009 – Parker Griffith, former U.S. representative from Alabama (2009–2011). Joined the Republican Party in 2009, but returned to the Democratic Party in 2014.
- 2012 – Artur Davis, former U.S. representative from Alabama (2003–2011). Joined the Republican Party in 2012, but returned to the Democratic Party in 2015.
- 2015 – Joe Baca, former U.S. representative from California (1999–2013). Joined the Republican Party in 2015, but returned to the Democratic Party in 2018.

=== Democratic to Independent to Democratic ===
- 2021 – Paige Cognetti, mayor of Scranton, Pennsylvania, switched from Democratic Party to independent to run for mayor of Scranton outside of the Democratic primary. She rejoined the party in 2021, and won the Democratic primary that year.
- 2021 – Aaron Coleman, Kansas state representative, switched from Democratic Party to independent before switching back to the Democratic Party.
- 2022 – Ellen Read, New Hampshire state representative, switched from independent to the Democratic Party after having been a Democrat until 2021.
- 2024 – Tony Labranche, former New Hampshire state representative, rejoined the Democratic Party after having been an independent between 2022 and 2024.

=== Republican to Democratic to Republican ===
- 1960 – Jerry Solomon, later U.S. representative from New York (1979–1999). Originally a Republican, he became a Democrat in 1960 and returned to the GOP in 1968.
- 1974 – Matthew G. Martinez, U.S. representative from California (1982–2001). Originally a Republican, he became a Democrat in 1974 and returned to the GOP in 2000 after losing renomination in the Democratic primary.
- 1992 – Evan Jenkins, West Virginia state delegate, later U.S. representative for West Virginia (2015–2019). Originally a Republican, he became a Democrat in 1992. He returned to the GOP in 2013 to mount a campaign for Congress.
- 1997 – Betsy McCaughey, lieutenant governor of New York (1995–1998). Originally a Republican, she became a Democrat in 1997. She returned to the GOP in 2010.
- 2013 – Elbert Guillory, Louisiana state senator (2009–2016). Originally a Republican, Guillory ran for the Louisiana House of Representatives in 2007 as a Democrat, later being elected to the state senate as a Democrat before switching back to Republican in 2013.
- 2017 – Jim Justice, governor of West Virginia (2017–2025), U.S. Senator from West Virginia (2025–present)
- 2018 – Daniel Boman, Alabama state representative

=== Republican to Independent to Republican ===
- 1999 – Bob Smith, U.S. senator from New Hampshire (1990–2003), left the Republican Party on July 13, 1999, while running for the party's presidential nomination; became an independent and declared himself a candidate for the U.S. Taxpayers Party presidential nomination and an independent candidate. On November 1, 1999, he returned to the Republican Party when a Senate committee chairmanship became open.
- 2016 – Blake Filippi, Rhode Island state representative, switched from independent to Republican; he had also been Republican previously until 2012.
- 2024 – Arnold Palacios, Governor of the Northern Mariana Islands, left the Republican Party in 2021 before returning in 2024
- 2024 – Dennis Pyle, Kansas state senator. Left the Republican Party in 2022 to mount an independent campaign for Governor before returning in 2024.

=== Republican to Independent to Democrat ===
- 1952 – Wayne Morse, U.S. senator from Oregon (1945–1969), changed from Republican to independent in 1952 and to Democratic on February 17, 1955
- 1976 – Harold L. Silverman, Maine state representative as a Republican (1973–1976), resigned to become a staffer to independent Governor James B. Longley, Maine state senator as an independent (1979–1980), Democratic nominee for Maine's 2nd congressional district in 1980.
- 2013 – Tracy McCreery, previously a Republican before being elected as a Missouri state representative as an independent. Later ran for re-election as a Democrat in 2013.
- 2004 – Troy Jackson, President of the Maine Senate (2018–2024). First ran for office as a Republican in 2000, elected to Maine House of Representatives in 2002 as an independent, became a Democrat in 2004.
- 2009 – Kinky Friedman, musician, writer, and activist. Originally a Republican, Friedman became an independent in 2004 and mounted an independent campaign for Governor of Texas in 2006. He became a Democrat in 2009.
- 2010 – Charlie Crist, governor of Florida (2007–2011) and U.S. Representative (2017–2022). Originally a Republican, Crist left the party in 2010 and mounted an Independent campaign for U.S. Senate in 2010. He became a Democrat in 2012, and was subsequently elected to congress as a Democrat.
- 2025 – David Jolly, former U.S. representative from Florida (2014–2017), left the Republican Party in 2018 to become an independent, and joined the Democratic Party in 2025.
- 2025 – Joe Walsh, former U.S. representative from Illinois (2011–2013) and candidate in the 2020 Republican presidential primaries, left the Republican Party in 2020 to become an independent, and joined the Democratic Party in 2025.

=== Democrat to Independent to Republican ===
- 1974 – D. French Slaughter Jr., while a Virginia state delegate left the Democratic Party to become an independent. Later a U.S. representative as a Republican (1985–1991).
- 1980 – Charles Evers, civil rights activist, media personality, and former mayor of Fayette, Mississippi, switched from Democratic to independent in 1978 and to Republican in 1980.
- 1994 – Wes Watkins, Democratic U.S. representative from Oklahoma (1977–1991), Democratic (1990) and independent (1994) candidate for governor of Oklahoma and Republican U.S. representative from Oklahoma (1997–2003)
- 2014 – Jay McCallum, Louisiana state representative (1992–2002) and justice of state supreme court (since 2020). Became an independent in 2014, and a Republican in 2020.
- 2021 – Malinda White, while a Louisiana state representative, switched from independent to Republican; she had been a Democrat until 2021.
- 2022 – Kevin Horan, while a Mississippi state representative, switched from independent to Republican. He had been a Democrat until 2020.
- 2024 – Tulsi Gabbard, former representative from Hawaii (2013–2021) and candidate in the 2020 Democratic presidential primaries, left the Democratic Party in 2022, became an independent, and joined the Republican Party in 2024.
- 2026 – John DeBerry, Tennessee state representative (1995–2021), left the Democratic Party in 2020 to become an independent and joined the Republican Party in 2026.
- 2026 – Alan Dershowitz, attorney and law professor

=== Other variations ===
- 1890 – Thomas E. Watson switched to the Populist Party, later U.S. senator for Georgia as a Democrat (1921–1922)
- 1897 – John F. Shafroth, U.S. representative (1895–1904), governor (1909–1913), and U.S. senator from Colorado (1913–1919). First elected as a Republican, became a Silver Republican in 1897, and a Democrat in 1903.
- 1908 – Theodore A. Bell, former U.S. representative from California (1903–1905). He ran in several elections under different parties' banners.
- 1912 – Edward P. Costigan, later a U.S. senator from Colorado (1931–1937). Initially a Republican, launched the Progressive Party of Colorado in 1912, and was elected as a Democrat to the U.S. Senate in 1930.
- 1913 – Miles Poindexter, U.S. senator from Washington (1911–1923) switched to the Progressive Party until rejoining the Republican Party two years later.
- 1920 – Homer Bone, later a Washington state representative (1923–1925), U.S. senator from Washington (1933–1944) and judge of the United States Court of Appeals for the Ninth Circuit (1944–1970). First a member of the Socialist Party, unsuccessfully ran for the U.S. House in 1920 with the Farmer–Labor Party and was elected to the Washington House of Representatives in 1923 with the Farmer-Labor Party, unsuccessfully ran for a U.S. House seat in 1928 as a Republican, and finally registered as a Democrat in 1932 to run for the U.S. Senate.
- 1932 – Henry A. Wallace, United States secretary of agriculture (1933–1940), vice president of the United States (1941–1945), United States secretary of commerce (1945–1946). He was a Republican, then a Democrat (1932–1947), then a Progressive (1947–1953)
- 1936 – Franck R. Havenner, U.S. representative from California (1937–1941; 1945–1953). He was a Republican, then a Progressive endorsed by the Democratic Party (1936–1939), then a Democrat endorsed by Progressives (1939–1941), then a Democrat solely.
- 1986 – Ray Metcalfe, former Alaska state representative (1979–1983) and activist. Republican until 1986, founded the Republican Moderate Party of Alaska that year, and became a Democrat in 2006.
- 1988 – Ron Paul, former U.S. representative from Texas (1976–1977 and 1979–1985), became the Libertarian presidential nominee in 1988; later re-elected as a Republican U.S. representative (1997–2012) and was a Republican presidential candidate in 2008 and 2012.
- 1990 – Steve Beren, political activist from Washington. First a member of the Socialist Workers Party, became a Democrat in 1990, and a Republican in 2004.
- 1990 – Wally Hickel, former U.S. secretary of the interior (1969–1970) left Republican Party before his successful bid for governor of Alaska (1966–1969 and 1990–1994), as nominee of the Alaskan Independence Party. He rejoined the Republican Party in 1994.
- 1995 – Colin Powell, former United States secretary of state under George W. Bush (2001–2005), former chairman of the Joint Chiefs of Staff under George H. W. Bush and Bill Clinton (1989–1993), former national security advisor under Ronald Reagan (1986–1989); switched from independent to Republican in 1995. After supporters of President Donald Trump stormed the U.S. Capitol in January 2021, Powell said that he could no longer call himself a fellow Republican. He switched back to independent.
- 1999 – Joel Giambra, city comptroller of Buffalo, New York (1990–1999), county executive of Erie County, New York (2000–2007). He joined the Republican Party in 1999. In 2018, he joined the Reform Party of New York State to run for governor.
- 1999 – Donald Trump, businessman and real estate developer, later 45th (2017–2021) and 47th (2025–) president of the United States, has been at various times a Republican, Democratic, independent, and Reform Party member.
- 2000 – Virgil Goode, former U.S. representative from Virginia (1997–2009). Initially a Democrat, he sat as an independent and later a Republican during his time in Congress. After Congress, he switched to the Constitution Party and became their nominee for president of the United States in the 2012 election.
- 2001 – Michael Bloomberg, was a Democrat before running for mayor of New York City, New York as a Republican. He later became an independent before rejoining the Democratic Party in 2018 and being a Democratic presidential candidate in 2020.
- 2002 – Sheila Kiscaden, Minnesota state representative elected as a Republican. She joined and won reelection as the Independence Party of Minnesota candidate before accepting an invitation to join the Minnesota Democratic-Farmer-Labor Party in 2006.
- 2004 – Kyrsten Sinema, U.S. senator from Arizona (2019–2025) and former U.S. representative from Arizona (2013–2019), left the Green Party in 2004 to join the Democratic Party, then became an Independent in 2024.
- 2006 – Kari Lake, Republican nominee for governor of Arizona in 2022 and U.S. Senate in 2024, switched from Republican to Independent in 2006, became a Democrat in 2008, and returned to the Republican Party in 2012
- 2007 – Lincoln Chafee, former Independent and Democratic governor of Rhode Island (2011–2015), former Republican U.S. senator for Rhode Island (1999–2007), switched from Republican to Independent in 2007, switched from Independent to Democratic in 2013 while serving as governor of Rhode Island, ran for President in the 2016 Democratic Party presidential primaries, switched to Libertarian Party in 2019
- 2008 – Mike Gravel, former U.S. senator from Alaska (1969–1981) and 2008 presidential candidate switched from Democratic to Libertarian before returning to the Democratic Party in 2010.
- 2008 – Ralph Nader, political activist and perennial presidential candidate, has at times been a member of the Democratic, Green, and Reform parties, and has been an independent since 2008
- 2008 – Matt Gonzalez, former supervisor of the San Francisco Board of Supervisors and independent vice presidential candidate in 2008, has at times been a member of the Democratic, Green and Peace and Freedom Party, and has been an independent since 2008
- 2009 – Jared Kushner, former senior advisor to the President (2017–2021) and director of the Office of American Innovation (2017–2021), has been at various times a Democrat, independent, and Republican.
- 2010 – Chase Oliver, perennial candidate and 2024 Libertarian nominee for president, switched from Democratic to independent in 2009 before joining the Libertarian Party in 2010
- 2010 – Tom Tancredo, former U.S. representative from Colorado (1999–2009), switched to the Constitution Party to run for governor of Colorado, returned to Republican Party in 2011, became an independent in 2015, returned to the Republican Party again in 2017
- 2014 – Robert R. Neall, Maryland state senator and future secretary of the Maryland Department of Health. Originally a Democrat, he became a Republican in 1972 before returning to the Democratic Party in 1999. He left the Democratic Party for the GOP again in 2014.
- 2014 – Carole Keeton Strayhorn, Mayor of Austin (1977–1983), Texas railroad commissioner, (1994–1999), Texas comptroller of public accounts (1999–2007). Originally a Democrat, she became a Republican in 1986 in order to run for congress. She left the GOP in 2006 to mount an independent campaign for Governor of Texas, and rejoined the Democratic Party in 2014. She remained a registered Democrat until her death in 2025.
- 2016 – Michael Bloomberg, Mayor of New York City and candidate in the 2020 Democratic Party presidential primaries was initially a Democrat, became a Republican in 2001, left the GOP to become an independent in 2007, and rejoined the Democratic Party in 2018
- 2016 – Audie Bock, a former California state assemblywoman (1999–2000) initially elected as part of the Green Party, became an independent a few months later, became a Democrat in 2001 after leaving office, and in 2016 became a Republican.
- 2016 – Cynthia Davis, former Missouri state representative, switched from Republican to the Constitution Party in 2011 before switching back in 2016.
- 2016 – Bill Weld, former governor of Massachusetts (1991–1997), switched to the Libertarian Party. Returned to the Republican Party in 2019.
- 2017 – Althea Garrison, member of the Massachusetts House of Representatives (1993–1995) and the Boston City Council (2019–2020), and the first transgender person elected to a state legislature. She has, at various times, been a Republican, a Democrat, and an independent. Her most recent party switch came in 2017, when she switched from the Democratic Party back to being an independent. She served her term in the House of Representatives as a Republican.
- 2019 – John Doll, Kansas state senator, switched back to the Republican Party after becoming an independent in 2018, had previously been a Republican since 2006 and a Democrat before 2006.
- 2019 – S. Marshall Wilson, then a West Virginia state delegate, changed his party affiliation from Republican to independent in 2019, then to the third party America Coming Together in 2022, and then to the Constitution Party in 2023.
- 2020 – Max Abramson, before and while a New Hampshire state representative was a member of multiple parties, including the Republican Party, Libertarian Party, an independent, the Reform Party, the Democratic Party, and the Veterans' Party. He is currently a member of the Republican Party.
- 2020 – Dario Hunter, former member of the Youngstown Board of Education and perennial candidate, was a Democrat before leaving in 2017 to be an independent. Joined the Green Party in 2018 before joining the Oregon Progressive Party in 2020.
- 2021 – Kenneth Mejia, Los Angeles city controller (2022–present) switched from Democratic to Green in 2017 before switching back to the Democratic Party in 2021.
- 2021 – Ervin Yen, former Oklahoma state senator. Initially a Democrat, Yen became a Republican in 2009. He left the GOP to become an independent in 2021.
- 2022 – Rocky Anderson, former Mayor of Salt Lake City and third-party presidential candidate, was a Democrat until founding the Justice Party, returned to the Democratic Party in 2022
- 2022 – John Andrews, while a Maine state representative, switched from Republican to Libertarian before switching back to Republican.
- 2022 – Brandon Phinney, New Hampshire state representative switched to the Libertarian Party before switching back to the Republican Party in 2022.
- 2022 – Miles Taylor, former chief of staff of the United States Department of Homeland Security left the Republican Party to become an independent, then joined the Forward Party.
- 2022 – Fred Thiele, while New York state assemblyman, switched to the Democratic Party from Independence Party of New York after having previously been a member of the Alliance Party and Republican Party
- 2023 – Brian Boquist, while an Oregon state senator, switched from Republican to Independent Party of Oregon before returning to the Republican Party.
- 2023 – Megan Hunt, Nebraska state senator, left the Democratic Party to become an independent, but has previously been a member of the Republican and Libertarian parties.
- 2024 – Justin Amash, U.S. representative from Michigan (2011–2021) and Senate candidate in 2024, left the Republican Party in 2019 to become an independent, joined the Libertarian Party in 2020, then rejoined the Republican Party in 2024.
- 2024 – Laura Ebke, former Nebraska state senator, switched to the Liberal Party USA after having switched to the Libertarian Party in 2017 from the Republican Party.
- 2024 – John Eder, Maine state representative (2003–2007, 2024–present). Initially a member of the Maine Green Independent Party, Eder became a Democrat in 2018 and a Republican in 2024.
- 2025 – Troy Headrick, Vermont state representative (2023–present), left the Vermont Progressive Party to become an independent.
- 2026 – Manny Castro, Northern Mariana Island territorial senator (2025–present), served as an independent as a territorial representative, joined the Democratic Party in 2024 when running for territorial senate, and became a Republican in 2026.
- 2026 – Michael Katz, former Delaware state senator (2009–2013), left the Democratic Party in 2023 to join the Independent Party of Delaware, and joined the Republican Party in 2026 to run for United States Senate.
- 2026 – Bob Krist, former Nebraska state senator (2009–2019), served as a Republican before becoming an independent in 2017, then joined the Democratic Party in 2018, rejoined the Republican Party in 2022, and switched to the America First Party in 2026.
- 2026 – Brett Lindstrom, former Nebraska state senator (2015–2023), and candidate for governor in 2026, left the Republican Party in 2026 to become an indepedent, and within the same year joined the America First Party
- 2026 – Greg Lopez, former U.S. representative from Colorado (2024–2025), left the Democratic Party in 1994 to become a Republican, and left the Republican Party in 2026 to run as an independent for governor of Colorado.

== Within other parties ==
- 2000 – Jesse Ventura, while governor of Minnesota, left the Reform Party, along with most of his supporters, to re-found the Independence Party of Minnesota. Ventura himself would later join the Green Party of Minnesota in 2020.
- 2022 – Luis J. Rodriguez, poet, activist, and perennial candidate, has at times been a member of the Justice Party, Green Party, and Peace and Freedom Party, most recently ran for governor of California as a member of the Green Party

== See also ==
- Flip-flop (politics)
- List of American politicians who switched parties in office
- List of United States representatives who switched parties
- List of United States senators who switched parties
