= List of American politicians who switched parties in office =

The following American politicians switched parties while they were holding elected office.

== Federal ==
=== Senate ===
Name	State	Switch Date	Congress	Old Party	New Party	Notes	Refs
James L. Buckley	New York	1976	94th	Conservative	Republican		
Ben Nighthorse Campbell	Colorado	March 4, 1995	104th	Democratic	Republican		
Reuben Fenton	New York	1872	42nd	Republican	Liberal Republican	The Liberal Republican Party was new and short-lived. Did not seek re-election in the 1874–75 United States Senate elections.	
Reuben Fenton	New York	1873	43rd	Liberal Republican	Republican	The Liberal Republican Party was new and short-lived. Did not seek re-election in the 1874–75 United States Senate elections.	
Jim Jeffords	Vermont	May 24, 2001	107th	Republican	Independent	Caucused with the Democrats after becoming an independent, giving Democrats a majority in the US Senate. His switch became the only time in US history that a party switch resulted in a change of party control of the Senate.	
Robert M. La Follette Jr.	Wisconsin	May 1934	74th	Republican	Wisconsin Progressive	Co-founded the Wisconsin Progressive Party and was re-elected to Senate on that ticket in 1934 and 1940.	
Robert M. La Follette Jr.	Wisconsin	1946	79th	Wisconsin Progressive	Republican	The Wisconsin Progressive Party was dissolved in 1946. Lost re-election to the Senate when defeated by Joseph McCarthy in the Republican primary later that same year.	
Joe Lieberman	Connecticut	2006/2007 (see note)	110th	Democratic	Independent	Lieberman left the Democratic Party after losing the Democratic primary for re-election. Technically, he ran under the party named Connecticut for Lieberman but he himself never officially joined that party. He called himself an Independent Democrat after winning re-election.	
Joe Manchin	West Virginia	May 31, 2024	118th	Democratic	Independent	Manchin continued to caucus with the Democrats.	
Richard Shelby	Alabama	November 9, 1994	103rd	Democratic	Republican	Switch announced the day after the 1994 United States Senate elections, in which Shelby was not up for reelection, but the Republicans gained the majority in the Senate.	
Kyrsten Sinema	Arizona	December 9, 2022	118th	Democratic	Independent	Sinema continued to caucus with the Democrats.	
Bob Smith	New Hampshire	July 1999	106th	Republican	Independent		
Bob Smith	New Hampshire	November 1999	106th	Independent	Republican		
Arlen Specter	Pennsylvania	April 28, 2009	111th	Republican	Democratic		
Strom Thurmond	South Carolina	September 16, 1964	88th	Democratic	Republican		
Lyman Trumbull	Illinois	1871	42nd	Republican	Liberal Republican	The Liberal Republican Party was new and short-lived. Lost re-election in the 1872–73 United States Senate elections to the Republican candidate.	

=== House of Representatives ===
Name	State	District	Switch Date	Congress	Old Party	New Party	Notes	Refs
Rodney Alexander	Louisiana	5th	August 9, 2004	108th	Democratic	Republican		
Justin Amash	Michigan	3rd	July 4, 2019	116th	Republican	Independent	Continued to caucus with the Republicans.	
Justin Amash	Michigan	3rd	May 1, 2020	116th	Independent	Libertarian	Continued to caucus with the Republicans.	
Eugene Atkinson	Pennsylvania	25th	October 14, 1981	97th	Democratic	Republican	Lost re-election in 1982 after being redistricted to the 4th district.	
William Carney	New York	1st	October 7, 1985	99th	Conservative	Republican		
Nathan Deal	Georgia	9th	April 11, 1995	104th	Democratic	Republican		
Jo Ann Emerson	Missouri	8th	January 3, 1997	105th	Republican	Independent	Emerson was re-elected to a full term as an independent to comply with Missouri's electoral law.	
Jo Ann Emerson	Missouri	8th	January 8, 1997	105th	Independent	Republican	Emerson was re-elected to a full term as an independent to comply with Missouri's electoral law.	
Michael Forbes	New York	1st	July 17, 1999	106th	Republican	Democratic		
Virgil Goode	Virginia	5th	January 24, 2000	106th	Democratic	Independent	Caucused with the Republican Party.	
Virgil Goode	Virginia	5th	August 1, 2002	107th	Independent	Republican		
Phil Gramm	Texas	6th	1983	98th	Democratic	Republican	Gramm resigned his seat as a Democrat on January 5, 1983, and then won a special election as a Republican on February 12, 1983.	
Bill Grant	Florida	2nd	February 21, 1989	101st	Democratic	Republican		
Parker Griffith	Alabama	5th	December 22, 2009	111th	Democratic	Republican	Later rejoined the Democratic party.	
Galusha A. Grow	Pennsylvania	14th	1856	34th	Democratic	Republican		
Ralph Hall	Texas	4th	January 3, 2004	108th	Democratic	Republican		
Jimmy Hayes	Louisiana	7th	December 1, 1995	104th	Democratic	Republican		
Andy Ireland	Florida	10th	July 5, 1984	98th	Democratic	Republican	Announced switch on March 17, 1984, but didn't officially switch until July 5 in order to keep his committee assignments for as long as possible.	
John Jarman	Oklahoma	5th	January 24, 1975	94th	Democratic	Republican		
Kevin Kiley	California	3rd	March 9, 2026	119th	Republican	Independent	Continued to caucus with the Republicans.	
Greg Laughlin	Texas	14th	June 26, 1995	104th	Democratic	Republican		
Matthew G. Martínez	California	31st	July 27, 2000	106th	Democratic	Republican	Switched parties after losing the Democratic primary for re-election	
Paul Mitchell	Michigan	10th	December 14, 2020	116th	Republican	Independent	Switched parties during the lame duck session, three weeks before his retirement.	
Michael Parker	Mississippi	4th	November 10, 1995	104th	Democratic	Republican		
Ogden Reid	New York	26th	March 22, 1972	92nd	Republican	Democratic		
Donald Riegle	Michigan	7th	1973	93rd	Republican	Democratic		
Tommy F. Robinson	Arkansas	2nd	July 28, 1989	101st	Democratic	Republican		
Franklin D. Roosevelt Jr.	New York	20th	January 3, 1951	82nd	Liberal	Democratic	Roosevelt was re-elected as a Democrat.	
Bob Stump	Arizona	3rd	September 24, 1981	98th	Democratic	Republican	Did not officially change party until the 1982 election for a term beginning January 3, 1983.	
Billy Tauzin	Louisiana	3rd	August 8, 1995	104th	Democratic	Republican		
Jeff Van Drew	New Jersey	2nd	January 7, 2020	116th	Democratic	Republican		
Albert Watson	South Carolina	2nd	1965	90th	Democratic	Republican	Watson resigned his seat as a Democrat on February 1, 1965, and then won a special election as a Republican on June 15, 1965.	
Hendrick B. Wright	Pennsylvania	12th	1879	46th	Democratic	Greenback		

== State ==
Name	State	Office	Switch Date	Old Party	New Party	Notes	Refs
Max Abramson	New Hampshire	Member of the New Hampshire House of Representatives	May 2016	Republican	Libertarian	Left office to run for Governor of New Hampshire in 2016 as a Libertarian. Was re-elected to the New Hampshire House in 2018 as a Republican.	
Max Abramson	New Hampshire	Member of the New Hampshire House of Representatives	June 28, 2019	Republican	Independent	Became an independent as he campaigned to be the nominee for President of the United States in 2020 of the Libertarian Party, the Veterans Party, and the Reform Party. Was elected to a seat in a different district in the New Hampshire House in 2020 as a Republican.	
Roy Daryl Adams	Louisiana	Member of the Louisiana House of Representatives	April 27, 2023	Independent	Democratic		
Dawn Addiego	New Jersey	Member of the New Jersey Senate	January 28, 2019	Republican	Democratic		
Robert Adley	Louisiana	Member of the Louisiana Senate	December 10, 2007	Democratic	Republican	Switched parties after the 2007 Louisiana elections to align with incoming governor Bobby Jindal.	
Marie Alvarado-Gil	California	Member of the California Senate	August 8, 2024	Democratic	Republican		
Scott Angelle	Louisiana	Lieutenant Governor of Louisiana	October 26, 2010	Democratic	Republican	Appointed by Republican Bobby Jindal to serve until the conclusion of the 2010 special election to replace Mitch Landrieu, who had been elected Mayor of New Orleans. Previously served as Louisiana Secretary of Natural Resources, appointed by Democrat Kathleen Blanco. Re-appointed by Jindal to that position following the election.	
Aidan Ankarberg	New Hampshire	Member of the New Hampshire House of Representatives	November 20, 2024	Republican	Independent		
Bill Archer	Texas	Member of the Texas House of Representatives	December 7, 1967	Democratic	Republican		
Brenton Awa	Hawaii	Member of the Hawaii Senate	November 9, 2026	Republican	Independent		
Karen Awana	Hawaii	Member of the Hawaii House of Representatives	December 19, 2007	Republican	Democratic		
Richard Baker	Louisiana	Member of the Louisiana House of Representatives	May 31, 1985	Democratic	Republican		
Thomas Baker	Alaska	Member of the Alaska House of Representatives	May 16, 2024	Republican	Independent	Appointed and served as a Republican, but ran for reelection as an independent.	
Robert Barham	Louisiana	Member of the Louisiana Senate	February 9, 2001	Democratic	Republican	Announced after a visit to the White House following an invitation from President George W. Bush.	
Taylor Barras	Louisiana	Member of the Louisiana House of Representatives	August 12, 2011	Democratic	Republican		
Eli Bebout	Wyoming	Member of the Wyoming House of Representatives	April 26, 1994	Democratic	Republican		
Walter Boasso	Louisiana	Member of the Louisiana Senate	April 26, 2007	Republican	Democratic		
Audie Bock	California	Member of the California Assembly	1999	Green	No party preference		
Barbara Bollier	Kansas	Member of the Kansas Senate	December 12, 2018	Republican	Democratic		
Mike Bowers	Georgia	Attorney General of Georgia	1994	Democratic	Republican		
Michael Don Brandenburg	North Dakota	Member of the North Dakota House of Representatives	October 2, 1994	Democratic	Republican		
Nickey Browning	Mississippi	Member of the Mississippi Senate	March 27, 2013	Democratic	Republican		
Buddy Caldwell	Louisiana	Attorney General of Louisiana	2011	Democratic	Republican		
Sonny Callahan	Alabama	Member of the Alabama Senate	January 30, 1984	Democratic	Republican		
Charles T. Canady	Florida	Member of the Florida House of Representatives	June 1999	Democratic	Republican		
Videt Carmichael	Mississippi	Member of the Mississippi Senate	May 2002	Democratic	Republican		
Hillary Cassel	Florida	Member of the Florida House of Representatives	December 27, 2024	Democratic	Republican		
Lincoln Chafee	Rhode Island	Governor of Rhode Island	May 30, 2013	Independent	Democratic	Previously served in the U.S. Senate (1999–2007) as a Republican before becoming an independent.	
Stephanie Clayton	Kansas	Member of the Kansas House of Representatives	December 19, 2018	Republican	Democratic		
Edward Clere	Indiana	Member of the Indiana House of Representatives	January 30, 2026	Republican	Independent		
Elle Cochran	Hawaii	Member of the Hawaii House of Representatives	March 16, 2026	Democratic	Republican		
Matthew Coker	New Hampshire	Member of the New Hampshire House of Representatives	February 8, 2024	Democratic	Republican		
Linda Collins	Arkansas	Member of the Arkansas House of Representatives	August 2011	Democratic	Republican		
Charlie Conrad	Oregon	Member of the Oregon House of Representatives	June 20, 2024	Republican	Independent Party of Oregon	Switched parties after losing renomination over his vote to protect access to abortion and gender-affirming care.	
Tricia Cotham	North Carolina	Member of the North Carolina House of Representatives	April 5, 2023	Democratic	Republican	Switched parties after receiving backlash for missing a vote on an assault weapons ban.	
Charlie Crist	Florida	Governor of Florida	May 13, 2010	Republican	Independent	Later elected to congress as a Democrat.	
William Daniel	Louisiana	Member of the Louisiana House of Representatives	2005	Democratic	Republican		
Gilbert DiNello	Michigan	Member of the Michigan Senate	1992	Democratic	Republican		
Hunt Downer	Louisiana	Member of the Louisiana House of Representatives	February 9, 2001	Democratic	Republican	Announced after a visit to the White House following an invitation from President George W. Bush.	
Aubrey Dunn Jr.	New Mexico	Land Commissioner of New Mexico	January 2018	Republican	Libertarian		
Noble Ellington	Louisiana	Member of the Louisiana House of Representatives	2010	Democratic	Republican		
Kirk England	Texas	Member of the Texas House of Representatives	September 20, 2007	Republican	Democratic		
Bernard Erickson	Texas	Member of the Texas House of Representatives	December 31, 1993	Republican	Democratic		
Ryan Ferns	West Virginia	Member of the West Virginia House of Delegates	November 2013	Democratic	Republican		
Shaun Filiault	New Hampshire	Member of the New Hampshire House of Representatives	June 7, 2023	Democratic	Independent		
Beth Fukumoto	Hawaii	Member of the Hawaii House of Representatives	2017	Republican	Democratic		
Mike Gabbard	Hawaii	Member of the Hawaii Senate	August 30, 2007	Republican	Democratic		
Avel Gordly	Oregon	Member of the Oregon Senate	2006	Democratic	Independent		
Sherry Gould	New Hampshire	Member of the New Hampshire House of Representatives	May 2024	Democratic	Republican		
Mark Grisanti	New York	Member of the New York Senate	2011	Democratic	Republican		
Henry Grover	Texas	Member of the Texas House of Representatives	February 3, 1966	Democratic	Republican		
Elbert Guillory	Louisiana	Member of the Louisiana Senate	May 31, 2013	Democratic	Republican		
Ryan Guillen	Texas	Member of the Texas House of Representatives	November 15, 2021	Democratic	Republican	Was one of the "Killer Ds" during the 2003 Texas redistricting	
Barbara Hafer	Pennsylvania	Treasurer of Pennsylvania	2003	Republican	Democratic		
Bob Hanner	Georgia	Member of the Georgia House of Representatives	2010	Democratic	Republican		
Jim Hendren	Arkansas	Member of the Arkansas Senate	February 18, 2021	Republican	Independent	Left the Republican Party following the January 6, 2021, U.S. Capitol attack.	
Michelle Henry	Pennsylvania	Attorney General of Pennsylvania	March 2023	Republican	Democratic	Joined the Democratic Party after succeeding Josh Shapiro as Attorney General.	
Joy Hofmeister	Oklahoma	Superintendent of Oklahoma	October 7, 2021	Republican	Democratic	Switched after announcing her intention to challenge to Republican Governor Kevin Stitt in the 2022 election.	
Chuck Hopson	Texas	Member of the Texas House of Representatives	November 6, 2009	Democratic	Republican		
Eric Hutchings	Utah	Member of the Utah House of Representatives	2001	Democratic	Republican		
Cindy Hyde-Smith	Mississippi	Member of the Mississippi Senate	December 28, 2010	Democratic	Republican	Later appointed and elected to the U.S. Senate as a Republican.	
Dan Hynes	New Hampshire	Member of the New Hampshire House of Representatives	June 13, 2023	Republican	Independent		
Virginia Isbell	Hawaii	Member of the Hawaii House of Representatives	December 23, 1987	Republican	Democratic		
Mike Jacobs	Georgia	Member of the Georgia House of Representatives	June 19, 2007	Democratic	Republican		
Glenn Jeffries	West Virginia	Member of the West Virginia Senate	December 1, 2022	Democratic	Republican		
Evan Jenkins	West Virginia	Member of the West Virginia Senate	July 2013	Democratic	Republican		
Woody Jenkins	Louisiana	Member of the Louisiana House of Representatives	1994	Democratic	Republican		
Aaron Ling Johanson	Hawaii	Member of the Hawaii House of Representatives	December 29, 2014	Republican	Democratic		
Dean Johnson	Minnesota	Member of the Minnesota Senate	2000	Republican	DFL		
Jim Justice	West Virginia	Governor of West Virginia	2017	Democratic	Republican	Justice had previously been a Republican until switching to the Democratic Party in 2015 to run for Governor of West Virginia.	
John Kennedy	Louisiana	Treasurer of Louisiana	August 27, 2007	Democratic	Republican	Later elected to the U.S. Senate as a Republican.	
Bob Krist	Nebraska	Member of the Nebraska Legislature	February 2018	Republican	Democratic		
Ann Kobayashi	Hawaii	Member of the Hawaii Senate	July 1988	Republican	Democratic		
Jeremy LaCombe	Louisiana	Member of the Louisiana House of Representatives	April 10, 2023	Democratic	Republican		
Jack Larsen	Hawaii	Member of the Hawaii House of Representatives	January 18, 1977	Republican	Democratic		
Steve Lebsock	Colorado	Member of the Colorado House of Representatives	March 2, 2018	Democratic	Republican	Changed party affiliation prior to expulsion from the Colorado House of Representatives due to allegations of sexual harassment.	
Jan Lee	Oregon	Member of the Oregon House of Representatives	June 2001	Republican	Independent		
Jan Lee	Oregon	Member of the Oregon House of Representatives	2001	Independent	Democratic		
José Manuel Lozano	Texas	Member of the Texas House of Representatives	March 8, 2012	Democratic	Republican		
Mesha Mainor	Georgia	Member of the Georgia House of Representatives	July 11, 2023	Democratic	Republican	Switched parties after receiving backlash for being the only Democrat to vote for a school voucher bill.	
Nasif Majeed	North Carolina	Member of the North Carolina House of Representatives	April 27, 2026	Democratic	Independent	Switched parties after losing the Democratic primary	
Kevin Mannix	Oregon	Member of the Oregon House of Representatives	1997	Democratic	Republican		
Chad Mayes	California	Member of the California Assembly	December 2, 2019	Republican	Independent		
Mike McDonnell	Nebraska	Member of the Nebraska Legislature	April 3, 2024	Democratic	Republican	Switched parties after being censured by the Nebraska Democratic Party for voting against abortion rights.	
Andy McKean	Iowa	Member of the Iowa House of Representatives	April 2019	Republican	Democratic		
Stanford Morse	Mississippi	Member of the Mississippi Senate	March 27, 1963	Democratic	Republican		
Robert R. Neall	Maryland	Member of the Maryland Senate	November 12, 1999	Republican	Democratic	Later re-joined the Republican Party.	
Howard Oda	Hawaii	Member of the Hawaii House of Representatives	November 7, 1975	Republican	Democratic		
Marshall Parker	South Carolina	Member of the South Carolina Senate	March 9, 1966	Democratic	Republican		
Aaron Peña	Texas	Member of the Texas House of Representatives	December 14, 2010	Democratic	Republican		
Sonny Perdue	Georgia	Member of the Georgia Senate	1998	Democratic	Republican	Later elected Governor of Georgia.	
Maria Perez	New Hampshire	Member of the New Hampshire House of Representatives	October 2, 2023	Democratic	Independent		
Rick Perry	Texas	Member of the Texas House of Representatives	September 29, 1989	Democratic	Republican	Later elected Governor of Texas.	
Rupie Phillips	West Virginia	Member of the West Virginia House of Delegates	January 26, 2017	Democratic	Republican		
Jason Pizzo	Florida	Member of the Florida Senate	April 24, 2025	Democratic	Independent	Switched to independent, which in turn forfeited his position as Minority Leader for the Florida Democratic Party	
Peri Pourier	South Dakota	Member of the South Dakota House of Representatives	September 23, 2025	Democratic	Republican		
Kevin Priola	Colorado	Member of the Colorado Senate	August 22, 2022	Republican	Democratic	Switched parties after expressing concern about the Republican embrace of 2020 election conspiracies.	
Elliott Pritt	West Virginia	Member of the West Virginia House of Delegates	April 17, 2023	Democratic	Republican		
Allan Ritter	Texas	Member of the Texas House of Representatives	December 14, 2010	Democratic	Republican		
Joel Robideaux	Louisiana	Member of the Louisiana House of Representatives	2011	Independent	Republican		
Shane Robinson	Maryland	Member of the Maryland House of Delegates	November 21, 2018	Democratic	Green		
Sal Rocca	Michigan	Member of the Michigan House of Representatives	1992	Democratic	Republican		
Buddy Roemer	Louisiana	Governor of Louisiana	March 1991	Democratic	Republican		
Thomas M. Salmon	Vermont	Auditor of Vermont	2009	Democratic	Republican		
Jarrod Sammis	Vermont	Member of the Vermont House of Representatives	May 3, 2023	Republican	Libertarian		
Meagan C. Simonaire	Maryland	Member of the Maryland House of Delegates	October 15, 2018	Republican	Democratic		
J. Roland Smith	South Carolina	Member of the South Carolina House of Representatives	August 18, 1993	Democratic	Republican		
Mike Spano	New York	Member of the New York Assembly	2007	Republican	Democratic		
Floyd Spence	South Carolina	Member of the South Carolina House of Representatives	April 14, 1962	Democratic	Republican		
Chris Steineger	Kansas	Member of the Kansas Senate	2010	Democratic	Republican		
Dale Swenson	Kansas	Member of the Kansas House of Representatives	2008	Republican	Democratic		
Dinah Sykes	Kansas	Member of the Kansas Senate	December 2018	Republican	Democratic		
Johnny Tadlock	Oklahoma	Member of the Oklahoma House of Representatives	2018	Democratic	Republican		
Daniel Thatcher	Utah	Member of the Utah Senate	March 7, 2025	Republican	Forward		
Shawn Thierry	Texas	Member of the Texas House of Representatives	August 30, 2024	Democratic	Republican		
Francis C. Thompson	Louisiana	Member of the Louisiana House of Representatives	March 17, 2023	Democratic	Republican		
Samuel D. Thompson	New Jersey	Member of the New Jersey Senate	February 13, 2023	Republican	Democratic	Switched parties after Republicans supported his primary challenger.	
Gray Tollison	Mississippi	Member of the Mississippi Senate	November 11, 2011	Democratic	Republican		
Amy Tuck	Mississippi	Lieutenant Governor of Mississippi	2002	Democratic	Republican		
Susan Valdes	Florida	Member of the Florida House of Representatives	December 10, 2024	Democratic	Republican		
Wanda Vázquez Garced	Puerto Rico	Governor of Puerto Rico	2019	Democratic	Republican		
Jesse Ventura	Minnesota	Governor of Minnesota	2000	Reform	Independence		
Christine Watkins	Utah	Member of the Utah House of Representatives	December 2012	Democratic	Republican		
Robin L. Webb	Kentucky	Member of the Kentucky Senate	May 30, 2025	Democratic	Republican		
Kent Williams	Tennessee	Member of the Tennessee House of Representatives	February 9, 2009	Republican	Independent	Expelled by Tennessee Republican Party.	
Kate Witek	Nebraska	Auditor of Nebraska	August 2006	Republican	Democratic		
Ernest Wooton	Louisiana	Member of the Louisiana House of Representatives	2005	Democratic	Republican		

== Local ==
Name	State	Office	Switch Date	Congress	Old Party	New Party	Notes	Refs
Michael Bloomberg	New York	Mayor of New York City	2007	Republican	Independent	Later ran for president in the 2020 presidential election as a Democrat.		
Norm Coleman	Minnesota	Mayor of St. Paul	1996	DFL	Republican			
Kim Davis	Kentucky	Rowan County Clerk	2015	Democratic	Republican			
Mike Duggan	Michigan	Mayor of Detroit	December 2024	Democratic	Independent			
Matt Gonzalez	California	Member of the San Francisco Board of Supervisors	November 2000	Democratic	Green			
Eric Johnson	Texas	Mayor of Dallas	September 22, 2023	Democratic	Republican			
Ari Kagan	New York	Member of the New York City Council	November 2022	Democratic	Republican	Cited the city's criminal reforms and rising crime as the main reasons he was switching parties.		
John Lindsay	New York	Mayor of New York City	1971	Republican	Democratic			
Bob Martinez	Florida	Mayor of Tampa	1983	Democratic	Republican			
Kymberly Pine	Hawaii	Member of the Honolulu City Council	November 9, 2016	Republican	Democratic			
Rick Sheehy	Nebraska	Mayor of Hastings	2003	Democratic	Republican			
David Tubiolo	New York	Member of the Westchester County Board of Legislators	February 7, 2020	Republican	Democratic			

== See also ==
- List of Canadian politicians who have crossed the floor
- List of elected British politicians who have changed party affiliation
- List of party switchers in the United States
- List of United States representatives who switched parties
- List of United States senators who switched parties
- Party switching in the United States
- Waka-jumping
