= WMER =

- Meridian, Mississippi; United States
- Broadcast area: Meridian, Mississippi
- Frequency: 1390 kHz

Programming
- Format: Gospel music

Ownership
- Owner: N. Brad Carter, Jr.

Technical information
- Licensing authority: FCC
- Facility ID: 48542
- Class: D
- Power: 5,000 watts (day); 101 watts (night)
- Transmitter coordinates: 32°20′41″N 88°41′32″W

Links
- Public license information: Public file; LMS
- Website: wmerworldwide.com

WMER (1390 AM) is a Gospel radio station broadcasting in the Meridian, Mississippi, Arbitron market.

== History ==
WMER was owned by former Mississippi State Senator Brad Carter, who died on July 1, 2024.

== Translator ==
WMER is also heard on 93.1 FM, through a translator in Meridian, Mississippi.

Call sign	Frequency	City of license	FID	ERP (W)	HAAT	Class	FCC info
W226BI	93.1 FM	Meridian, Mississippi	144484	75	183.8 m (603 ft)	D	LMS
