= James A. Haley =

American politician

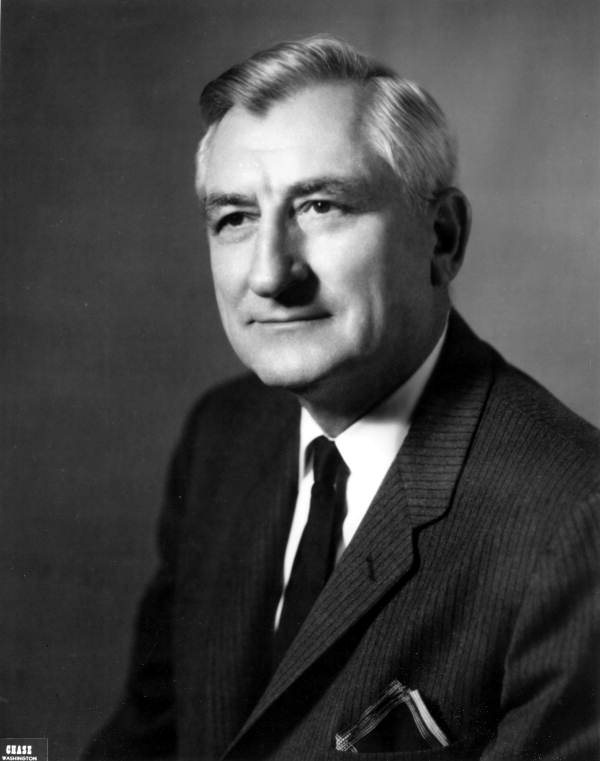
- Portrait of Haley, 1964

Member of the U.S. House of Representatives from Florida
- In office January 3, 1953 – January 3, 1977
- Preceded by: district created
- Succeeded by: Andy Ireland
- Constituency: 7th district (1953–1973); 8th district (1973–1977)

Member of the Florida House of Representatives from Sarasota County
- In office 1949–1953
- Preceded by: John R. Peacock
- Succeeded by: Henry S. Bartholomew

Personal details
- Born: James Andrew Haley; January 4, 1899 Jacksonville, Alabama, U.S.
- Died: August 6, 1981 (aged 82) Sarasota, Florida, U.S.
- Resting place: Boca Raton Cemetery in Boca Raton
- Party: Democratic
- Spouse: Aubrey Barlow Black Ringling (m. 1942; died 1976)
- Occupation: Businessman; politician

Military service
- Branch/service: United States Army
- Unit: Troop A, 2nd Cavalry Regiment
- Battles/wars: World War I; European theater; Western Front

James Andrew Haley (January 4, 1899 – August 6, 1981) was an American World War I veteran who served 12 terms as a U.S. representative from Florida from 1953 to 1977.

== Biography ==
Born in Jacksonville, Alabama, Haley attended the public schools and the University of Alabama.

=== World War I ===
During World War I, Haley enlisted in the United States Army serving with Troop A, Second Cavalry where he saw combat in France, in April 1917 and served overseas.

=== Ringling executive ===
He was an accountant in Sarasota, Florida, from 1920 to 1933. He served as general manager of John Ringling estate 1933–1943.

On December 4, 1942, Haley married Aubrey Ringling (née Aubrey Barlow Black), the widow of Richard T. Ringling who had died in 1931. Richard Ringling was the son of Alf T. Ringling one of the original Ringling brothers.

From 1943 to 1945, he was the first vice president of Ringling Circus and president and director of Ringling Bros. and Barnum & Bailey. In 1944, a fire broke out at a Ringling Circus show in Hartford, Connecticut that killed 169 people. On the day of the fire, Haley was the highest ranking executive traveling with the circus. During the subsequent trial, he and five other circus officials pleaded no contest to charges of involuntary manslaughter and were sentenced to prison. Haley served eight months and in 1945 was returned to Florida, where he received a pardon from Governor Millard F. Caldwell.

Haley worked for Ringling Bros. and Barnum & Bailey from 1946 to 1948.

He later engaged in newspaper publishing and later in general printing business.

=== Early political career ===
He served as chairman of the Democratic executive committee of Sarasota County 1935–1952. He served as member of the Florida House of Representatives from 1949 to 1952. He was a delegate to the 1952, 1956, and 1960 Democratic National Conventions.

=== Congress ===
Haley was elected as a Democrat to the Eighty-third and to the eleven succeeding Congresses (January 3, 1953 – January 3, 1977), during which time he was a signatory to the 1956 Southern Manifesto that opposed the desegregation of public schools ordered by the Supreme Court in Brown v. Board of Education. He served as chairman of the Committee on Interior and Insular Affairs (Ninety-third and Ninety-fourth Congresses).

Haley was not a candidate for reelection to the Ninety-fifth Congress in 1976.

=== Death and burial ===
Haley died in Sarasota on August 6, 1981, and was interred in Boca Raton Cemetery in Boca Raton.

== Legacy ==
The United States Department of Veterans Affairs located in Tampa is named James A. Haley VA Medical Center after him.

U.S. House of Representatives
Preceded by District created	Member of the U.S. House of Representatives from Florida's 7th congressional district 1953–1973	Succeeded by Sam Gibbons
Preceded by Bill Young	Member of the U.S. House of Representatives from Florida's 8th congressional district 1973–1977	Succeeded by Andy Ireland
Political offices
Preceded by Wayne N. Aspinall; Colorado	Chairman of House Interior and Insular Affairs Committee; 1973–1977	Succeeded by Mo Udall; Arizona
