= Brad Carter (politician) =

American politician and engineer (1936–2024)

Member of the Mississippi State Senate from the 33rd district
- In office January 2, 1996 – January 4, 2000
- Preceded by: Joe Clay Hamilton
- Succeeded by: Videt Carmichael

Personal details
- Born: December 7, 1936
- Died: July 1, 2024 (aged 87) Meridian, Mississippi, U.S.
- Party: Republican ?
- Education: University of Tennessee
- Occupation: Civil engineer Structural engineer Broadcaster

Nathan Bradford Carter Jr. (December 7, 1936 – July 1, 2024) was an American politician, civil and structural engineer, and radio station owner. Carter served in the Mississippi State Senate from 1996 to 2000, representing Senate District 33. He also owned and operated WMER, a Christian Gospel music radio station headquartered in Meridian, Mississippi. Additionally, Carter served as a former member of the Meridian Public School District school board and founded an architectural engineering company, Carter Engineering.

Carter died at Ochsner Rush Specialty Hospital in Meridian, Mississippi, on July 1, 2024, at the age of 87.
