= Jack Larsen (politician) =

American politician

Member of the Hawaii House of Representatives
- In office 1974–1980

Personal details
- Born: May 30, 1924 Honolulu, Hawaii, U.S.
- Died: August 16, 2015 (aged 91) Carmel, California, U.S.
- Party: Democratic
- Other political affiliations: Republican (before 1977)
- Education: University of Hawaiʻi at Mānoa; Colgate University

Jack Lucas Larsen (May 30, 1924 – August 16, 2015) was an American politician. He served as a member of the Hawaii House of Representatives.

== Life and career ==
Larsen was born in Honolulu, Hawaii. He graduated from Culver Military Academy in Culver, Indiana in 1943. He served in the United States Army Air Forces in World War II. He then attended the University of Hawaiʻi at Mānoa for two years from 1946 to 1950 and graduated from Colgate University in 1950.

Larsen worked many years for Dole Food. He served in the Hawaii House of Representatives from 1974 to 1980, having been elected twice as a Republican and once as a Democrat. Larsen switched parties in 1977 because "his ideas as a Republican were ignored in the Democratic-dominated Legislature."

Larsen died in Carmel, CA on August 26, 2015.

== See also ==
- List of American politicians who switched parties in office
