= Jeff Tate (politician) =

American politician

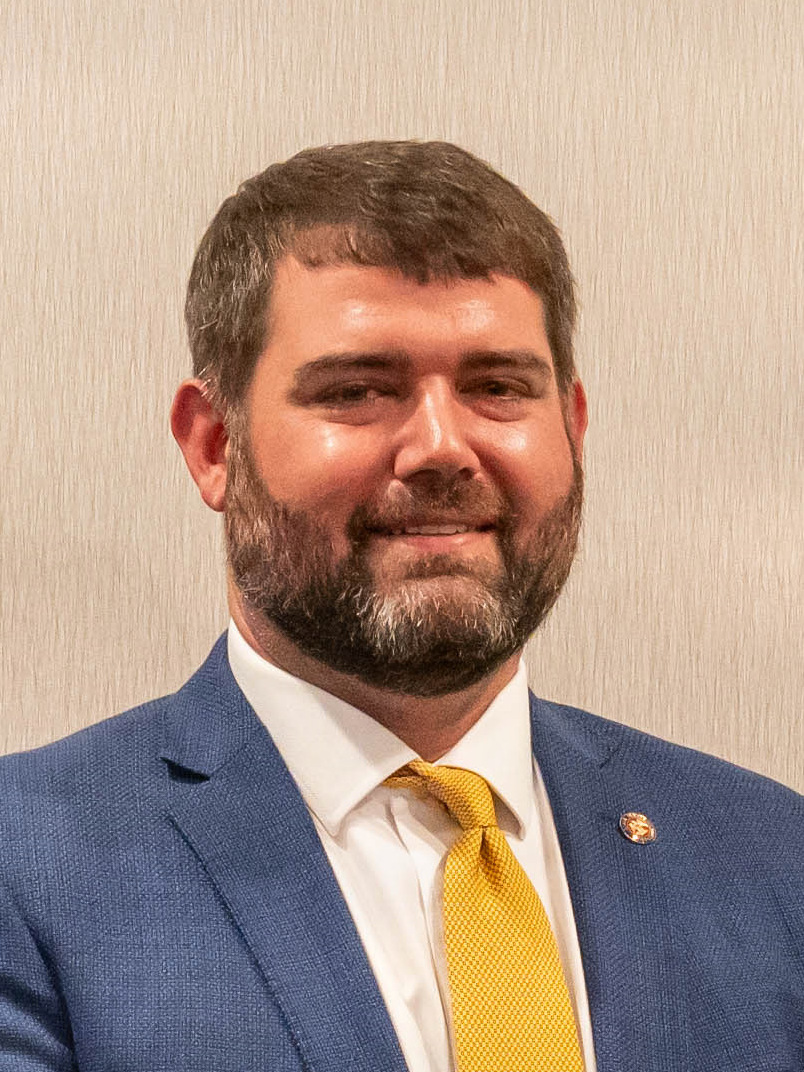
- Tate in 2026

Member of the Mississippi Senate from the 33rd district
- Incumbent
- Assumed office January 7, 2020
- Preceded by: Videt Carmichael

Election Commissioner Lauderdale County, MS
- In office 2009–2019

Personal details
- Born: April 22, 1988 (age 38) Meridian, Mississippi, U.S.
- Party: Republican
- Spouse: Leigha Tate

Jeff Tate (born April 22, 1988) is an American politician. He is a Republican who represents District 33 (Clarke and Lauderdale counties) in the Mississippi State Senate.

== Political career ==
Tate served as an Election Commissioner in Lauderdale County, Mississippi from 2009 to 2019.

In 2019, Tate ran for election to the 33rd district's seat in the Mississippi State Senate; former Senator Videt Carmichael had decided not to seek re-election. Tate defeated Erie Johnston in the Republican primary with 83.9% of the vote, and was unopposed in the general election.

=== Committee assignments ===
Tate serves on the following Senate committees:

- Elections (chair)
- Appropriations
- County Affairs
- Environment Protection, Conservation and Water Resources
- Forestry
- Labor
- Local and Private
- Technology
