= Leslie Osterman =

American politician (1947–2021)

Leslie G. Osterman

Member of the Kansas House of Representatives from the 97th district
- In office January 10, 2011 – January 14, 2019
- Preceded by: Dale Swenson
- Succeeded by: Nick Hoheisel

Personal details
- Born: July 29, 1947 Cheyenne, Wyoming, U.S.
- Died: February 18, 2021 (aged 73) Wichita, Kansas, U.S.
- Party: Republican
- Spouse: Deloris D. Osterman (died 2003)
- Children: 1
- Education: George Washington University

Military service
- Allegiance: United States Army
- Branch/service: United States Navy
- Unit: 3rd Marine Division
- Battles/wars: Vietnam War

Leslie Gene Osterman (July 29, 1947 – February 18, 2021) was a health systems analyst from Wichita, Kansas, who was a Republican member of the Kansas House of Representatives from District 97 in southwestern Wichita County. First elected on November 2, 2010, Osterman lost races for the same seat in 2000 and 2008, when he ran each time as a Democrat.

Having switched parties, new Republican Osterman in 2010 unseated the veteran Democratic Representative Dale Swenson, 2,341 (53.8 percent) to 2,007 (46.2 percent). According to Osterman's website, Swenson supported an 18 percent increase in state taxes and a 10 percent hike in the Kansas state budget. Swenson (born c. 1957) opposed the filing of legal challenges to the Patient Protection and Affordable Care Act signed into law in 2010 by U.S. President Barack Obama.

== Early life and education ==
Osterman was born in Cheyenne, Wyoming, to Albert Osterman, Jr. (1923–2011), and the late Edith L. Osterman. His father was a World War II veteran, a municipal employee in Cheyenne, and also worked for several construction companies in Wyoming and Colorado. Osterman graduated in 1966 from Cheyenne Central High School.

== Career ==
Osterman served in the United States Navy and was wounded in the Vietnam War. He retired at the rank of chief petty officer. In 1991, he received a Bachelor of Science degree in health science and hospital management from George Washington University in Washington, D.C. He did not locate to Kansas until 1986. From 1993 until his retirement, he was affiliated with Preferred Health Systems in Wichita.

=== Kansas Legislature ===
A conservative legislator, Osterman served on the House Health and Human Services, (2) Veterans, Military, and Homeland Security, and Judiciary committees. In 2011, Osterman was given an "A" rating by the NRA Political Victory Fund. He was endorsed by the NRA-PVF in 2014 and retained his "A" rating. He was ranked 83 percent by the Kansas National Federation of Independent Business. Osterman supported legal abortions only when pregnancy results from incest, rape, or a threat to the life of the woman. He sponsored legislation to curtail late-term and partial-birth abortions.

Early in the 2011 session, Osterman introduced a bill to repeal the state law which grants residency for tuition purposes to aliens. A Texas law of this same kind was defended in the 2012 presidential contest by Governor Rick Perry. Though Osterman's bill passed the House, it died before the State and Federal Affairs Committee of the Kansas State Senate. Strongly pro-life, Osterman introduced legislation to amend laws relating to late-term and partial-birth abortion in Kansas. The bill passed in both houses and was signed into law on April 12, 2011, by Republican Governor Sam Brownback.

Osterman obtained approval of a bill to require photographic identification by voters at the precinct, a measure also adopted in Texas in 2011 and signed into law by Governor Perry. The Kansas bill was signed by Governor Brownback on April 18, 2011. Osterman advocated for the Kansas Health Care Freedom Act, which would have exempted the state from the federal health-care law. The measure was withdrawn from the House calendar on February 23, 2011, and sent to the Appropriations Committee. Osterman's proposal to phase out over five years the state income tax on corporations in Kansas was referred to the House Committee on Taxation on February 7, 2011.

Osterman supported the income tax cuts signed into law by Governor Brownback. According to Osterman, the tax cuts "will help stimulate the Kansas economy ... If employers know that the tax rate is stable, they will invest in more equipment and hire new personnel. ... after this law was passed, the governors of Missouri and Oklahoma asked their legislators to lower their tax base [to give] their state a tax cut in order to compete with Kansas."

Osterman said that 65 percent of state funds dedicated to education in Kansas should go directly to the classroom. However, Osterman said the costs of administrative overhead is far too great, a situation that he has observed in the Wichita school district office. He sponsored legislation to bring Covenant marriage to Kansas, a commitment that makes it more difficult for a couple to procure a divorce. He also sponsored a law to permit Kansans to purchase of out-of-state health and accident insurance.

Vietnam War veteran Osterman in 2011 convinced his House colleagues to pass a resolution calling upon the U.S. Congress to provide "equal benefits and compensation" for the treatment of exposure to the defoliant Agent Orange, including those who served both in and outside Vietnam.

==== 2012 election ====
In the Republican primary held on August 7, 2012, Osterman narrowly led Jeff A. Blubaugh (born 1972), a real estate broker and investor, 51 to 49 percent. Blubaugh is a Quaker, a graduate of Friends University in Wichita, and a member of the school board in Goddard, Kansas. In the November 6 general election, Osterman again defeated Dale Swenson, the Democrat whom he had unseated in 2010. Osterman received 4,068 votes (58.4 percent); Swenson, 2,899 (41.6 percent).

Swenson is a former Republican-turned-Democrat, whereas Osterman was a Democrat-turned-Republican. In the 2012 campaign, Swenson said that Osterman "doesn't know what he is doing ... The only people left paying taxes are retired and working people. ... [The Brownback] tax plan] will force either huge cuts in education or big increases in local property taxes." Osterman, however, claimed that the Brownback tax cut will add forty thousand jobs to the Kansas economy and had already brought in four thousand jobs from the anticipation of the tax cut.

== Personal life ==
Osterman was the widower of Deloris D. Osterman (1935–2003) and has a daughter. Osterman was a non-denominational Christian. He was also active in Lions International and the Masonic lodge.

In mid-March 2013, Osterman suffered a heart attack and remained in intensive care for forty-seven days. As a result of his health crisis, he missed 163 roll call votes in the House. Osterman said that he did return to the House a couple of times after he was released from the hospital, "but it almost finished me." He indicated that he returned specifically to vote on the budget.
