= Andy Ireland =

American politician (1930–2024)

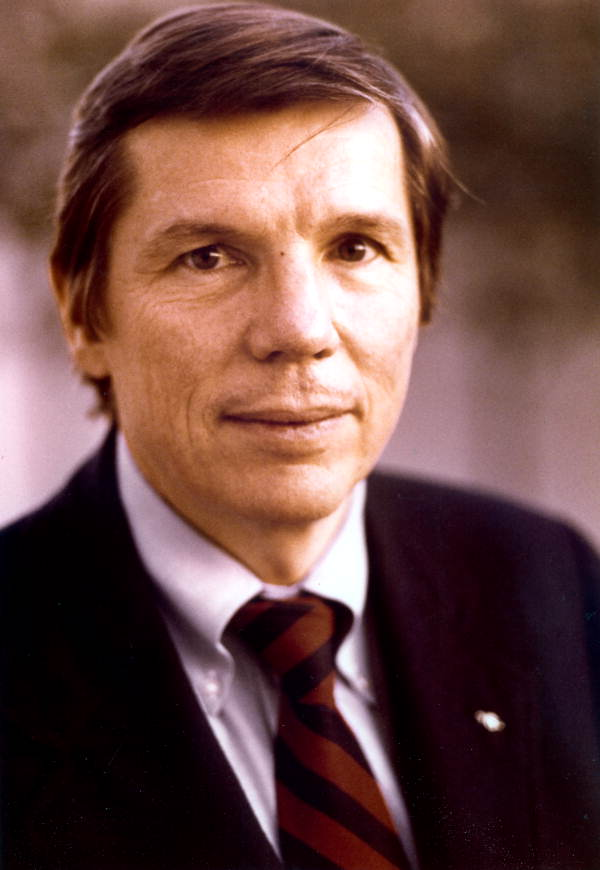
- Ireland in 1976

Member of the U.S. House of Representatives from Florida
- In office January 3, 1977 – January 3, 1993
- Preceded by: James A. Haley
- Succeeded by: Charles T. Canady (Redistricting)
- Constituency: 8th district (1977–1983); 10th district (1983–1993)

Personal details
- Born: Andy Poysell Ireland; August 23, 1930 Cincinnati, Ohio, U.S.
- Died: October 20, 2024 (aged 94) Sarasota, Florida, U.S.
- Party: Republican (1984–2024)
- Other political affiliations: Democratic (until 1984)
- Education: Yale University; Columbia University; Louisiana State University

Andrew Poysell Ireland (August 23, 1930 – October 20, 2024) was an American banker and politician from Florida. He served as a member of the United States House of Representatives from 1977 to 1993. He served eight terms, first as a Democrat, then as a Republican after switching parties in 1984.

== Personal life ==
Born to a wealthy family in Cincinnati, Ohio, he attended a private school within the city. He finished his high school career at Phillips Academy in Andover, Massachusetts. Ireland earned his undergraduate degree in business at Yale University and did graduate studies at Columbia University. Ireland joined Barnett National Bank in Jacksonville, Florida, in 1954, and in 1962 he became the president, chairman and chief executive officer of American National Bank of Winter Haven, Florida. From 1968 to 1970, Ireland served as a member of the board of the Federal Reserve Bank in Atlanta.

Ireland died in Sarasota, Florida, on October 20, 2024, at the age of 94.

== Political career ==
Ireland became involved in politics in 1966, when he successfully ran for the position of Winter Haven city commissioner. In 1981, he served as a delegate to the United Nations.

=== Party switch ===
Ireland was elected as a Democrat to the 95th United States Congress and to the three succeeding Congresses. On March 17, 1984, however, he announced that he had become a Republican, with his party switch becoming official on July 8. He had been one of the more conservative Democrats in the Florida delegation, and had become increasingly uncomfortable with the leftward bent of the national party; in a speech announcing his switch, he said, "I didn't leave the Democratic Party, the Democratic Party left me." Even before his switch, Ireland had worn his party ties so loosely that Speaker Tip O'Neill mused that Ireland "wasn't much of a Democrat anyway." Future Republican National Committee chairman Ed Gillespie, who was a staffer in Ireland's office at the time and switched parties soon after his boss, said that he and Ireland were classic examples of Reagan Democrats who became Republicans–"a southern conservative and a young northeastern ethnic Catholic who no longer felt comfortable in the party of their heritage." All but a few of Ireland's staffers stayed on after the switch, though some of them remained Democrats.

Ireland was reelected as a Republican to the 99th United States Congress and to the three succeeding Congresses. He served in the United States House of Representatives from January 3, 1977, to January 3, 1993, before retiring.

== See also ==
- List of American politicians who switched parties in office
- List of United States representatives who switched parties

U.S. House of Representatives
| Preceded by James A. Haley | Member of the U.S. House of Representatives from Florida's 8th congressional district 1977–1983 | Succeeded by Bill Young |
| Preceded by Louis A. Bafalis | Member of the U.S. House of Representatives from Florida's 10th congressional district 1983–1993 | Succeeded by Bill Young |
