= Mickey Whatley =

American politician

Michael Stewart "Mickey" Homer, Jr. Whatley age 75 when he died, was a Commissioner of the South Carolina Charleston County Parks and Recreation Commission. Previously he was a member of the South Carolina House of Representatives representing the district 113 for two terms ending in 2003. He was the South Carolina's North Charleston Police Chief from 1992 to 1994 and was a Lieutenant for the South Carolina Law Enforcement Division (SLED) from 1984 to 1992. He served in the United States Army from 1958 to 1960 as an artillery gunner and driver for the commanding officer.

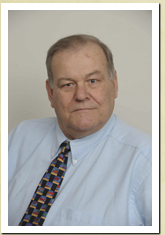
MickeyWhatley NorthCharlestnParksPlayground 2011

== Early life ==
Mickey (named by his older sister, Dorothy Louise (Whatley) Boatwright, because he reminded her of Mickey Mouse when he was young) was born on 7 October 1935 in Charleston, South Carolina, the son of Homer Lee Whatley, Sr. and Louise Ottille (McDonald) Whatley.

Mickey's life was dedicated to public service. He began at the Post & Courier News as a journeyman printer but enlisted in the US Army serving from 1958 to 1960.

Mickey was first a fireman and later a police officer for Charleston County. Mickey's father, Lawrence Stewart, was a county policeman and the first to be recognized as Policeman of the Year by the Kiwanis Club; Mickey also received this award. Mickey was part of the original police force in North Charleston and became one of the City's first detectives.

He attended the Southern Police Institute and held a Bachelor of Science degree with a double major in Political Science and Criminal Justice from the Baptist College (now known as Charleston Southern University.)

Mickey was a Lieutenant for the South Carolina Law Enforcement Division (SLED) from 1984 to 1992 and served as Chief of Police for the City of North Charleston from 1992 to 1994.

He served two terms in the SC House of Representatives for District 113. He was a commissioner for the Charleston County Parks and Recreation Department. Mickey's past affiliations include: Past President of the South Carolina Chapter of the FBI National Academy, a member of the National Law Enforcement Explorer Commission, the International Association of Police Chiefs, the Environmental Crimes Commission, and National Boy Scouts Council of America.

Mickey has four children: Tim, Todd, Leah and Buck. His brother, Bill; sisters, Pat and Julie; He has three grandchildren. He had two former wives, Pacita (married 1967 - 1987) and Evette (married 1992 - 1994).

=== Committee assignments ===
Whatley served on the following committees in the state house:

- Judiciary

== Party Switch ==
Made national headlines when both he and Representative Margaret Gamble switched from the Republican to Democratic parties in 2000.

== Death ==
Mickey Whatley died on August 16, 2011, at his home. He died at age 75. He was preceded in death by his parents, Louise Ottille McDonald)Stewart, Lawrence C. Stewart; and sister Dorothy Louise (Whatley) Boatwright. His burial and dedicated sculpture of him while a young Charleston County police officer is located at Carolina Memorial Park, North Charleston, South Carolina, US.

Video of speakers Senator Jake Knotts, Rev. Dr. Samuel Whatley and Mr. Buck Whatley
