= List of United States representatives who switched parties =

This list includes United States representatives who switched parties while serving in Congress.

== 19th century ==
Name	State	District	Date	Congress	Old party	New party	Notes
Galusha A. Grow	Pennsylvania	14th	February–June 1856	34th	Democratic	Republican	He switched parties in the wake of President Pierce's signing of the Kansas–Nebraska Act.

== 20th century ==
Name	State	District	Date	Congress	Old party	New party	Notes
John J. O'Connor	New York	16th	October 24, 1938	75th	Democratic	Republican	Lost Democratic renomination, defeated for re-election as a Republican.
Franklin D. Roosevelt Jr.	New York	20th	January 3, 1951	82nd	Liberal	Democratic	Roosevelt was re-elected as a Democrat.
Albert Watson	South Carolina	2nd	February–June 1965	90th	Democratic	Republican	Watson resigned his seat as a Democrat on February 1, 1965, and then won a special election as a Republican on June 15, 1965.
Ogden Reid	New York	26th	March 22, 1972	92nd	Republican	Democratic	
Donald W. Riegle	Michigan	7th	February 27, 1973	93rd	Republican	Democratic	
John Jarman	Oklahoma	5th	January 24, 1975	94th	Democratic	Republican	
Eugene Atkinson	Pennsylvania	25th	October 14, 1981	97th	Democratic	Republican	
Bob Stump	Arizona	3rd	July 1982	97th	Democratic	Republican	
Phil Gramm	Texas	6th	January/February 1983	98th	Democratic	Republican	Gramm resigned his seat as a Democrat on January 5, 1983, and then won a special election as a Republican on February 12, 1983.
Andy Ireland	Florida	10th	July 5, 1984	98th	Democratic	Republican	
William Carney	New York	1st	October 7, 1985	99th	Conservative	Republican	
Bill Grant	Florida	2nd	February 21, 1989	101st	Democratic	Republican	
Tommy F. Robinson	Arkansas	2nd	July 28, 1989	101st	Democratic	Republican	
Nathan Deal	Georgia	9th	April 10, 1995	104th	Democratic	Republican	
Greg Laughlin	Texas	14th	June 26, 1995	104th	Democratic	Republican	
Billy Tauzin	Louisiana	3rd	August 8, 1995	104th	Democratic	Republican	
Michael Parker	Mississippi	4th	November 10, 1995	104th	Democratic	Republican	
Jo Ann Emerson	Missouri	8th	January 3, 1997	105th	Republican	Independent	Emerson was re-elected to a full term as an independent after running under that designation to comply with Missouri's electoral law.
Jo Ann Emerson	Missouri	8th	January 8, 1997	105th	Independent	Republican	
Michael Forbes	New York	1st	July 17, 1999	106th	Republican	Democratic	

== 21st century ==
Name	State	District	Date	Congress	Old party	New party	Notes
Virgil Goode	Virginia	5th	January 27, 2000	106th	Democratic	Independent	
Matthew G. Martinez	California	31st	July 27, 2000	106th	Democratic	Republican	
Virgil Goode	Virginia	5th	August 1, 2002	107th	Independent	Republican	
Ralph Hall	Texas	4th	January 5, 2004	108th	Democratic	Republican	
Rodney Alexander	Louisiana	5th	August 9, 2004	108th	Democratic	Republican	
Parker Griffith	Alabama	5th	December 22, 2009	111th	Democratic	Republican	
Justin Amash	Michigan	3rd	July 4, 2019	116th	Republican	Independent	Amash became an independent on July 4, 2019, and then a Libertarian on April 29, 2020.
Justin Amash	Michigan	3rd	April 29, 2020	116th	Independent	Libertarian	Amash became an independent on July 4, 2019, and then a Libertarian on April 29, 2020.
Jeff Van Drew	New Jersey	2nd	December 19, 2019	116th	Democratic	Republican	Van Drew switched parties in the wake of the first impeachment of Donald Trump, which he opposed.
Paul Mitchell	Michigan	10th	December 14, 2020	116th	Republican	Independent	
Kevin Kiley	California	3rd	March 9, 2026	119th	Republican	Independent	Continued to caucus with the Republicans.

== See also ==
- List of United States senators who switched parties
- List of party switchers in the United States
- Party switching
