= Videt Carmichael =

American politician

Member of the Mississippi State Senate from the 33rd district
- In office January 4, 2000 – April 2019
- Preceded by: Brad Carter
- Succeeded by: Jeff Tate

Personal details
- Born: Fredie Videt Carmichael; February 26, 1950 (age 76) Meridian, Mississippi, U.S.
- Party: Republican (2002–present); Democratic (1999–2002)
- Spouse: Donna Smith
- Education: Mississippi State University
- Occupation: Retired educator and principal

Fredie Videt Carmichael (born February 26, 1950) is a Republican who served in the Mississippi State Senate, representing District 33, which encompasses Lauderdale and Clarke counties in the eastern portion of Mississippi. He first entered the Senate in 2000, and left in April 2019.

== Background ==
Carmichael is a native of Meridian, Mississippi. He graduated from Clarkdale High School in Lauderdale County and obtained two degrees in education from Mississippi State University at Starkville.

== Career ==
Carmichael was a teacher, coach, and principal prior to running for office. He was first elected to the Senate in 1999 as a Democrat. In May 2002, Carmichael, citing "conscience," switched to Republican affiliation. He was welcomed to the party by state chairman Jim Herring. In 2015, Carmichael proposed a bill to prevent the Common Core State Standards Initiative from becoming law in Mississippi.

== Personal life ==
Carmichael is married to the former Donna Smith. They have two children. He is a Baptist. In 2014, he was hospitalized after he fell in his apartment in the capital city of Jackson. He recovered several weeks later and successfully sought reelection in 2015, when he defeated Democrat Chase Callahan (born 1987), also of Meridian. Carmichael won the race, 75 to 25 percent.

== See also ==
- List of American politicians who switched parties in office
