= Dale Swenson =

American politician

Member of the Kansas House of Representatives from the 97th district
- In office January 9, 1995 – January 10, 2011
- Preceded by: Darrel M. Webb
- Succeeded by: Leslie Osterman

Personal details
- Born: March 2, 1957 (age 69) Wichita, Kansas, U.S.
- Party: Democratic (since 2008); Republican (before 2008)
- Spouse: Roberta
- Children: Neil; Amy
- Occupation: Retired Parts Painter

Dale Swenson (born March 2, 1957) is a Democratic former member of the Kansas House of Representatives from the 97th district in Wichita, Kansas, Kansas. From 1995 to 2008, he served as a Republican lawmaker; in 2009, he began a single two-year term as a Democrat. He was unseated on November 2, 2010, by the Democrat-turned-Republican Leslie Osterman, a retired health systems analyst from Wichita.

In 2012, Swenson lost a rematch with Osterman. He received 2,899 votes (41.6 percent) to Osterman's 4,068 votes (58.4 percent).

== Committee membership ==
- Federal and State Affairs
- Financial Institutions
- Joint Committee on Arts and Cultural Resources
- Joint Committee on Pensions, Investments and Benefits
- Insurance

== Major donors ==
The top 5 donors to Swenson's 2008 campaign:

- 1. Kansas National Education Assoc $1,000
- 2. Kansas Contractors Assoc $1,000
- 3. Service Employees International Union Missouri Council $1,000
- 4. Kansas Trial Lawyers Assoc $1,000
- 5. Kansans for Lifesaving Cures $750

== Personal life ==
Swenson is married with two children. He was a painter at Boeing prior to being laid off when the company closed their Wichita plant.

On February 18, 2006, Swenson was arrested for driving under the influence. Following the arrest, Swenson stopped drinking.

== See also ==
- List of American politicians who switched parties in office
