= Dan Hynes (New Hampshire politician) =

American politician

Member of the New Hampshire House of Representatives from the Hillsborough 2nd district
- In office December 7, 2022 – February 9, 2024

Member of the New Hampshire House of Representatives from the Hillsborough 21st district
- In office 2016 – June 1, 2018

Personal details
- Party: Independent (from 2023)
- Other political affiliations: Republican (until 2023)

Dan Hynes is an American politician. He served as an Independent member for the Hillsborough 2nd district of the New Hampshire House of Representatives. He was elected as a Republican but left the party and registered as an independent in June 2023. He resigned from the New Hampshire House in February 2024.

== See also ==
- List of American politicians who switched parties in office
