= List of United States senators who switched parties =

This list includes United States senators who switched parties while serving in the Senate.

== List ==
=== 19th century ===
Name	State	Date	Congress	Old party	New party	Notes
James H. Kyle	South Dakota	1891	52nd	Independent	Populist	
William Morris Stewart	Nevada	1893	53rd	Republican	Silver; Republican	The Silver Republicans' seniority and committee assignments were not affected by their having left the party.
John P. Jones	Nevada	September 4, 1894	53rd	Republican	Silver; Republican	The Silver Republicans' seniority and committee assignments were not affected by their having left the party.
Henry M. Teller	Colorado	June 17, 1896	54th	Republican	Silver; Republican	The Silver Republicans' seniority and committee assignments were not affected by their having left the party.
Lee Mantle	Montana	June 17, 1896	54th	Republican	Silver; Republican	The Silver Republicans' seniority and committee assignments were not affected by their having left the party.
Richard F. Pettigrew	South Dakota	June 17, 1896	54th	Republican	Silver; Republican	The Silver Republicans' seniority and committee assignments were not affected by their having left the party.
Frank J. Cannon	Utah	June 17, 1896	54th	Republican	Silver; Republican	The Silver Republicans' seniority and committee assignments were not affected by their having left the party.
Fred Dubois	Idaho	1896	54th	Republican	Silver; Republican	The Silver Republicans' seniority and committee assignments were not affected by their having left the party.
James H. Kyle	South Dakota	1897	55th	Populist	Republican	The Silver Republicans' seniority and committee assignments were not affected by their having left the party.
William Morris Stewart	Nevada	December 4, 1899	56th	Silver; Republican	Republican	The Silver Republicans' seniority and committee assignments were not affected by their having left the party.

=== 20th century ===
Name	State	Date	Congress	Old party	New party	Notes
John P. Jones	Nevada	1901	56th	Silver; Republican	Republican	
Fred Dubois	Idaho	1901	56th	Silver; Republican	Democratic	DuBois lost his re-election bid in 1896, was again elected as a Silver Republican in 1900, but became a Democrat early in the term.
Henry M. Teller	Colorado	March 4, 1901	56th	Silver; Republican	Democratic	
Miles Poindexter	Washington	1913	63rd	Republican	Progressive	
Miles Poindexter	Washington	1915	64th	Progressive	Republican	
Robert M. La Follette Jr.	Wisconsin	1935	74th	Republican	Progressive	Caucused with the Republicans; briefly returned before losing in 1946.
George W. Norris	Nebraska	1937	75th	Republican	Independent	
Henrik Shipstead	Minnesota	1940	76th	Farmer–Labor	Republican	
Wayne Morse	Oregon	1953	83rd	Republican	Independent	
Wayne Morse	Oregon	February 17, 1955	84th	Independent	Democratic	
Strom Thurmond	South Carolina	September 16, 1964	88th	Democratic	Republican	
Harry F. Byrd Jr.	Virginia	1970	91st	Democratic	Independent	Kept seniority, but did not caucus with the Democrats
James L. Buckley	New York	1976	94th	Conservative	Republican	
Richard Shelby	Alabama	November 9, 1994	103rd	Democratic	Republican	
Ben Nighthorse Campbell	Colorado	March 3, 1995	104th	Democratic	Republican	
Robert C. Smith	New Hampshire					
Robert C. Smith	New Hampshire	July 13, 1999	106th	Republican	Taxpayers	
Robert C. Smith	New Hampshire	August 1999	106th	Taxpayers	Independent	
Robert C. Smith	New Hampshire	November 1, 1999	106th	Independent	Republican	

=== 21st century ===
Name	State	Date	Congress	Old party	New party	Notes
Jim Jeffords	Vermont	June 6, 2001	107th	Republican	Independent	Caucused with the Democrats. Gave Democrats temporary control of the senate.
Joe Lieberman	Connecticut	2006	110th	Democratic	Independent; Democrat	Caucused with the Democrats. Lieberman was re-elected on the Connecticut for Lieberman ticket; however, he never formally joined that political party.
Arlen Specter	Pennsylvania	April 28, 2009	111th	Republican	Democratic	Originally a Democrat
Kyrsten Sinema	Arizona	December 9, 2022	117th	Democratic	Independent	Caucused with the Democrats
Joe Manchin	West Virginia	May 31, 2024	118th	Democratic	Independent	Caucused with the Democrats

== See also ==
- Party switching in the United States
- List of United States representatives who switched parties
- Party switching
- Crossing the floor
