= Arthur G. Froe =

American lawyer and politician (1876–1932)

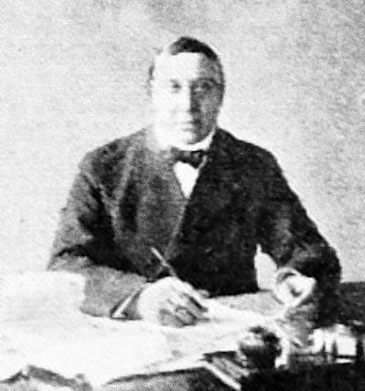
- Portrait of Froe, published in The Crisis, November 1922.

Recorder of Deeds for the District of Columbia
- In office 1922–1930
- President: Warren G. Harding; Calvin Coolidge; Herbert Hoover
- Preceded by: John F. Costello
- Succeeded by: Jefferson S. Coage

Personal details
- Born: March 24, 1876 Abingdon, Virginia, U.S. (Note: Froe's death certificate, completed by his wife, and his November 27, 1932, obituary in the Bluefield Daily Telegraph list his place of birth as Abingdon, Virginia; however, Froe's family reported to the Bluefield Daily Telegraph that his place of birth was in Russell County, Virginia.)
- Died: November 26, 1932 (aged 56) Welch, West Virginia, U.S.
- Resting place: Blandford Cemetery, Petersburg, Virginia, U.S.
- Party: Republican
- Spouse: Hattie C. Johnson Froe
- Education: Virginia Normal and Collegiate Institute; Shaw University; Howard University School of Law
- Profession: Lawyer and politician

Arthur Glenn Froe (March 24, 1876 – November 26, 1932) was an American lawyer and politician. He was appointed by President Warren G. Harding as the Recorder of Deeds for the District of Columbia, and served in this position from 1922 to 1930 during the presidential administrations of Harding, Calvin Coolidge, and Herbert Hoover.

Froe was born in Virginia in 1876, and attended Virginia Normal and Collegiate Institute. He served as a public schoolteacher before continuing his graduate studies at Shaw University and Howard University School of Law. In 1906, Froe relocated to Welch, West Virginia, where he established a law office, and later had a law firm with West Virginia House Delegate Harry J. Capehart and Leon P. Miller. Froe represented both African-American and white clients, including marginalized white ethnic groups.

Froe was active in West Virginia Republican Party politics. He served as a member of the board of education for McDowell County's Browns Creek school district from 1914 until 1919, and following the recommendation of West Virginia Governor John J. Cornwell, President Woodrow Wilson appointed Froe to a legal advisory board for McDowell County's draft boards during World War I. In 1921, Senator Davis Elkins and Congressperson Wells Goodykoontz, recommended Froe for the post Recorder of Deeds of the District of Columbia. President Harding announced Froe's appointment on February 1, 1922; the Senate confirmed him on February 15, and he took his oath of office on March 1. During his tenure, Froe sought support from Congress for higher salaries and increased office space for his agency. Froe served as recorder until his resignation in 1930. In September 1932, Senator Henry D. Hatfield named Froe as a member of the West Virginia Republican Party's advisory committee, aiding the party's campaigns ahead of the 1932 elections. Froe died in November 1932 following an extended illness.

== Early life and education ==
Arthur Glenn Froe was born in Abingdon, Virginia, on March 24, 1876, where he spent his early childhood. He was the son of Cheshire C. Froe and Leah Singleton Froe, and he had one sister, Cleopatra Froe.

Froe was a nephew of prominent local merchant U. S. G. Froe. He attended public school in Pocahontas, Tazewell County, Virginia, from where he relocated to Petersburg, Virginia, and attended Virginia Normal and Collegiate Institute. Following his graduation from the institute, Froe became an active alumnus and regularly attended meetings of the institute's alumni association and commencement ceremonies. After graduating, Froe returned to Pocahontas, where he taught in the town's public schools. He later attended Shaw University in Raleigh, North Carolina, and Howard University School of Law.

== Early law and political careers ==
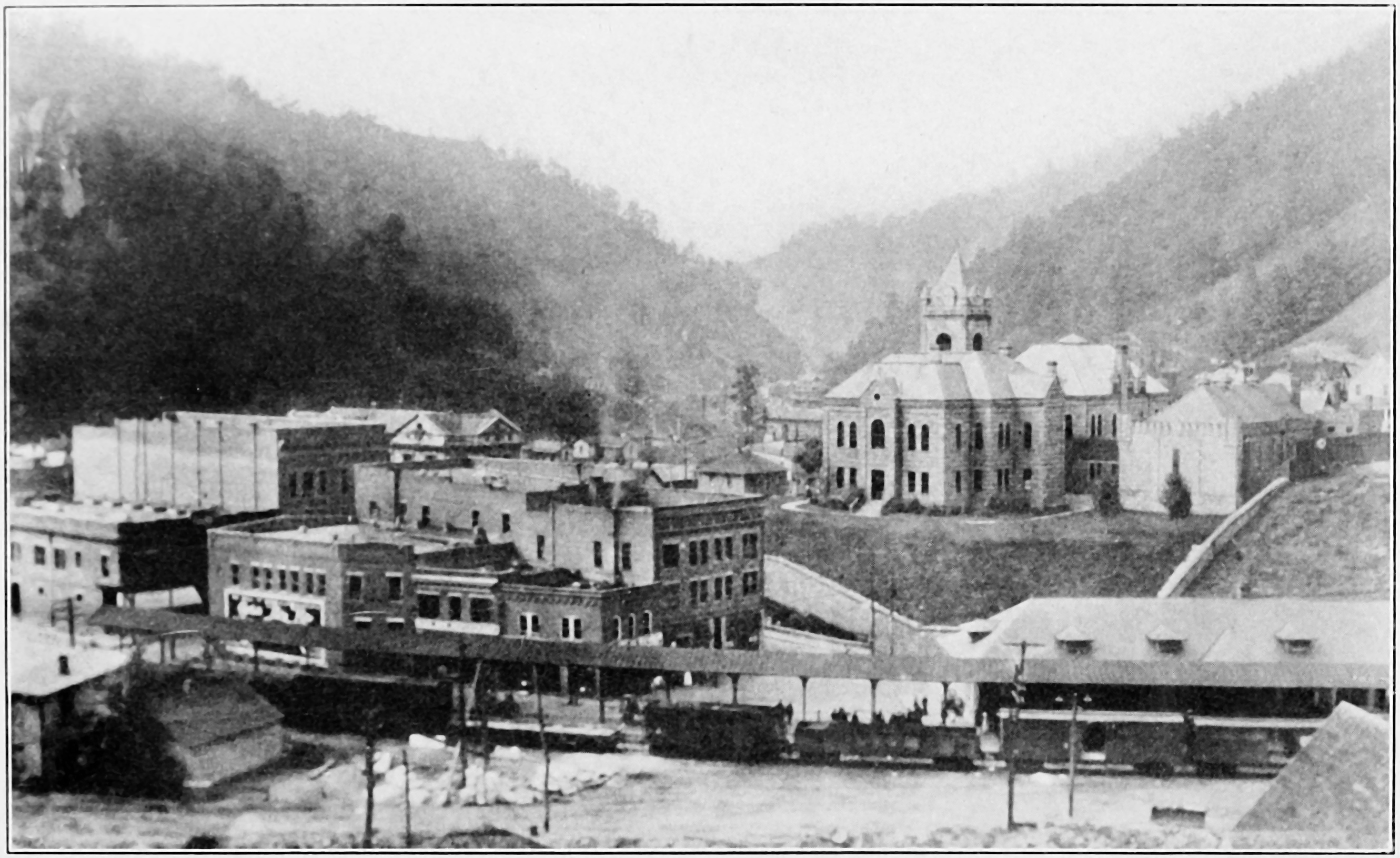
Downtown Welch, 1915

Froe moved to Welch, West Virginia, in 1906 and established a law office. He later started the law firm Froe, Capehart, and Miller, in which Froe was senior partner with West Virginia House Delegate Harry J. Capehart and Leon P. Miller. Froe represented both African-American and white clients, including marginalized white ethnic groups Hungarians, Italians, and Slavs. He and Capehart represented Joseph Parise and Cosimo Spadaro, who in 1915 were indicted on charges of first-degree murder in connection with a strike riot in Farmington.

In Welch, Froe became active in West Virginia Republican Party politics. Froe represented West Virginia at the Second Annual National Negro Educational Congress in Denver in 1911, where resolutions condemning mob violence and opposing the different application of law for African-Americans were adopted. By 1913, he was named treasurer of the McDowell County Colored Republican Organization, which was responsible for a growing number of African-American appointed and elected officials. Froe served as a member of the board of education for McDowell County's Browns Creek school district from 1914 to 1919. (Note: According to the West Virginia Educational Directory, Froe served as a member of Browns Creek district school board for the 1914–15, 1915–16, 1916–17, 1917–18, and 1918–19 school years.) In addition, President Woodrow Wilson appointed Froe to a legal advisory board for McDowell County's draft boards during World War I following a recommendation from West Virginia Governor John J. Cornwell.

In February 1915, Froe and African-American McDowell County lawyer E. H. Harper appeared before the West Virginia Senate committee on railroads at the final hearing for the "Full Crew Bill", which would have required railroad companies to hire additional brakemen on trains, thereby displacing African-American porters. In his statement, Froe protested on behalf of all African-American railroad employees and argued such a law was unnecessary because West Virginia's Public Service Commission already had the power to prescribe what constituted a full crew. At a September 1917 meeting of the Negro Bar Association of West Virginia, Froe recognized the absence of African-American judges in West Virginia and offered a resolution to extend honorary membership to the state's African-American justices of the peace, which was approved.

== Recorder of Deeds for the District of Columbia ==
=== Nomination and confirmation ===
Froe was endorsed by the McDowell County Colored Republican Organization for the position of Assistant United States Attorney for the Southern District of West Virginia. In December 1921, however, West Virginia Republicans Senator Davis Elkins and Congressperson Wells Goodykoontz of West Virginia's 5th congressional district announced their intent to recommend Froe for the post Recorder of Deeds for the District of Columbia. On February 1, 1922, Senator Elkins, Congressperson Goodykoontz, and Froe held a closed meeting with President Warren G. Harding, who had previously nominated Henry Lincoln Johnson to the post, a nomination the Senate had rejected. Senator Elkins described Froe as "an able lawyer" and "a colored man of the highest standing in the southern part of West Virginia" in his nomination letter to President Harding, and he recommended Froe to recognize West Virginia's African-American Republican voters. On February 1, 1922, following their meeting, President Harding formally announced his nomination of Froe for Recorder of Deeds to succeed John F. Costello.

In a later speech at a conference of West Virginia African-American Republicans, Froe stated West Virginia's African-American voters "constituted a power that demanded recognition in both the state and nation". President Harding echoed this sentiment by stating; "colored voters of West Virginia, holding the balance of power feel that they are entitled to recognition". While Froe was being considered for this position, he received letters of endorsement from both Northern and Southern African-Americans, who emphasized the significance of his appointment for the advancement of the African-American community.

At the time of Froe's appointment and tenure, the Recorder of Deeds was one of the highest U.S. government positions held by African-Americans and all but three appointees who served in this post were African-American. Froe's predecessor Costello was white; Froe's appointment returned an African-American to the post. President Woodrow Wilson had appointed Costello following a campaign by the National Democratic Fair Play Association to whiten U.S. government offices and an accusation by a white female Record of Deeds copyist, Irene Monroe, she had been preyed upon by African-American men in that office. Following Froe's appointment, California Republican Congressperson Julius Kahn cautioned Froe against disturbing Monroe's position in the office.

The Senate confirmed Froe's appointment on February 15, 1922, and he took his oath of office as Recorder of Deeds on March 1. He was sworn in by William E. Williams, assistant clerk of the Supreme Court of the District of Columbia. At Froe's induction ceremony, he said; "I shall endeavor to conduct the work of the office with credit to the cause and the race which I represent".

=== Tenure ===
At the onset of his tenure, Froe deplored the low salaries of the Recorder of Deeds' employees and stated one of his missions was to increase their salaries. At the time of his arrival to his post, the Recorder of Deeds office had over 50 employees―many of whom were African-American―and occupied four floors in the Century Building at 412 5th Street in the Judiciary Square neighborhood of Northwest Washington, D.C. Froe soon found the need for more office space for the Recorder of Deeds staff and in November 1922, he sought support in Congress for a new office building at the cost of $250,000 (equivalent to $4,808,648 in 2025). The following year, Froe also identified the need for more office space for the storage of the documents under his charge and enlisted the support of Congress and President Calvin Coolidge for an appropriation of $500,000 (equivalent to $9,448,242 in 2025) to build a new Recorder of Deeds office building.

President Coolidge reappointed Froe to the position in 1926. In August 1927, the General Accounting Office determined Froe's salary was not subject to deductions under the Civil Service Retirement Act because he was a presidential appointee and was not within the classified civil service. Froe had questioned such deductions to his salary by his deputy recorder and disbursing officer Robert W. Dutton. In 1928, the Bureau of Efficiency released a report with recommendations to improve the efficiency of the Recorder of Deeds office to yield an estimated cost savings of $124,000 per year (equivalent to $2,325,000 in 2025). While Froe approved the majority of the report's findings and recommendations, he objected to some of the cost-cutting recommendations because they could be construed as racially discriminatory. A house sub-committee led by Ernest Willard Gibson inquired why the Recorder of Deeds office did not implement these recommendations. Later in 1928, Froe identified the need for Congress to update the District of Columbia's code for incorporating companies. He found the law, which required every stock share to be subscribed for in good faith, prevented companies from holding treasury stock. This requirement discouraged the incorporation of companies in Washington, D.C., depriving the district of potential revenue. At Froe's request, in December 1928, Maryland Republican Congressperson Frederick Nicholas Zihlman introduced a bill to update the code and enable companies to have treasury stock.

In 1930, Senator Henry D. Hatfield and West Virginia's Republican congressional delegation urged President Herbert Hoover to retain Froe as Recorder of Deeds. Froe had the support of Hatfield, all five of West Virginia's Republican congressmen, the state's Republican governor, and the state's Republican national committee members. Froe was a popular African-American politician and the turnout of West Virginia's African-American electorate was critical for ensuring Republican Party campaign victories at the state and national levels. West Virginia Republicans recognized the African-American vote represented the balance of power in the 1930 elections, and were concerned Democrats would "alienate the negro vote from the Republican ticket". In September 1930—two months before the 1930 election—however, District of Columbia Auditor Daniel J. Donovan accused Froe of being unable to effectively carry out his duties. In response, Hoover demanded and received Froe's resignation, and appointed Jefferson S. Coage to succeed him. Senator Hatfield threatened to fight Hoover's nomination of Coage on the Senate floor but Hatfield was later appeased by lesser appointments. Froe served as Recorder of Deeds during the presidential administrations of Harding, Coolidge, and Hoover. While serving in his post, Froe resided at 1724 S Street in Northwest Washington, D.C.

== Personal life, death, and legacy ==
Froe married Hattie C. Johnson of Petersburg, Virginia. He was a member of the McDowell County Bar Association and the Negro Bar Association of West Virginia. In addition, Froe was a member of the Improved Benevolent and Protective Order of Elks of the World, served as a grand district deputy, and attended their sessions in Baltimore and Cleveland. Froe became known for his abilities as an orator, regularly delivering speeches and lectures, and multiple newspapers referred to him as "the colored William Jennings Bryan". In April 1925, Froe delivered an address to the Annual Conference of the Association of Mail Carriers in Norfolk, Virginia, and in November 1927, he gave a talk on records management entitled "What Papers Are Recordable and the Effect of Recordations". A September 1918 article in The McDowell Times described Froe as the wealthiest African-American man in McDowell County.

In April 1930, Froe attended the conference establishing the National Negro Republican League organization. In September 1932, Senator Hatfield named Froe as a member of the West Virginia Republican Party's advisory committee, aiding the party's campaign effort ahead of the 1932 elections. In late 1932, Froe's health declined due to a heart-related illness and he was hospitalized at Stevens Clinic Hospital in Welch for approximately a month, and died there at 7:37 p.m. on November 26, 1932. Froe was interred at Blandford Cemetery in Petersburg, Virginia, on November 30, 1932.

Following his death in 1932, former students of Froe remarked on his abilities as a teacher. In December 1936, portraits of 12 Recorders of Deeds, including Froe, were unveiled at the United States Department of Labor. The portraits were requested by the Recorder of Deeds William J. Thompkins and were painted by Public Works Administration artists. Froe's former law partner Capehart was among the attendees who were invited to pay tribute at the unveiling ceremony.

While Froe's attempts to secure a new building for the Recorder of Deeds office were unsuccessful during his tenure, the agency eventually received the newly completed Recorder of Deeds Building at 515 D Street, Northwest, in 1943, under Recorder of Deeds Thompkins.

== Bibliography ==
- Butler, Sara A. (2011). "Ground Breaking in New Deal Washington, DC: Art, Patronage, and Race at the Recorder of Deeds Building". Winterthur Portfolio. 45 (4). Chicago, Illinois: University of Chicago Press: 277–320. doi:10.1086/663159. JSTOR 10.1086/663159. S2CID 142646632.
- Hess, Elmer C., ed. (1928). Official Congressional Directory: 70th Congress, 1st Session (2nd ed.). Washington D.C.: U.S. Government Printing Office – via the Internet Archive.
- Lisio, Donald J. (1985). Hoover, Blacks, & Lily-Whites: A Study of Southern Strategies. Chapel Hill, North Carolina: University of North Carolina Press. ISBN 978-0-8078-1645-5. OCLC 564825552 – via the Internet Archive.
- Miller, Rebecca (August 4, 2011). Historic Preservation Review Board Application for Historic Landmark or Historic District Designation: Recorder of Deeds Building (PDF). Washington, D.C.: District of Columbia Office of Planning. Archived (PDF) from the original on September 18, 2021.
- Nowlin, William F. (1970). The Negro In American National Politics. New York City, New York: Russell and Russell. OCLC 575577142 – via the Internet Archive.
- Shawkey, M. P., ed. (1914). West Virginia Educational Directory, For the School Year 1914–15. Education directory. Charleston, West Virginia: Tribune Printing Company. Archived from the original on November 28, 2021 – via HathiTrust.
- Shawkey, M. P., ed. (1915). West Virginia Educational Directory, For the School Year 1915–16. Education directory. Charleston, West Virginia: Tribune Printing Company. Archived from the original on November 28, 2021 – via HathiTrust.
- Shawkey, M. P., ed. (1916). West Virginia Educational Directory, For the School Year 1916–17. Education directory. Charleston, West Virginia: Tribune Printing Company. Archived from the original on November 28, 2021 – via HathiTrust.
- Shawkey, M. P., ed. (1917). West Virginia Educational Directory, For the School Year 1917–18. Education directory. Charleston, West Virginia: Tribune Printing Company. Archived from the original on November 28, 2021 – via HathiTrust.
- Shawkey, M. P., ed. (1918). West Virginia Educational Directory, For the School Year 1918–19. Education directory. Charleston, West Virginia: Tribune Printing Company. Archived from the original on November 28, 2021 – via HathiTrust.
- Sherman, Richard B. (1973). The Republican Party and Black America from McKinley to Hoover, 1896–1933. Charlottesville, Virginia: University Press of Virginia. ISBN 978-0-8139-0467-2. OCLC 1036841302 – via the Internet Archive.
- Smith, J. Clay Jr. (1993). Emancipation: The Making of the Black Lawyer 1844–1944. Philadelphia, Pennsylvania: University of Pennsylvania Press. ISBN 978-0-8122-1685-1. OCLC 491962363 – via the Internet Archive.
- Thomas, Jerry Bruce (1998). An Appalachian New Deal: West Virginia in the Great Depression. Lexington, Kentucky: University Press of Kentucky. ISBN 978-0-8131-2064-5. OCLC 605372844 – via the Internet Archive.
- Trotter, Joe William Jr. (1990). Coal, Class, and Color: Blacks in Southern West Virginia, 1915-32. Champaign, Illinois: University of Illinois Press. ISBN 978-0-252-06119-6. OCLC 20628157. Archived from the original on November 28, 2021 – via Google Books.
- United States Congress (March 1, 1922). "Volume 62, Part 3 (February 6, 1922 to March 1, 1922)" (PDF). Congressional Record (Bound Edition). 62 (3). Washington D.C.: U.S. Government Printing Office – via Govinfo.gov.
- Weaver, Frederick S. (1947). Murray, Florence (ed.). "Recorders of Deeds for the District of Columbia". The Negro Handbook, 1946–1947. New York City, New York: Current Books, Inc.: 305–307. OCLC 793915469 – via the Internet Archive.
- West Virginia Department of Military Census and Enrollment (1920). Organization and the Execution of the Selective Service Act in the State of West Virginia. Charleston, West Virginia: Tribune Printing Company. OCLC 610428687 – via the Internet Archive.
- Yellin, Eric S. (2013). Racism in the Nation's Service: Government Workers and the Color Line in Woodrow Wilson's America. Chapel Hill, North Carolina: University of North Carolina Press. ISBN 978-1-4696-0721-4. OCLC 1162343945. Archived from the original on November 28, 2021 – via Google Books.

Political offices
Preceded by John F. Costello	Recorder of Deeds for the District of Columbia; 1922–1930	Succeeded by Jefferson S. Coage
