= 1916 West Virginia Women's Suffrage Amendment =

State referendum to grant women voting rights

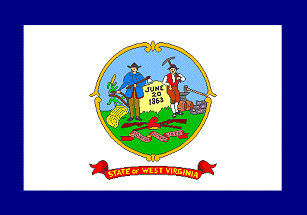
- November 7, 1916
- Female Suffrage Amendment, amending Section One of Article Four

Results
Choice	Votes	%
Yes	63,540	28.22%
No	161,607	71.78%
Yes
50–60%
No
80–90%
70–80%
60–70%
50–60%

In 1916, West Virginia held a referendum on a state-level constitutional amendment to grant women the right of suffrage. The ballot measure was defeated with over 71% of votes cast in opposition, and with all but 2 of the state's counties voting against.

== Background ==
Before the election, The McDowell Times released a newspaper with a section titled: "SUFFRAGE IS SURE TO WIN". The paper believed that more people were beginning to back women's suffrage, saying, "As that November day approaches which shall decide the status of the women of this Commonwealth there seems to be a general scramble to get on to the equal franchise bandwagon."

== Positions ==
Support

Governors

- George Atkinson, 10th governor of West Virginia (1897–1901)
- William Glasscock, 13th governor of West Virginia, (1909–1913)
- Henry Hatfield, 14th governor of West Virginia (1913–1917)

Newspapers

The McDowell Times

== Contents ==
The following was shown to voters on the ballot for the amendment:

BALLOT ON CONSTITUTIONAL AMENDMENT

Female Suffrage Amendment, amending Section One of Article Four

[] For ratification of Female Suffrage Amendment

[] Against ratification of Female Suffrage Amendment

== Results ==
County	Yes %	No %	Total
Barbour	22.4	77.6	3,710
Berkeley	24.6	75.4	3,909
Boone	27.1	72.9	2,506
Braxton	22.9	77.1	4,674
Brooke	53.4	46.6	1,948
Cabell	26.6	73.4	9,437
Calhoun	22.5	77.5	1,940
Clay	14.2	85.8	1,787
Doddridge	23.9	76.1	2,307
Fayette	27.4	72.6	7,598
Gilmer	24.4	75.6	2,364
Grant	12.5	87.5	1,571
Greenbrier	20.1	79.9	5,018
Hampshire	15.8	84.2	2,407
Hancock	59.8	40.2	1,514
Hardy	11.5	88.5	1,984
Harrison	37.4	62.6	9,903
Jackson	27.3	72.7	4,096
Jefferson	24.6	75.4	2,975
Kanawha	25.8	74.2	15,494
Lewis	29.6	70.4	3,962
Lincoln	12.7	87.3	3,679
Logan	23.6	76.4	3,630
Marion	42.2	57.8	7,993
Marshall	38.9	61.1	4,951
Mason	32.5	67.5	3,900
McDowell	22.9	77.1	6,268
Mercer	18.1	81.9	7,212
Mineral	33.2	66.8	3,004
Mingo	21.4	78.6	3,321
Monongalia	39.0	61.0	4,583
Monroe	10.2	89.8	2,852
Morgan	28.7	71.3	1,541
Nicholas	25.9	74.1	3,838
Ohio	42.9	57.1	10,527
Pendleton	10.5	89.5	1,927
Pleasants	30.4	69.6	1,404
Pocahontas	22.4	77.6	2,758
Preston	37.8	62.2	4,795
Putnam	17.0	83.0	3,371
Raleigh	16.3	83.7	5,296
Randolph	30.4	69.6	4,761
Ritchie	33.5	66.5	3,309
Roane	19.8	80.2	3,987
Summers	18.9	81.1	3,437
Taylor	35.7	64.3	3,031
Tucker	31.1	68.9	2,573
Tyler	31.7	68.3	2,679
Upshur	29.9	70.1	3,272
Wayne	21.2	78.8	4,028
Webster	19.0	81.0	2,114
Wetzel	30.6	69.4	3,800
Wirt	25.5	74.5	1,772
Wood	45.2	54.8	7,220
Wyoming	22.7	77.3	1,760

== Later events ==
In 1920, West Virginia's legislature agreed to ratify the 19th Amendment, the federal, and successful version of what the state-level amendment sought to do. Its ratification has been described as the second most dramatic state ratification of the amendment, second to Tennessee's ratification.

On February 27, 1920, Democratic Gov. John Cornwell called a special session for the Republican legislature. The State House agreed to it by seven votes, but the State Senate tied in a 14 to 14 vote, meaning the ratification would fail. However, a telegram from State Sen. Jesse A. Bloch then arrived; Bloch, who was in California, sent the following message: "Just received notice of special session. Am in favor of ratification." State leader Harriet B. Jones said that Bloch's telegram "was refused by the opponents with jeers," but that State Sen. Bloch "agreed to make a race across the continent."

The women had difficulty keeping the vote together and the House from reconsidering, as the politicians were annoyed by the delay. Once Bloch had reached Chicago, opponents of the amendment attempted to reinstate State Sen. A.R. Montgomery who had resigned from the Senate eight months prior. Both Gov. John Cornwell and President of the West Virginia Senate Charles Sinsel rejected Montgomery's suggestions. President Sinsel quickly ruled that he was not a legislator of the Senate. The ruling was appealed, which resulted in a tie vote, so Montgomery was sustained and the situation was referred to the Committee on Privileges and Elections.

On March 10, State Sen. Bloch made his return, receiving cheers. Following this, an eventful debate over whether to reseat Montgomery was sparked; the State Senate ultimately decided to not seat him. Bloch's vote changed the vote to 15 to 14, and seeing that his vote was losing, a senator who originally cast his vote in opposition decided to change his vote, making the final vote 16 to 13. West Virginia was the 34th of the 36 states needed for ratification.

== See also ==
- 1915 Pennsylvania Amendment 1
