= Harry J. Capehart =

American lawyer, politician, and businessperson (1881–1955)

Honorable Harry J. Capehart
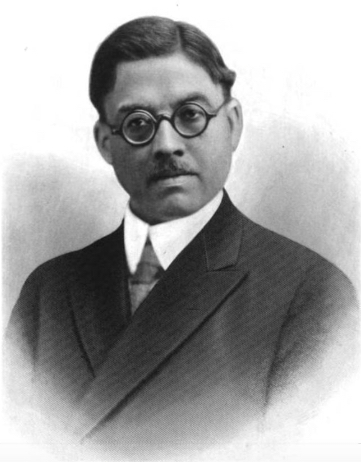
- Portrait of Capehart, published in 1923

Member of the West Virginia House of Delegates from McDowell County
- In office 1919–1925 Serving with: Luther C. Anderson (1919–1921); Clarence C. Hale (1919–1921); William J. McClaren (1919–1921); E. W. Cullen (1921–1923); J. A. Strother (1921–1925); H. L. Tutwiler (1921–1923); W. E. Eubank (1923–1925); McGinnis Hatfield (1923–1925)
- Preceded by: Harvey Hagerman; E. H. Harper; Buell Swope; Robert F. Waldron
- Succeeded by: Brooks F. Beavers; E. W. Cullen; E. Howard Harper; Simon Solins

Member of the Howard University Board of Trustees
- In office 1943–1952

Personal details
- Born: May 2, 1881 Charleston, West Virginia, U.S.
- Died: May 15, 1955 (aged 74) Bluefield, West Virginia, U.S.
- Resting place: Oak Grove Cemetery, Bluewell, West Virginia, U.S.
- Party: Republican
- Spouse: Anna Livingstone Hurley Capehart
- Children: Harry Jheopart Capehart Jr.; Arthur Froe Capehart
- Parents: Joseph Capehart (father); Maggie Woodyard Capehart (mother)
- Education: Fairview Normal College; Howard University School of Law
- Profession: Lawyer, politician, and businessperson

Harry Jheopart Capehart Sr. (May 2, 1881 – May 15, 1955) was an American lawyer, politician, and businessperson in the U.S. state of West Virginia. Capehart served as a member of the West Virginia House of Delegates, representing McDowell County for three consecutive terms, from 1919 to 1925. He also served as an assessor, city councilperson, and city attorney for Keystone, West Virginia.

Capehart was born in 1881 in Charleston, West Virginia. He was educated in Charleston's public schools, attended Fairview Normal College in Proctorville, Ohio, and earned his Bachelor of Laws degree (LL.B.) with honors from Howard University School of Law in 1913. Within one week of his graduation from Howard, Capehart was admitted to practice law before the Supreme Court of Appeals of West Virginia. The same year, he opened a law office in Keystone.

Capehart was active in the West Virginia Republican Party and became a party leader in McDowell County. After serving as Keystone's city assessor and as a city councilperson, Capehart was elected to three consecutive terms in the West Virginia House of Delegates representing McDowell County. As a house member, Capehart accomplished several significant legislative achievements. In 1919, he introduced House Bill (H.B.) 15, which established a state institution for West Virginia's African-American deaf and blind students under the management of the state's Board of Control. And in 1921, Capehart introduced H.B. 270, which established penalties for lynchings and became known as the Capehart Anti-Lynch Law.

Following his tenure in the West Virginia House of Delegates, Capehart was appointed an Assistant United States Attorney for the Southern District of West Virginia in 1932, and in 1934, he was appointed a conciliation commissioner for the Farm Credit Administration during the Great Depression. Capehart continued to be active in the Republican Party at the national, state, and local levels. He served as the director of the Colored Division of the West Virginia Republican Party Headquarters, and he chaired the Republican National Committee (RNC) Eastern Colored Division Planning Board for the Wendell Willkie campaign leading up to the 1940 United States presidential election. In 1937, the National Bar Association appointed Capehart as its regional director for Virginia and West Virginia. He died in 1955 in Bluefield, West Virginia.

== Early life and education ==
Harry Jheopart Capehart was born in Charleston, West Virginia, on May 2, 1881, the son of merchant Joseph Capehart and his wife Maggie Woodyard Capehart. Capehart's maternal grandparents had been enslaved people in North Carolina; they were manumitted prior to the Emancipation Proclamation and provided with farmland in present-day Logan County, West Virginia, where they engaged in farming and logging.

Capehart received his early education in Charleston's public schools. He then graduated from Fairview Normal College in Proctorville, Ohio, in 1901. However, Capehart was forced to delay further post-secondary education to earn money to assist his widowed mother in raising his four siblings. Before attending law school, he worked as a tailor, merchant, and schoolteacher. Capehart matriculated at Howard University School of Law, where he earned his Bachelor of Laws degree (LL.B.), graduating with the highest honors in 1913.

== Law and business careers ==
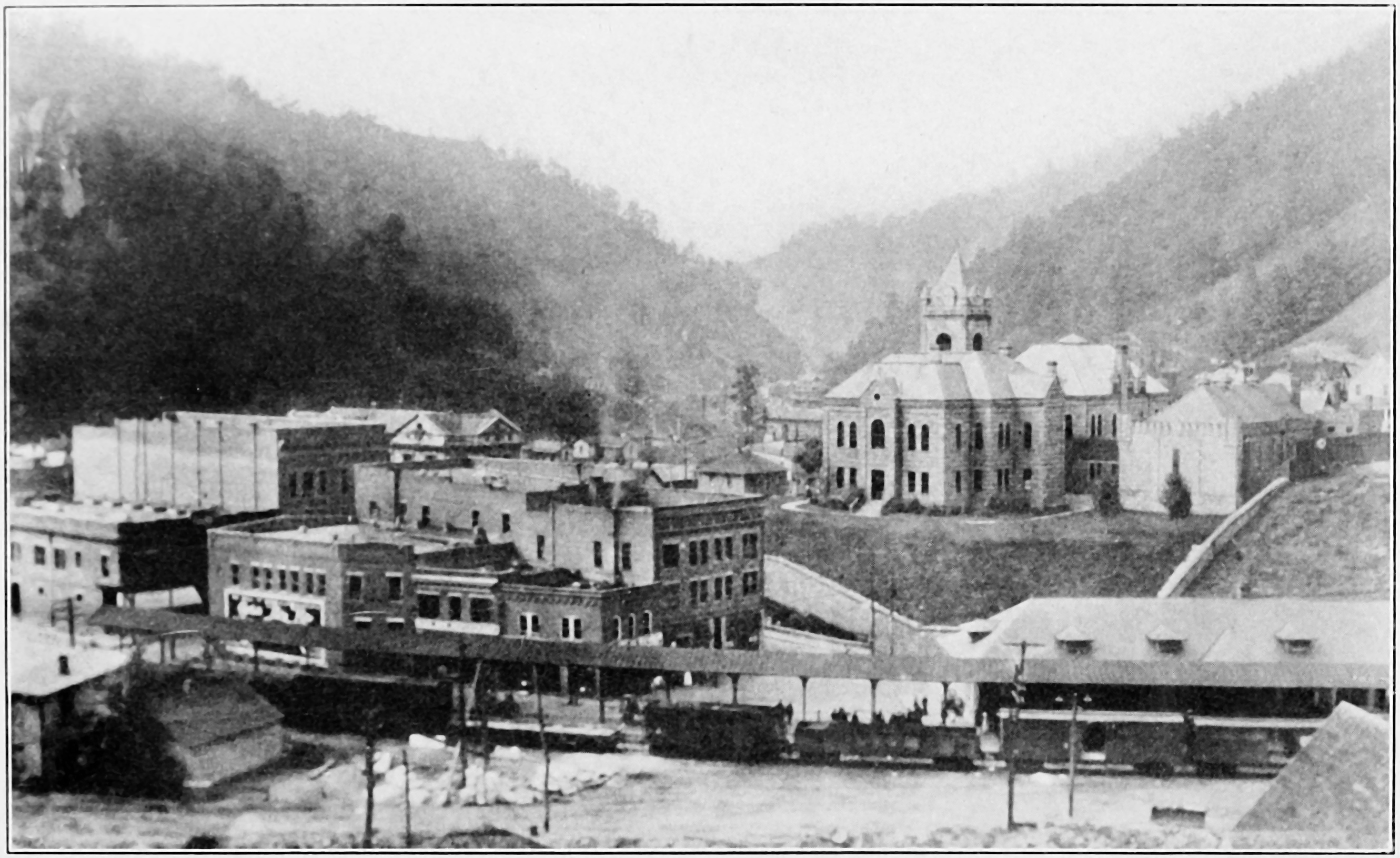
Downtown Welch, 1915

Within a week of graduating from Howard, Capehart was admitted to practice law before the Supreme Court of Appeals of West Virginia. He argued his first case before the State Supreme Court a year later in 1914. In 1913, Capehart began practicing law and established a successful law office in Keystone. He was one of only 23 African-American lawyers in West Virginia by 1920, and one of only 20 by 1930. He relocated from Keystone to Welch, West Virginia, in the 1920s. In Welch, Capehart established the law firm Froe and Capehart with Recorder of Deeds for the District of Columbia, Arthur G. Froe. By 1930, Leon P. Miller, assistant prosecuting attorney for McDowell County, joined Froe and Capehart, forming Froe, Capehart, and Miller, and by 1937, Capehart was the senior partner of the firm, which had become Capehart and Miller. His son, Harry J. Capehart Jr., joined the firm, after which it became known as Capehart, Miller, and Capehart. Throughout his entire career in law, Capehart's services were highly sought after by both African-American and white clients.

After five years of practicing law, in 1918 Capehart became active in the real estate industry. By 1923, he had developed a successful real estate business with offices in both Welch and Bluefield, West Virginia.

== Political career ==
=== Municipal offices ===
Capehart was active in the West Virginia Republican Party and he became a party leader in McDowell County. Both he and his law partner, Froe, were also well-connected in national Republican circles. According to historian Arthur Bunyan Caldwell, Capehart was a natural political leader because he possessed executive abilities and leadership qualities and was a "fluent and forceful speaker". Capehart began his political career with his election as the city assessor for Keystone, serving two terms. He was elected a member of Keystone's City Council in 1917. Following his election to the West Virginia House of Delegates in 1918, Capehart resigned his seat on the Keystone City Council. However, he later returned to municipal office as Keystone's city attorney in 1921.

=== West Virginia House of Delegates ===
In August 1918, Capehart was one of three African-American men (along with T. Gillis Nutter and John V. Coleman) nominated in the West Virginia Republican Party primary to run for seats in the West Virginia House of Delegates—at that time, the largest number of African-American candidates to run for house seats in an election. Capehart ran as one of four Republican candidates for four seats representing McDowell County in the house. On November 6, he came in fourth out of six candidates with 4,388 votes—2,232 more votes than the best-performing Democratic challenger—and won election to McDowell's fourth seat in the house. Capehart was elected and represented McDowell County alongside fellow Republicans Luther C. Anderson, Clarence C. Hale, and William J. McClaren. Capehart's first house term occurred during the Thirty-Fourth West Virginia Legislature from January 8, 1919, to March 11, 1920.

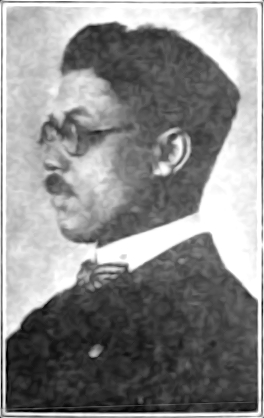
Capehart's portrait in the West Virginia Legislative Hand Book (1920)

Capehart was reelected to the house representing McDowell County in 1920, coming in fourth out of the four Republicans running with 10,929 votes—5,674 votes more than the best-performing Democratic challenger. He was elected along with Republicans E. W. Cullen, J. A. Strother, and H. L. Tutwiler. Capehart served in the Thirty-Fifth West Virginia Legislature from 1921 until 1923. He was reelected for his third and final consecutive two-year term in 1922 and served alongside W. E. Eubank, McGinnis Hatfield, and J. A. Strother in the Thirty-Sixth West Virginia Legislature from 1923 to 1925.

==== Legislative achievements ====
Capehart was assigned to several house standing committees, including: Claims and Grievances, Corporations, Education, Executive Offices and Library, Humane Institutions and Public Buildings, Railroads, and Taxation and Finance.

During his three terms in the house, Capehart accomplished several significant legislative achievements. During the 1919 regular session, Capehart introduced and sponsored H.B. 15, his first bill passed by the West Virginia Legislature, as an act that established a state institution for West Virginia's African-American deaf and blind students under the management of the state's Board of Control. This act led to the creation of the West Virginia Schools for the Colored Deaf and Blind.

In the 1921 legislative session, Capehart introduced and sponsored H.B. 270 (Chapter 96), which established penalties for lynchings, and steered the bill through its final passage into law by the West Virginia Legislature. To garner the support of his Republican colleagues to pass the bill, Capehart had to modify its more severe provisions. The bill declared that lynching by mobs constituted murder and that counties where this crime occurred were subject to forfeiture of $5,000, to be recovered in the name of the personal representative of the person put to death. The law became known as the Capehart Anti-Lynch Law. Historian Arthur Bunyan Caldwell assessed the Capehart Anti-Lynch Law as "the most progressive piece of legislation" that had been enacted as part of the anti-lynching movement. Capehart also introduced and sponsored a bill that became a law preventing the exhibition of images that stereotype or humiliate a particular race.

=== Federal service ===
In August 1932, Capehart was appointed Assistant United States Attorney for the Southern District of West Virginia under the District's U.S. Attorney, D. D. Ashworth. According to Ashworth, Capehart was the first African-American to be appointed to this position in West Virginia; however, Capehart and other African-American attorneys had assisted U.S. Attorneys in West Virginia on an ad hoc basis previously. Ashworth said he appointed an African-American as his Assistant U.S. Attorney because he recognized that African-Americans made up one-fifth of the Southern District's population, and he preferred the assistance of an African-American attorney in cases involving African-Americans. In September 1934, Southern District of West Virginia Judge George Warwick McClintic appointed Capehart as a conciliation commissioner to appraise farmers' properties for the Farm Credit Administration in agricultural and bankruptcy proceedings in McDowell County during the Great Depression.

=== Later political activities ===
By 1939, Capehart served on a state committee on employment. He also continued to play an active role in the Republican Party at the national, state, and local levels. In May 1939, he was the principal African-American speaker at the West Virginia Republican Party's general meeting in Charleston. He served as the director of the Colored Division of the West Virginia Republican Party Headquarters. In September 1940, Capehart convened an assembly in Charleston, where African-American Republican leaders from ten counties drafted a resolution petitioning the party's state chairpersons to appoint African-Americans to positions at their respective regional party headquarters, and to provide African-American representation on election boards for precincts with large African-American populations. Capehart also served as a chairperson for the Eastern Colored Division Planning Board of the Republican National Committee (RNC) for the Wendell Willkie campaign leading up to the 1940 United States presidential election. He convened a conference of the Eastern Colored Division Planning Board in New York on October 1, 1940, and then participated in a combined meeting of the RNC's Western and Eastern Colored Division Planning Boards in Chicago.

== Personal life ==
=== Marriage and family ===
Capehart married Anna Livingstone Hurley, daughter of Warner and Marie Hurley of Washington, D.C., on November 28, 1917. Educated in Washington, Anna was a teacher prior to their marriage. They had two children together:

- Harry Jheopart Capehart Jr., married on June 15, 1949, in Welch to Marian Elaine Jones of Welch
- Arthur Froe Capehart

=== Organizational affiliations ===
A member of the Baptist church, Capehart was also a member of several fraternal organizations, including the Golden Rule Benevolent Association, the Odd Fellows, and the United Brethren of Friends. He was a member of the Negro Bar Association of West Virginia following its establishment in 1918, and in 1919, he delivered a presentation on "The Lawyer's Place in Reconstruction" at the association's first annual meeting in Huntington. In 1937, Capehart was elected vice president of the association, then known as the Mountain State Bar Association. He was also a member of the National Bar Association (NBA), and in December 1937, he was appointed the association's regional director for Virginia and West Virginia. By 1938, Capehart was a member of the McDowell County Civic League and served as chairperson for the league's program committee. In 1940, he attended the NBA's annual meeting in Columbus, Ohio, and delivered a presentation entitled "Whose National Labor Relations Act?" regarding the National Labor Relations Act of 1935. Capehart was an active member of the National Association for the Advancement of Colored People (NAACP).

=== Other personal interests ===
Capehart's favorite written works consisted of the Bible, and the works of William Blackstone, Ralph Waldo Emerson, Johann Wolfgang von Goethe, and Leo Tolstoy.

== Later life and death ==
In July 1942, Capehart delivered some remarks at the formal dedication of the West Virginia State Negro 4-H Camp at the Camp Washington-Carver Complex near Clifftop. He was a principal commencement speaker at the May 1943 graduation ceremony at North Carolina A&T State College. In 1943, Capehart was elected a member of Howard University's Board of Trustees, and he was reelected in April 1950, serving as a trustee until 1952.

Capehart continued practicing law almost until his death. In his final major case, he defended Melvin Loveless during his murder trial and appeals against execution. Capehart died on May 15, 1955, at St. Mary's Hospital in Bluefield following a brief illness. At the time of his death, Capehart resided at 14 Virginia Avenue in Welch. He died from an internal hemorrhage caused by an abdominal aneurysm and arteriosclerosis. Capehart's funeral was held at the Virginia Avenue Methodist Church in Welch on May 19, 1955. He was interred at Oak Grove Cemetery in Bluewell, West Virginia, that same day.

== Legacy ==
In Arthur Bunyan Caldwell's West Virginia Edition of the History of the American Negro (1923), Caldwell described Capehart as "a successful lawyer and business man" and credited him as being one of the foremost leaders in championing West Virginia's "constructive and progressive legislation relating to racial matters". Caldwell added that Capehart was "a careful student of conditions" and that he believed, "the permanent progress of the race must rest on education and an enlarged activity in commercial and industrial endeavors".

In February 2005, the West Virginia Human Rights Commission honored Capehart posthumously at their West Virginia Human Rights Day observance at the Charleston Job Corps Center.

== Bibliography ==
- Caldwell, Arthur Bunyan, ed. (1923). History of the American Negro. Vol. VII (West Virginia ed.). Atlanta: A. B. Caldwell Publishing Company. OCLC 1039670577 – via Google Books.
- Harris, John T., ed. (1920). West Virginia Legislative Hand Book and Manual and Official Register. Charleston, West Virginia: The Tribune Printing Company. OCLC 643874972. Archived from the original on August 31, 2020 – via Google Books.
- Harris, John T., ed. (1921). Official Register Division of the West Virginia Legislative Hand Book and Manual. Charleston, West Virginia: The Tribune Printing Company. OCLC 643874972. Archived from the original on March 8, 2017 – via Google Books.
- Logan, Rayford W. (1969). Howard University The First Hundred Years 1867–1967. New York: New York University Press, Issued Under the Auspices of Howard University. OCLC 591015481 – via Internet Archive.
- Low, W. Augustus; Clift, Virgil A. (1981). Encyclopedia of Black America. New York: McGraw-Hill. ISBN 030680221X. OCLC 904210733 – via Internet Archive.
- Smith, J. Clay Jr. (1993). Emancipation: The Making of the Black Lawyer 1844–1944. Philadelphia: University of Pennsylvania Press. ISBN 9780812216851. OCLC 491962363 – via Internet Archive.
- West Virginia Human Rights Commission (February 24, 2005). From Whence We Came: Meet Our Honorees – West Virginia Civil Rights Day (PDF). Institute, West Virginia: West Virginia State University Printing Services. Archived (PDF) from the original on December 30, 2016.
- West Virginia Collegiate Institute (January 1919). "Three Members of Race in W. Va. Legislature" (PDF). The Institute Monthly. 11 (3). Institute, West Virginia: West Virginia Collegiate Institute: 3–4. Archived (PDF) from the original on October 6, 2015 – via Drain-Jordan Library, West Virginia State University.
- Yenser, Thomas, ed. (1942). Who's Who in Colored America: A Biographical Dictionary of Notable Living Persons of African Descent in America (Sixth ed.). New York: Thomas Yenser – via Google Books.

West Virginia House of Delegates
Preceded by Harvey Hagerman; E. Howard Harper; J. Buell Swope; Robert F. Waldron	Member of the West Virginia House of Delegates from McDowell County; 1919–1925; Served alongside: Luther C. Anderson (1919–1921); Clarence C. Hale (1919–1921); William J. McClaren (1919–1921); E. W. Cullen (1921–1923); J. A. Strother (1921–1925); H. L. Tutwiler (1921–1923); W. E. Eubank (1923–1925); McGinnis Hatfield (1923–1925)	Succeeded by Brooks F. Beavers; E. W. Cullen; E. Howard Harper; Simon Solins
