= Bureau of Negro Welfare and Statistics =

West Virginia government agency for African Americans

The Bureau of Negro Welfare and Statistics was a state government agency in West Virginia. Tyler Edward Hill was its first director. G. E. Ferguson (Gurnett Edinburgh Ferguson) (1888–1982) also served as its director.

It published a report in 1922 and 1925. In 1934 it published a Survey of Negro Housing in Charleston. In 1935 and 1938 it published Negro housing survey of Charleston, Keyston, Kimball, Wheeling and Williamson. It produced a 1951-1952 Biennial Report.

In 2015, the article "The Rise and Fall of West Virginia's Bureau of Negro Welfare and Statistics, 1921-1957" by Colin E. Reynolds was published in West Virginia History.

== See also ==
Angie Turner King
