= Leon P. Miller =

American lawyer, politician, and judge (1899–1980)

Leon Parker Miller
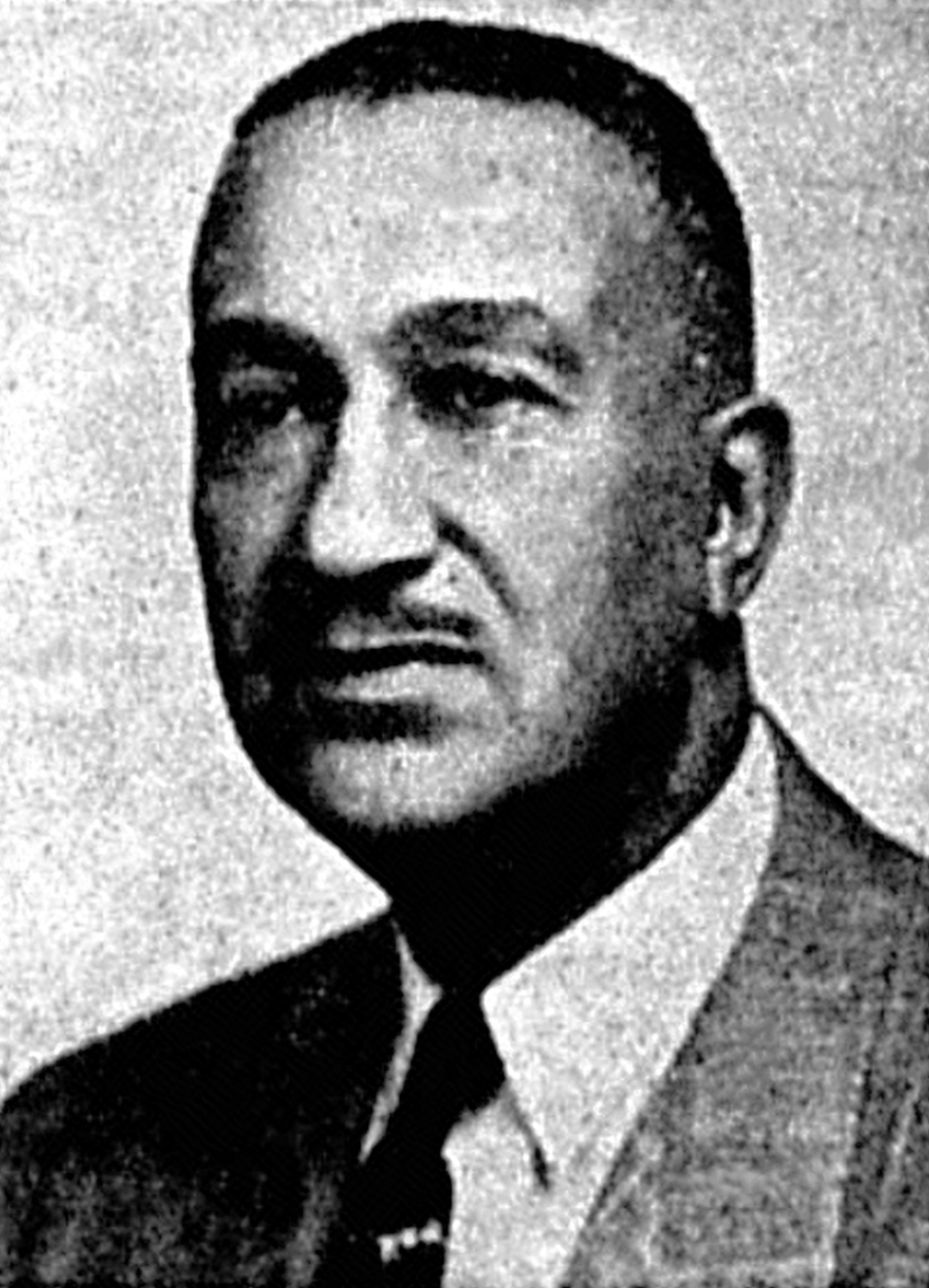
- Portrait of Miller, published in the St. Paul Recorder, 1954

Judge of the Criminal Court of McDowell County, West Virginia (Note: The name of the Criminal Court of McDowell County was changed to the Intermediate Court of McDowell County following an act of the West Virginia Legislature in 1971.)
- In office 1968–1968
- Preceded by: L. R. Morgan
- Succeeded by: Harry G. Camper
- In office 1968–1972
- Preceded by: Harry G. Camper
- Succeeded by: Rudolph J. Murensky

United States Attorney for the District of the Virgin Islands
- In office 1954–1962
- President: Dwight D. Eisenhower; John F. Kennedy
- Preceded by: Cyril Michael
- Succeeded by: Almeric L. Christian

Member of the City Council of Welch, West Virginia
- In office 1944–1948
- Preceded by: William Gannaway
- Succeeded by: Joseph G. Travis

Assistant Prosecuting Attorney for McDowell County, West Virginia
- In office 1928–1936
- Succeeded by: Joseph G. Travis

Personal details
- Born: April 27, 1899 Knoxville, Tennessee, U.S.
- Died: February 4, 1980 (aged 80) Welch, West Virginia, U.S.
- Resting place: Restlawn Memorial Gardens, Bluefield, West Virginia, U.S.
- Party: Republican
- Spouse: Mildred Elizabeth Foster Miller
- Children: 3
- Education: North Carolina A&T State College; University of Pennsylvania Law School (LL.B.)
- Profession: Lawyer, politician, and judge

Leon Parker Miller (April 27, 1899 – February 4, 1980) was an American lawyer, politician, and judge, in the U.S. state of West Virginia. Miller served as U.S. Attorney for the District of the Virgin Islands from 1954 to 1962. He was appointed the first African-American judge in West Virginia in April 1968, and became the state's first elected African-American judge in November 1968.

Born in Knoxville, Tennessee, in 1899, Miller was raised in Roanoke, Virginia. He attended North Carolina A&T State College, and in 1922, he graduated from University of Pennsylvania Law School with a Bachelor of Laws. Miller commenced his career in law in Williamson, West Virginia, in 1922, and in 1924, he relocated to Welch, West Virginia, and established a law firm with former West Virginia House of Delegates member Harry J. Capehart and Recorder of Deeds for the District of Columbia, Arthur G. Froe. He served as assistant prosecuting attorney for McDowell County from 1928 to 1936, and as a member of the Welch city council from 1944 to 1948.

Miller was appointed by President Dwight D. Eisenhower as the United States Attorney for the District of the Virgin Islands in 1954, and he was reappointed to the position in 1958. He served as U.S. attorney until 1962, and then returned to his law practice in Welch. In 1968, he was elected as a write-in candidate as judge of the criminal court, becoming the first elected African-American judge in West Virginia, and the first Republican elected to major office in McDowell County since the 1930s. He retired from the bench in 1972 and continued the practice of law until his death in Welch in 1980.

== Early life and education ==
Leon Parker Miller was born on April 27, 1899, in Knoxville, Tennessee. He had three sisters: Georgia, Eunice, and Grace. Miller was raised in Roanoke, Virginia, where he attended school. The first job Miller held as a child was of a shoeshiner. He began attending college at the age of 14, and paid his tuition by working as a waiter and bellhop. Miller attended North Carolina A&T State College in Greensboro, North Carolina. While attending North Carolina A&T, Miller was a member of the college's Mechanic Arts Society, and he delivered an oration at the society's anniversary exercises in May 1918. He then attended the University of Pennsylvania Law School, where he received a Bachelor of Laws degree in 1922.

== Early law and political careers ==
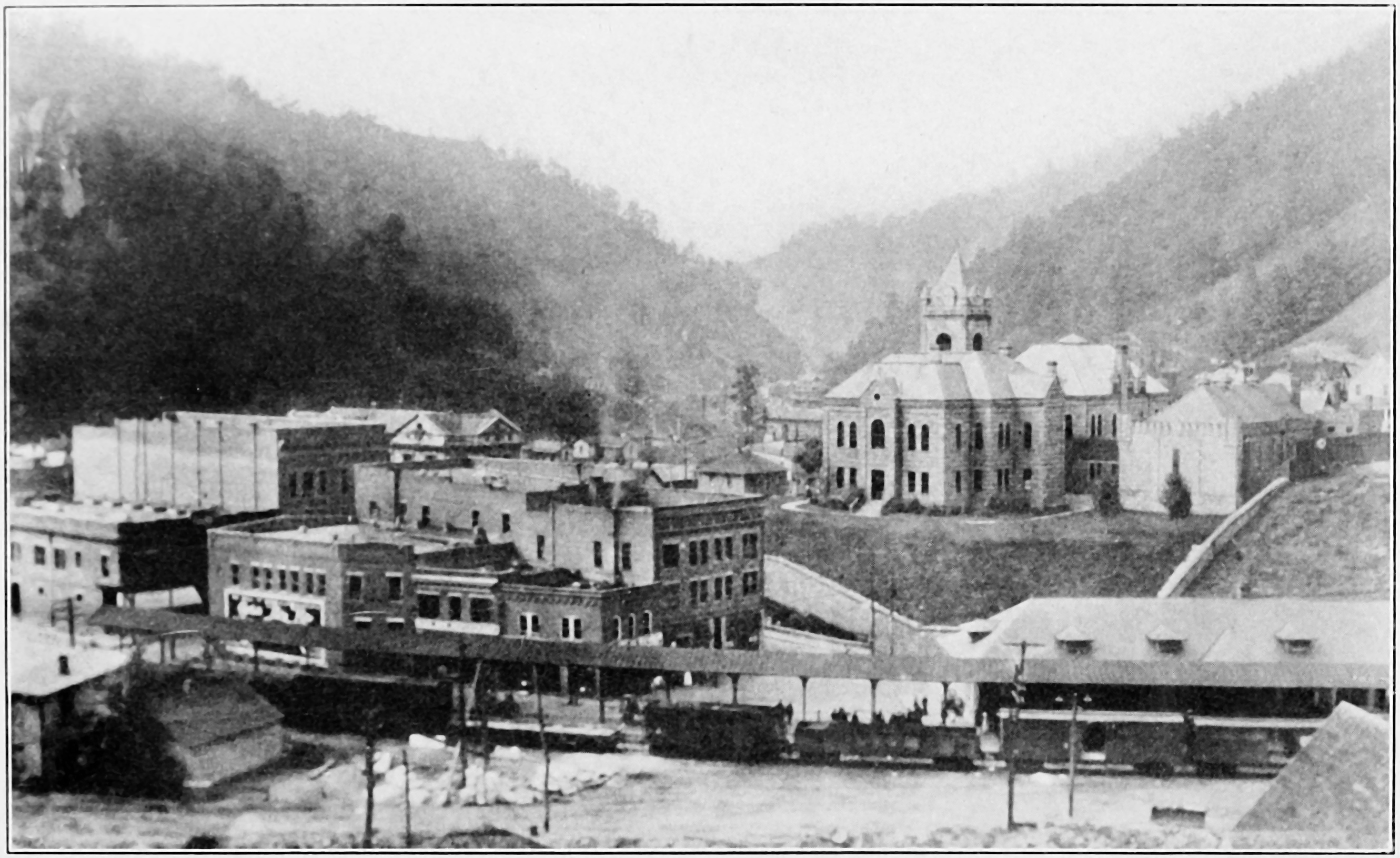
Downtown Welch, 1915

Miller commenced his career in law in 1922 in Williamson, West Virginia, where he remained for two years. In 1924, he relocated to Welch, West Virginia. Miller became a law partner of former West Virginia House of Delegates member Harry J. Capehart and Recorder of Deeds for the District of Columbia, Arthur G. Froe, and they had a successful law practice together known as Froe, Capehart, and Miller. Following the death of Froe in 1932, he and Capehart continued their practice under the name of Capehart and Miller. From 1928 to 1936, Miller served as an assistant prosecuting attorney for McDowell County. He had been appointed to the position following a recommendation from county prosecuting attorney, Wilson Anderson. According to the Charleston Daily Mail in 1932, Miller was believed to be the only African-American assistant prosecuting attorney in the state. He resigned from the position effective June 1, 1936, to return to private practice, and he was succeeded by African-American attorney Joseph G. Travis. In 1934, Miller campaigned for the Republican nomination for a seat on the McDowell County board of education, and in August of that year, he was elected as the Republican candidate for the board. In October 1934, Miller was named chairman of the McDowell County Colored Republican Organization advisory committee. He also served as a member of the Welch city council from 1944 to 1948. (Note: According to the West Virginia Blue Book, Miller served on the Welch city council in 1944, 1945, 1946, 1947, and 1948.)

Miller was a contributor to various periodicals to include The Crisis and Opportunity: A Journal of Negro Life. In his 1935 article, "The Negro and the 'Closed Shop'", Miller wrote about African-American strikebreakers and the discrimination against African-American workers by organized labor. In his 1936 article, "A Greater N.A.A.C.P.", Miller discussed the need for the NAACP to play an expanded, centralized role in organizing and improving the lives of African-Americans. In March 1941, Miller was a guest speaker on the CBS national radio program, Wings Over Jordan, in commemoration of the 50th anniversary of the North Carolina A&T State College.

By 1938, Miller was the president of the McDowell County branch of the NAACP, in which capacity, he and the county NAACP sought to retain the African-American Civilian Conservation Corps camp in the county's Big Creek district. Miller also later served on the West Virginia Bar Association legal ethics committee for West Virginia's 5th congressional district in 1947. Miller served as the assistant committee chairperson for arrangements for the 1948 Republican National Convention in Philadelphia. In addition, he was an alternate delegate representing the 5th congressional district at the 1952 Republican National Convention in Chicago.

== United States attorney ==
In 1954, President Dwight D. Eisenhower appointed Miller to a four-year term as the United States Attorney for the District of the Virgin Islands to replace Cyril Michael. Miller's appointment was referred to the United States Senate Committee on the Judiciary on November 8, 1954, his appointment was reported by the committee on December 1, and he was confirmed by the U.S. Senate on December 2. When Miller arrived on Saint Thomas, Virgin Islands District Court Judge Herman E. Moore had not yet been notified of Miller's appointment. Miller was sworn in following the judge's receipt of a telegram confirming Miller's appointment. During his tenure, Miller was involved with the codification of the U.S. Virgin Islands' laws. Eisenhower reappointed Miller to another four-year term as U.S. attorney in 1958, and he was confirmed by the U.S. Senate on August 22, 1958. In 1961, at the end of Miller's term, the position of the Attorney General of the United States Virgin Islands was created, which relieved the office of the U.S. Attorney from trying all cases within the territorial boundaries of the U.S. Virgin Islands. In total, Miller held that post for eight years until 1962. President John F. Kennedy appointed Almeric L. Christian to succeed Miller.

== Judicial and later law career ==
Following his tenure as a U.S. attorney, Miller returned to Welch and resumed the practice of law. In August 1962, Miller addressed approximately 2,200 delegates of the state's Republican convention at the Charleston Civic Center. Miller's speech was praised by columnists in the Beckley Post-Herald and the Charleston Daily Mail. In his speech, he noted that while he believed the Republican Party had something to offer all groups, he warned the party against making separate appeals to different groups and to prejudices.

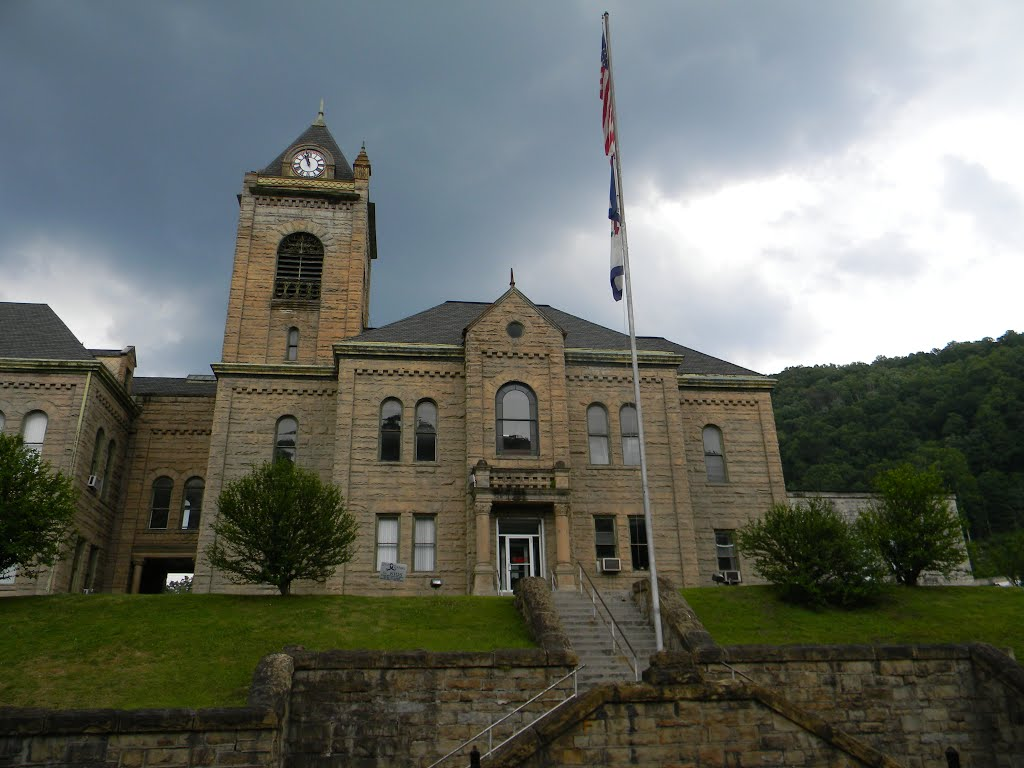
McDowell County Courthouse, Welch

In March 1968, McDowell County Criminal Court judge L. R. Morgan died, causing a vacancy on the bench. On April 9, 1968, Miller was elected and appointed by the McDowell County Bar Association to serve as special judge of the criminal court for the April term until Governor Hulett C. Smith appointed Morgan's successor. Governor Smith subsequently appointed Harry G. Camper to replace Morgan until a permanent replacement for the remainder of Morgan's term could be elected in the 1968 election in November 1968. Neither the Democratic or Republican parties held primary elections for nominees to the seat, and therefore, neither party entered a candidate for the November ballot. A write-in campaign was then organized for Miller and Beediah Hassan, and stickers for both candidates were disseminated to voters on the day of the election—November 5, 1968. Miller was subsequently elected judge of the McDowell County Criminal Court in the 1968 election. Miller initially received a total of 1,317 write-in votes and 1,197 "sticker votes". (Note: A sticker vote is a sticker affixed to a ballot with a candidate's name and office printed on it.) His election was certified in November, and on December 12, 1968, Governor Smith proclaimed Miller as the duly elected judge of the criminal court, with a total of 2,526 votes. Miller became the first African-American judge elected in West Virginia. He also became the first Republican elected to a major office in McDowell County since the 1930s.

Miller viewed his election as both a step forward for African-American West Virginians and as a tribute to McDowell County. Regarding his election, he stated:

I think it's helpful to the younger people of the state to know that they have an opportunity, if they strive hard enough, to achieve things that a few years ago that were unthinkable. I've been here in the county about 44 years now, and it's a very gratifying thing for me to know that my neighbors, friends, and people of this community have sufficient confidence in me to elect me to this very important position.

On November 18, 1968, Miller sat for his first hearing, in which he ordered a psychiatric examination of a 17-year old arrested on felonious assault charges, the results of which were to be used as part of his bond hearing.

In 1971, an act of the West Virginia Legislature changed the name of the Criminal Court of McDowell County to the Intermediate Court of McDowell County. Miller fulfilled the remainder of Morgan's six-year term, which ended on December 31, 1972. In November 1972, he announced he would not run for reelection, and he retired from the bench at the end of his term in December. Following his retirement, Miller took a six-month vacation in the U.S. Virgin Islands, where he formerly served as U.S. attorney. Miller was succeeded on the bench of the intermediate court by Democrat Rudolph J. Murensky.

While reflecting on his tenure on the bench, Miller remarked that he was sometimes criticized for being too lenient. He explained, "But when I see a young man who has stolen something on a lark when he was half drunk, I can't help thinking that there are men in Charleston who have stolen millions and are walking around free." Miller further stated that he preferred probation for offenders in most cases, with the exception of when the crime is serious enough or if the criminal is a repeat offender.

== Personal life ==
Miller married Mildred Elizabeth Foster of Greensboro, North Carolina. While in Welch, he and his family resided on Court Street. Miller and his wife had three daughters: Artrelle Miller Wheatley, who worked for the Ford Foundation; Jane Miller Johnson, a psychiatric social worker at Presbyterian Hospital; and Lydia Patricia Miller Adams, a physical therapist who operated the U.S. Virgin Islands' disabled children's division. Miller and his wife had five grandchildren.

Miller was an active speaker and leader in the community, and he regularly delivered addresses at events. In November 1932, Miller and Memphis Tennessee Garrison were speakers at an event in Bluestone on the importance of voting in the upcoming 1932 elections. In May 1933, he gave the main address for the graduation commencement ceremony at Northfork Colored High School in Northfork. In February 1936, Miller delivered an address on "Race Planning" at Bluefield State College in Bluefield. In May 1949, Miller delivered the main address at the Conley High School graduation in Mullens. In March 1969, he gave a presentation on "Law and Order" at Mullens High School in which he stated, "Our greatest asset is our young people." He further told the students, "The youth of today are courageous, determined, and admirable." In addition, Miller was a member of the Alpha Phi Alpha fraternity.

== Later life and death ==
Following a long illness, Miller was declared dead on arrival at a hospital in Welch on February 4, 1980. At his funeral service, Miller's successor on the intermediate court bench, Rudolph Murensky, remarked of Miller, "He was one of the most outstanding lawyers to ever practice in this area. No one had greater compassion."

== Selected works ==
- "The Negro and the 'Closed Shop'". Opportunity: A Journal of Negro Life. XIII (6). New York City, New York: National Urban League: 168–170, 189. June 1935.
- "A Greater N.A.A.C.P." The Crisis. 43 (7). New York City, New York: Crisis Publishing Company, Inc.: 213–214 July 1936.

== Bibliography ==
- Bailey, L. W., ed. (1955). Civilian Nominations. Washington, D.C.: United States Government Printing Office – via the Internet Archive.
- Carson, Howard W., ed. (1973). West Virginia Blue Book (PDF). Charleston, West Virginia. ISSN 0364-7323. OCLC 1012082243. Archived (PDF) from the original on April 23, 2021.
- Harris, John T., ed. (1927). "West Virginia Legislative Hand Book and Manual and Official Register" (PDF). West Virginia Blue Book. Charleston, West Virginia: The Tribune Printing Company. ISSN 0364-7323. OCLC 1012082243. Archived (PDF) from the original on April 27, 2021.
- Miller, Leon P. (June 1935). "The Negro and the 'Closed Shop'". Opportunity: A Journal of Negro Life. XIII (6). New York City, New York: National Urban League: 168–170, 189 – via Internet Archive.
- Miller, Leon P. (July 1936). "A Greater N.A.A.C.P." The Crisis. 43 (7). New York City, New York: Crisis Publishing Company, Inc.: 213–214 – via Internet Archive.
- Myers, J. Howard, ed. (1945). West Virginia Blue Book (PDF). Charleston, West Virginia: Jarrett Printing Company. ISSN 0364-7323. OCLC 1012082243. Archived (PDF) from the original on October 20, 2021.
- Myers, J. Howard, ed. (1946). West Virginia Blue Book (PDF). Charleston, West Virginia: Jarrett Printing Company. ISSN 0364-7323. OCLC 1012082243. Archived (PDF) from the original on April 23, 2021.
- Myers, J. Howard, ed. (1947). West Virginia Blue Book (PDF). Charleston, West Virginia: Jarrett Printing Company. ISSN 0364-7323. OCLC 1012082243. Archived (PDF) from the original on April 27, 2021.
- Myers, J. Howard, ed. (1948). West Virginia Blue Book (PDF). Charleston, West Virginia: Jarrett Printing Company. ISSN 0364-7323. OCLC 1012082243. Archived (PDF) from the original on April 23, 2021.
- Myers, J. Howard, ed. (1968). West Virginia Blue Book (PDF). Charleston, West Virginia: Jarrett Printing Company. ISSN 0364-7323. OCLC 1012082243. Archived (PDF) from the original on September 15, 2021.
- Myers, J. Howard, ed. (1969). West Virginia Blue Book (PDF). Charleston, West Virginia: Jarrett Printing Company. ISSN 0364-7323. OCLC 1012082243. Archived (PDF) from the original on October 20, 2021.
- Myers, J. Howard, ed. (1970). West Virginia Blue Book (PDF). Charleston, West Virginia: Jarrett Printing Company. ISSN 0364-7323. OCLC 1012082243. Archived (PDF) from the original on September 15, 2021.
- Myers, J. Howard, ed. (1971). West Virginia Blue Book (PDF). Charleston, West Virginia: Jarrett Printing Company. ISSN 0364-7323. OCLC 1012082243. Archived (PDF) from the original on October 19, 2021.
- Office of the Secretary of State of West Virginia (March 2014). Candidates And Voters Guide to Write-In Filing and Voting Procedures (PDF). Charleston, West Virginia: Secretary of State of West Virginia. Archived (PDF) from the original on December 3, 2021.
- Offices of the United States Attorneys (1989). Bicentennial Celebration of the United States Attorneys. Washington, D.C.: United States Department of Justice. Archived from the original on June 6, 2021.
- Smith, J. Clay Jr. (1993). Emancipation: The Making of the Black Lawyer 1844–1944. Philadelphia, Pennsylvania: University of Pennsylvania Press. ISBN 978-0-8122-1685-1. OCLC 491962363 – via Internet Archive.
- University of Pennsylvania (1922). University of Pennsylvania Proceedings. Philadelphia, Pennsylvania: University of Pennsylvania Press – via the Internet Archive.
- Watkins, Fred B., ed. (1944). West Virginia Blue Book (PDF). Charleston, West Virginia: Jarrett Printing Company. ISSN 0364-7323. OCLC 1012082243. Archived (PDF) from the original on April 23, 2021.
- Young, Laurence T. Sr., ed. (1980). "Omega Chapter". The Sphinx. 66 (2). Chicago, Illinois: Alpha Phi Alpha: 70–73. Archived from the original on July 28, 2021 – via Issuu.

Legal offices
Preceded by L. R. Morgan	Judge of the Criminal Court of McDowell County, West Virginia; 1968 – 1968	Succeeded by Harry G. Camper
Preceded by Harry G. Camper	Judge of the Criminal Court of McDowell County, West Virginia; 1968 – 1972	Succeeded by Rudolph J. Murensky
Preceded by Cyril Michael	United States Attorney for the District of the Virgin Islands; 1954 – 1962	Succeeded by Almeric L. Christian
Political offices
Preceded by William Gannaway	Member of the City Council of Welch, West Virginia; 1944 – 1948	Succeeded by Joseph G. Travis
