= Fleming A. Jones =

US politician and lawyer

Fleming Adolphus Jones Jr. (October 10, 1895-1961) was a lawyer and politician in West Virginia. He served in the West Virginia House of Delegates. He was a Democrat. He served in the West Virginia House of Delegates from 1935 to 1943 and from 1945 to 1947.

Born in Gaffney, South Carolina, Felix and Emeline née Young Jone were his parents. He attended Fisk University. Jones lived in Welch, West Virginia. He served in the U.S. Army during World War I. A Baptist, he belonged to various fraternal organizations.

Jones served as representative for McDowell County in the West Virginia House from 1934 to 1944. He succeeded Stewart Calhoun.

He advocated for what became Camp Washington Carver, named for Booker T. Washington and George Washington Carver, then first 4-H camp for black children. It was originally called West Virginia Negro 4-H Camp.

Jones belonged to various fraternal organizations.

== See also ==
- List of African-American officeholders (1900–1959)
- Christopher Payne
