= Stewart A. Calhoun =

American Politician

Stewart Calhoun

Member of the West Virginia House of Delegates
- In office 1951–1955

Personal details
- Born: August , 1897 Keystone, West Virginia, U.S.
- Died: November 19, 1965 (aged 68) Chicago, Illinois, U.S.
- Party: Republican

Stewart A. Calhoun (1897-1965) was a lawyer, prosecutor, and politician in West Virginia. He served in the West Virginia House of Delegates in 1950 and 1952. He was a Republican.

He was born in Keystone, West Virginia. His father A. L. Calhoun ran a poolroom.

He was an Assistant Prosecuting Attorney. He was one of several African Americans to represent McDowell County in the West Virginia House of Delegates.

In February 1965, he was interviewed about his support for John F. Kennedy's presidential campaign.

== See also ==
- List of African-American officeholders (1900–1959)
- Fleming A. Jones
