= Tyler Edward Hill =

American lawyer and politician (1883–1932)

Tyler Edward Hill (April 23, 1883 - December 2, 1932), known as T. Edward Hill, was a lawyer and politician in West Virginia during the early twentieth century coal boom that led many black Americans to migrate from the South to northern coalfields.

== Early life and education ==
Hill was born on April 23, 1883, in Martinsville, Virginia, to Caroline Virginia Harris and James D. Hill. His father was a manager of the Southern Express Railroad Company. Beginning at an early age, Edward was schooled in his family's genealogical history, learning about his ancestral ties to slavery, white slave owners, and an African chief. This racially-focused family history as remembered by Hill likely inspired him to examine race at a young age.

After his father died in the late 1890s, Hill and his brothers took up work to support their family at a local tobacco factory. Hill quickly rose through the ranks to become a "prize hand" by 1900.

Hill was educated at a Presbyterian parochial school in Martinsville. After he graduated, he began studying law in Washington, D.C., at Howard University. Hill graduated and passed the bar exam in D.C. and Virginia. In 1904, he opened a café in D.C. which he ran for four years. In 1908, he sold his café and relocated to a place where his law degree would be of particular use: southern West Virginia.

== Career and politics ==
In the early twentieth century, West Virginia's black population, particularly in the south of the state, was a politically powerful. With the coal industry beckoning black southerners to move north to West Virginia for steady employment, thousands of black men and their families flocked into the coalfields during and after the war years. The large black voting population helped to influence those in political office. In this environment, Hill set up shop as a lawyer and bought a large portion of stock in The McDowell Times, an African American newspaper in Keystone, West Virginia.

Hill and his partner Matthew Thomas (“M.T.”) Whittico, who founded the McDowell Times in 1904, made the paper one of the leading black-published papers in West Virginia. Both Whittico and Hill allowed their personal politics to influence the content of the paper, regularly advancing their conservative Republican values in the paper, which developed a strong local black readership.

Through his association with the McDowell Times, Hill's growing presence among Republican organizations ensured his elections as President of the McDowell County Colored Republican Organization in 1916, Secretary of the McDowell County Republican Executive Committee, and Delegate for the Fifth Congressional District to the Republican National Convention in 1912, 1916, and 1920.

Perhaps his most influential position would arise out of Hill's election as President of the West Virginia State League (WVSL) which held a particularly powerful station in lobbying political leaders to pass legislature that benefited black people in the state. In tandem with other black activist groups such as the much larger Commission on Interracial Cooperation (CIC) that was organized in reaction to racial violence flaring up after World War I, the WVSL's mission was to address any issue related to the well-being of the entire black population of the state. It used its influential members and the power of its constituency to advocate for big bills like the Capehart Anti-Lynch bill, which was made law in 1921, and to push for the founding of the West Virginia Bureau of Negro Welfare and Statistics (BNWS), of which Hill was appointed the first Director.

== Director of the Bureau of Negro Welfare and Statistics ==
As the first director of West Virginia's Bureau of Negro Welfare and Statistics (BNWS), Hill was tasked with laying out plans for the new bureau. In an early publication, Hill described the BNWS's role saying it was

"... to study the economic condition of the Negro throughout the state… to stimulate and encourage thrift, industry and economy among Negroes and to promote the general welfare and uplift of the Negro race in this state; to promote and encourage friendly and harmonious relations between the white and Negro races, and to report to the legislature, through the governor… and to make such recommendations for the solution of any problem or problems affecting the Negro that they may deem advisable.”

Despite, and perhaps because of, the massive post-war strikes taking place in the West Virginia coal mines, Hill became a “staunch anti-union” man as the Director of the BNWS. In his first report as Director, Hill boasted about the Bureau persuading black coal miners not to join the infamous Battle of Blair Mountain and instead, making those men strikebreakers. Hill also helped to form a black separatist community in Pocahontas County, West Virginia, early in his leadership of the BNWS. The Watoga Land Association was begun to give black coal miners a chance to own land for themselves and create new lives based on subsistence farming and a network of community support in an all-black community.

Hill died from suicide after an extended illness at age 49 in Charleston, West Virginia. He was married and had a son and two daughters.
