= 1916 United States presidential election in West Virginia =

- November 7, 1916
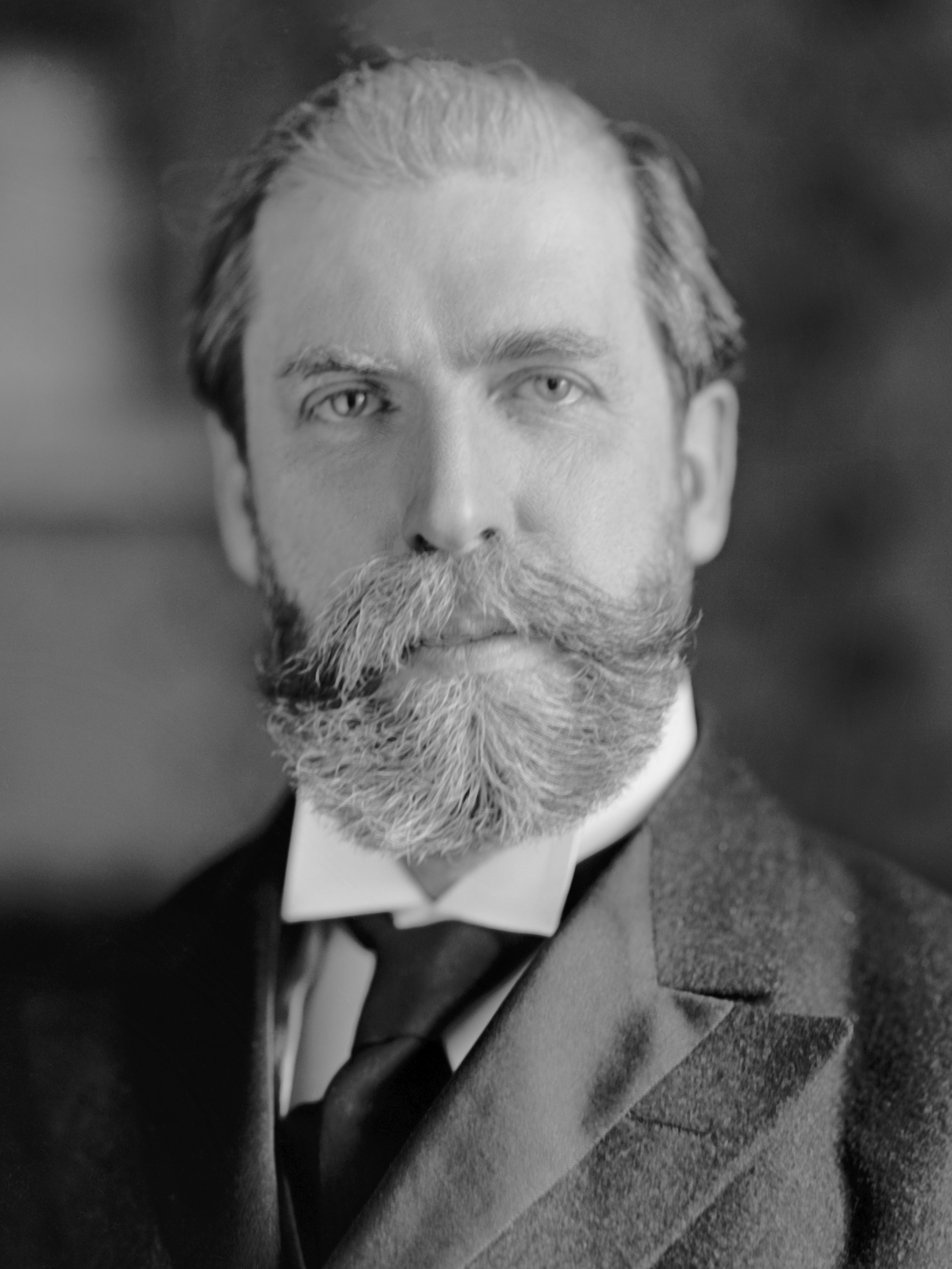

Nominee	Charles Evans Hughes	Woodrow Wilson
Party	Republican	Democratic
Home state	New York	New Jersey
Running mate	Charles W. Fairbanks	Thomas R. Marshall
Electoral vote	7	1
Popular vote	143,124	140,403
Percentage	49.38%	48.44%
County results
Hughes
40–50%
50–60%
60–70%
70–80%
Wilson
40–50%
50–60%
60–70%
70–80%
President before election
Woodrow Wilson
Democratic
Elected President
Woodrow Wilson
Democratic

The 1916 United States presidential election in West Virginia took place on November 7, 1916, as part of the 1916 United States presidential election which was held throughout all contemporary 48 states. Voters chose eight representatives, or electors to the Electoral College, who voted for president and vice president.

West Virginia was won by the Republican nominee, U.S. Supreme Court Justice Charles Evans Hughes of New York, and his running mate Senator Charles W. Fairbanks of Indiana. Hughes and Fairbanks defeated the Democratic nominees, incumbent Democratic President Woodrow Wilson and Vice President Thomas R. Marshall.

Voters in West Virginia chose each of the eight electors individually, rather than selecting between two full slates of electors all pledging support for one candidate or the other. Hughes won West Virginia by a very narrow margin of 0.94% — the state's second-closest presidential election result in history, only behind Grover Cleveland's 0.32% victory in 1888 — but one elector pledged for Wilson won, and as a result, Wilson received one electoral vote from West Virginia.

Notably, this was the only time until 2008 that a Democrat won the presidency without carrying West Virginia (or that a losing Republican would carry the state). The state would transform into a Democratic stronghold after 1932, remaining a cornerstone of the Democratic coalition until the 21st century, when it suddenly and dramatically shifted towards the Republican Party due to declining unionization and opposition to the Democratic Party's views on environmental, social and cultural issues. It was also the last time where the presidential candidate won a majority of counties in the state but did not win the state itself.

== Results ==
1916 United States presidential election in West Virginia
Party	Candidate	Votes	Percentage	Electoral votes
Republican	Charles Evans Hughes	143,124	49.38%	7
Democratic	Woodrow Wilson (incumbent)	140,403	48.44%	1
Socialist	Allan L. Benson	6,150	2.12%	0
Prohibition	Frank Hanly	175 (Note: These votes were listed only as a statewide total and not by county.)	0.06%	0
Totals		289,852	100.00%	8

=== Results by county ===
1916 United States presidential election in West Virginia by county
County	Charles Evans Hughes Republican		Woodrow Wilson Democratic		Allan L. Benson Socialist		Margin		Total votes cast
County	#	%	#	%	#	%	#	%	Total votes cast
Barbour	2,083	52.23%	1,848	46.34%	57	1.43%	235	5.89%	3,988
Berkeley	2,802	48.09%	2,938	50.43%	86	1.48%	-136	-2.33%	5,826
Boone	1,504	50.03%	1,397	46.47%	105	3.49%	107	3.56%	3,006
Braxton	2,332	44.02%	2,957	55.81%	9	0.17%	-625	-11.80%	5,298
Brooke	1,422	50.73%	1,261	44.99%	120	4.28%	161	5.74%	2,803
Cabell	5,728	46.18%	6,446	51.97%	229	1.85%	-718	-5.79%	12,403
Calhoun	936	41.31%	1,317	58.12%	13	0.57%	-381	-16.81%	2,266
Clay	1,021	48.76%	1,047	50.00%	26	1.24%	-26	-1.24%	2,094
Doddridge	1,803	62.07%	1,061	36.52%	41	1.41%	742	25.54%	2,905
Fayette	5,511	48.99%	5,377	47.80%	361	3.21%	134	1.19%	11,249
Gilmer	943	35.63%	1,695	64.03%	9	0.34%	-752	-28.41%	2,647
Grant	1,438	78.41%	391	21.32%	5	0.27%	1,047	57.09%	1,834
Greenbrier	2,601	44.41%	3,170	54.12%	86	1.47%	-569	-9.71%	5,857
Hampshire	745	25.37%	2,181	74.28%	10	0.34%	-1,436	-48.91%	2,936
Hancock	1,434	58.72%	891	36.49%	117	4.79%	543	22.24%	2,442
Hardy	701	32.88%	1,425	66.84%	6	0.28%	-724	-33.96%	2,132
Harrison	6,262	48.86%	5,970	46.58%	584	4.56%	292	2.28%	12,816
Jackson	2,474	54.55%	2,032	44.81%	29	0.64%	442	9.75%	4,535
Jefferson	1,181	31.33%	2,544	67.50%	44	1.17%	-1,363	-36.16%	3,769
Kanawha	10,096	48.14%	10,276	49.00%	598	2.85%	-180	-0.86%	20,970
Lewis	2,263	49.06%	2,248	48.73%	102	2.21%	15	0.33%	4,613
Lincoln	2,104	49.20%	2,113	49.42%	59	1.38%	-9	-0.21%	4,276
Logan	2,107	38.74%	3,270	60.12%	62	1.14%	-1,163	-21.38%	5,439
Marion	4,443	42.81%	5,493	52.92%	443	4.27%	-1,050	-10.12%	10,379
Marshall	3,699	53.42%	2,997	43.28%	229	3.31%	702	10.14%	6,925
Mason	2,454	50.17%	2,336	47.76%	101	2.07%	118	2.41%	4,891
McDowell	7,086	65.62%	3,692	34.19%	20	0.19%	3,394	31.43%	10,798
Mercer	4,788	49.47%	4,836	49.96%	55	0.57%	-48	-0.50%	9,679
Mineral	1,965	51.83%	1,747	46.08%	79	2.08%	218	5.75%	3,791
Mingo	2,223	47.25%	2,472	52.54%	10	0.21%	-249	-5.29%	4,705
Monongalia	3,412	57.48%	2,227	37.52%	297	5.00%	1,185	19.96%	5,936
Monroe	1,584	49.48%	1,609	50.27%	8	0.25%	-25	-0.78%	3,201
Morgan	1,208	63.45%	666	34.98%	30	1.58%	542	28.47%	1,904
Nicholas	2,056	44.77%	2,467	53.72%	69	1.50%	-411	-8.95%	4,592
Ohio	7,349	52.75%	6,074	43.60%	509	3.65%	1,275	9.15%	13,932
Pendleton	888	40.87%	1,276	58.72%	9	0.41%	-388	-17.86%	2,173
Pleasants	876	49.16%	899	50.45%	7	0.39%	-23	-1.29%	1,782
Pocahontas	1,550	44.90%	1,849	53.56%	53	1.54%	-299	-8.66%	3,452
Preston	3,838	68.09%	1,694	30.05%	105	1.86%	2,144	38.03%	5,637
Putnam	1,925	49.45%	1,837	47.19%	131	3.37%	88	2.26%	3,893
Raleigh	3,791	52.21%	3,319	45.71%	151	2.08%	472	6.50%	7,261
Randolph	2,165	39.78%	3,024	55.57%	253	4.65%	-859	-15.78%	5,442
Ritchie	2,225	56.03%	1,657	41.73%	89	2.24%	568	14.30%	3,971
Roane	2,406	51.97%	2,186	47.21%	38	0.82%	220	4.75%	4,630
Summers	1,781	42.47%	2,389	56.96%	24	0.57%	-608	-14.50%	4,194
Taylor	2,002	53.23%	1,672	44.46%	87	2.31%	330	8.77%	3,761
Tucker	1,531	49.76%	1,388	45.11%	158	5.13%	143	4.65%	3,077
Tyler	1,900	57.51%	1,336	40.44%	68	2.06%	564	17.07%	3,304
Upshur	2,553	70.14%	1,019	27.99%	68	1.87%	1,534	42.14%	3,640
Wayne	2,215	42.21%	2,989	56.97%	43	0.82%	-774	-14.75%	5,247
Webster	854	35.87%	1,513	63.54%	14	0.59%	-659	-27.68%	2,381
Wetzel	1,910	39.92%	2,797	58.47%	77	1.61%	-887	-18.54%	4,784
Wirt	951	46.73%	1,072	52.68%	12	0.59%	-121	-5.95%	2,035
Wood	4,521	47.69%	4,817	50.81%	142	1.50%	-296	-3.12%	9,480
Wyoming	1,484	55.17%	1,199	44.57%	7	0.26%	285	10.59%	2,690
Totals	143,124	49.41%	140,403	48.47%	6,150	2.12%	2,721	0.94%	289,677

== See also ==
- 1916 West Virginia Women's Suffrage Amendment
