= Hiss Act =

US Law (1954–Present)

Civil Service Retirement Act
- Other short titles: Civil Service Retirement Act of 1954; Hiss Act
- Effective: September 1, 1954

Legislative history
- Introduced in the House; Passed the House on; Passed the Senate on; Signed into law by President Dwight Eisenhower on

The Hiss Act (1954–Present), added to the Civil Service Retirement Act of 1930 (part of the Civil Service Retirement System or CSRS) as Public Law 769 under Statute 68, denies pensions to US civil servants convicted of crimes related to national security, amended in 1961 and overturned in 1972 by its namesake Alger Hiss. Controversy arose over "cases where the courts had imposed minimal penalties, such as suspended sentences, small fines, or probation, yet the offenders and their families suffered the additional penalty of losing all annuity benefits, sometimes based on decades of service." In 1961, it was amended “retirement benefits to U.S. employees involved in minor offenses not connected with national security.” The law remains in effect to the present.

== History ==
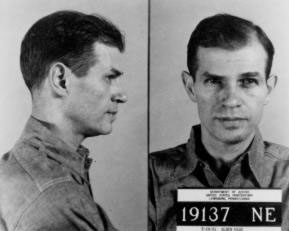
Photo of Alger Hiss, namesake of the Hiss Act, from United States Penitentiary, Lewisburg in Kelly Township, Pennsylvania (circa 1950–4)

The bill took its name from Alger Hiss, a former US civil servant convicted in 1950 on two counts of perjury related to Soviet espionage in the United States. Its initial recording dubs it "An Act to prohibit payment of annuities to officers and employees of the United States convicted of certain offenses, and for other purposes."

=== 1954 Act ===
On September 1, 1954, the Hiss Act passed. It removed pension rights of US civil servants convicted of crimes (who pleading Fifth Amendment protection). Its immediate effect was stop federal pension payments to Hiss.

Specifically, the Hiss Act “contained a list of job- related Federal felonies, the conviction of which would bar retirement benefits that would be payable to Federal employees and their families. Most of the convictions under which annuities were denied were for violations of postal law and other felony convictions that did not involve national security.”

=== 1961 Amendment ===
Congressional hearings to amend the Hiss Act started as early as 1959.

On May 12, 1960, the US Senate voted back to committee a bill by the US House to remove application to any cases that excluded national security.

In June 1960, the New York Times reported on denials of G.I. pensions under the act.

In 1961, the US Congress amended the Hiss Act through bill HR 6141 as Public Law 83-769, which became law on September 26, 1961. The amendment restored federal retirement benefits to US civil servants “involved in minor offenses not connected with national security.”

=== 1972 Reversal for Hiss ===
On March 3, 1972, the case ‘’Hiss v. Hampton’’ filed by the American Civil Liberties Union on behalf of Alger Hiss and Richard Strasburger as plaintiffs, won restitution of their pensions in the United States District Court, District of Columbia, on the basis that the Hiss Act was an "ex post facto law." The Emergency Civil Liberties Committee hailed the reversal for Hiss as a victory for application that was “penal rather than regulatory.” The government restored the pension to Hiss.

== Legacy ==
Books on law have recognized the reversals of the Hiss Act in the case of Alger Hiss.

=== 1977 Pension of Richard Helms ===
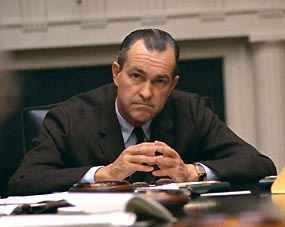
Former CIA director Richard Helms avoided having his pension stopped under the Hiss Act

On November 3, 1977, the US Department of Justice ruled against application of the Hiss Act against Richard Helms, former director of the Central Intelligence Agency, stating that he would “not be barred by 5 U.S.C. § 8314 from receiving an annuity or retired pay on the basis of his Federal service by virtue of his plea of ‘’nolo contendere’’ to two counts of violating 2 U.S.C. §192 in connection with appearances before the Senate Foreign Relations Committee on February 7 and March 6, 1973.”

=== Federal Pension Forfeiture Act ===
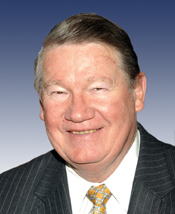
US Representative Duke Cunningham (here in undated photo) inspired a related "Duke Cunningham Act" bill to attach to the Hiss Act in 2006

On February 9, 2006, Senator John Kerry introduced a bill, the "Federal Pension Forfeiture Act" (nicknamed the "Duke Cunningham Act"), to prevent lawmakers who have been convicted of official misconduct from collecting taxpayer-funded pensions.[59] The bill died in committee, by unanimous vote.

=== 2013 Extension to Member of Congress ===
On September 12, 2013, the US Congress extended Hiss Act provisions to members of Congress.

=== 2019 Attempt to Include Child Molesters ===
In 2019, US Senator Steve Daines disclosed a bill to stop US civil servants convicted of child molestation from received their federal pensions, following investigation into former US Indian Health Service pediatrician Stanley Patrick Weber.

=== 2022 National Taxpayers Union report ===
In 2022, the National Taxpayers Union Foundation reported “no congressional felons have lost their taxpayer-funded pension.”

== See also ==
- Pensions in the United States
- Honest Leadership and Open Government Act of 2007
- Stop Trading on Congressional Knowledge Act of 2012

== Sources ==
Law;

- Warren, Kenneth F. (2010). Administrative Law in the Political System. Prentice Hall. p. 1969.

Hiss Case;

- White, G. Edward (2004). Alger Hiss's Looking-Glass Wars. Oxford University Press.
- Jacob, Susan (2009). Alger Hiss and the Battle for History. Yale University Press.
- Shelton, Christina (2012). Alger Hiss: Why He Chose Treason. Threshold.
