= The McDowell Times =

African-American newspaper in West Virginia

- Type: Weekly newspaper
- Founded: 1904
- Ceased publication: 1941
- Language: English
- City: Keystone, West Virginia
- ISSN: 2640-3471
- OCLC number: 13032822

The McDowell Times was an African American newspaper founded in Keystone, West Virginia, in 1904. It ceased publication in 1941. It was published by M.T. Whittico & R.W. White. The newspaper came out weekly, and dealt with issues of concern to the African-American communities living in the coalfields of the area, including Republican politics, labor issues, and the connection between race and class. The driving force behind the establishment of the paper was Matthew Thomas (M.T.) Whittico, the paper's editor. Whittico was born soon after the Civil War, and graduated from Lincoln University, an all-black college in Pennsylvania. In 1904 he purchased a local newspaper after he moved to Keystone, and renamed it The McDowell Times. The newspaper belonged to the National Newspaper Publishers Association. The newspaper did well until Whittico's death in June 1939. Within two years of Whittico's death the paper closed.

== See also ==
- Tyler Edward Hill
