= Keystone, West Virginia =

- City
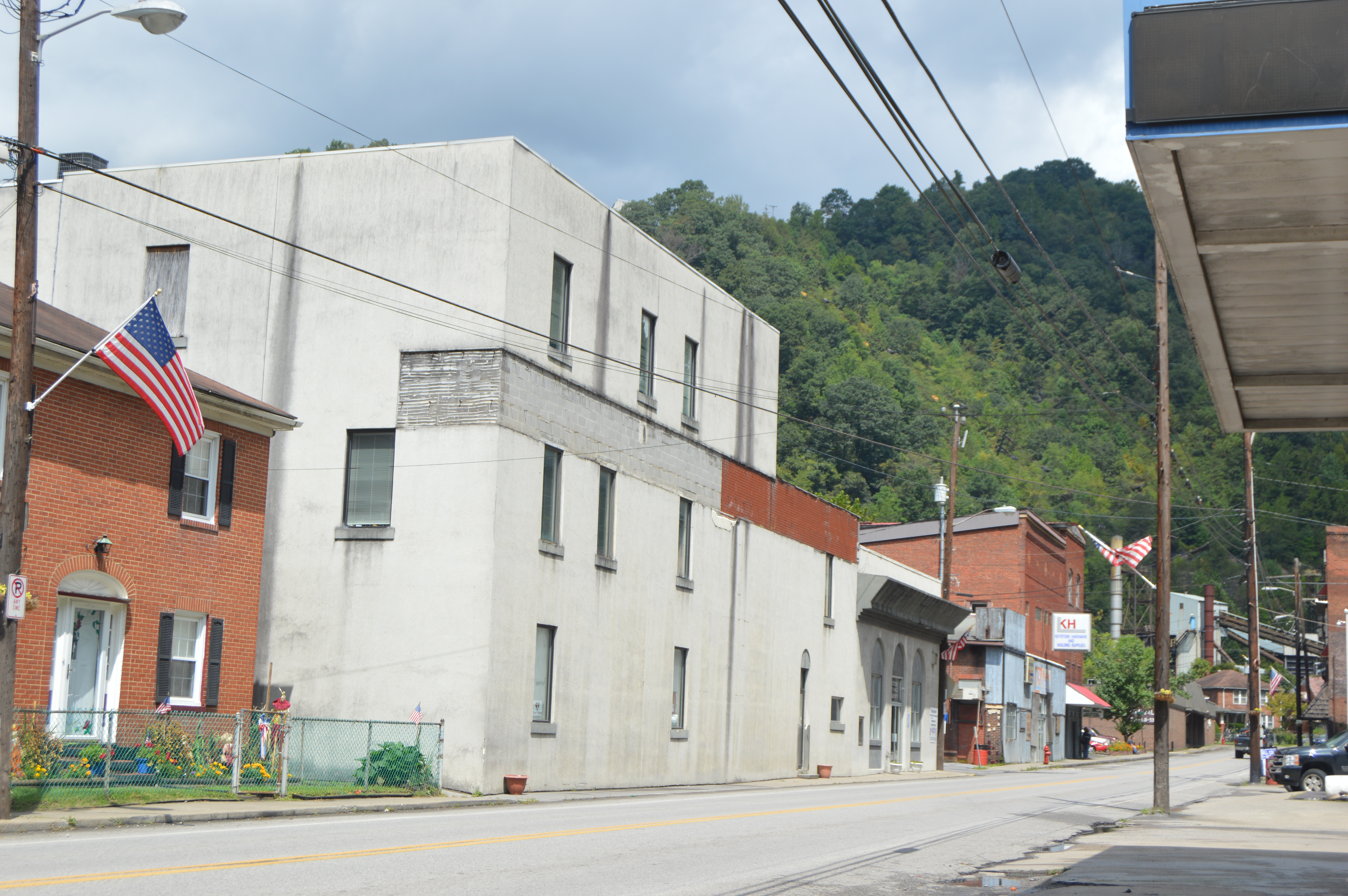
- U.S. Route 52 in the city's southwest

- Location of Keystone in McDowell County, West Virginia.

- Location in the United States
- Coordinates: 37°24′54″N 81°26′46″W
- Country: United States
- State: West Virginia
- County: McDowell

Government
  - Mayor: Dennis Robertson

Area
  - Total: 0.32 sq mi (0.84 km^{2})
  - Land: 0.32 sq mi (0.84 km^{2})
  - Water: 0 sq mi (0.00 km^{2})
- Elevation: 1,631 ft (497 m)

Population (2020)
  - Total: 176
  - Density: 688.9/sq mi (265.98/km^{2})
- Time zone: UTC-5 (Eastern (EST))
  - Summer (DST): UTC-4 (EDT)
- ZIP code: 24852
- Area code: 304
- FIPS code: 54-43516
- GNIS feature ID: 1554871
- Website: https://local.wv.gov/keystone/Pages/default.aspx

Keystone is a city in McDowell County, West Virginia, United States. Per the 2020 census, the population was 176. Keystone is one of the few municipalities in West Virginia with an African-American majority, with 57 percent of the residents being black.

The term "Free State of McDowell" was coined by Matthew Thomas Whittico, a local newspaper editor and community leader from Keystone in the early 20th century. Keystone possessed a unique combination of political, social, and economic characteristics that made it an attractive place for African-Americans to migrate to in the late 1800s and early 1900s.

== History ==
Keystone was founded in 1892 by the Keystone Coal & Coke Company. Keystone was then incorporated in 1909 by the Circuit Court of McDowell County. Its name is derived from the name of the coal and coke company operating at that point. The city was formerly known as Cassville.

On May 1, 1895, 15,000 union miners (predominantly black) assembled in Keystone and armed themselves, planning to march across the state line to Virginia in order to force the Virginia miners in one bordering mine (also predominantly black) to unionize. The governor of Virginia, Charles O'Ferrall, ordered an artillery company and six infantry companies to the Virginia border, but West Virginia Governor William MacCorkle refused repeated requests from O'Ferrall to reciprocate.

This was in response to the N&W Railroad lowering the minimum price guarantee on coal shipped to Tidewater ports. The operators reduced wages by 20% in response and encouraged their miners to strike. By the end of April that year, the mines on the WV side had completely shut down, but a large mine across the state line in Virginia continued to operate.

The strike collapsed by the end of August. The UMWA was a relatively young union, and could not support a strike of this magnitude. In the end, most of the mines resumed operations with mostly imported strikebreakers.

== Geography ==
According to the United States Census Bureau, the city has a total area of 0.32 square miles (0.83 km^{2}), all land.

The town is a railway station on the Norfolk Southern Railway (former Norfolk and Western) network.

== Demographics ==
Historical population
Census	Pop.	Note	%±
1900	1,088		—
1910	2,047		88.1%
1920	1,839		−10.2%
1930	1,897		3.2%
1940	2,942		55.1%
1950	2,594		−11.8%
1960	1,457		−43.8%
1970	1,008		−30.8%
1980	902		−10.5%
1990	627		−30.5%
2000	453		−27.8%
2010	282		−37.7%
2020	176		−37.6%
U.S. Decennial Census; 2015 Estimate

=== Racial and ethnic composition ===
Keystone city, West Virginia – Racial and ethnic composition Note: the US Census treats Hispanic/Latino as an ethnic category. This table excludes Latinos from the racial categories and assigns them to a separate category. Hispanics/Latinos may be of any race.
Race / Ethnicity (NH = Non-Hispanic)	Pop 2000	Pop 2010	Pop 2020	% 2000	% 2010	% 2020
White alone (NH)	111	96	62	24.50%	34.04%	35.23%
Black or African American alone (NH)	330	183	101	72.85%	64.89%	57.39%
Native American or Alaska Native alone (NH)	2	0	0	0.44%	0.00%	0.00%
Asian alone (NH)	0	1	1	0.00%	0.35%	0.57%
Native Hawaiian or Pacific Islander alone (NH)	0	0	0	0.00%	0.00%	0.00%
Other race alone (NH)	0	0	1	0.00%	0.00%	0.57%
Mixed race or Multiracial (NH)	9	0	10	1.99%	0.00%	5.68%
Hispanic or Latino (any race)	1	2	1	0.22%	0.71%	0.57%
Total	453	282	176	100.00%	100.00%	100.00%

=== 2020 census ===
As of the 2020 census, Keystone had a population of 176. The median age was 47.8 years. 23.3% of residents were under the age of 18 and 18.2% of residents were 65 years of age or older. For every 100 females there were 97.8 males, and for every 100 females age 18 and over there were 84.9 males age 18 and over.

0.0% of residents lived in urban areas, while 100.0% lived in rural areas.

There were 82 households in Keystone, of which 35.4% had children under the age of 18 living in them. Of all households, 28.0% were married-couple households, 20.7% were households with a male householder and no spouse or partner present, and 46.3% were households with a female householder and no spouse or partner present. About 36.6% of all households were made up of individuals and 17.1% had someone living alone who was 65 years of age or older.

There were 108 housing units, of which 24.1% were vacant. The homeowner vacancy rate was 1.6% and the rental vacancy rate was 0.0%.

=== 2010 census ===
As of the census of 2010, there were 282 people, 122 households, and 74 families living in the city. The population density was 881.3 inhabitants per square mile (340.3/km^{2}). There were 183 housing units at an average density of 571.9 per square mile (220.8/km^{2}). The racial makeup of the city was 34.4% White, 65.2% African American, and 0.4% Asian. Hispanic or Latino of any race were 0.7% of the population.

There were 122 households, of which 32.8% had children under the age of 18 living with them, 28.7% were married couples living together, 25.4% had a female householder with no husband present, 6.6% had a male householder with no wife present, and 39.3% were non-families. 36.1% of all households were made up of individuals, and 13.1% had someone living alone who was 65 years of age or older. The average household size was 2.31 and the average family size was 2.95.

The median age in the city was 38 years. 23.4% of residents were under the age of 18; 9.3% were between the ages of 18 and 24; 23% were from 25 to 44; 31.9% were from 45 to 64; and 12.4% were 65 years of age or older. The gender makeup of the city was 41.5% male and 58.5% female.

=== 2000 census ===
As of the census of 2000, there were 453 people, 203 households, and 120 families living in the city. The population density was 1,397.1 people per square mile (546.6/km^{2}). There were 236 housing units at an average density of 727.8 per square mile (284.8/km^{2}). The racial makeup of the city was 72.85% African American, 24.50% White, 0.44% Native American, 0.22% from other races, and 1.99% from two or more races. Hispanic or Latino of any race were 0.22% of the population.

There were 203 households, out of which 27.1% had children under the age of 18 living with them, 25.6% were married couples living together, 29.6% had a female householder with no husband present, and 40.4% were non-families. 38.9% of all households were made up of individuals, and 19.7% had someone living alone who was 65 years of age or older. The average household size was 2.23 and the average family size was 2.93.

In the city the population was spread out, with 27.2% under the age of 18, 7.7% from 18 to 24, 21.4% from 25 to 44, 21.6% from 45 to 64, and 22.1% who were 65 years of age or older. The median age was 40 years. For every 100 females, there were 70.3 males. For every 100 females age 18 and over, there were 68.4 males.

The median income for a household in the city was $10,417, and the median income for a family was $12,639. Males had a median income of $14,167 versus $18,750 for females. The per capita income for the city was $7,033, the second lowest in the state. About 48.8% of families and 46.3% of the population were below the poverty line, including 63.8% of those under age 18 and 25.5% of those age 65 or over.

== Notable people ==
- Bob Bowman Major league baseball pitcher.
- Stewart A. Calhoun, lawyer and state legislator

== See also ==
- Tyler Edward Hill
- List of U.S. communities with African-American majority populations in 2020
