= J. Clay Smith Jr. =

American lawyer and educator

John Clay Smith Jr. (April 15, 1942 – February 15, 2018) was a lawyer, author, and American educator. He served as dean of Howard University School of Law. He wrote The Making of the Black Lawyer, 1844–1944.

Smith was born in Omaha, Nebraska. He graduated from Creighton University in 1964 and his master's and doctorate's degree from George Washington University. Smith received his law degree from the Howard University School of Law and was admitted to the Nebraska bar.

Smith served in the Judge Advocate General's Corps, United States Army. In 1978, President Jimmy Carter named Smith to the Equal Employment Opportunity Commission and served as interim chair in 1981 and 1982. He then served on the Howard University faculty and then retired in 2004. Smith died in Washington, D.C., from Alzheimer's disease.

== Writings ==
- Emancipation: The Making of the Black Lawyer, 1844–1944 (1993)
