= List of African American newspapers in Virginia =

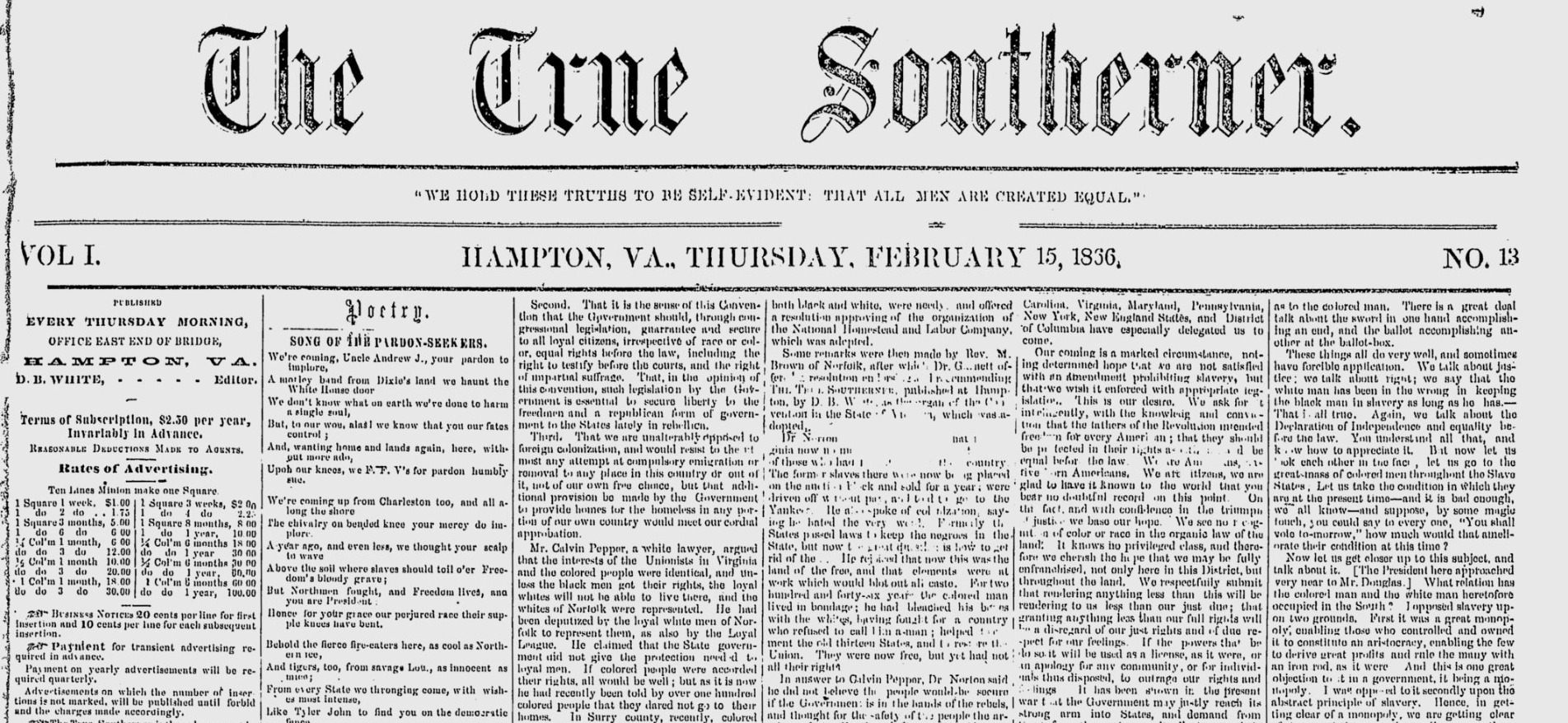
The True Southerner from February 1866.

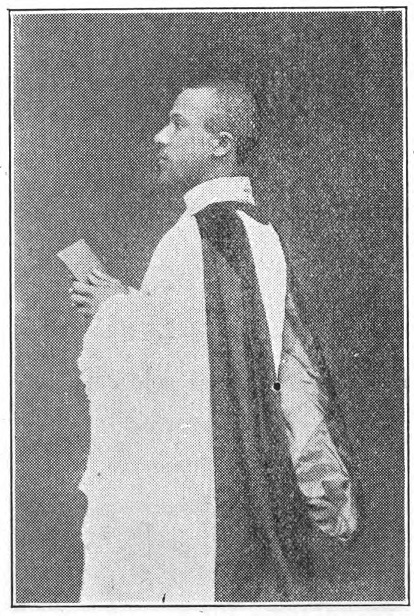
George Freeman Bragg, editor of the Virginia Lancet.

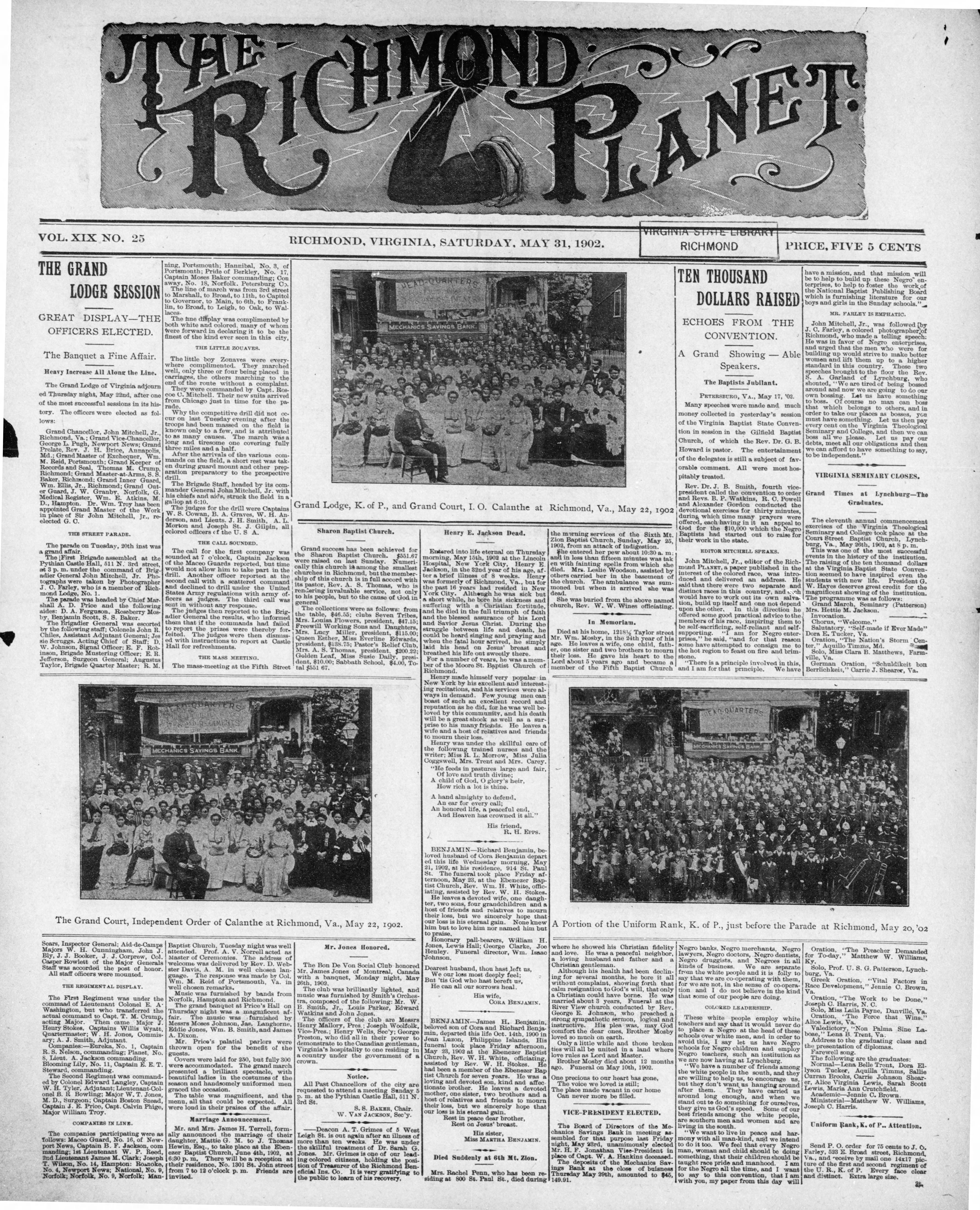
Front page of the Richmond Planet from 1902.

This is a list of African American newspapers that have been published in Virginia. It includes both current and historical newspapers.

The first African American newspaper in the state was The True Southerner, in 1865. In the ensuing four decades, more than 50 such newspapers sprang up, addressing the manifold challenges facing the African American community during and after Reconstruction. Among these, a few took a leading role in the state's political discourse, such as the Richmond Planet, Virginia Lancet and Virginia Star.

Notable African American newspapers in Virginia today include the New Journal and Guide, Roanoke Tribune, and Richmond Free Press.

== Newspapers ==
| City | Title | Beginning | End | Frequency | Call numbers | Remarks |
|---|---|---|---|---|---|---|
| Alexandria | Clipper | 1891 | 1894 | | | Merged with Alexandria Leader in 1894. |
| Alexandria | The Industrial Advocate | 1900 | 1910 | | | Edited by Magnus Lewis Robinson. |
| Alexandria | Leader | 1888 | 1894 | | | Merged with Alexandria Clipper in 1894. |
| Alexandria | Leader and Clipper / The Alexandria Leader (1898–) | 1894 | 1890s | | | Formed from merger of Leader and Clipper in 1894. |
| Alexandria | The Metro Herald | 1990? | 2018 | Weekly | ISSN 1061-4532; LCCN sn92003167; OCLC 25375495 | |
| Alexandria | The People's Advocate | 1876 | 1879 | Weekly | LCCN 2014254005, sn84025894; OCLC 874920534, 10587978 | Moved to Washington, D.C. in 1879. |
| Alexandria | Post and National Echo | 1882 | 1882 | | | Founded by Magnus Lewis Robinson. |
| Alexandria | Virginia Post | 1880 | 1882 | | | Taken over by Magnus Lewis Robinson in 1881 after editor P.W. Stewart suspended publication. |
| Berryville | The People's Journal | 1800s | 1900s | Monthly newspaper | LCCN sn95079087; OCLC 32261642 | Extant in at least 1899.; Published by G.L.D. Harris. |
| Boydton | The Midland Express | 1891 | 1895 | Weekly | LCCN 2013254314, sn86058060; OCLC 844090234, 13352245, 2772284 | |
| Buckingham | The Informant | 1987 | current | Monthly newspaper | LCCN sn96009500; OCLC 34457929 | Published by Charles W. White.; Extant through at least 2017. |
| Catlett | The Circuit | 1937 | 1954 | Monthly newspaper | LCCN sn99066743; OCLC 40901521 | |
| Charles City | Charles City Times | 1966 | ? | Twice-monthly | LCCN sn94060074; OCLC 30963442 | |
| Charlottesville | The African American Reflector | 2003 | 2005 | Biweekly | LCCN sn2004061518; OCLC 52433907 | Edited by Corey E. Carter.; Named in honor of T.J. Sellers' The Reflector newspaper. |
| Charlottesville | Messenger | 1909 | 1928 | Weekly | | Edited by John G. Shelton. |
| Charlottesville | The Reflector | 1933 | ? | Weekly | LCCN sn95079541; OCLC 32404255 | Extant through at least 1935.; Published by T.J. Sellers. |
| Charlottesville | Charlottesville Tribune | 1950 | 1951 | Weekly | LCCN sn95079538; OCLC 32252741 | Published by the Roanoke Tribune. |
| Charlottesville | The Tribune (1992–) / Charlottesville-Albemarle Tribune (1954–1992) | 1954 | 2011 | Weekly | The Tribune: LCCN sn95079529; OCLC 27008933; Charlottesville-Albemarle Tribune: LCCN sn95079521; OCLC 12302644 | |
| Claremont | The Monthly Advocate | 1896 | 1800s | Twice-monthly | LCCN sn98068239; OCLC 40099702 | Published by the Temperance, Industrial and Collegiate Institute. |
| Danville | Danville News and Observer | 1974? | ? | Monthly | LCCN sn99063219; OCLC 41609458 | Extant through at least 1977. |
| Farmville | The Voice Of Prince Edward County | 1960s | ? | Monthly newspaper | LCCN sn98068058; OCLC 38371567 | Extant from 1966. |
| Hampton | The Hampton Roads Voice | 1994 | 2014 | Weekly | LCCN sn2004061588; OCLC 55228230 | Published by Jack J. Green.; Merged with Richmond Voice in 2014 to form The Voice. |
| Hampton | The True Southerner | 1865 | 1866 | Weekly | LCCN sn93059185; OCLC 27480413 | Free online archive; Started by white army officer in 1865, but taken over by Joseph T. Wilson in 1866.; Moved to Norfolk in 1866. Printing presses smashed by white mob in Norfolk later that year. |
| Lynchburg | Counselor and Herald | 1892? | ? | Weekly | | |
| Lynchburg | First Class | 1984 | ? | Bimonthly newspaper | | |
| Lynchburg | Interpreter | 1903 | 1906 | | | Founded by Robert W. Goff.; Only African American paper in Lynchburg in first decade of 1900s. |
| Lynchburg | Laboring Man | 1886 | 1888 | | | |
| Lynchburg | Southern Forge | 1895 | 1896 | | | |
| Lynchburg | The Voice Of God | 1890s | 1900s | Weekly | LCCN sn96096555; OCLC 34494037 | Surviving issue from 1897. |
| Newport News | The Star/ Newport News Star | 1900 or 1901 | 1940 | Weekly | The Star; LCCN sn95079078; OCLC 32253086; Newport News Star; LCCN sn95079077; OCLC 32253046 | |
| Newport News | Your Tidewater Community Paper | 1991 | Monthly (Irregular) | OCLC 24782717 | Published by Ibn H.K. Khailfah. | |
| Norfolk | American Sentinel | 1880 | 1881 | | | Co-founded by Joseph T. Wilson. |
| Norfolk | The American Ethiopian | 1900 | 1907 | | | |
| Norfolk | Journal and Guide / The New Journal and Guide (1991–) | 1901 | current | Weekly | ISSN 2641-1350; LCCN 2011263305, sn95079582; OCLC 767759130, 26628042 | Official site; Published as Journal and Guide and Newport News Star from 1940 to 1943. |
| Norfolk | The Lodge Journal and Guide | 1900 | 1910 | | | |
| Norfolk | The News and Advertiser | 1900 | 1908 | | | |
| Norfolk | The Rambler | 1894 | 1898 | | | |
| Norfolk | The Right Way | 1885 | | | | |
| Norfolk | The Speaker | 1889 | 1893 | | | Politically independent. |
| Norfolk | The Spectator | 1887 | 1891 | | | |
| Norfolk | The Standard | 1889 | 1891 | | | |
| Petersburg | Afro-American Churchman | 1885 or 1886 | 1890 | Monthly newspaper | ISSN 2574-6448; LCCN sn85038628; OCLC 6690589 | Successor to The Lancet.; Published in Petersburg 1886–1888, and in Norfolk 1889–1890.; Published by George Freeman Bragg. |
| Petersburg | The Colored Virginian | 1875? | ? | Weekly | | |
| Petersburg | The Evening Recorder | 1897 | Daily | | Founded by Matt Lewis. | |
| Petersburg | The Family Reguel | 1880s | 1880s | Monthly | | |
| Petersburg | The Petersburg Herald | 1888 | 1899 | Weekly | LCCN sn96096570; OCLC 34533107 | Initially founded by Matt Lewis to promote the successful congressional campaign of John Mercer Langston. |
| Petersburg | The Lancet / Virginia Lancet | 1882 | 1886 | Weekly | ISSN 2574-6456; LCCN sn96094029; OCLC 34433728 | Published by George Freeman Bragg. |
| Petersburg | The National Pilot | 1886 | 1900 | Weekly | LCCN 2013254330, sn84025813; OCLC 844985842, 10328978, 2753790 | Edited by Charles B.W. Gordon. |
| Petersburg | The Recorder | 1893 | 1897 | Weekly | | Founded by Matt Lewis. |
| Petersburg | The Southern Tribune | 1884 | 1884 | | | Founded to counteract the pro-Readjuster effect of the Petersburg Lancet. |
| Petersburg | The Star of Zion | 1880s | 1880s | Weekly | | |
| Petersburg | Union Republican | 1866 | Triweekly | LCCN sn94051043; OCLC 30055832 | Founded by Joseph T. Wilson after mob violence forced him to leave Norfolk. | |
| Portsmouth | Black Net Working | 1980s | 1900s | | LCCN sn2001062401; OCLC 46398618 | Extant as of 1987.; Published by Larry Alexander. |
| Richmond | Richmond Afro-American | 1939 | 1941 | Weekly | LCCN sn84025922; OCLC 10702392 | |
| Richmond | Richmond Free Press | 1992 | current | Weekly | ISSN 1534-6889; LCCN sn97066503; OCLC 28510270 | Official site; Distributed free of charge. |
| Richmond | The Good News Herald | 1986? | Monthly newspaper | OCLC 31281018 | | |
| Richmond | Industrial Day | 1888 | 1890 | | | Edited by Joseph T. Wilson. |
| Richmond | Legacy | 2015 | current | Weekly | LCCN 2010271361; OCLC 903656001 | Official site; Issues online |
| Richmond | The Negro Advocate | 1902 | ? | Biweekly | | |
| Richmond | Richmond Planet | 1883 | 1938 | Weekly | ISSN 2151-4011; LCCN 2014254304, sn84025841; OCLC 463293523, 10412790 | Free online archive |
| Richmond | The Reformer | 1895 | 1931 | Weekly | LCCN sn84025814; OCLC 10328985, 22156119 | Official newspaper of the Grand Fountain United Order of True Reformers. |
| Richmond | The Reporter | 1890 | 1893 | | | Politically independent. |
| Richmond | The Southern News | 1892 | 1894 | Weekly | LCCN sn83027098; OCLC 10101960, 2789631 | |
| Richmond | The Southside Voice | 1987 | 1987 | Semimonthly newspaper | LCCN sn95079007; OCLC 16462032 | Free newspaper.; Published by Southside Voice, Inc. |
| Richmond | St. Luke Herald | 1902? | ? | Weekly | OCLC 34332604 | |
| Richmond | The Virginia Star | 1877 | 1888 | Weekly | LCCN sn83027093; OCLC 9973874, 278453 | "[E]stablished in September 1877 by R.A. Green, a physician, in partnership with black businessmen O.M. Steward and P.H. Woolfolk."; Supported the Readjuster Party. |
| Richmond | Richmond Voice | 1987? | 2000s | Weekly | LCCN sn98068059; OCLC 31252008, 32177482 | Distributed free of charge.; Published by Jack J. Green; Followed by Legacy. |
| Richmond | The Richmond Voice / The Voice | 1917? or 1918 | 1926 | Weekly | | Edited by Benjamin F. Vaughn.; Took the place of the Young Men's Voice. |
| Roanoke | The Roanoke Tribune / The Tribune (1951–) | 1939 | current | Weekly | The Roanoke Tribune: LCCN sn98068354; OCLC 39072181; The Tribune: LCCN sn98068351; OCLC 39072118 | Official site; Free online archive; Founded by F.E. Alexander.; Billed as the "[o]nly negro newspaper published in Southwest Virginia." |
| Roanoke | Roanoke Weekly Press | 1891 | 1897 | Weekly | LCCN sn95079197; OCLC 32801844 | |
| Staunton | Staunton Reporter | 1921 | 1923 | Weekly | LCCN sn00064478; OCLC 50680817 | Published by O.W. Marshall. |
| Staunton | Staunton Reporter | 1915 | 1918 | Weekly | LCCN sn00064479; OCLC 50547001 | Relationship to later Staunton Reporter unclear. |
| Staunton | Staunton Tribune / Southern Tribune | 1891 | 1896 | Weekly | LCCN 2010027143; OCLC 784152656 | Published by Willis M. Carter. |
| Staunton | The Staunton Tribune | 1926 | 1933 | Weekly | LCCN sn94060049; OCLC 30925167 | |
| Staunton | The Valley Index | 1897 | 1905 | | | Founded by James M. Morris. |
| Staunton | Virginia Critic | 1884 | 1888 | | | Founded by C.L. Smith and D.C. Carter. |
| Newport News / Tidewater | The National Newport News & Commentator | 1986 | 1993 | Bimonthly newspaper | OCLC 20869168, 22443372 | |
| Virginia Beach | The Answer | 1982 | 1900s | | LCCN sn2001062403; OCLC 46403226 | Billed as "[t]he progressive newspaper for the progressive citizen."; Published by E. George Minns |
| Waverly | Pioneer | 1894 | 1895 | | | |
| Williamsburg | Peninsula Churchman | 1900s | ? | | LCCN sn96094043; OCLC 34784409 | Affiliated with the Baptist church.; Extant at least in 1904. |

== See also ==
- List of African American newspapers and media outlets
- List of African American newspapers in Kentucky
- List of African American newspapers in Maryland
- List of African American newspapers in North Carolina
- List of African American newspapers in Tennessee
- List of African American newspapers in Washington, D.C.
- List of African American newspapers in West Virginia
- List of newspapers in Virginia

== Works cited ==
- Danky, James Philip; Hady, Maureen E., eds. (1998). African-American newspapers and periodicals : a national bibliography. Harvard University Press. ISBN 9780674007888.
- Pride, Armistead Scott; Wilson, Clint C. (1997). A History of the Black Press. Howard University Press. ISBN 9780882581927.
- Smith, Jessie Carney (2012). Black Firsts: 4,000 Ground-Breaking and Pioneering Historical Events. Visible Ink Press. ISBN 9781578593699.
- Suggs, Henry Lewis (1983). "Virginia". In Suggs, Henry Lewis (ed.). The Black Press in the South, 1865–1979. ISBN 9780313222443.
