= List of African American newspapers in Kentucky =

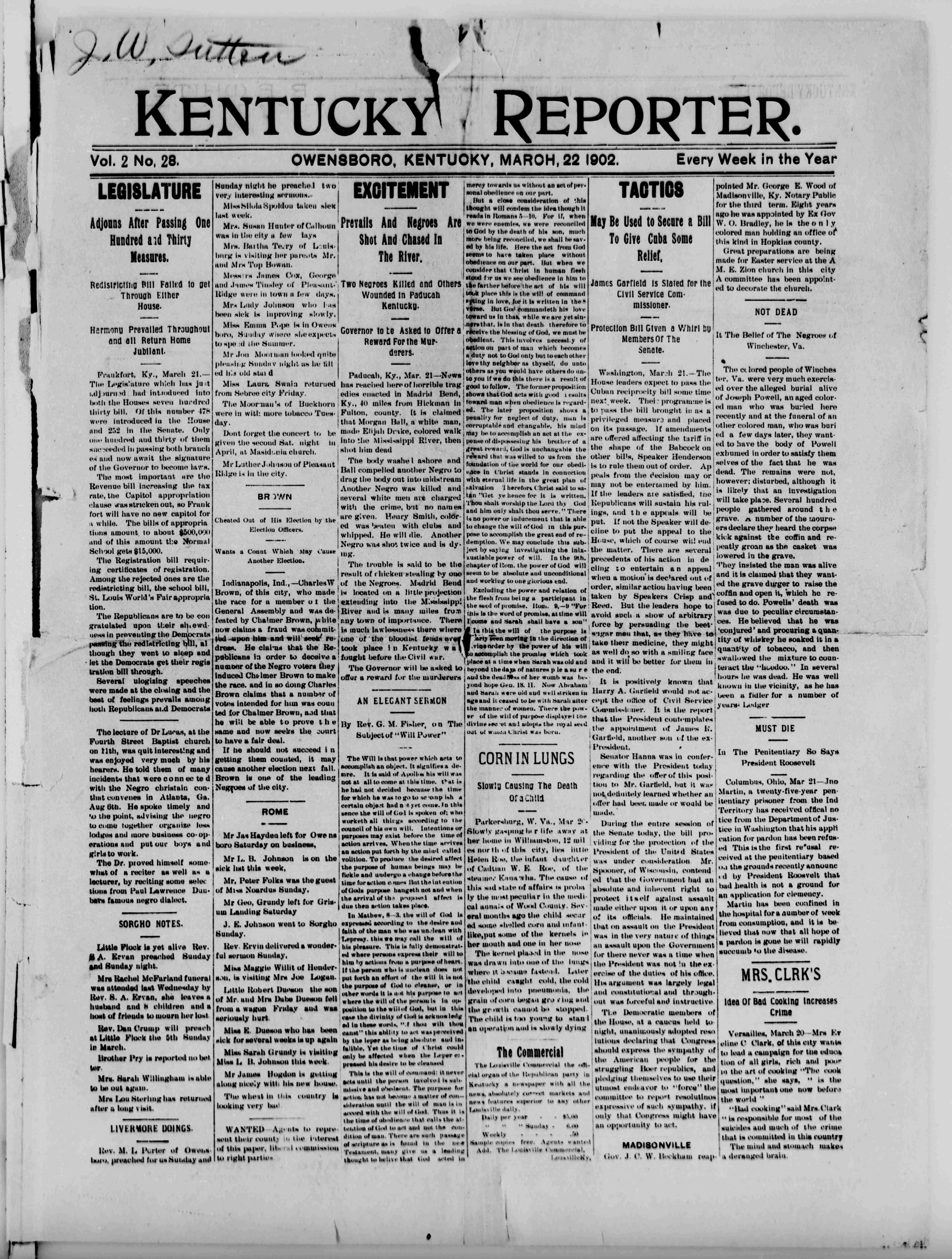
March 22, 1902 issue of the Kentucky Reporter of Owensville.

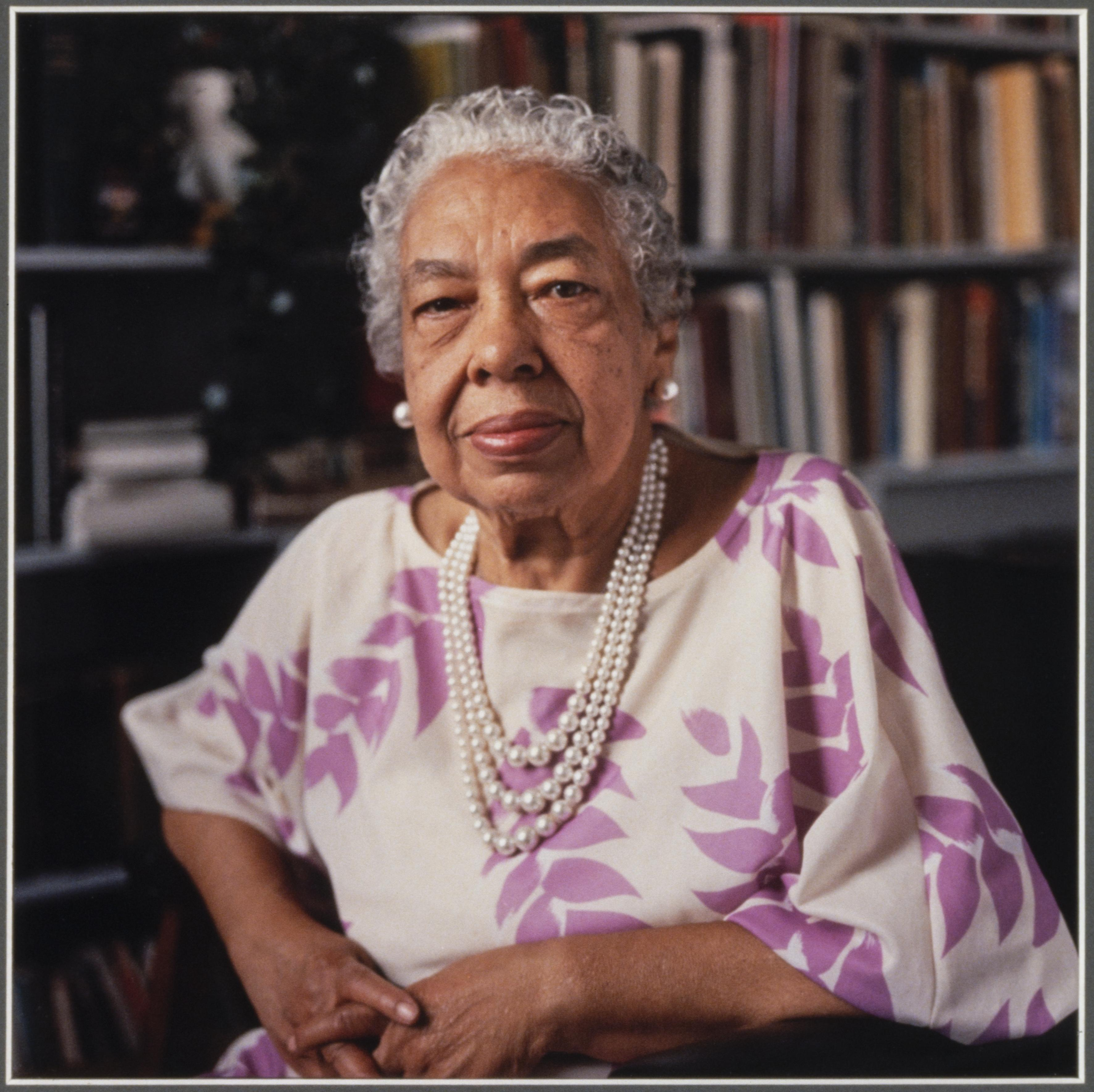
Alice Allison Dunnigan, pioneering journalist whose newspaper career began at the Rising Sun and Globe Journal in Hopkinsville, Kentucky.

This is a list of African American newspapers that have been published in Kentucky. It includes both current and historical newspapers.

The first known African American newspapers to serve Kentucky were the Colored Citizen, which was briefly published in Louisville in 1866, and the Colored Kentuckian, launched in 1867.

African American newspapers serving Kentucky today include the Louisville Defender, the Key Newsjournal of Lexington, and the Northern Kentucky Herald, published by Sesh Publications in Cincinnati, Ohio.

== Newspapers ==
City	Title	Beginning	End	Frequency	Call numbers	Remarks
Bowling Green	The Eagle Eye	1903	?	Weekly	LCCN sn87060407; OCLC 17275340	
Bowling Green	Liberty	?	1912			
Bowling Green	Bowling Green Watchman	1887	1892			NKAA Entry; Founded and edited by Cyrus R. McDowell.
Brownsville	Edmonson Star News / Edmonson County Star / Edmonson Star	1916	1917?	Weekly	LCCN sn86069463; OCLC 14174340	NKAA Entry; Founded and edited by Denver D. Ferguson.
Cadiz	Cadiz Informer	1904	1937			NKAA Entry; Edited and published by Wendell H. McRidley.
Covington	The Lincoln-Grant Herald	1913	?			Free online archive; Edited by E. Beatrice Brown.
Covington	Suspension Press	1982	?	Biweekly (irregular)	LCCN sn85052183; OCLC 12768960	
Danville / Lexington	Torchlight / Torch Light	1902 or 1903	1929 or 1932			NKAA Entry; Owned and edited by John Edmund Wood.; Moved to Lexington in early 1910s.
Danville	Tribune	1878	1892			
Elizabethtown	Christian Pilot	1880s	1880s			Published by Eugene Evans.
Frankfort	The Blue Grass Bugle / Bluegrass Bugle	1898?	1915	Weekly	LCCN sn87060274; OCLC 16046186	NKAA Entry; Edited by Edward Ellsworth Underwood.
Frankfort	Frankfort Clarion	?	?			NKAA Entry; Owned and edited by Clarence L. Timberlake.
Frankfort	The Kentucky Club Woman	1900s				NKAA Entry; Official newspaper of the Kentucky State Federation of Colored Women's Clubs.; Edited by Daisy M. Saffell in 1913.
Frankfort	Masonic Herald	1914	1915			NKAA Entry
Frankfort	The Star Weekly	1914	?	Weekly		NKAA Entry; Edited and published by Hardin Tolbert.
Frankfort	Frankfort Tribune	?	?	Weekly		NKAA Entry; Edited and published by Hardin Tolbert.
Henderson	Gleaner	1890s		Weekly		
Henderson	Kentucky Missionary Visitor	?	1915			NKAA Entry; Edited by Paul H. Kennedy.
Hopkinsville	Baptist Monitor	1880s				NKAA Entry; Edited by James L. Allensworth, Sr.
Hopkinsville	Hopkinsville Contender	1919	1920			NKAA Entry; Owned and published by Ephraim Poston.
Hopkinsville	Hopkinsville Globe Journal / Hopkinsville Globe	1932 or 1936	1943 or 1941	Weekly		NKAA Entry; Circulation reached 2,000.
Hopkinsville	Indicator	1892	?	Weekly		Founded by mortician E.W. Glass.; Circulation of 1,800 in 1896.
Hopkinsville	The Little Courant	1919	1922			Founded and published by James T. Whitney Jr.
Hopkinsville	Major / The Major	1896 or 1897	1904			NKAA Entry; Published by A.C. Banks.; Purchased by Phil H. Brown in 1903.
Hopkinsville	Morning News	1903	1913	Daily		NKAA Entry; Edited by Phil H. Brown.; Became the Saturday News in 1913.
Hopkinsville	The New Age	1920s				Founded by principal M.J. Sleet.
Hopkinsville	Rising Sun	1900s	1900s			Sold to Hopkinsville Globe.
Hopkinsville	Saturday News	1913 or 1919	1922	Weekly		NKAA Entry; Published by Phil H. Brown.
Lebanon	Freeman	?	1912			
Lexington	Advance-Courier	1885	1886	Weekly		NKAA Entry
Lexington	American Citizen	1874	1800s	Weekly	LCCN sn84038151; OCLC 11190387	NKAA Entry; Edited by Jordan C. Jackson, Jr. and Henry Scroggins.
Lexington	Bluegrass Chronicle	1978	1980 or 1981		LCCN sn85052181; OCLC 12769332	NKAA Entry; Published by Edgar Wallace and Nicolas Martin.
Lexington	Blue Grass New Era	1890s	?	Twice weekly		
Lexington	Christian Trumpet	1921	?			NKAA Entry; Published by the Convention of the Colored Christian Churches of Kentucky.
Lexington	The Christian Soldier	1872	?			NKAA Entry; Edited by R. E. Pearson and printed by Daniel I. Reid.
Lexington	The Lexington Chronicle	1967	?			LCCN sn87060240; OCLC 1566638; NKAA Entry; Owned, edited and published by Theodore "Cal" Wallace, Sr. and family.
Lexington	The Colored Citizen	1913	?	Daily	LCCN sn85052176; OCLC 12746117	NKAA Entry; Founded and edited by Daniel I. Reid.
Lexington	Colored Representative	1871	1870s	Weekly	LCCN 2017225075, sn93059169; OCLC 1000052581, 27447727	Published by G.B. Thomas.
Lexington	Community Voice	1987	2001	Weekly	LCCN sn92056614; OCLC 26925422	NKAA Entry; Published by Don L. Cordray.
Lexington	Fair Play	1880s	1880s			Published by Eugene Evans.
Lexington	Inter-State County News	1935	1940			NKAA Entry; Edited by James W. Wood.
Lexington	Key Newsjournal	2004	current			Official site; NKAA Entry; Founded and edited by Patrice Muhammad and LaMaughn Muhammad.
Lexington	Masonic and Odd Fellows' Journal	1876	?			NKAA Entry; Official newspaper of the Kentucky branches of the Independent Grand Lodge of Masons and Grand United Order of Odd Fellows.
Lexington	The Lexington Standard	1892	1912	Weekly	ISSN 2157-1384; LCCN 2013254300, sn83025729; OCLC 701514142, 9765671, 2753658	NKAA Entry; Editors included R. C. O. Benjamin, William D. Johnson, Daniel I. Reid, Henry P. Slaughter, and Wade H. Carter.
Lexington	Lexington Weekly News	1912	?			NKAA Entry; Published by Edward D. Willis, Daniel I. Reid, and A. W. Davis.
Louisville	Afro-American Mission Herald	1897	1912			Free online archive; NKAA Entry; "[T]he first paper to advance and nurture the foreign mission agenda of the National Baptist Convention of the United States of America."
Louisville	American Baptist / American Baptist News	1878 or 1879	current	Weekly	LCCN sn93062854; OCLC 27507899; ISSN 1943-8885	Official site; Free online archive; NKAA Entry; Successor to the Paducah Baptist Herald.
Louisville	The Bulletin	1879	1885	Weekly	LCCN 2011254269, sn83016361; OCLC 560545170, 9745888	NKAA Entry; Published by John and Cyrus Adams.
Louisville	The Champion	1890	1893			NKAA Entry; Edited by Horace Morris and G. W. Hatton.
Louisville	Christian Index	1873	1882 (Louisville, KY), 1882-1966 (Jackson, TN)			NKAA Entry; Editors: Henry Clay Weeden and J. W. Bell of the Colored Methodist Episcopal Church.; Formerly of Memphis, and later relocated to Jackson, Tennessee, where it published until 1966.
Louisville	The Colored Citizen	1866	?			NKAA Entry; Edited by Horace Morris, John H. Mason, and Marsh Woodson. Published by the Convention of Colored Men in Kentucky.
Louisville	The Colored Kentuckian	1867	?			NKAA Entry; Founded and published by Philip H. Murry and J. P. Sampson.
Louisville	Louisville Columbian	1899	1917			NKAA Entry; Edited by L. A. Morris, W. H. Parker, Percy R. Peters, and Jesse B. Colbert.
Louisville	Columbian Herald	1913	1927			NKAA Entry; Edited and published by Percy R. Peters.
Louisville	The Herald Tribune	1937				NKAA Entry; Edited by Charles E. Tucker, William Warley, and Huron Clark.
Louisville	Kentuckian	1870s				NKAA Entry; Edited by Horace Morris.
Louisville	Kentucky Standard	1898	1912			NKAA Entry; Edited by William D. Johnson.
Louisville	The Louisville Defender	1933	current	Weekly	LCCN sn84025907; OCLC 10644972, 2714260	Official page; NKAA Entry
Louisville	Louisville Leader	1917	1953			NKAA Entry; Founded and edited by I. Willis Cole.
Louisville	Louisville News	1913	1947			NKAA Entry; Founded and edited by William Warley; also edited by Lee L. Brown.
Louisville	New South	1894	1897			NKAA Entry; Founded and edited by James E. Givens.
Louisville	The Ohio Falls Express	1878 or 1879	1904	Weekly	LCCN 2014254011, sn84025830; OCLC 10372187, 2755051, 851189446	
Louisville	Tri-weekly Informer	1939	1939			NKAA Entry; Owned and edited by Lucille E. St. Clair, Alice Dunnigan, and M. S. Kimbley.
Louisville	The Louisville Weekly Planet	1872	1875	Weekly	LCCN sn93059170; OCLC 27447816	NKAA Entry; Published by T.F. Cassels and Nathaniel R. Harper.
Louisville	Zion's Banner	?	?			NKAA Entry; Edited by Henry Clay Weeden.
Mt. Sterling	The Reporter	1904	1915			NKAA Entry; Published by John D. and Noah W. Magowan.
Owensboro / Louisville	Kentucky Reporter	1899	1953	Weekly	LCCN sn86069325; OCLC 13922717; ISSN 1943-8923	Free online archive; NKAA Entry; Published by Robert T. and George W. Berry.; Moved from Owensboro to Louisville in 1912.
Owensboro	Sunday Unionist	1890s		Weekly (on Sundays)		
Paducah	Baptist Herald	1873	1878 or 1879			NKAA Entry; Owned and edited by Rev. George W. Dupee.
Paducah	The Kentucky Voice	1988	2010s	Monthly		NKAA Entry; Published by Kathy Robinson.
Paducah	Light House / The Light House	1908 or 1909?	1937	Weekly	OCLC 36062051	NKAA Entry; Published and edited by T.A. Lawrence.
Paducah	The Negro Citizen	?	?			NKAA Entry; Owned and published by Pleasant A. Nichols.
Richmond	Richmond Sentinel	1909	1912			Founded and edited by John Austin Gwynn.
Richmond	Hill Topper	1934	?			Free online archive
Winchester	National Chronicle	1891	1915			NKAA Entry; Published by John H. Ayres.

== See also ==
- List of African American newspapers and media outlets
- List of African American newspapers in Illinois
- List of African American newspapers in Indiana
- List of African American newspapers in Missouri
- List of African American newspapers in Ohio
- List of African American newspapers in Tennessee
- List of African American newspapers in Virginia
- List of African American newspapers in West Virginia
- List of newspapers in Kentucky

== Works cited ==
- Danky, James Philip; Hady, Maureen E., eds. (1998). African-American newspapers and periodicals : a national bibliography. Harvard University Press. ISBN 9780674007888.
- Penn, Irvine Garland (1891). The Afro-American press and its editors. Springfield, Massachusetts: Willey & Company. OCLC 503673564.
- Pride, Armistead Scott; Wilson, Clint C. (1997). A History of the Black Press. Howard University Press. ISBN 9780882581927.
