= The Charlottesville Tribune =

Newspaper in Virginia

Charlottesville Tribune
- Type: Weekly newspaper
- Editor: Fleming E. Alexander, T. J. Sellers
- Launched: 1950
- Ceased publication: 1951
- City: Charlottesville
- Country: United States
- OCLC number: 32252741

The Charlottesville Tribune was a weekly newspaper in Charlottesville, Virginia, that began in 1950 and ran through at least 1951. It is distinct from the Charlottesville-Albemarle Tribune, a separate newspaper with different founders that began publication in 1954.

Written by and for members of Charlottesville's African American community, the Tribune covered local news and events; national news; and commentary, much relating to the status of Black Americans. It is notable for its editorials, often composed by T. J. Sellers, who was a prominent member of the community and a strong voice for integration and interracial collaboration in Charlottesville.

The paper was an offshoot of the Roanoke Tribune and was edited by F. E. Alexander, founder of the Roanoke Tribune, and Charlottesville-born journalist T. J. Sellers.

F. E. Alexander also composed editorials, and these are significant for the precision of arguments and evidence of his particular perspective of how realistic integration efforts are: in one published in January 1951 he noted "our people need a deeper sense of race pride and self respect. Above all they need a sane, sober, and deeper respect for womanhood, particularly the womanhood of our own race."

The broader significance of Sellers' and Alexanders' editorials has to do with their illumination of mid-20th century Charlottesville, a Southern city known for its at times troubled racial history, through the eyes of the African American intellectuals who lived there.
