= Roger Boyle =

Roger Boyle may refer to:

- Roger Boyle, 1st Earl of Orrery (1621–1679), British soldier, statesman and dramatist
- Roger Boyle, 2nd Earl of Orrery (1646–1682), Irish peer and politician
- Roger Boyle (bishop) (1617?–1687), Irish Protestant churchman, Bishop of Down and Connor and of Clogher
- E. Roger Boyle (1908–1993), American author and scholar of drama
