= Chattanooga Observer =

Newspaper in Tennessee

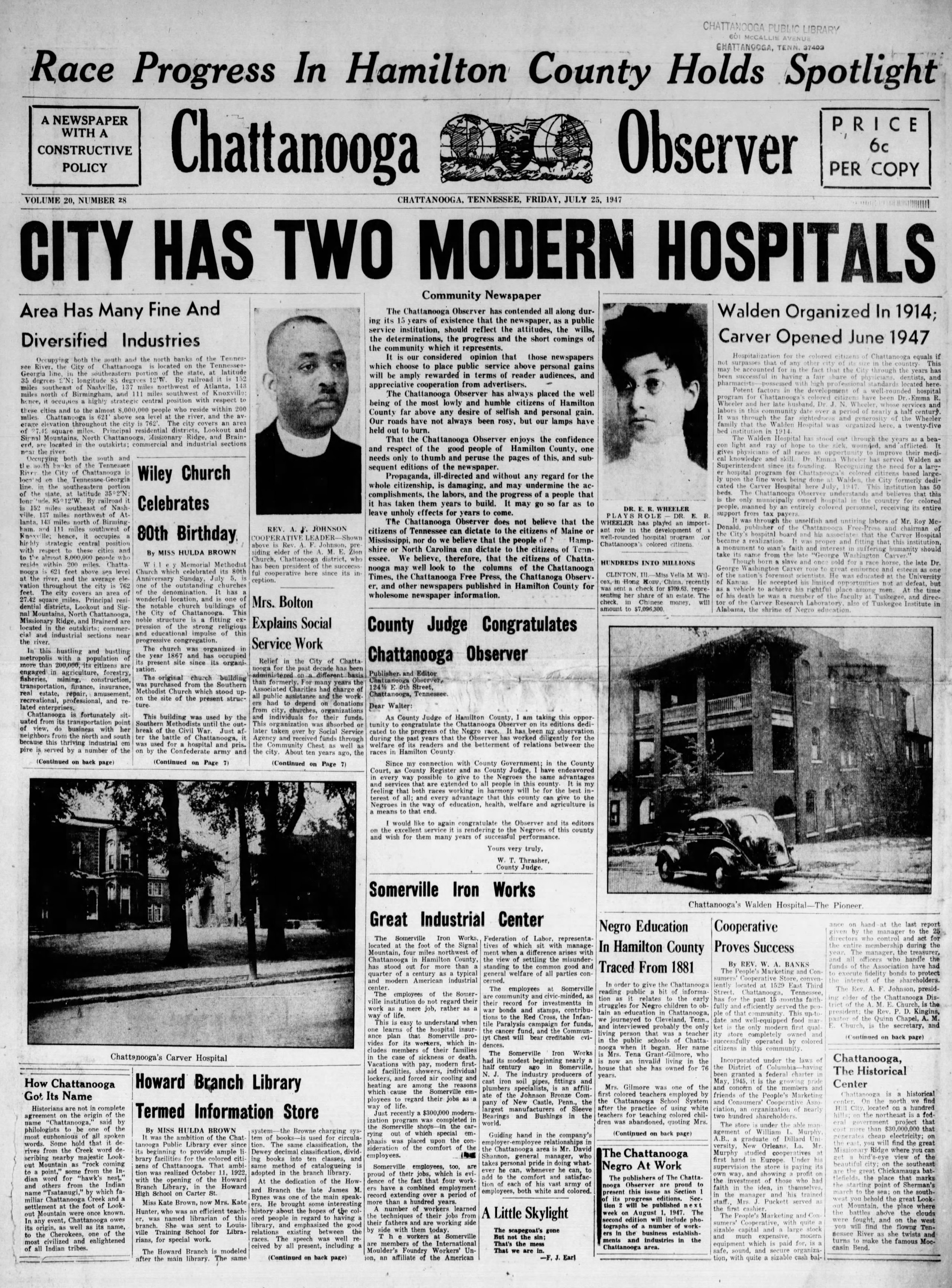
Front page of the Chattanooga Observer, July 25, 1947

The Chattanooga Observer (1927 - 1966) was a weekly newspaper serving the African American community in Chattanooga, Tennessee. It was affiliated with the Republican Party.

The Observer was originally published by the Tennessee Negro News Publishing Co., but by 1940 it had been acquired by the Scott Newspaper Syndicate. By 1943 it had been acquired by the Chattanooga Observer Publishing Company, which was owned by Walter Caldwell Robinson. Robinson, who also edited the newspaper and wrote editorials for it, was the founder of the Colored Voters League of Greater Chattanooga and the chair of the Republican organization in the city's fourth ward until 1959. Ishmael Reed recalled him as "the most powerful Black man in Chattanooga". The paper, which may have played a role in establishing Robinson's political power, had ceased publication by his death.

Tennessee State University has a collection of Robinson's papers including speeches, correspondence and issues of the newspaper. Issues from 1927 to 1962 are also preserved at the Tennessee State Library and Archives.

A different paper by the same name, of which no copies are known to have survived, was published in Chattanooga from 1890 to 1895.

== See also ==
- African-American newspapers
- List of African-American newspapers in Tennessee
