= List of African American newspapers in West Virginia =

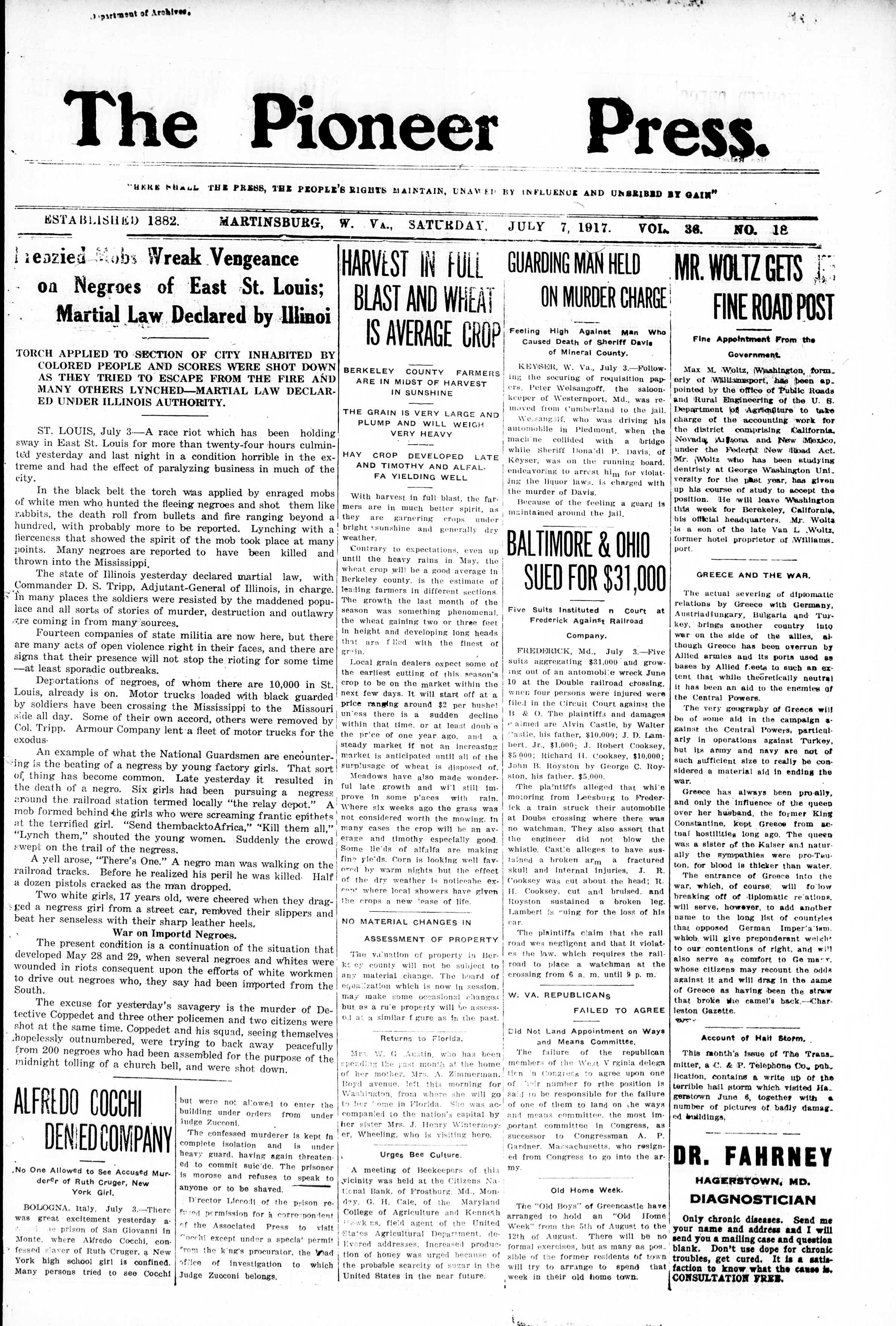
Front page of The Pioneer Press from July 7, 1917, carrying news of the East St. Louis massacre.

This is a list of African American newspapers that have been published in the state of West Virginia. The first such newspaper was The Pioneer Press of Martinsburg, started by J.R. Clifford in 1882. West Virginia's last African American newspaper, the West Virginia Beacon Digest of Charleston, shut down in 2006.

== Newspapers ==
City	Title	Beginning	End	Frequency	Call numbers	Remarks
Bluefield	Independent Observer			Weekly		Circulation of 2,400 in 1951.
Charleston	The Advocate	1901	1913	Weekly	ISSN 2574-6464; LCCN 2011254015, sn85059812; OCLC 664610971, 12920534	Claimed to reach "more colored readers than any newspaper in West Virginia."
Charleston	West Virginia Weekly / The W. Va. Weekly	1933	1935	Weekly	LCCN sn85059878; OCLC 12929891	
Charleston	West Virginia Beacon Digest	1957	2006	Weekly	ISSN 1042-8100; LCCN sn85059870; OCLC 12926221	Only West Virginia African American newspaper in the 21st century.; Published by Stephen R. Starks.
Charleston	West Virginia Digest	1939	1946	Weekly	LCCN sn85059872; OCLC 12926226	
Charleston	West Virginia Enterprise	1885	?	Weekly		Founded by Christopher Payne.
Charleston	West Virginia Weekly	1933	1935	Weekly		Edited by Earl K. Kogar.
Clarksburg	The Clarion	1911	1910s	Weekly	LCCN sn85059700; OCLC 12818724	Ceased publication between 1911 and 1914.; Edited by T.L. Higgins.
Huntington	The Breeze	1920s	1920s			Edited and published by J.W. Scott.
Huntington	Huntington Enterprise	1913				Edited by H. Rufus White.
Huntington	Huntington Times	1918?	?	Weekly	LCCN sn85059761; OCLC 12897649	Edited by A.N. Johnson.
Huntington	West Virginia Spokesman	1900				Founded by C.H. Barnett and edited by J.W. Scott.
Keystone	The McDowell Times	1904	1941	Weekly	ISSN 2640-348X, 2640-3471; LCCN 2018270642, sn86092050; OCLC 1076345227, 13032822, 17762445	Free online archive; Founded by Matthew Thomas Whittico.
Martinsburg	The Pioneer Press	1882	1918	Weekly	ISSN 2640-3722, 2640-3714; LCCN 2014254021, sn83025146; OCLC 876188253, 9285482	Free online archive; Published and edited by J.R. Clifford, the first African American admitted to practice law in West Virginia.
Montgomery	The Mountain Eagle	1890s	1900s	Weekly		Founded by Christopher Payne.
Montgomery	The Pioneer	1890s	1900s	Weekly		Founded by Christopher Payne.

== See also ==
- List of African American newspapers and media outlets
- List of African American newspapers in Maryland
- List of African American newspapers in Ohio
- List of African American newspapers in Pennsylvania
- List of African American newspapers in Virginia
- List of newspapers in West Virginia

== Works cited ==
- Danky, James Philip; Hady, Maureen E., eds. (1998). African-American newspapers and periodicals : a national bibliography. Harvard University Press. ISBN 9780674007888.
- Fain, Cicero M (2019). Black Huntington: An Appalachian Story. University of Illinois Press. ISBN 9780252051432.
- Smith, Jessie Carney; Horton, Carrell Peterson, eds. (1995). Historical Statistics of Black America: Media to Vital Statistics. Gale Research. ISBN 0810393921.
