= List of African American newspapers in Tennessee =

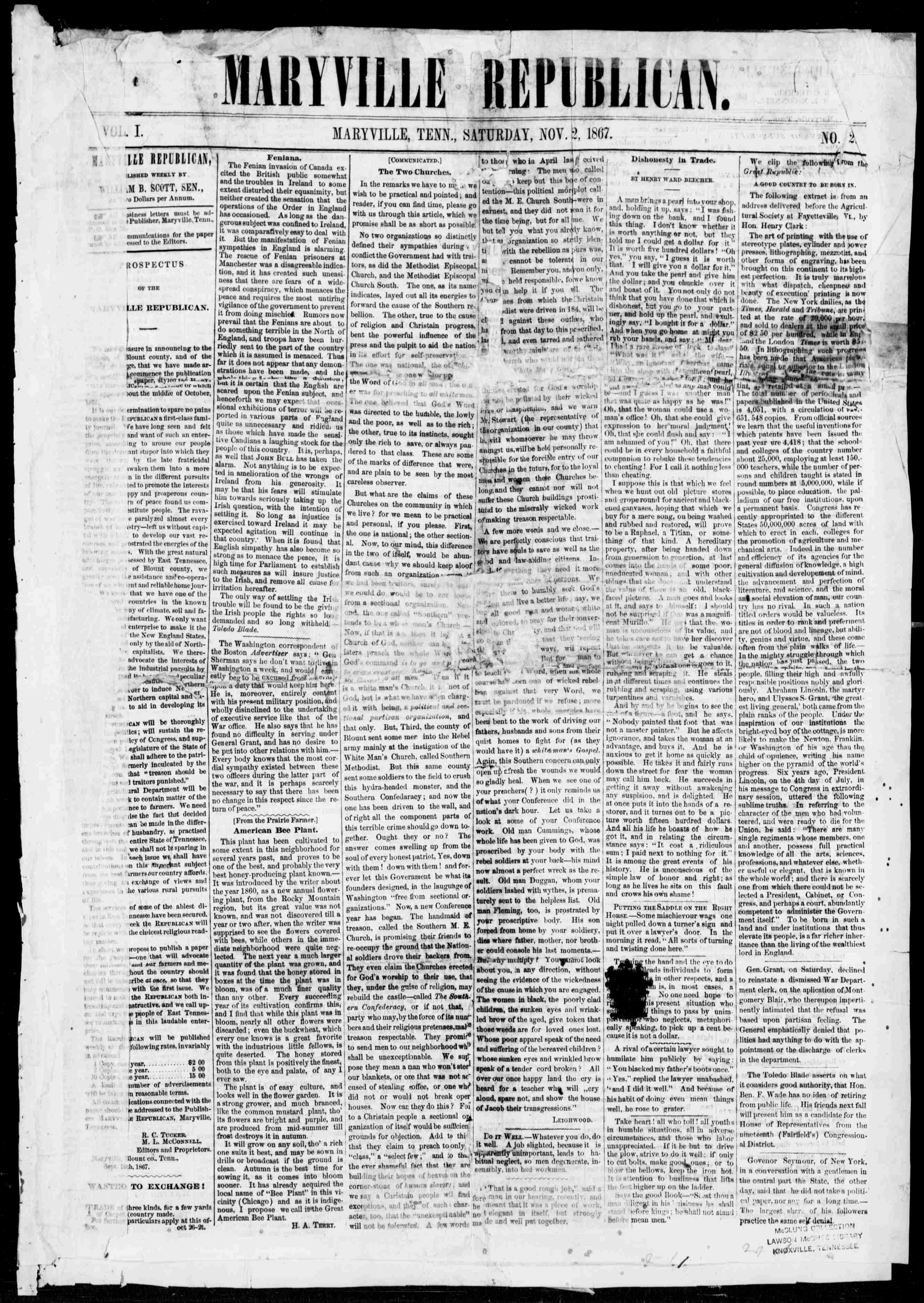
A front page of the Maryville Republican from 1867.

This is a list of African American newspapers that have been published in Tennessee. It includes both current and historical newspapers.

More than 100 such papers have been published in Tennessee. The first was The Colored Tennessean, first published in Nashville on April 29, 1865.

Newspapers currently in publication are highlighted in green in the list below.

== Newspapers ==
City	Title	Beginning	End	Frequency	Call numbers	Remarks
Athens	Watchman	1891	1895			
Chattanooga	The Chattanooga Advocate	1915	1900s	Weekly	LCCN sn98069675; OCLC 38450720	
Chattanooga	Blade; Chattanooga Weekly Blade	1898	1916	Weekly	LCCN sn98069759; OCLC 38790001	
Chattanooga	Citizen	1947	1947			
Chattanooga	Colored Citizen	1908	1911			
Chattanooga	Chattanooga Courier	1990s	1990s	Weekly	LCCN sn98069740; OCLC 38528544	
Chattanooga	Defender	1917	1937			
Chattanooga	The Chattanooga Enterprise	1969	1900s	Weekly	LCCN sn98069739; OCLC 38528548	
Chattanooga	Freeman	1896	1897			
Chattanooga	Harambee	1974	1974			
Chattanooga	Independent Tribune	1886	1886			
Chattanooga	Industrial Searchlight	1899	1903			
Chattanooga	Journal	1973	1974			
Chattanooga	Justice	1887	1887	Weekly	LCCN 2012254032, sn83025741; OCLC 773215976, 9772116	Published by Horn, Wilson & Co.
Chattanooga	News Weekly; Chattanooga News Weekly (1986–1989)	1986	1994	Weekly	LCCN sn98069727, sn98069725; OCLC 38530795, 38530821	
Chattanooga	Sun	1913	1915			
Chattanooga	National Democracy	1918	1921			
Chattanooga	Chattanooga News Chronicle; Chattanooga Chronicle		current	Weekly		Official site
Chattanooga	The Chattanooga North Star	1982	1980s	Weekly	LCCN sn98069729; OCLC 38528862	
Chattanooga	Observer	1890	1895			Distinct from later Observer in 20th century.
Chattanooga	Chattanooga Observer	1927 or 1928?	1966	Weekly	LCCN sn98069710; OCLC 38528642	
Chattanooga	Radiance	1978	1978			
Chattanooga	Southern American	1884	1887			
Chattanooga	Tribune	1928	1931			
Clarksville	News Herald	1913	1917			
Clarksville	Negro Index	1901	1903			
Clarksville	Sun	1950s	1950s			
Columbia	Headlight	1893	1895			
Columbia	Columbia Index	1901	1900s	Monthly newspaper	LCCN sn96091100; OCLC 35671455	
Fayetteville	Advocate	1900	1905			
Fayetteville	Rising Sun	1895	1899			
Franklin	The Black Perspective Inside/Out	1981	1980s	Monthly newspaper	LCCN sn2001062217; OCLC 46326397	Edited by Robert W. Blair.
Gallatin	The Major	1905	1914	Twice monthly	LCCN sn00063979; OCLC 44422728	Attested from at least 1906.
Jackson	Afro-American Sentinel; The Afro-American Sentinel	1890	1890	Weekly	LCCN sn97065526; OCLC 38055132	
Jackson	Afro-American Standard	1903	1906			
Jackson	Community Focus	1985	1987	Weekly	LCCN sn97065547; OCLC 38065912	Edited by Martha Robinson.
Jackson	Gazette	1910	1912			
Jackson	The Jackson Headlight	1899 or 1900	1900	Weekly	LCCN sn83025727; OCLC 2747574, 9765547	
Jackson	The Metro Forum	1989	?	Weekly	LCCN sn97065546; OCLC 28689123	Edited by Bill Marable. Published by Bobby Lee.; Attested through at least 1993.
Jackson	News	1906	1907			
Knoxville	Knoxville Bulletin	1881	?			Founded by William F. Yardley.
Knoxville	Knoxville Crusader	1963	?	Weekly		Edited by G.J. Hill.
Knoxville	The East Tennessee News	1906 or 1908?	1948	Weekly		Published by Webster L. Porter.
Knoxville	The Enlightener	1989	1990s	Weekly	LCCN sn99065874; OCLC 42677301	
Knoxville	Enquirer	1939?	1939?			
Knoxville	The Knoxville Examiner	1982	?	Biweekly	LCCN sn2001062127; OCLC 9395339	
Knoxville	The Examiner	1878	1878			Founded by William F. Yardley.; Free online archive (one issue)
Knoxville	The Knoxville Express	1982	1982	Biweekly	LCCN sn2001062107; OCLC 46313372	Edited by R.J. Booker.
Knoxville	Flashlight Herald	1931	1963			
Knoxville	Gleaner	1891	1900			Founded by printer and attorney James Leonard Smith.
Knoxville	Herald	1927	1935			
Knoxville	Independent Call	1952	1961			
Knoxville	Keyana	1974	1974	Weekly		
Knoxville	The Keyana Spectrum	1974	1975	Weekly	LCCN sn97065166; OCLC 36285544	
Knoxville	Messenger	1908	1910			
Knoxville	Monitor	1944	1954			
Knoxville	The Knoxville Negro World; Negro World; The Weekly Negro World	1887 or 1888	1895 or 1892	Biweekly or weekly	LCCN sn83025748, sn83025753, sn83025767, 2013254339, 2013254338; OCLC 846503914, 846496571, 2753698, 2775113, 2775150, 7263300, 9773383, 9773422, 9773722	Published by Patterson Brothers & Co.
Knoxville	New South	1887	1895			
Knoxville	Public Guide	1934	1938			
Knoxville	Review	1904	1910			
Knoxville	The Righteous Tribe	1973	?	Biweekly	LCCN sn2001062119; OCLC 46839615	
Knoxville	The Knoxville Spectrum	1974 or 1975	1975	Weekly	LCCN sn97065167; OCLC 36285625	
Knoxville	Times	1964	1966			
Knoxville	Voice	1949	1949			
Liberty	Afro-American	1899	1902			
Maryville	Blount County Democrat; Democrat	1879	1882			
Maryville	The Maryville Monitor	1872	1874	Monthly newspaper	LCCN sn85042538; OCLC 12633967	Published by W.B. Scott & Co.
Maryville	Maryville Republican; The Republican	1867	1878 or 1877	Weekly	LCCN 2013218970, sn83025728, 2013218987, sn96091618; OCLC 861797060, 9765605, 192107390, 35070847; ISSN 2331-3196, 2331-320X, 2331-026X, 2331-0278	Free online archives: Maryville Republican (1867–1870, 1876–1877); The Republican (1873–1875)
Memphis	African American Voice	1994?	?	Monthly newspaper	OCLC 30905526	
Memphis	Afro-American	1895	1895			
Memphis	Bluff City News; The Bluff City News	1902 or 1903 or 1904?	1920	Weekly	LCCN sn99063202; OCLC 40742314	"The official organ of the National Negro Bankers Association."
Memphis	Colored Citizen	1900	1921			
Memphis	Dublin Weekly Bulletin	1920	1922			
Memphis	The Greater Memphis & Mid-South Silver Star News	1980s	1998	Weekly	LCCN sn98069854; OCLC 39760189	
Memphis	Head and Hand	1902?	1902?			
Memphis	Headlight	1886	1888			
Memphis	Memphis Free Speech and Headlight; Memphis Free Speech	1888	1892			Edited by Ida B. Wells starting in 1889.; Received national attention for its coverage of the People's Grocery lynchings in 1892.; No copies survive.
Memphis	Index	1923	1936			
Memphis	The Jerusalem Chronicle	1990	current	Monthly	OCLC 28510624	Official feed; Edited by Yehoshaphat Ben Israel.
Memphis	Journal	1936	1938			
Memphis	Mid-South Express	1979	1980s	Weekly	LCCN sn98069864; OCLC 39891897	Published by M. Latroy A. Williams Publishing Co.
Memphis	The Mid-South Tribune	1996		Weekly	LCCN sn2005062331; OCLC 52074108	
Memphis	Mid-Weekly Progress	1905	1910			
Memphis	The Moon Illustrated Weekly	1905 or 1906	1906	Weekly	LCCN sn91028333; OCLC 6429985	Published by Ed L. Simon & Co. Edited by W.E.B. DuBois.
Memphis	The New Tri-State Defender	1961	1967	Weekly	LCCN 00225459; OCLC 43855974	
Memphis	Outlook	1902	1906 + 1920s			
Memphis	Record	1920	1922			
Memphis	Scimitar	1898	1900			
Memphis	The Memphis Sentinel	1940	1900s	Weekly	LCCN sn2003062313; OCLC 53897427	
Memphis	Signal	1901	1916			
Memphis	The Memphis Silver Star News	1980s	1989	Weekly	LCCN sn98069853; OCLC 39760107	
Memphis	Star Times	1954	1957			
Memphis	Sun	1913	1913			
Memphis	Times	1918	1937			
Memphis	The Times-Herald	1959	1900s	Weekly	LCCN sn2003062305; OCLC 53895820	
Memphis	Tri-State Defender; The Tri-State Defender	1951	current	Weekly	LCCN sn83045432, 00225460; OCLC 43855926, 9578018	Official site
Memphis	The Tri-state Tribune	1920s or 1930	1932	Weekly	LCCN sn93059243; OCLC 27776413	
Memphis	Memphis Triangle	1920s or 1930	1932	Weekly	LCCN 2013254317; OCLC 664611317	Billed as the "[l]argest circulated Negro weekly newspaper in the Mid-South."
Memphis	Memphis Watchman	1884?	1889?	Weekly		Edited by J. Thomas Turner.
Memphis	Weekly Planet	1872	1872	Weekly		
Memphis	Memphis World	1931	1972	Twice weekly or weekly	LCCN sn83025697; OCLC 9750336	
Morristown	Reporter	1920	1921			
Murfreesboro	The Murfreesboro News	1954 or 1956	1966	Monthly newspaper	OCLC 36168311	Published by Pearl Wade.
Murfreesboro	The Murfreesboro Union	1920	1900s		LCCN 2013254328, sn96091136; OCLC 36001549, 664611329	Attested through at least 1939.
Nashville	780 Countdown	1962	1964			
Nashville	The Block Bulletin	1947 or 1950	1950s	Monthly newspaper	LCCN sn97065571; OCLC 38124458	Published by Solid Block. Edited by George W. Harvey.
Nashville	Capitol City Defender; Capital City Defender	1963	1965	Twice monthly	LCCN sn89080014; OCLC 22355703	Published by H.C. Savage.
Nashville	Citizen	1893	1905			
Nashville	The City Examiner	1960 or 1962	1962?	Weekly	LCCN sn89080028; OCLC 22369703	Published and edited by Mrs. W.A. Mason.
Nashville	Nashville Clarion	1896 or 1902	1937	Weekly	LCCN sn86071216; OCLC 13301050	Attested through at least 1931.
Nashville	The Colored Tennessean	1865	1866 or 1867	Weekly	LCCN 2011254352; OCLC 747721291	First African American newspaper in Tennessee, first published April 29, 1865.; Founded by William B. Scott.
Nashville	The Nashville Commentator	1948	1971	Weekly	LCCN sn88061123; OCLC 18003980	
Nashville	Corner Stone	1881	1892			
Nashville	The Nashville Defender	1938	1943	Weekly	LCCN sn89080026; OCLC 22369434	Edited by D.J. Fabree.
Nashville	The Ebony Gazette	1975	1976	Weekly	LCCN sn89080015; OCLC 22355796	Edited by Norman G. Simons.
Nashville	Emigration Herald	1879	1879			
Nashville	Free Lance	1885	1887			
Nashville	Nashville Globe And Independent; The Nashville Globe and Independent	1930s	1960	Weekly	LCCN sn86071168; OCLC 13227300	Formed by the merger of the Nashville Globe and Nashville Independent.
Nashville	The Nashville Globe	1906	1930s	Weekly	LCCN 2014218453, sn86064259; OCLC 13744970, 881287661; ISSN 2373-4892, 2373-4906	Free online archive; Merged with the Nashville Independent to form the Nashville Globe and Independent.
Nashville	The Herald Examiner	1976	1976	Biweekly or irregular	LCCN sn2002062623; OCLC 50137872	Published by Robert J. Sye.
Nashville	Herald and Pilot	1879	1879			
Nashville	Independence News	1972	?	Biweekly		Published by the Nashville Urban League.
Nashville	Nashville Independent	1929 or 1931	1938	Weekly	LCCN sn89080023; OCLC 22369421	Merged with Nashville Globe to become the Nashville Globe and Independent.
Nashville	Metropolitan	1979	1979			
Nashville	Metropolitan Times	1980	1997	Weekly	LCCN sn00063928; OCLC 29736253	Published by Latham Communications, Inc. Edited by Bruce Honick.
Nashville	Metropolitan Weekly	1980	1980s	Irregular	LCCN sn96091090; OCLC 35332442	
Nashville	The Mid-State Observer	1978	1970s	Weekly or irregular	LCCN sn96091078; OCLC 35332404	Published by The Eagle Press. Edited by Lou Taylor.
Nashville	Neighborhood Times	1959	1962	Monthly newspaper (two summer months combined)	LCCN sn96091079; OCLC 5516773	
Nashville	News	1914	1918			
Nashville	Nashville News-Star	1960	1961	Weekly	LCCN sn89080030; OCLC 22369762	
Nashville	Palladium	1883	1909			
Nashville	Nashville P.R.I.D.E; Nashville Pride	1988	current	Weekly	LCCN sn2002062624; OCLC 29840361	Official site; Founded by Larry Davis and Cynthia Hodge.
Nashville	The Nashville Sun	1950	?	Weekly	LCCN sn89080027; OCLC 22369636	Published by Central Southern Publishing Co., Inc. Edited by L.D. Williams (1950) and W.N. Daniel (1951).
Nashville	The Tennessean; The Colored Tennessean	1865 or 1866	1867 or 1866	Weekly	LCCN sn83025745, sn83025746; OCLC 2623202, 2775341, 9773024, 9773080	Published by Scott, Waring and Co. Edited by W.B. Scott.
Nashville	The Tennessee Star	1886	1891	Weekly	LCCN sn83025747; OCLC 2775369, 9773331	Edited by George T. Robinson.
Nashville	Sun	1950	1951			
Nashville	Times Mirror Tennessee	1997	1998	Weekly	LCCN sn00063927; OCLC 38507603	
Nashville	Tribune	1912	1913			
Nashville	The Tennessee Tribune	1992	current	Weekly	LCCN sn93002386, sn9302386; OCLC 27259983; ISSN 1067-5280	Official site
Nashville	Uplift	1973	1976			
Nashville	The Urban Journal	1998	?	Weekly	LCCN sn98002469; OCLC 39925470; ISSN 1521-9038	
Nashville	Weekly Pilot	1878 / 1879	1879 / 1879			
Nashville	Nashville World	1932	1938	Weekly	LCCN sn89080025; OCLC 22369425	
Nashville	Yours	1949	1949			
Paris	Headlight	1909	1911			
Winchester	Negro Enterprise	1899	1900			

== See also ==
- List of African American newspapers and media outlets
- List of African American newspapers in Alabama
- List of African American newspapers in Arkansas
- List of African American newspapers in Georgia
- List of African American newspapers in Kentucky
- List of African American newspapers in Mississippi
- List of African American newspapers in Missouri
- List of African American newspapers in North Carolina
- List of African American newspapers in Virginia
- List of newspapers in Tennessee

== Works cited ==
- Brown, Karen Fitzgerald (1982). The Black Press of Tennessee: 1865-1980 (Ph.D. thesis). University of Tennessee.
- Danky, James Philip; Hady, Maureen E., eds. (1998). African-American newspapers and periodicals : a national bibliography. Harvard University Press. ISBN 9780674007888.
- Shannon, Samuel (1983). "Tennessee". In Suggs, Henry Lewis (ed.). The Black Press in the South, 1865–1979. ISBN 9780313222443.
