= Sarah Boyle =

Sarah Boyle may refer to:

- Sarah Boyle (1609–1633), daughter of Richard Boyle, 1st Earl of Cork
- Sarah Patton Boyle (1906–1994), American author and civil rights activist
