= List of African American newspapers in Ohio =

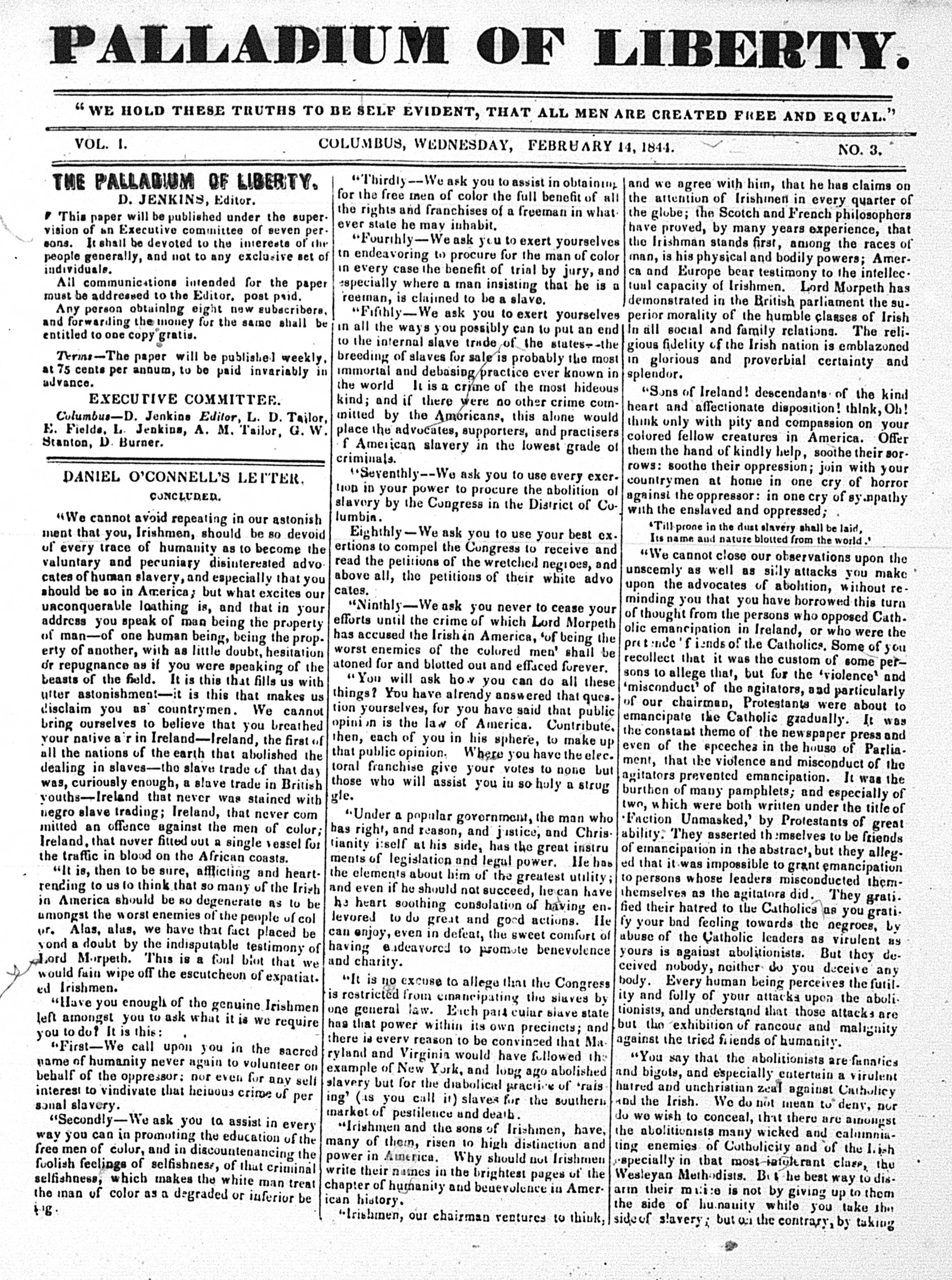
An 1844 issue of the Palladium of Liberty.

This is a list of African American newspapers that have been published in the state of Ohio.

The history of African American publishing in Ohio is longer than in many Midwestern states, beginning well before the Civil War. In 1843, the Palladium of Liberty became Ohio's first African American newspaper. It was followed by The Aliened American in Cleveland in the 1850s, and by the Cincinnati Colored Citizen in 1863, which was one of the few African American newspapers published during the Civil War.

Notable African American newspapers currently published in Ohio include the Akron Reporter, The Cincinnati Herald, the Cleveland Call and Post, The Toledo Journal, and the Youngstown Buckeye Review.

== Newspapers ==
City	Title	Beginning	End	Frequency	Call numbers	Remarks
Akron	The Reporter	1969	current	Weekly	LCCN sn84024228; OCLC 11304626	Official site; Issues online
Cincinnati	The Afro-American	1882	?	Weekly		One issue available online; Extant through at least 1885.
Cincinnati	American Catholic Tribune	1884 or 1885	1890s	Irregular	LCCN sn90057162, sn97016092; OCLC 10874710, 37188414	"[T]he only newspaper in the country for black Catholics".; Published in Detroit for portions of 1893 and 1894.
Cincinnati	Colored Patriot	1883?	?	Weekly	LCCN sn84028752; OCLC 11416184	Billed as "the only Colored Republican paper published or printed in Cincinnati."
Cincinnati	The Cincinnati Crusader	1981	?	Monthly newspaper	OCLC 16752125	Extant through at least 1987.
Cincinnati	The Cincinnati Herald	1955	current	Weekly	LCCN sn84024231; OCLC 11309100	Official site
Cincinnati	Colored Citizen	1863	1869 or 1873	Weekly	LCCN sn83027095; OCLC 10005063	One issue available online; Staff included Peter H. Clark.
Cincinnati	The Ohio Enterprise	1902	1906	Weekly	OCLC 31314138	Founded by Wendell Dabney.
Cincinnati	Cincinnati Union	1907	1952	Weekly	LCCN sn84024489; OCLC 10206796	Founded by Wendell Dabney.
Cincinnati	News Recorder	1893				
Cincinnati	Voice of the People	1896				
Cleveland	Cleveland Advocate / Advocate (1915–1918)	1914	1924	Weekly	LCCN sn83035391; OCLC 9755074, 2611292	Published by Ormond Forte, known as the "dean of Cleveland Negro newspapermen".
Cleveland	Aliened American	1853	1854 or 1856	Weekly	LCCN sn83035397; OCLC 9777824, 2622997	
Cleveland	Call and Post	1919	current	Weekly	Main (Cleveland) edition: ISSN 0045-4036; LCCN sn85042478; OCLC 9793218; Columbus edition: LCCN sn84024225; OCLC 11283002; Cincinnati edition: LCCN sn88077398; OCLC 17937562	Official site; Columbus edition published from 1962.; Cincinnati edition published from 1967.
Cleveland	Cleveland Community News / The Greater Cleveland Community News	1968		Weekly		Official site
Cleveland	The Cleveland Gazette	1883	1945	Weekly	LCCN sn83035388; OCLC 9754948, 9754970, 9754999	Founded by Harry Clay Smith.; Became the longest-publishing African American weekly in the country.
Cleveland	The Cleveland Globe	1884	1887			Founded by Richard A. Jones.
Cleveland	The Cleveland Guide	1929	?	Weekly		Extant through at least 1937.
Cleveland	Cleveland Herald	1819	1837	Weekly		
Cleveland	Inner-City Voice	1970	?	Monthly	LCCN sn93023822; OCLC 28695123	
Cleveland	The Cleveland Journal	1903	1913 or 1912	Weekly	LCCN sn83035389; OCLC 9755018	Circulation of 2500.
Cleveland	The Cleveland Metro	1959?	?	Weekly		Extant through at least 1986.
Cleveland	Eastside Daily News	1980	current	Three times a week		Official site
Cleveland	The Real Deal	1991	current	Monthly newspaper		Official site
Cleveland	Voice of the People	1895				
Columbus	Columbus Advocate	1933	?	Weekly	LCCN sn88077643; OCLC 18385228	Extant through at least 1940.
Columbus	The Challenge	1942	?	Unknown		
Columbus	The Columbus Challenger	1963	1975	Monthly (irregular) newspaper	LCCN sn84024220, sn84024980; OCLC 11271910, 11441015	
Columbus	The Free American	1887	1888	Weekly	LCCN sn85042465; OCLC 2611051, 12497479	Columbus' first African American newspaper since the Palladium of Liberty.
Columbus	The Lamp	1994		Monthly newspaper	OCLC 31873854	
Columbus	The Columbus Minority Communicator	1996?		Weekly	OCLC 35719248	Official site
Columbus	Onyx / Columbus Onyx News	1971	1978?	Weekly	LCCN sn88077700, sn88077701, sn88077699; OCLC 18385720, 18385976, 18385710	
Columbus	Palladium of Liberty	1843	1844	Weekly	LCCN sn84024997; OCLC 11424731	First known African American newspaper in Ohio.
Columbus	The Columbus Post	1995	current	Weekly		Founded in 1995 by Amos Lynch after leaving the Call and Post.
Columbus	The Columbus Recorder	1923	?	Monthly newspaper	LCCN sn88077650; OCLC 18385332	
Columbus	The Ohio Sentinel	1949	1963	Weekly	LCCN sn84024219; OCLC 11262867	
Columbus	Columbus Standard	1889 or 1901	1901	Weekly	LCCN sn84025831, 2011254355; OCLC 10372298, 2639468, 747721376	Published by P.W. Chavers.
Columbus	Ohio State Monitor	1918	1922	Weekly	LCCN sn88077669; OCLC 18385530	
Columbus	The Ohio State News	1935	1952	Weekly	LCCN sn84024236; OCLC 11323208, 2714273	
Columbus	The Columbus Voice	1928	1933?	Weekly	LCCN sn88077652; OCLC 18385356	Published by Florence W. Oakfield.
Columbus	Whip-Poor-Will	1866	1866	Monthly	LCCN sn88077684; OCLC 18385623	
Dayton	Dayton / Black Press	1972?	?	Weekly	LCCN sn89080115; OCLC 25568374	Extant through at least 1980.
Dayton	Dayton Tattler	1890	1891	Weekly	LCCN sn88077203; OCLC 17538409	Founded by Paul Laurence Dunbar.; Printed initially in the Wright Brothers print shop.
Dayton	The Daily Bulletin: Combined with The Ohio Express	1941	?	Daily (except Sunday)	OCLC 2696651	Extant through at least 1946.
Dayton	Dayton Communicator	1994?		Weekly	OCLC 32480684	
Dayton	The Dayton Defender / New Dayton Defender	1986?	current	Biweekly	LCCN sn90068203; OCLC 21191588	Now part of Sesh Communications, which also publishes the Cincinnati Herald.
Dayton	The Dayton Forum	1913	1949	Biweekly	LCCN sn84024234; OCLC 11323316	
Dayton	New Dayton Express	1964	1971	Weekly	LCCN sn84024237, sn84024238; OCLC 11321996, 2696826, 11322054	
Dayton	The Ohio Daily Express	1943?	1955	Daily (except Sunday)	LCCN sn88077225; OCLC 17538515	
Dayton	The Soul/phisticator	1986?	?	Unknown		Associated with the WDAO AM radio station.
East Cleveland	East Cleveland Citizen	1970	?	Unknown	LCCN sn83035685; OCLC 10249181	
Hamilton	Butler County American	1940	1969	Weekly	LCCN sn89075005; OCLC 19000390	Succeeded by the Fort Hamilton American.
Lima	Lima Post	1953	1956	Weekly	LCCN sn90068005; OCLC 10126338	Billed as “Lima’s Only Negro Newspaper.”
Toledo	The Observer	1918?	?	Weekly		
Toledo	Toledo Bronze Raven	1949 or 1953	1976	Weekly	LCCN sn84024175; OCLC 2564711	
Toledo	The Toledo Journal	1975	current	Weekly	LCCN sn90068216; OCLC 19061805	Official site
Toledo	The Toledo Script	1943	1949	Weekly	LCCN sn84024222; OCLC 11276680	
Toledo	The Toledo Sepia City Press	1948	?	Weekly	LCCN sn24224; OCLC 11276587	Extant through at least 1950.
Urbana	The Informer	1897	1900s	Monthly newspaper	LCCN sn87076946; OCLC 17246766	Founded by Elmer W.B. Curry of the Curry Institute.; Extant through at least 1925.
Xenia	Ohio Standard and Observer	1897	1903	Weekly	LCCN sn84025822; OCLC 2577080	
Xenia	Xenia Sentinel	1911	?	Weekly	LCCN sn91069721; OCLC 23978734	
Youngstown	The Buckeye Review	1937	current	Weekly	ISSN 0045-3285; LCCN sn78001573; OCLC 3989242	Official site
Youngstown	Mahoning Valley Challenger	1967	1974	Weekly	LCCN sn88078359; OCLC 1769494	

== See also ==
- List of African American newspapers and media outlets
- List of African American newspapers in Indiana
- List of African American newspapers in Michigan
- List of African American newspapers in Pennsylvania
- List of African American newspapers in West Virginia
- List of newspapers in Ohio

== Works cited ==
- Danky, James Philip; Hady, Maureen E., eds. (1998). African-American newspapers and periodicals : a national bibliography. Harvard University Press. ISBN 9780674007888.
- Gutgesell, Stephen (1974). Guide to Ohio Newspapers, 1793-1973 : Union Bibliography of Ohio Newspapers Available in Ohio Libraries. Ohio Historical Society.
- Jeffres, Leo W. (1982). "Grassroots Journalism in the City: Cleveland's Neighborhood Newspapers" (PDF).
- Penn, Irvine Garland (1891). The Afro-American Press and Its Editors. Willey & Company.
- Pride, Armistead Scott; Wilson, Clint C. (1997). A History of the Black Press. Howard University Press. ISBN 9780882581927.
- Ross, Felecia G. Jones (1996). "Democracy's Textbook: A History of the Black Press in Ohio, 1865-1985". In Suggs, Henry Lewis (ed.). The Black Press in the Middle West, 1865-1985. Greenwood Press. ISBN 9780313255793.
