= Joseph T. Wilson =

American journalist, politician, and author

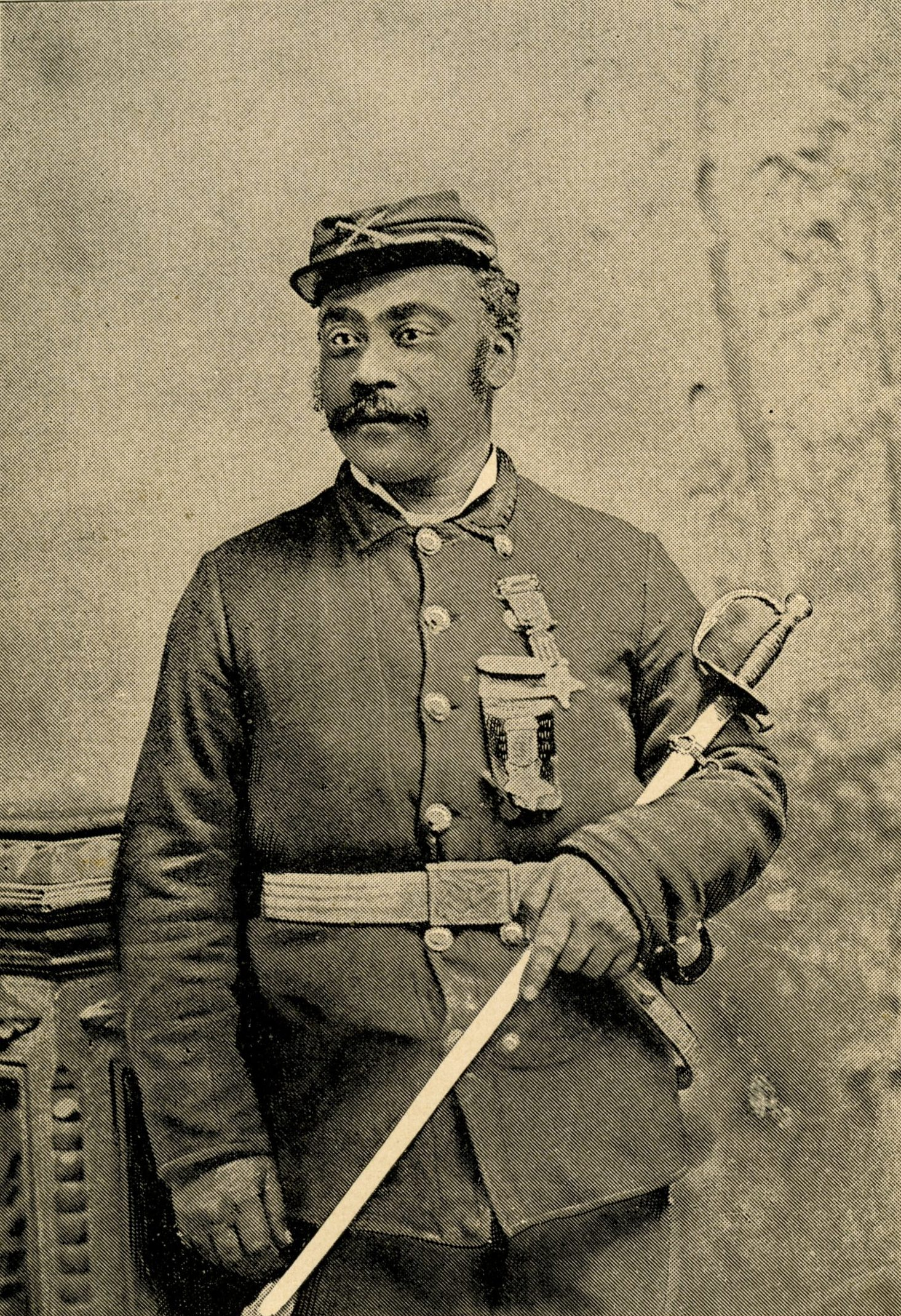
- Wilson as depicted in The Black Phalanx (1888)
- Born: c. 1837; Norfolk, Virginia, US
- Died: September 25, 1891
- Other names: J.T. Wilson
- Known for: Activism, writing, lecturing
- Notable work: The Black Phalanx

Joseph Thomas Wilson (c. 1837 – September 25, 1891) was an American journalist, politician, and author. He served in several regiments, including the 54th Massachusetts Infantry Regiment, during the American Civil War. After the war's end, he was the publisher of several Reconstruction-era publications and a radical member of the Republican Party, active on a state level. Wilson was also a successful author; his 1888 The Black Phalanx sold well and has been described as the "most comprehensive study of African American military service" of the era.

== Biography ==
Joseph T. Wilson was born in 1836 or January 1837 in Norfolk, Virginia. He may have been enslaved at birth; his mother, Louisa Wilson, was likely free and his father, Bristow, enslaved. He was later described as "mulatto". He left Norfolk after turning in a fugitive put his safety in danger and attended schools in New Bedford, Massachusetts.

According to his writings, Wilson was out of the nation on a whaling ship for what was to be three years. He learnt of the outbreak of the American Civil War when the ship docked in Valparaíso, Chile, in 1862, and quickly returned to the US. He spent three days serving in a regiment from New York in the war. He was forced to leave the regiment after they realized he was Black. So Wilson instead traveled to New Orleans, where his father had been sold, and enlisted in the 2nd Louisiana Native Guard Infantry Regiment, on September 30, 1862. As part of the regiment he fought in the Siege of Port Hudson. Wilson suffered from chronic diarrhea, at one point hospitalized and was eventually honorably discharged. After moving back to Massachusetts, Wilson enlisted in the 54th Massachusetts Infantry Regiment, Company C. He was discharged on May 8, 1864, after having been injured in the Battle of Olustee in February 1864. In September 1864 he was involved in the attempted capture of Fort Fisher as a boat pilot. For a time after this Wilson was a member of the Army of the James' secret service.

Though Wilson was permanently disabled after his injury in the Battle of Olustee, his attempts to receive a pension, which began as early as November 1864 and continued for the next 25 years were unsuccessful into the 1880s. He married Elizabeth Hattie Smith on March 19, 1868; the couple had three children but none survived past childhood.

In early 1865 he moved back to Norfolk and initially found work in a supply store before taking editorship of The True Southerner. He was in a group that formed the Colored Monitor Union Club on April 4, 1865, a group advocating for suffrage that voted in the elections on May 25. Their votes were not counted. He was elected to serve on a committee of eight that drafted the "Address from the Colored Citizens of Norfolk, Virginia, to the People of the United States" in June 1865. The address advocated for equality of Black people with white and particularly in favor of equal suffrage. It warned that former slaveowners would deprive freed slaves of their rights, which they were willing to work hard to secure. It also proposed land associations to allow African-Americans to purchase land.

In April 1866, after black residents of Norfolk assembled for a parade and meeting to celebrate the Civil Rights Act of 1866, white residents rioted. Wilson was still The True Southerner's editor at the time and used his April 19, 1866, issue to defend Black civil rights and the celebration. White vigilantes responded by destroying Wilson's press, making the April 19 issue of The True Southerner the last. He then left the region to settle in Petersburg, Virginia. There, he founded and published the short-lived paper The Union Republican in 1867. In the 1870s he returned to Norfolk and worked for a time for the Internal Revenue Service, gauging and inspecting customs, and at one point was colonel aide-de-camp to the commander of the Grand Army of the Republic. Returning to Petersburg, Wilson published The American Sentinel and The Right Way in the 1880s.

Wilson was politically active as a member of the Republican Party. After the 1867 Reconstruction Acts were enacted, he participated in many party events, with what Elizabeth Varon describes as a "radical voice", being elected to the Norfolk City Council in 1870 and unsuccessfully running for Congress six years later. He campaigned for Ulysses S. Grant in the 1872 election and cast a vote for Rutherford B. Hayes four years later as a presidential elector. His house was attacked in 1871 for his activism. Wilson continued to advocate vocally for the rights of Black people, speaking and publishing widely. He criticized the Readjuster Party.

== History work ==
Following the end of the Civil War, Wilson embarked on research into Black history. He published Emancipation: Its Course and Progress in 1882, charting Black history from 1481 BC, which he identified as the year of an exodus, to 1875 AD. The historian Earl E. Thorpe, in an analysis of Wilson's work, described the book as "a very crude effort" and noted the difficulty of covering 3000 years of history in 242 pages. Also in 1882 Wilson was delegated with the task of writing a history of the regiment he served with by the Grand Army of the Republic. The work that emerged from this was The Black Phalanx, published in 1888 and covering the history of Black soldiers in the American Revolutionary War, War of 1812, and American Civil War. Nineteen chapters and 528 pages long, the book also has biographical sketches of prominent figures. Just two of those chapters cover the American Revolution and War of 1812; the remaining seventeen focused on the Civil War. This book had three total editions published. The American Publishing Company sought to make the book a success, with a door-to-door campaign, subscription sales, agent selling, and widely advertising. Their efforts were successful; the educator Irvine Garland Penn wrote three years later that sales "surpass[ed] that of any other work written by an Afro-American."

Thorpe thought Wilson's coverage of the first two wars had "nothing new", but the later ones used credible sources but suffered from excessive quotation (around half of the book) and numerous grammatical mistakes. It also lacked an index. The public positively received it, and the work was lauded as his magnum opus upon his death. Nine years later the book was exhibited at the Exposition Universelle in Paris. Historians Arthur Schomburg and John Edward Bruce deemed it a foundational text in its field in 1911. Carter G. Woodson wrote in 1944 that it had "shaped" his "historical consciousness" according to Varon.

== Later life and death ==
Wilson died on September 25, 1891. Despite its early success and influence, Varon wrote in 2019 that The Black Phalanx had received little critical attention in the modern era; Wilson himself has often been "overshadowed" by George Washington Williams. According to the scholar Donald Yacovone, the book was the "most comprehensive study of African American military service" for at least a generation after its publication.

== Bibliography ==
- Yacovone, Donald (2004). ""Public Opinion" Joseph T. Wilson". Freedom's journey : African American voices of the Civil War. Chicago : Lawrence Hill Books. pp. 335–337. ISBN 978-1-56976-993-5.
- Thorpe, Earl E. (1971). "Joseph T. Wilson". Black historians; a critique. New York, Morrow. pp. 44–45.
- Trudeau, Noah Andre (2002). Like men of war : Black troops in the Civil War, 1862-1865. Edison, N.J. : Castle Books. ISBN 978-0-7858-1476-4.
- Aptheker, Herbert (1991). To be free : pioneering studies in Afro-American history. New York : Citadel Press. ISBN 978-0-8065-1257-0.
- Varon, Elizabeth (March 6, 2019). "Joseph T. Wilson's The Black Phalanx". In Cushman, Stephen; Gallagher, Gary W. (eds.). Civil War Writing: New Perspectives on Iconic Texts. LSU Press. ISBN 978-0-8071-7101-1.
- Parfait, Claire (September 13, 2016). ""The Grandest Book Ever Written": Advertising Joseph T. Wilson's Black Phalanx (1888)". In Parfait, Claire; Dantec-Lowry, Hélène Le; Bourhis-Mariotti, Claire (eds.). Writing History from the Margins: African Americans and the Quest for Freedom. Taylor & Francis. ISBN 978-1-317-19961-8.
- Long, Richard A. (1988). Black writers and the American Civil War. Blue & Grey Press. ISBN 978-1-55521-248-3.
- Wilson, Joseph T. The Project Gutenberg EBook of The Black Phalanx
