= Lewis Ossie Swingler =

American journalist

Lewis Ossie Swingler (August 28, 1906 – September 25, 1962) was a pioneering African-American journalist, editor, and newspaper publisher from Crittenden County, Arkansas. He was editor of the Memphis World and editor in chief and copublisher of the Tri-State Defender.

== Early life ==
Swingler was born in Crittenden County in 1905. He was raised in Tulsa, Oklahoma, where he attended Booker T. Washington High School. Swingler went on to attend the University of Nebraska (NU), where he graduated with a degree in journalism. While in college, Swingler helped organize the first chapter of Alpha Phi Alpha at NU and edited the Sphinx, a publication of that fraternity.

== Career ==
Directly after graduating, Swingler moved to Memphis, Tennessee, where he was a pivotal figure in the establishment of the Memphis World. He served as its editor from its founding in 1931 until he left in 1951 to start the Tri-State Defender with John H. Sengstacke. During this period Swingler also taught journalism at LeMoyne College.

Swingler used his position in Memphis's black community to advocate for civil rights. For instance, in 1948 Swingler and a number of other prominent black citizens of Memphis pressed the police department to hire African American officers as a way of reducing police brutality. This effort was ultimately successful. Swingler also joined an early voter registration group, Joseph Edison Walker's Non-Partisan Voters Committee, in 1951.

In 1956, during the Montgomery bus boycott, Swingler was the southern vice president of Alpha Phi Alpha. After fellow Alpha Martin Luther King Jr. was indicted in Montgomery, Swingler was among a delegation which travelled there to support King.

Swingler died on September 25, 1962, in Mound Bayou, Mississippi, of a heart attack.
