= The Cincinnati Herald =

African-American weekly newspaper in Ohio

- Type: Weekly African-American newspaper
- Owner: Sesh Communications
- Publisher: Walter L. White
- Founded: 1955
- Language: English
- Headquarters: Avondale, Cincinnati, Ohio
- City: Cincinnati, Ohio
- Country: United States
- Sister newspapers: The Dayton Defender
- Website: thecincinnatiherald.com

The Cincinnati Herald is an African-American newspaper published each Wednesday by Sesh Communications in Cincinnati, Ohio, United States. The Herald's offices are located in the Avondale neighborhood. Sister publications include The Dayton Defender, The Northern Kentucky Herald, and SeshPrime Magazine, a monthly magazine for African-Americans.

== History ==
The Herald was founded in 1955 by Gerald Porter. When Porter died in 1963, his wife Marjorie Parham assumed control of the paper. In 1996, Parham sold the paper to Sesh Communications, a partnership between Eric Kearney, Jan-Michele Lemon, Wilton Blake, and Ronda Gooden. In 2026, the paper announced it had paused production.

== See also ==
- List of African-American newspapers in Ohio
