= Randolph Lewis White =

American newspaper publisher

Randolph Lewis White (1896–1991) was an African American newspaper publisher, hospital administrator, and civil-rights activist in Charlottesville, Virginia.

White founded the Charlottesville-Albemarle Tribune, a newspaper serving Charlottesville's African American community, in 1954, and ran it all the way until his death at age 95. The newspaper played an important role in the intense clashes over desegregation in the Charlottesville schools, particularly in its editorial pages, which argued strongly for integration.

White's efforts to desegregate Charlottesville extended well beyond the newspaper. He worked in administration at the University of Virginia Hospital, and was part of the successful fight to desegregate that hospital's patient wardsl.
