= Negro World (Knoxville) =

Negro World Weekly Negro World New South
- Publisher: Patterson, Elms & Co.
- Founded: 1887
- Language: English
- City: Knoxville, Tennessee, U.S.

Negro World, also known as the Weekly Negro World, was an African American newspaper published in 1887 in Knoxville, Tennessee. It was published by Patterson, Elms & Co. During a two-week period it was issued daily as an advertising medium. In 1893, the paper's name changed to New South, and Joseph M. Trigg served as the publisher.

Irvine Garland Penn was a correspondent for the paper.

== See also ==
- List of African-American newspapers in Tennessee
