= Scott Newspaper Syndicate =

Newspaper syndication business

The Scott Newspaper Syndicate (originally the Southern Newspaper Syndicate) was a conglomeration or chain of African-American newspapers. It existed between 1931 and 1955, and at its height, it employed hundreds of workers and contributed to more than 240 papers.

== Origins ==
William Alexander Scott Jr founded the Atlanta World in 1928. The paper first published every week, but after two years, it was converted into a semiweekly publication. Scott began a print syndication business (or newspaper chain) called the Southern Newspaper Syndicate on January 1, 1931, which he renamed the Scott Newspaper Syndicate in 1933. He intended for his syndication of small, black newspapers, to reduce the overhead cost of publication; in return, the papers would add stories from the Atlanta World to their issues. Initial publication costs were $13 for 200 copies of a standard small newspaper.

== Acquisitions and syndication ==
At its height, the Scott Newspaper Syndicate employed around 50 full-time workers and 500 part-time workers to prepare newspapers for publication, including journalists Frank Marshall Davis, Robert E. Johnson, and Lerone Bennett Jr. During and following World War II, many African Americans left the Southern United States for the American Southwest and Midwest (a period known as the Second Great Migration); the syndication began publishing in locations like Phoenix, Arizona, and Michigan. Members of the syndication largely did not participate in the Double V campaign – the agitation for democracy domestically (for African Americans) and internationally (to oppose leaders like Adolf Hitler) – because it was started by newspapers outside of the chain, such as the Pittsburgh Courier. While its newspapers denounced discrimination within the military, their objections were careful and did not promote disobedience.

Other black newspapers in the early 20th century also created syndicates, including the Chicago Defender, the Pittsburgh Courier, and the Baltimore Afro-American.

=== List of partnered papers ===
Over 240 papers belonged to the syndication at its height. Papers belonging to the syndicate, at least for a time, included the following:

- Alabama Tribune
- Bayou State Register
- Birmingham World
- Chattanooga Tribune
- Galveston Examiner
- Indianapolis Recorder
- Jackson Advocate
- Jackson Times
- Lighthouse and Informer
- Louisville Independent News
- Memphis World
- Omaha Chronicle
- St. Louis Argus

== Demise and legacy ==
In 1949, the Atlanta World was sued for libel in Georgia, and though the suit was dropped, syndicated newspapers altered their reporting under the confines of a strict Georgian defamation law.

Following the Brown v. Board of Education ruling in 1954, many smaller black newspapers were under financial pressure from white advertisers, but the Atlanta World remained relatively successful. Because of logistical difficulties, the syndicate closed in 1955. At the time of its closure, it operated ten newspapers.

Scholar Thomas Aiello writes that the Scott Newspaper Syndicate was an important precursor to the civil rights movement which "formaliz[ed] news coverage across a region dominated by Jim Crow" and developed "a unity of thought among black southerners".
