= Fleming Alexander =

American businessman and publisher (1888–1980)

The Rev. Fleming Emory Alexander (April 14, 1888 – December 13, 1980) was a noted minister, businessman, and newspaper publisher. Alexander founded and published the Roanoke Tribune in Roanoke, Virginia, which is one of the nation's longest-running black newspapers. He was also a noted anti-segregationist.

== Early life ==
Alexander was born on April 14, 1888, in Christiansburg, Virginia. After the death of his mother, he and his eight siblings were separated and raised by foster parents, the Alexander family. He never knew his parents, and as a child, his surname was "Poor".

He was an ordained Baptist minister and held pastorates in Rustburg, Virginia, Christiansburg, and Buchanan, Virginia. He was the minister of the Schaeffer Baptist Church, now part of the Old Christiansburg Industrial Institute in Christiansburg, Virginia, when he founded the Roanoke Tribune. Alexander learned the printing trade in Kentucky and worked for newspapers throughout the Southern United States. Before moving to Roanoke, he worked with the Atlanta Daily World and Louisburg Reporter. He served in France during WWI in the 802nd Pioneer Infantry regiment, then returned to Lynchburg where he operated a private printing business and taught printing at the Virginia Theological Seminary.

Fleming Alexander came to Roanoke, Virginia, in 1939, and at the height of the Great Depression, founded the Roanoke Tribune. The Tribune was Western Virginia's only African-American-owned newspaper and focused on the black community. He had gained experience as a printer and journalist before coming to Roanoke.

== Roanoke Tribune ==
Fleming E. Alexander founded the Roanoke Tribune newspaper in 1939 at 5 Gilmer Avenue, later moved to 312 Henry Street, then to Melrose Avenue in Roanoke. As an African-American newspaper, it brought attention against the Jim Crow laws of Roanoke and Western Virginia. It championed black representation on Roanoke's public boards and better schools for black children in the segregated southern states. The Tribune was published weekly on Saturdays, including local interest columns and statewide, national, and international news.

The Tribune took an early stand against segregation. Indeed, the motto on the masthead proclaimed: "Only Negro newspaper published in South Western Virginia." The newspaper has a printed purpose: "1) to promote self-esteem; 2) to encourage RESPECT for self and differences in others, and 3) to help create lasting vehicles through which diverse peoples can unite on some common basis."

Later, because of poor health after a car accident in 1971, he sold the Roanoke Tribune to his daughter, Claudia Alexander Whitworth. The Roanoke Tribune celebrated its 75th anniversary on April 9, 2014. A recent video history of the newspaper is available.

== Desegregation ==
Fleming Alexander was an early advocate of desegregation in Virginia's schools. Alexander was adamant about desegregating Virginia's schools after the Brown v. Topeka Board of Education decision. He was one of five black leaders in Virginia to meet with Governor Thomas B. Stanley to discuss the impact of the Brown decision on Virginia, and Stanley's intention of keeping the schools separate.

Early on, the newspaper fought against the massive resistance program to block Virginia's schools racial integration, which was supported by the powerful Byrd Organization in state politics.

However, he was also an opponent of rapid integration, which caused conflicts with other black leaders in Roanoke. A defamation suit against ten ministers was settled out of court.

He died on December 13, 1980, in New York City.
