= Mahlon Van Horne =

American minister, state legislator, and diplomat (1840–1910)

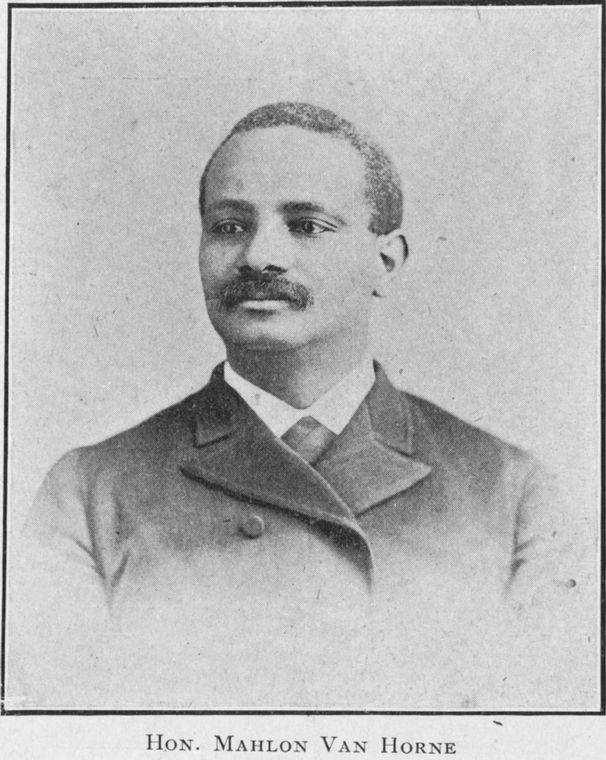
- Van Horne in 1901

Member of the Rhode Island House of Representatives
- In office 1885–1889

United States Consul to Saint Thomas, Danish West Indies
- In office December 1896 – July 1903

Personal details
- Born: March 5, 1840 Princeton, New Jersey, US
- Died: May 25, 1910 (aged 70) Antigua
- Party: Republican
- Education: Lincoln University (Pennsylvania)
- Occupation: Minister, politician, diplomat

Mahlon Van Horne (March 5, 1840 – May 25, 1910) was an American minister, state legislator, and diplomat from Rhode Island. He served as pastor of the Union Colored Congregational Church in Newport, Rhode Island from 1869 to 1898. He served three terms in the Rhode Island General Assembly from 1885 to 1889, becoming the first African American to serve in the state legislature. In 1896, President William McKinley appointed him U.S. Consul to the Danish West Indies at Saint Thomas, where he served until 1903.

== Early life and education ==
Van Horne was born on March 5, 1840, in Princeton, New Jersey, to Mathias and Diana (Oakham) Van Horne. He studied classical languages, education, and theology at Pennsylvania's Ashmun Collegiate Institute for Colored Youth (renamed Lincoln University in 1866). In 1868 he became one of the first six students to receive a bachelor's degree from Lincoln University, where he embarked on graduate studies in 1871. Ordained to the ministry in 1866, Van Horne taught school briefly in Huntington, New York. In 1867, he became principal of the African Methodist Episcopal Zion School, a school for Black students in Charleston, South Carolina, where he lived for one year before moving back to the North.

== Religious career ==
In 1869, Van Horne became pastor of Union Congregational Church in Newport, Rhode Island. The church was organized in 1824 as an offshoot of the Free African Union Society formed in 1780 to foster free Black people's religious, educational, and civic life in the state. Predominantly Black, it was one of the few racially integrated congregations in the U.S. at the time. Van Horne served as pastor for 28 years, overseeing the church's move to a new building on 49 Division Street (now a private residence) in 1871 after the old church burned down. The congregation grew to 223 members during his pastorate, and he was named Newport's most popular minister in 1891. In addition, he became active in Rhode Island's small Black community, including the Price Hall Masons and Black mutual aid societies, as well as the Republican Party.

== Political career ==
Backed by Black civil rights activist and restaurateur George T. Downing, Van Horne ran for the Newport School Committee in 1871 and won his election. He began serving on the school board in 1872 and held the office for nearly 20 years. Downing and Van Horne collaborated to help integrate the state's public schools in the aftermath of the American Civil War. Both men campaigned tirelessly for civil rights throughout their lives.

In 1885, Van Horne won election to the Rhode Island General Assembly as a Republican, becoming Rhode Island's first African American state legislator. He and Downing championed passage of Rhode Island's Civil Rights Act of 1885, which mandated equal access to public transit, lodging, and dining for all persons regardless of race or previous condition of servitude. Van Horne won re-election in 1887 and 1889, serving three two-year terms.

== Diplomatic career ==
In December 1896, President William McKinley appointed Van Horne to serve as U.S. consul to the island of Saint Thomas in the Danish West Indies (now the United States Virgin Islands). As consul, Van Horne proved popular with residents and lobbied for the U.S. purchase of Saint Thomas from Denmark, which happened in 1917. Accused of meddling in local politics and of financial irregularities at the consulate, Van Horne faced charges of incompetence and neglect of duties, impeached, and removed from office on July 31, 1903. Seventy prominent West Indian merchants and officials petitioned for his reappointment, but President Theodore Roosevelt upheld the impeachment. Christopher Payne succeeded Van Horne as U.S. consul.

== Death and legacy ==
Van Horne wed Rachel Ann Huston of Princeton in 1862. The couple had four children: daughters Florence V. (Miller) and Louisa S. A., and sons Mahlon H. and Mathias Alonzo Van Horne. Mathias Van Horne studied at Howard University and became Rhode Island's first Black dentist. Rachel died in 1907.

Van Horne died of heart failure on May 25, 1910, at the age of 70 while serving as a missionary in Antigua. In its obituary, the Newport Mercury (June 25, 1910) praised him as being "in every way one of the leading citizens of Newport" and "one of the leading colored citizens of the state."

Van Horne was inducted into the Rhode Island Heritage Hall of Fame in 2005.
