= The Reflector (Virginia newspaper) =

Weekly newspaper in Virginia, US

The Reflector was a weekly newspaper in Charlottesville, Virginia, that ran from 1933 to at least 1935. Edited by T. J. Sellers, it called itself "Charlottesville's Only Negro Weekly." It included articles on local and national news, social columns, and editorials and articles on topics of particular interest to black readers such as racial identity, lynching, and famous African Americans. The publication captured aspects of life under Jim Crow laws in this small city, including a regular feature on events at segregated Jefferson High School. In 2003, a new Charlottesville newspaper began publication as The African American Reflector, in honor of the original newspaper's editor.

In a 1934 issue, the editors noted that along with its Black readership, 200 white Charlottesville residents also were "regular subscribers" to the paper.
