= Colored Citizen (Cincinnati) =

African American newspaper in Ohio, US

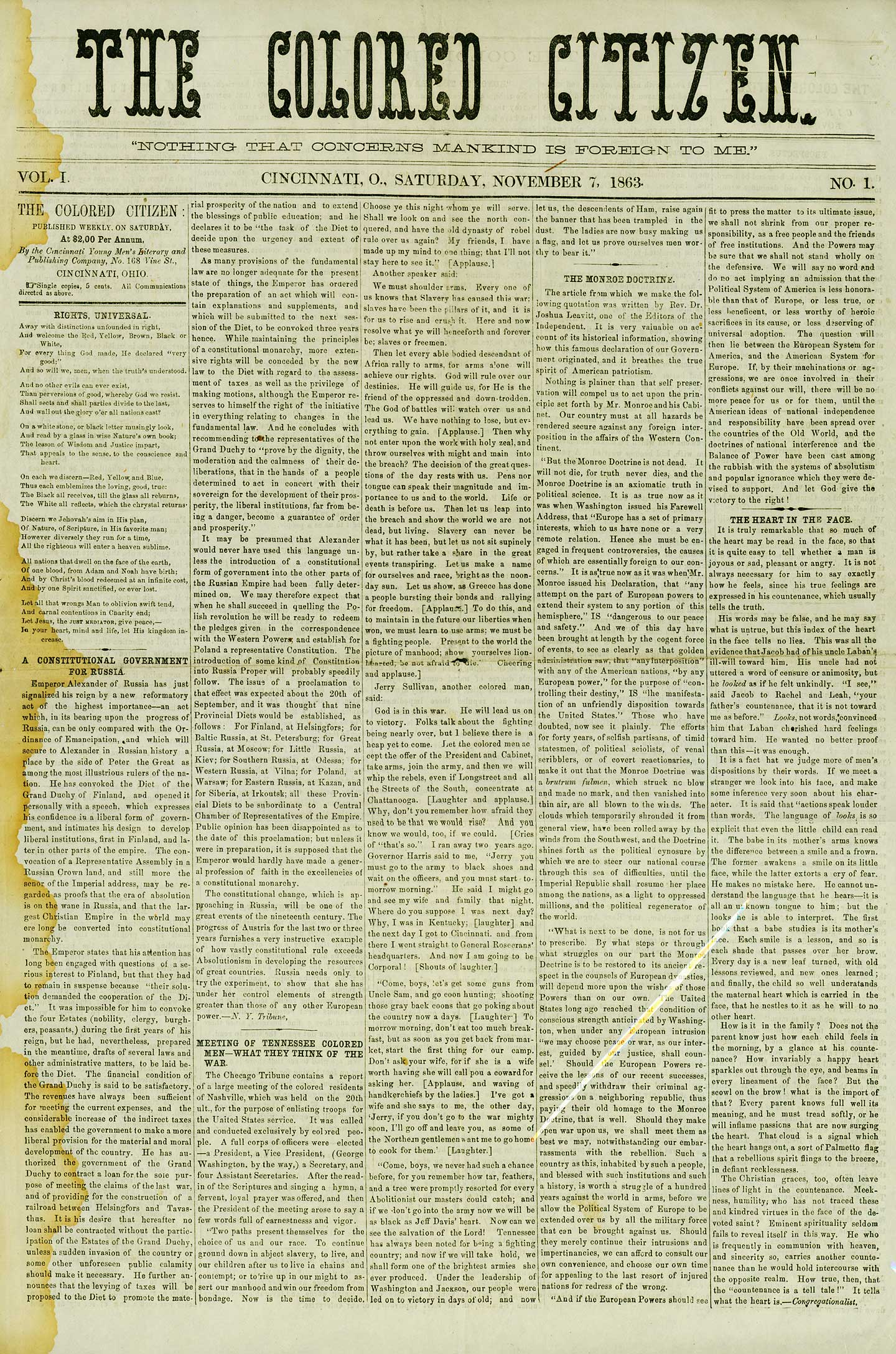
Front page of November 7, 1863, issue of the Colored Citizen – one of two known surviving issues

The Colored Citizen was an African American newspaper founded in Cincinnati, Ohio, in 1863. It was one of several black newspapers founded in Cincinnati during the nineteenth century, and it was one of only a few black papers in the country published during the American Civil War. The precise dates of its dissolution are not known. Only two surviving copies of the newspaper remain.

== Background ==
The African American population of Cincinnati was one of the largest in Ohio preceding the American Civil War. There were several African American newspapers published in the city around this time, and ultimately around a dozen were published by 1900. Two members of the city's black community were William H. Yancy (a barber) and Thomas Woodson (a reverend), both of whom were active in the establishment of black periodicals in the state, including the Palladium of Liberty and the Disfranchised American.

== History ==
In 1863, Yancy, Woodson, and others established the Colored Citizen, a weekly African American newspaper, in Cincinnati. It was one of the only African American newspapers published during the Civil War, and only two surviving copies remain. The available evidence suggests that the paper was focused on the life of African Americans serving during the Civil War and declared itself as the "Soldier's Organ". The paper did not actively disclose its editing teams; the bylines were largely of groups, including the Cincinnati Young Men's Literary and Publishing Company, not individuals. Among those who contributed to the paper were Joseph Carter Corbin (who may have published the paper), Charles W. Bell, Harry F. Leonard, and George Washington Williams – all young writers.

The paper was "utterly opposed" to the social movement that sought to repatriate formerly enslaved people to Africa, and it voiced dissatisfaction with economic contracts being drawn up for enslaved people following the Civil War (which provided wages as opposed to land).

After experiencing financial difficulties, the paper closed in 1873, though one scholar writes that it closed in 1869. Whether it ever reopened is not clear; the local black community believed that the paper never reopened after its 1873 closure, but some scholars say that the paper was reopened by Leonard and Bell in 1887.
