= Earl E. Thorpe =

Professor, author and clergy

Earlie Endris Thorpe (November 9, 1924 – January 30, 1989) was a professor of history, an author, and clergyman in the United States. He lived in Durham, North Carolina and was a professor at North Carolina Central University for 27 years. Duke University has a collection of his papers and correspondence.

Thorpe served in Italy during World War II. He earned bachelor's and master's degrees in history from North Carolina College for Negroes. He earned a Ph.D. in History from Ohio State University in 1953.

He and his wife, Martha Vivian Branch, had two daughters: Rita Harrington and Gloria Earl.

== Legacy ==
Marcus P. Nevius delivered the 30th Annual Earlie E. Thorpe Memorial Lecture at North Carolina Central University in 2020.

== Writings ==
- "Negro Historiography in the United States", dissertation
- Negro Historians in the United States (1958)
- The Desertion of Man: A Critique of Philosophy of History (1958)
- The Mind of the Negro: An Intellectual History of Afro-Americans (1961)
- Eros and Freedom in Southern Life and Thought (1967)
- The Central Theme of Black History (1969)
- "The Black Experience in America" editor, ten-booklet series
- Struggle for a nation's conscience : the civil rights movement
- Pioneers and Planters; Black Beginnings in America with Joseph Penn, American Education Publications (1971)
- The Old South: A Psychohistory (1972)
- "Black history and the organic perspective : an essay to introduce the directory and bibliography no. 870-872" (1975)
- "The uses of Black history : a speech delivered during the observance of Black History Week", February 11, 1980
- African Americans and the Sacred: Spirituals, Slave Religion, and Symbolism (1982)
- Slave Religion, Spirituals, and C. J. Jung (1983)
- A Concise History of North Carolina Central University (1984)
