= West Virginia Enterprise =

West Virginia newspaper

The West Virginia Enterprise was an African American newspaper in West Virginia. It was founded around 1885 by Christopher Payne and J.B. Cabell; it is not known when it went defunct. Payne went on two publish two other newspapers.

== History ==
The West Virginia Enterprise was founded by Christopher Payne and J.B. Cabell, circa 1885. It was published in Charleston, West Virginia, and was released weekly. Payne published three newspapers, and the West Virginia Enterprise was his first.

Similar to an earlier black newspaper in West Virginia, the Pioneer Press, the paper focused on feature stories, including one issue about asylums for the insane. Payne was a community leader for African Americans in West Virginia, and he took advertising space for an exhibit at that year's state fair. The paper was financially supported by its subscribers and by advertisers. Fees for subscribers were $1 per year (or $0.76 per half-year), and its advertisers included pseudoscientific medical products for healing and curing ailments. It is not known when the paper became defunct.

Years after his 1925 death, the Negro History Bulletin in 1942 said the paper (like his others) "championed the cause of the Negro, and urged support of the Republican party as the best way to advance the interests of the race". A similar description was written by historian Wilhelmena S. Robinson in a 1969 encyclopedia, and in a 1972 newspaper article.
