= Sarah Patton Boyle =

American civil rights activist (1906–1994)

- by Holsinger Studio, from the Richmond Times-Dispatch
- Born: Sarah-Lindsay Patton; May 9, 1906 near Charlottesville, Virginia
- Died: February 20, 1994 (aged 87); Arlington, Virginia
- Occupations: Civil rights activist, writer
- Years active: 1950–1967
- Notable work: The Desegregated Heart: A Virginian's Stand in Time of Transition (1962)
- Spouse: E. Roger Boyle

Sarah-Lindsay Patton "Pattie" Boyle (May 9, 1906 – February 20, 1994) was an American author and civil rights activist from Virginia during the Civil Rights Movement. She is the author of The Desegregated Heart and various articles and books about race relations in Virginia and the South. Boyle was a "faculty wife" of drama professor, E. Roger Boyle, at the University of Virginia. Boyle was the first white person to serve on the board of directors for the Charlottesville NAACP chapter. She was "an outspoken advocate for desegregation in her native South."

== Biography ==
Boyle was born near Charlottesville, Virginia, on an Albemarle County plantation which dated back to the Colonial era. Her father was an Episcopalian clergyman who was the director of the American Church Institute of the Protestant Episcopal Church. Boyle was a cousin to General George S. Patton. Her grandparents were veterans of the Civil War and had fought for the Confederate States. As a young person, her family followed a "Southern Code" in which her family expected her to only have "formal relations with blacks." Boyle grew up with black servants, who she was allowed to be friends with until she turned twelve and was inducted into the "Southern Code." She also grew up with stories about her family, which also included the Revolutionary War general, Hugh Mercer, and the "great legal mind," John Mercer Patton. Her father also worked to instill a sense of Christian morality and encouraged Boyle to right the wrongs she saw in the world. Boyle was home-schooled because of dyslexia and didn't learn to read until she was in her teens. As a young adult, she went to the Corcoran School of Art.

In 1932, she married drama and speech professor, E. Roger Boyle. They had two sons together; E. Roger Boyle, III was born in 1939 and Patton Lindsay Boyle was born in 1943. Also in the 1940s, she and her husband began to see that they were incompatible as a married couple and were later divorced in 1965. Until her sons were in their late teens, she was housewife, but around 1950, she began to write magazine articles.

At the university, she had become friends with a black woman who was able to pass as white. She also began to question her prejudices after hearing her father give a speech at Howard University.

Boyle became involved loosely with Gregory Swanson, who was admitted to the University of Virginia law school in 1950 after a lawsuit was filed since he'd previously been denied entry due to his race. Swanson's case affected Boyle strongly because she had wrongly "assumed that blacks did not associate with whites because blacks preferred it that way." The Swanson case showed her that not all blacks desired segregation and Boyle began to feel that segregation was truly wrong. She wrote to him to welcome him to the university, thinking that she was one of many white people who agreed that segregation was wrong. Through her involvement with Swanson she eventually met T. J. Sellers, the editor of the black newspaper in Charlottesville, The Tribune. During this time, she became one of a few white supporters of desegregation in Virginia, writing hundreds of articles and speeches imploring immediate integration. Her fight for desegregation was praised by name in Martin Luther King Jr.'s 1963 "Letter from Birmingham Jail."

Boyle died in Arlington, Virginia inside her home due to complications from Alzheimer's disease. She was buried near where she was born.

== Civil rights activism ==
Boyle's first letter was to the Richmond Times-Dispatch, called a "Plea for Tolerance." Boyle believed that whites and blacks alike would reply in kind, but instead she found silence from the community at large, which she interpreted as fear to speak out. In 1951, Reader's Digest offered her a chance to write about Swanson and his case, however, after showing her essay to Swanson himself, he "denounced her words without explanation and walked away," and Boyle never published her work. Swanson said that "While her heart may be in the right place, she possesses strains of paternalism which I utterly deplore." After consulting other black ministers and editors, she found similar responses, which T. J. Sellers pointed out that she was paternalistic and condescending in tone. Later, Boyle would look back at her writing and how she felt, and realize that she was "motivated largely by class pretensions and a self-styled 'maternalism' that she later repudiated." Boyle wanted to unlearn her racial prejudices and Sellers became her teacher and close friend. Their conversations were humorously referred to by one another as the "T. J. Sellers Course for Backward Southern Whites."

Boyle became an outspoken advocate for immediate integration through her conversations with Sellers. She began to write regularly for Sellers's paper in a weekly column called "From Behind the Curtain." Her works were considered to be about "the development and maintenance of good human relations between all people." Boyle became part of the public attention in 1954 when she spoke at the Virginia General Assembly's Commission on Public Education where she advocated school integration.

On August 29, 1956, the Ku Klux Klan burned a cross in her front yard, most likely in response to her article "Southerners Will Like Integration" for the Saturday Evening Post. Instead of being afraid, Boyle was reported to laugh and called for her teen son to take a picture of the cross. The purpose of her article for the Post was to convince white Southerners that integration could be done amicably, however the way the article was received by white readers called to mind the idea of "interracial sex" because of the title and the picture of Boyle walking with two black male medical students. Boyle received hate mail and threatening phone calls in addition to the burning cross. She was also "subjected to repeated snubs and slights" and while her friends agreed with her in private, "none sided with her in public."

Boyle was part of the 1963 March on Washington for Jobs and Freedom.

She was arrested at a 1964 Monson Motor Lodge protests in St. Augustine, Florida. She and 11 other activists were arrested while they performed a sit-in at the restaurant at the motor lodge.

Boyle retired from her activism in 1967. She found that her personal convictions clashed with the "realpolitik of the late 1960s." However, she continued to write and explored the topic of age discrimination during her retirement.

== Legacy ==
Boyle was honored by the City of Charlottesville for her work in civil rights on May 8, 2001. Her name also appears on a bronze plaque on the Drewary Brown Bridge recognizing her as "bridge builder." Boyle's papers are located at the University of Virginia Library in the Albert and Shirley Small Special Collections Library. A marker on the ACCORD Freedom Trail in St. Augustine, Florida notes her arrest at the Monson Motor Lodge in 1964; an event she was proud of.
