= T. J. Sellers =

African American journalist, newspaper editor, and newspaper publisher

Thomas Jerome Sellers (1911 - 2006), was an African American journalist, newspaper editor, newspaper publisher, and educator from Charlottesville, Virginia.

== Life ==
Sellers was born in 1911 and grew up in Charlottesville and nearby Esmont, Virginia. For a time he attended Esmont High School and in 1930, was a member of the first class of African American students to graduate from an accredited high school in the Charlottesville area, the Jefferson School. Remembering his school experience in a 1977 editorial in The New York Times, Sellers described the racist environment in which the small, all-female faculty of Jefferson High School taught him. Sellers' wife, Eleanor, later became an English teacher at Jefferson High School. The couple were prominent members of Charlottesville's African American community until they moved north in the early 1950s. They had a daughter, Thomasine, in 1942. In the 1940s, Sellers was employed as the Charlottesville superintendent of the Richmond Beneficial Insurance Company.

Sellers was a strong voice for African American representation in both Charlottesville and Commonwealth politics, and advocated tirelessly for black issues through the Jim Crow era. Along with other prominent local African Americans, he was present at the hearing on September 9, 1950, when the University of Virginia was forced to admit its first African American student, Gregory Swanson, to the school of Law. Sellers's influence—and vocal criticism—led budding white civil rights activist Sarah Patton Boyle to seek his advice. Sellers became Boyle's mentor in her quest to support school integration in Charlottesville, and Boyle discusses Sellers's personality, words, and actions in depth in her memoir, The Desegregated Heart.

In 1953, the Sellers family moved to New York. In New York, he attended New York University where he received his B.A in the early 1950s. He also entered NYU's graduate program in Supervision and Administration. In the 1960s he taught at P.S.175, where the curriculum included African American history, which was not common at the time. He continued teaching into the 1970s and then worked in education administration in the northeast Bronx, serving as a special assistant to a Community School District Superintendent and Director of Education Information Services and Public Relations. In 1974, he was the speaker for the Charlottesville branch of the N.A.A.C.P.'s presentation on "U.S. Supreme Court School Desegregation Decision - Twenty Years After". He was a member of the Education Writers Association and the National School Public Relations Association.

== Newspaper career ==
Sellers began his newspaper career early, as editor of the Esmont High School Journal. His first professional newspaper, The Reflector, began publication in Charlottesville in 1933, and was advertised as "Charlottesville's Only Negro Weekly." Articles and editorials, mostly composed by Sellers, covered a range of topics, including local politics, African American rights, news including reports on local lynchings, some national news, and local African American society news. No issues from The Reflector dated later than 1935 appear to have survived. As a freshman at Virginia Union University in 1935, Sellers started a magazine, The Dawn, while also serving on the staff of the Union publication The Panther. With students from several other schools, he was a founder of the Colored Collegiate Press Association in 1937. He served as a member of the editorial staff and wrote intermittently for the Norfolk New Journal and Guide, which published his writing from the 1940s to the 1970s. In 1950, Sellers became the editor of The Charlottesville Tribune, a satellite publication of the Roanoke Tribune. It ran for just a few years. After his move to New York, Sellers worked as managing editor of the Amsterdam News until 1956.

=== Newspaper collections ===
The only known surviving copies of The Reflector and The Charlottesville Tribune are housed at the Albert and Shirley Small Special Collections Library at the University of Virginia, where the first issue of The Dawn may also be found.
