= E. Roger Boyle =

American writer and scholar of drama

E. Roger Boyle (1908-1993) was an American writer and scholar of drama. He taught playwriting at the University of Virginia from 1932 to 1977, where he chaired the drama department from 1960 to 1966. He also founded the Virginia Players and directed 350 plays. Under the pseudonym Robin Grey, Boyle wrote the best selling mystery novel, Puzzle in Porcelain, during the 1940s. Boyle was married to Sarah Patton Boyle, a civil rights activist in Virginia.

Boyle grew up in Saco, Maine and attended the Yale School of Drama.
