= The True Southerner =

African-American newspaper

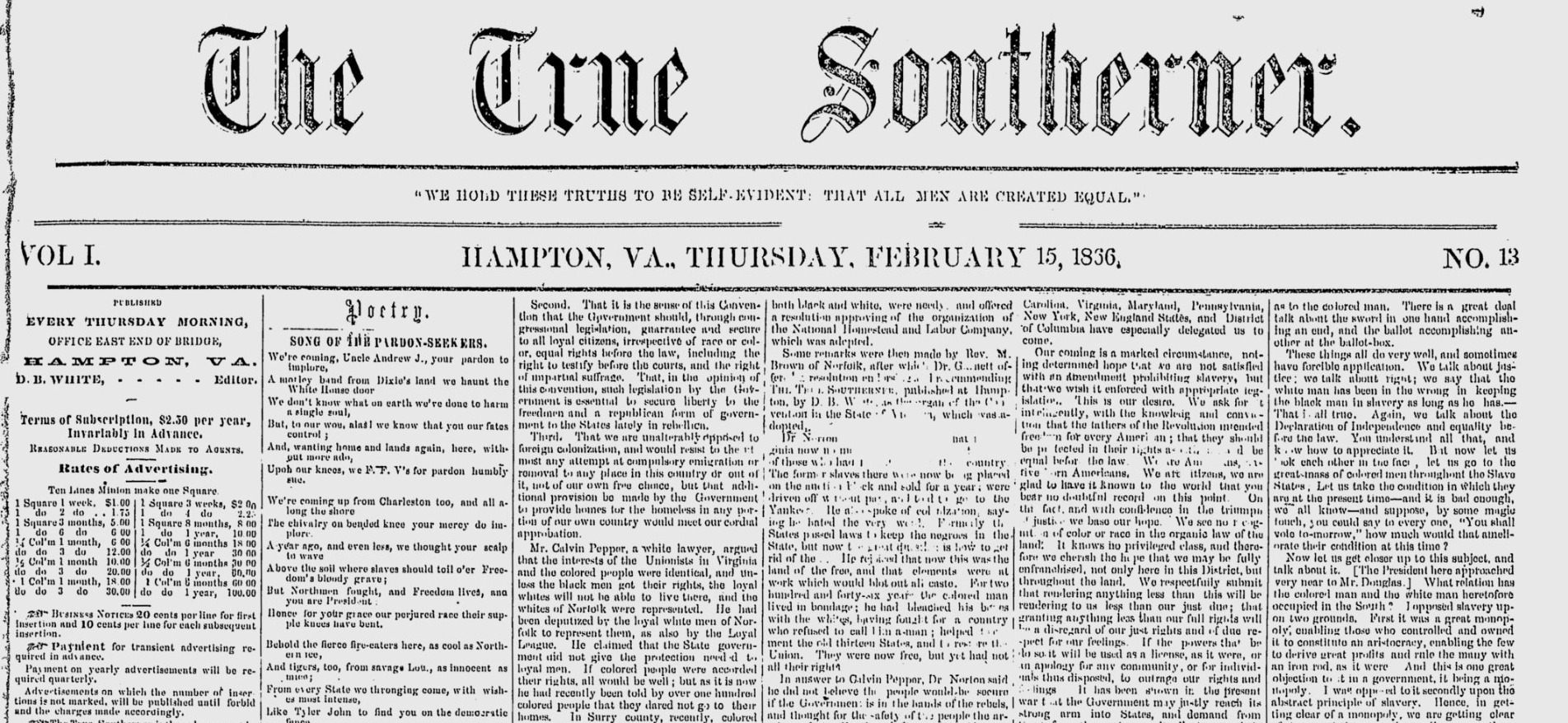
The True Southerner from February 1866.

The True Southerner was a weekly newspaper published during the Reconstruction era after the American Civil War in Hampton, Virginia and then Norfolk, Virginia. It advocated for the rights of African Americans and was the first African-American newspaper published in Virginia. Founded in 1865, the paper was moved to Norfolk early the next year, where Joseph T. Wilson served as its editor. The paper's offices and press were destroyed by a white mob in early 1866, and it ceased publication shortly thereafter.

== History ==
The True Southerner was the first African-American newspaper published in Virginia upon its foundation in March or November 1865, in Hampton, Virginia, by D. B. White. The first issue was published November 24, 1865. Publication continued until mid-April 1866. The paper was not initially financially successful. It was sponsored by the Union League and in Hampton vocally criticized a white mob that seriously injured several Black people. Civil War veteran Joseph T. Wilson became its editor in early 1866, and may have taken over the paper; sources conflict over whether Wilson or White led its move to Norfolk, Virginia, in February 1866, seeking a market where the paper might be more financially successful.

The paper defended Calvin Pepper, a lawyer representing the Loyal League of Virginia. It also published a column by "Anna" titled "To the Freed Women" about the status of women, particularly women of color, and inequalities. As editor, Wilson vocally criticized Andrew Johnson's decision to veto creation of the Freedmen's Bureau and the Civil Rights Act of 1866. He also used the paper to advocate for giving Black men the right to vote. These actions angered some living in Norfolk, and just two months after the move the paper's press was destroyed by a mob. This was just one of many such attacks around the nation during the Reconstruction era.

The Library of Virginia has issues of the paper on microfilm and online.
