= The Circuit (newspaper) =

African American newspaper published in Virginia

- Type: Monthly
- Founders: Thomas Chapman Tyler; William H. Lewis, Sr.
- Publisher: Negro Journal Association of Northern Virginia
- President: W. H. Lewis
- Editor: Joseph C. Hackett
- Associate editor: J. H. Anderson
- Founded: 1937
- Ceased publication: 1954
- Language: English
- Headquarters: Catlett, Virginia
- Circulation: 1,200
- OCLC number: 40901521

The Circuit was an African American newspaper published in Catlett, Virginia, from 1937 until 1954. It was described as "Virginia's only colored paper north of Richmond." The Circuit was important to the African American communities in northern Virginia during the Jim Crow era.

As of November 2013, only ten issues are known to still exist in archives, five at the Library of Virginia and six at the archives of the Afro-American Historical Association of Fauquier County (AAHAFC) in The Plains, Virginia. Information published in those available copies was important in documenting the historic nature of some African-American communities such as the Ashville Historic District.

Surviving issues
Date	Held by
1940 Feb	Library of Virginia
1940 Mar	Library of Virginia
1942 Dec	Library of Virginia
1943 May	AAHAFC
1945 May	Library of Virginia
1945 Aug	AAHAFC
1946 Jun	Library of Virginia; AAHAFC
1952 Jun	AAHAFC
1952 Nov	AAHAFC
1953 Jan	AAHAFC
