= Christopher Payne =

American politician (1845–1925)

Christopher H. Payne
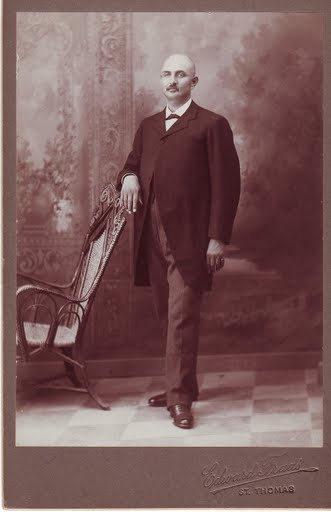

Member of the West Virginia House of Delegates
- In office January, 1897 – January, 1901

Personal details
- Born: September 7, 1845 Monroe County, West Virginia, U.S.
- Died: December 5, 1925 (aged 80) U.S. Virgin Islands
- Party: Republican
- Occupation: minister, journalist, politician

Religious life
- Religion: Baptist

Christopher Harrison Payne (September 7, 1845 – December 5, 1925) was an African American religious, educational, and political leader of the late nineteenth and early twentieth centuries. Born in the American South during the time of slavery, Payne rose to a level of prominence achieved by few, regardless of race. His many accomplishments include being the first African American elected to the West Virginia Legislature. He served as U.S. consul to St. Thomas from 1903 to 1917.

== Early life ==
Payne was born in Red Sulphur Springs in Monroe County, Virginia (now West Virginia), on September 7, 1845 to Thomas Payne and Barsheba Ellison, both of whom were by then free from slavery. Thomas Payne, a cattle drover, died of smallpox when his only child, Christopher, was two years old. Christopher's mother, Barsheba, was taught to read and write by her father, the slave owner James Ellison, and her enslaved mother Fanny who was freed upon the death of Ellison's wife according to his will. Christopher's mother, in turn, taught him to read and write at a very early age. Education would remain a guiding tenet of the Payne family.

During the American Civil War, Payne was forced to serve as an orderly in the Confederate Army. He was able to return home in 1864 and begin formal education for the first time after the war by attending night school while working as a farmhand during the day. He received a teaching certificate in 1868, becoming one of the first African American teachers in Summers County, West Virginia. He continued to teach and farm until he was baptized in 1875. He was licensed to preach in February 1876 and was ordained as a Baptist minister in May 1877.

== Religious leader ==
Following his ordination in 1877, Payne founded Second Baptist Church in Hinton, West Virginia. He pastored many other churches and was said to have delivered over 1,500 sermons and converted 500 people. After ministering for six years, Payne graduated from the Richmond Theological Institute in 1883 as well as State University, now the Virginia Union University. Payne's involvement in his religious community continued as he presided over the West Virginia Baptist State Convention for 16 years, and, on several occasions, he spoke at the national assemblies of white Baptists.

== Newspaper publisher ==
Payne established three newspapers in West Virginia: West Virginia Enterprise, The Pioneer, and Mountain Eagle. When founded, the West Virginia Enterprise was the only Black newspaper in West Virginia. Payne was also a correspondent for other journals, including those geared toward the white community. Payne used these venues to pursue equality between the races as well as to encourage Black people to improve their circumstances through education and the purchase of their land and homes.

== Attorney ==
Payne studied law and was admitted to the West Virginia Bar in 1889, becoming one of the first Black lawyers in West Virginia.

== Politician ==
Payne's growing stature within both the Black and white communities led to his appointment as an alternate delegate to the 1884 Republican National Convention, later serving as a regular delegate to the 1888 Republican National Convention where Benjamin Harrison was nominated for President of the United States. State leaders pushed for Payne's appointment as Ambassador to Liberia. Instead, he was appointed Deputy Collector for the United States Internal Revenue Service in Charleston, West Virginia. Along with Byrd Prillerman, another prominent African American educator, Payne was able to persuade the West Virginia Legislature to establish the West Virginia Colored Institute, now West Virginia State University, in 1891.

In 1896, Payne was elected to the West Virginia legislature, becoming the first African American to serve in that elective body. When the Spanish–American War of 1898 followed, Payne raised a volunteer Black regiment and saw to their arrival at the war time encampment of Camp Atkinson.

== Ambassador ==
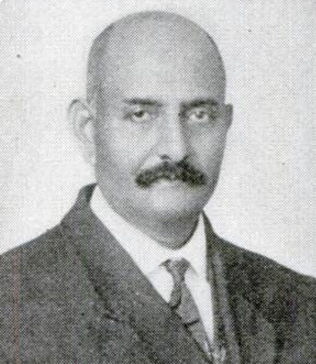
Hon C H Payne

Due to his faithful service to the Republican Party, in 1903 United States President Theodore Roosevelt named Payne as Consul General to the Danish West Indies, a rare appointment for an African American at that time. Payne replaced as consul another African American politician, Mahlon Van Horne, who had been impeached and removed from office for alleged interference in local politics and financial regularities at his consulate.

== NAACP ==
Payne worked with the NAACP, serving on the planning committee for the 1917 Negro Silent Protest Parade.

== Family life ==
Payne married Ann Delilah Hargo at a young age and they had eight children. His youngest son and namesake, Christopher Hansen Payne (1881–1914), graduated from Howard University and received a medical degree. He practiced medicine in Hinton, West Virginia until his early death in 1914.

Children of Christopher Payne and Ann Delilah Hargo:

- Arabella Geneva Payne, 1860–1930
- Lewis W. Payne, 1862–1927
- Martha Adelaide Payne, 1866–1944
- Mary Jane Payne, 1869–1932
- James Robert Payne, 1872–1943
- Charles Henry Payne, 1874–1950
- Cyrus Alexander Payne, 1877–1944
- Christopher Hansen Payne, 1881–1914

== Later life ==
Payne remained in the Danish West Indies after they were sold to the United States in 1917 and became the United States Virgin Islands. With the closing of the consulate, he then became prosecuting attorney and police judge in St. Thomas, capital of the Virgin Islands. He died in the Virgin Islands on December 5, 1925, at the age of eighty.

== See also ==
- List of first African-American U.S. state legislators
- African American officeholders from the end of the Civil War until before 1900
