= Memphis World =

Memphis World was an African-American newspaper founded in Memphis, Tennessee, in 1931. It was edited by Lewis O. Swingler, and published by W. A. Scott and L. F. Scott. Educator and activist Estes Kefauver had a column in the paper. The World closed in 1973.

The paper advocated for civil rights.

Its circulation climbed to over 16,000 small in comparison to the combined 220,000 copies sold by Memphis’s two major white dailies in 1942. During World War II, the paper contrasted African Americans’ rising roles in the armed forces with their stalled progress on the home front. By 1963, The Memphis World's circulation had dropped to 6,000, its publication frequency reduced from twice to once weekly, and unable to retain its increasingly Democratic Black readership it ceased publication in 1973.

Articles would talk about civil rights and segreation politics and leadership, education and whats going on in colleges, sports, local news and events and sad moments.

The Memphis World was a prominent African American newspaper providing a platform for Black voices during the Civil Rights Movement. The paper’s coverage of school desegregation and voter rights activism highlights the grassroots efforts to challenge Jim Crow laws. This issue reflects the tensions and hopes of 1955
