= Charlottesville-Albemarle Tribune =

American newspaper

Coordinates: 38.060°N 78.523°W

- Type: Weekly newspaper
- Founder: Randolph Lewis White
- Launched: 1954
- Ceased publication: 2011
- Headquarters: 1055 Grady Ave.
- City: Charlottesville
- Country: United States
- Circulation: 3,066 (as of 1966)
- OCLC number: 27008933

The Charlottesville-Albemarle Tribune was a weekly newspaper in Charlottesville, Virginia published by and for African-American residents of the city.

While the title suggests that the paper covered Charlottesville and Albemarle County, the paper covered news from surrounding counties of Greene, Culpeper, Orange, and Nelson counties as well.

Founded in 1954 by Randolph Lewis White, it bore the name Charlottesville-Albemarle Tribune through 1992, a year after White's death. At that time, the name changed to The Tribune, and this paper ran until 2011.

Sherman White co-published the newspaper with Randolph White for many years. Randolph L. White was the editor, Mrs. Donna Reaves was the society editor, and Sherman R. White was the advertising representative as well as the author of a column called, "Spotlight on Sports". Both men were heavily involved in desegregation efforts in Charlottesville, and the paper contributed important reporting and editorials to the debates in Charlottesville over School integration and Massive resistance.

The newspaper included national columnists such as Vernon E. Jordan, Jr., Wiley Harris, and Bayard Rustin, as well as a column from Virginia House Delegate Thomas J. Michie, Jr. For many years, the newspaper included local society columns covering various regions in the area, including Proffit, Howardsville, Nelson County, Orange County, Radiant, Cumberland, Keene, Cismont, Shenandoah Valley, Yancey Mills, Louisa County, and Charlottesville.

In Charlottesville society news, the newspaper would cover such information as meetings of The Phyllis Wheatley Club, The B Square Club, the Bethune Art and Literary Club, The Lucky Twenty Club, the Taylor Art Club, and the Mt. Zion Social Club. In editions after holidays, the paper would also cover when households traveled to visit far-flung relatives, or when out-of town visitors came to visit a church or parishioner homes.

In 1974, the paper also included a society editor, Mrs. Donna Reaves, and advertising representative Sherman R. White. In December of this year, the subscription rate was $5.00 per year or $3.00 per six months.
