= Roanoke Tribune =

Weekly newspaper in Roanoke, Virginia

Coordinates: 37.286°N 79.975°W

The Roanoke Tribune
- Type: Weekly newspaper
- Founder: Fleming E. Alexander.
- Founded: 1939; 86 years ago
- Language: American English
- Headquarters: 2318 Melrose Avenue Northwest
- City: Roanoke, Virginia
- Country: United States
- OCLC number: 39072181
- Website: Official website
- Free online archives: Chronicling America

The Roanoke Tribune is a weekly newspaper in Roanoke, Virginia.

== History ==
Fleming Alexander founded the Roanoke Tribune newspaper in 1939 at 5 Gilmer Avenue, later moved to 312 Henry Street, and then to Melrose Avenue in Roanoke. As an African-American newspaper, it brought attention against the Jim Crow laws of Roanoke and Western Virginia, and championed black representation on Roanoke's public boards and better schools for the black children in the segregated South. Beginning in 1950, the company began a weekly newspaper in Charlottesville, The Charlottesville Tribune, edited by T. J. Sellers, which ran for only a couple of years.

The Tribune took an early stand against segregation. The motto on the masthead proclaimed: "Only Negro newspaper published in South Western Virginia." The newspaper has a printed purpose: "1) to promote self-esteem; 2) to encourage RESPECT for self and differences in others, and 3) to help create lasting vehicles through which diverse peoples can unite on some common basis."

Later, because of poor health after a car crash in 1971, Fleming Alexander sold the Roanoke Tribune to his daughter, Claudia Alexander Whitworth. The Roanoke Tribune celebrated its 75th anniversary on April 9, 2014.
