= List of African American newspapers in Oregon =

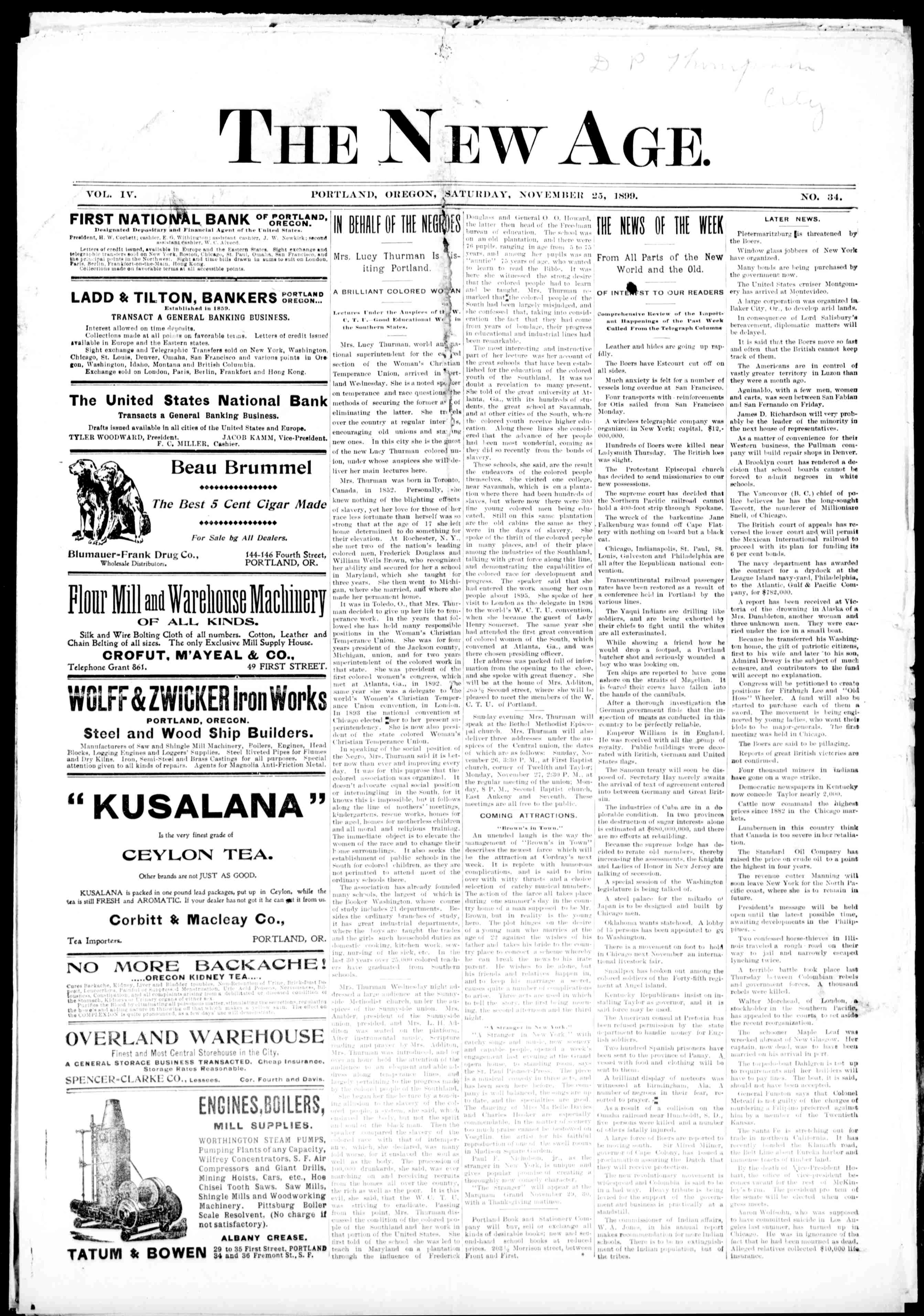
Front page of the November 25, 1899 issue of The New Age.

This is a list of African American newspapers that have been published in the state of Oregon. It includes both current and historical newspapers.

Portland is the only city in Oregon where such newspapers are known to have been published. The first was the Portland New Age, founded as The New Age in 1896. Notable contemporary newspapers include The Observer and The Skanner.

== Newspapers ==
City	Title	Beginning	End	Frequency	Call numbers	Remarks
Portland	The Oregon Advance Times	1968	1968	Weekly	LCCN sn00063638; OCLC 9822566, 30723634	Available online; Suspended publication November 7, 1968.
Portland	The Advocate	1903	1937	Weekly	LCCN sn98062568; OCLC 40119041	Available online; Founded by McCants Stewart and Edward Cannady.; Edited by Edward Cannady from 1923 to June 14, 1930, and by Beatrice Morrow Cannady from June 21, 1930 to 1933.
Portland	The Portland Advocate	1981	1981	Monthly newspaper		Organ of the Black Urban Front: Available online; Published by the National Black United Front.
Portland	Advocate Register	1943	1951	Weekly		Available online; Published by Oliver E. Smith, who upon taking a job with the Bonneville Power Administration in 1951 was required to abandon the paper by the Hatch Act.
Portland	Portland Challenger	1952	1954	Weekly or biweekly	LCCN 2015260134; OCLC 915150593	Available online; Founded by William Hilliard, who also worked for The Oregonian while publishing the Challenger.
Portland	Clarion Defender	1953 or 1965 or 1966	1973?	Weekly	LCCN sn00063577; OCLC 44631946	Available online
Portland	Portland Inquirer	1944	1946	Weekly	LCCN sn00063637; OCLC 45176054	Issues from 1944 available online; Edited by Ralph H. Faulk.
Portland	Oregon Mirror	1959	1962?	Weekly	LCCN 2015260135; OCLC 41109937	Issues from 1962 available online; Published by J. Marcus Wellington, III.; Extant through at least 1962.
Portland	The New Age / Portland New Age (1905–1907)	1896 or 1899	1907	Weekly	LCCN 2009257329, 2014254028, sn83025107, sn83025137; OCLC 9272181, 2806304, 54439332, 876200983, 9272279, 36645096, 876200473	Available online (New Age); Available online (Portland New Age); Published by Adolphus D. Griffin.; Carried local news columns from cities across Washington and Montana, including Walla Walla and Great Falls.
Portland	The Newspaper / Albina Newspaper	1969	?	Biweekly		One issue from 1970 available online.; Served the Albina District.
Portland	Northwest Clarion	1943 or 1944	1961	Weekly	LCCN sn00063575; OCLC 44631939	Available online; Published by Arthur and Etoile Cox.
Portland	Northwest Defender	1962	1965	Weekly	LCCN sn00063576; OCLC 44631941	Available online; Founded by Jimmy "Bang-Bang" Walker.; Published by J.W. Zell II.; Later merged with the Northwest Clarion to become the Clarion Defender.
Portland	Observer	1901?	1903	Weekly		
Portland	The Observer / Portland Observer / People's Observer	1938	1950?	Weekly, later twice-monthly, monthly after 1946	The Observer (1938-1939): LCCN sn00058013, 2009257308; OCLC 43533879, 466878513; The Observer (1945-1950): LCCN sn00062130, 2009257306; OCLC 43515323, 466891144; The People's Observer: LCCN sn00062131, 2009257307; OCLC 43533948, 466893829	Issues from 1938–1939, 1944, and 1945 available online.; Published by William H. McClendon from 1938 to 1939, and revived by him as The People's Observer in 1943.
Portland	The Portland Observer / New Portland Observer	1970	current	Weekly	LCCN sn83025151; OCLC 9360817, 9286929	Official site; Some issues available online
Portland	The Pacific Dispatch	1946	1947		LCCN sn87093419; OCLC 17285562	Published jointly in Seattle and Portland starting September 20, 1946, at which point it was identified as the "Portland edition" of the Pacific Dispatch, which continued until June 27, 1947.; Succeeded by The Seattle Dispatch.
Portland	The Skanner	1975	current	Weekly	ISSN 1543-6357; LCCN sn85042482; OCLC 12566075, 936078	Official site; Some issues available online; Became online-only in 2014.
Portland	The Portland Times	1909 or 1918	1924 or 1923	Weekly		Two issues available online; Founded by William J. McLemore.; Edited by J.A. Merriman, a founder of the Advocate.

== See also ==
- List of African American newspapers and media outlets
- List of African American newspapers in California
- List of African American newspapers in Nevada
- List of African American newspapers in Washington (state)
- List of newspapers in Oregon

== Works cited ==
- Abajian, James De Tarr (1974). Blacks and Their Contributions to the American West: A Bibliography and Union List of Library Holdings Through 1970. G. K. Hall. ISBN 9780816111398.
- Danky, James Philip; Hady, Maureen E., eds. (1998). African-American newspapers and periodicals : a national bibliography. Harvard University Press. ISBN 9780674007888.
- Pride, Armistead Scott; Wilson, Clint C. (1997). A History of the Black Press. Howard University Press. ISBN 9780882581927.
- Smith, Jessie Carney (2012). Black Firsts: 4,000 Ground-Breaking and Pioneering Historical Events. Visible Ink Press. ISBN 9781578593699.
