= List of African American newspapers in Washington (state) =

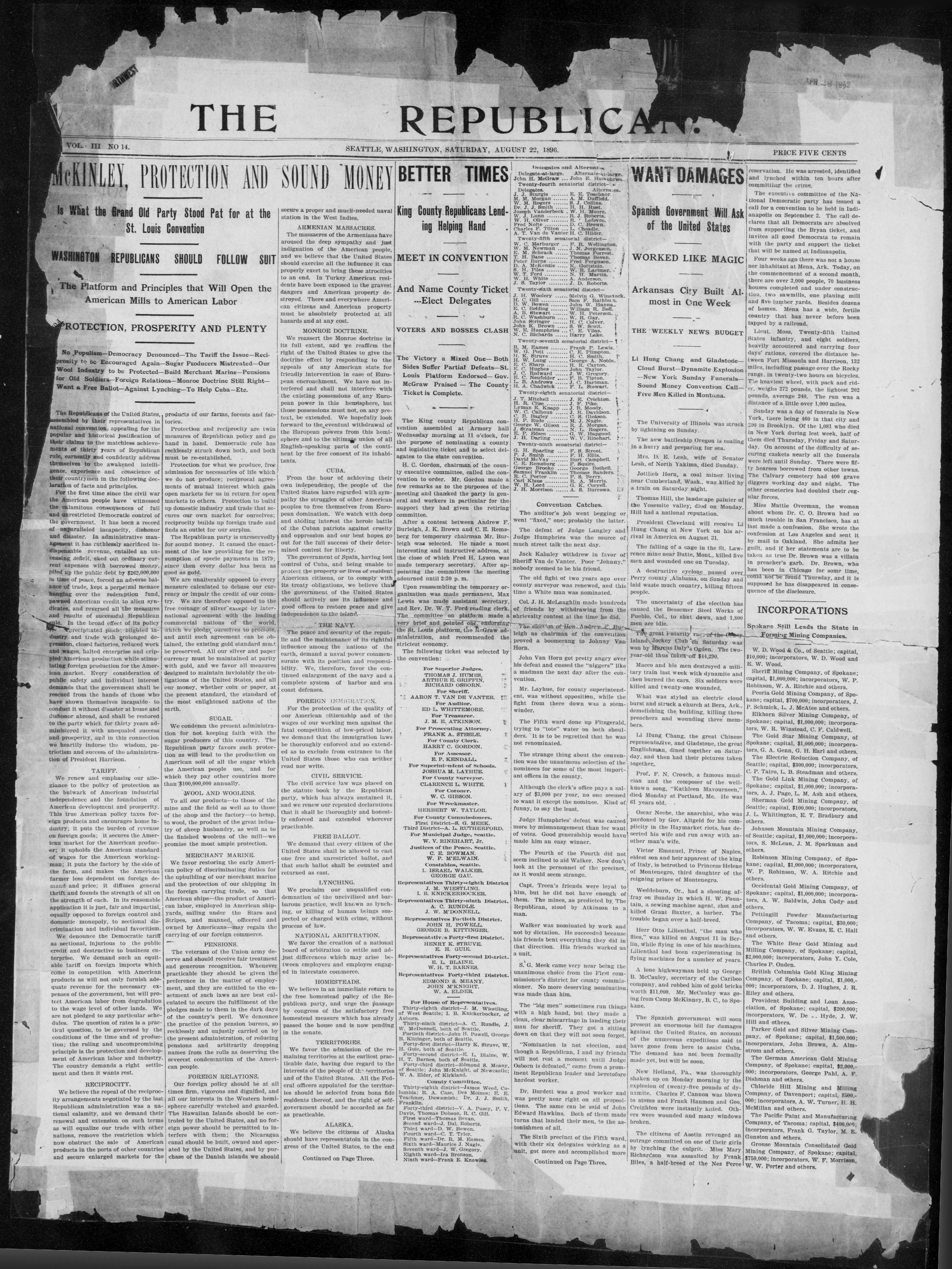
Front page of Horace R. Cayton's The Republican from August 22, 1896.

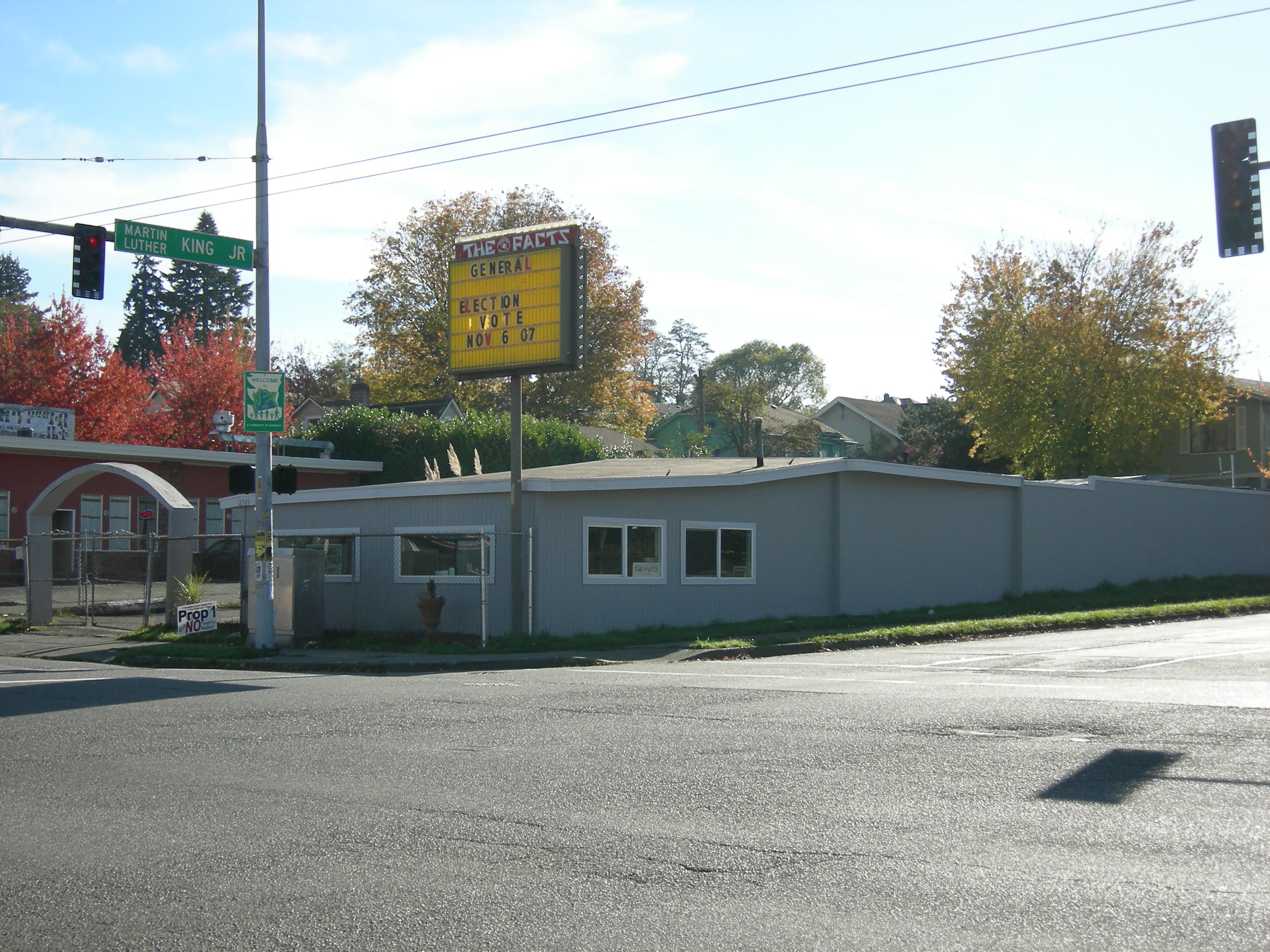
Headquarters of The Facts in Seattle.

This is a list of African American newspapers that have been published in the state of Washington. It includes both current and historical newspapers. The first such newspaper in Washington was the Seattle Standard, established in 1890. Notable current newspapers in Washington include The Facts and the Seattle Medium.

== Newspapers ==
- The Facts (Seattle)
- Seattle Medium
- Seattle Metro Homemaker
- Seattle Republican (defunct)
- The Tacoma True Citizen
  Front page of Cayton's Weekly from July 26, 1919.

City	Title	Beginning	End	Frequency	Call numbers	Remarks
Tacoma	Kitsap County Dispatch	1989?	1998	Weekly		Published by Virginia Taylor.
Everett	Rising Sun	1910s	?	Weekly	[OCLC 18267600] [LOCCN Sn88085811]	Published by Thomas L. Cate.
Seattle	The Advertiser’s Weekly Messenger	1964	?	Weekly	LCCN sn88085824; OCLC 18272432	
Seattle	Afro-American Journal / The Afro-American Journal	1967	1972	Weekly	LCCN sn87093328; OCLC 17242998	
Seattle	Bee	1890s	1900	Weekly		Edited by Daniel Webster Griffin.
Seattle	Bee	1906	?	Weekly		Edited by Walter Griffin.
Seattle	Builder	?	1954	Weekly		
Seattle	Cayton's Weekly (1916-1921) / Cayton's Monthly (1921)	1916	1921	Weekly, then monthly	Cayton's Weekly: ISSN 2158-4699; LCCN sn87093353, sn91025171; OCLC 17248379, 23074613; Cayton's Monthly: ISSN 2159-5569; LCCN sn87093354, sn91025172; OCLC 17248383, 23074624	Available online (Cayton's Weekly); Available online (Cayton's Monthly); Published by Horace R. Cayton Sr.
Seattle	Seattle Dispatch / The Seattle Dispatch	1946 or 1947	1948	Weekly	LCCN sn87093419, sn87093420; OCLC 9744722, 17285562, 17285563	Formerly The Pacific Dispatch of Portland, Oregon.; Absorbed the Northwest Clarion of Portland.
Seattle	Northwest Enterprise / The Northwest Enterprise / The Seattle Enterprise (1920–) / The Enterprise (–1930)	1920 or 1921	1952 or 1962	Weekly	The Northwest Enterprise: LCCN sn87093377; OCLC 17273999; The Seattle Enterprise: LCCN sn87093376; OCLC 17273985; The Enterprise: LCCN sn87093375, 2007252514; OCLC 17273968, 144552980	Available online
Seattle	The Facts / The NW Facts	1961 or 1962	current	Weekly	ISSN 0427-8879; LCCN sn94092734, sn83025152; OCLC 32785451, 9287142	Official site
Seattle	K-Zam Kazette	1962	1975	Weekly	LCCN sn88085972; OCLC 18454106, 10353400	
Seattle	Seattle Medium / The Medium (1970–1983)	1970	current	Weekly	The Medium: LCCN sn87093389; OCLC 17279382; Seattle Medium: LCCN sn8303216; OCLC 10124671	Official site
Seattle	Messenger	1964	1960s	Weekly	LCCN 2008253303, sn88085824; OCLC 264057973, 18272432	
Seattle	News Forum	1960s	?	Biweekly	LCCN 2018252404; OCLC 1022284159	Extant as of 1967.
Seattle	The Northwest Bulletin	1937	1940	Twice-monthly newspaper	LCCN sn87093423; OCLC 17285567	
Seattle	The Northwest Herald	1943	1946	Weekly	LCCN sn94081619, 2003252191, sn88085785; OCLC 32229787, 51754613, 18236862	
Seattle	Northwest Illuminator	1897 or 1898	1898	Weekly or monthly		Edited by George E. Watkins.; Regarded by competitor Horace R. Cayton Sr. as a front for the Populists.
Seattle	Seattle Observer	1964	1964?	Weekly	LCCN sn88087136; OCLC 1863451	
Seattle	Pacific Leader	1952	1956	Weekly or twice monthly	LCCN 2007252511, sn88085826; OCLC 144531109, 18276864	
Seattle	Pacific Northwest Bulletin / Pacific Northwest Review / Pacific Northwest Review Bulletin / Bulletin	1936?	1949	Twice-monthly newspaper	LCCN sn87093418; OCLC 17285402	Published by George M. Francis.
Seattle	Progressive Herald / The Progressive Herald	1933	1930s	Weekly and monthly	LCCN 2007252512, sn88085790; OCLC 144528900, 18237024	
Seattle	Puget Sound Observer (1957–1959, 1960–) / Puget Sound and Inland Empire Observer (1959–1960)	1954? or 1957	1961	Variable: weekly, twice-monthly and bimonthly	Puget Sound Observer (1957–): LCCN sn88087139; OCLC 18653640; Puget Sound and Inland Empire Observer: LCCN sn88087198; OCLC 18784577; Puget Sound Observer (1959–): LCCN 2007252161; OCLC 129926608	Published by Robert Albert.
Seattle	Renaissance Courier	1969	?	Weekly	LCCN 2008253304, sn88087006; OCLC 264079037, 18489300	Edited by H. A. Monroe Jr.
Seattle	The Seattle Republican / The Republican (1894–)	1894	1915	Weekly	The Republican: ISSN 2158-4702; LCCN sn87093448; OCLC 17291866; The Seattle Republican: ISSN 2157-3271; LCCN 2014254300, sn84025811; OCLC 701514970, 10328970	Available online (The Republican); Described by the Washington State Library as "Seattle's first truly successful African American newspaper."; Published by Horace R. Cayton Sr.
Seattle	Searchlight	1903 or 1905	1925			Founded by Rev. S.S. Freeman.
Seattle	The Skanner	1990	current	Weekly	LCCN 2001252276; OCLC 45893245, 27858413	Published in Seattle and in Portland, Oregon.
Seattle	Seattle Standard / Seattle Washington Standard	1890 or 1891	1892? or 1902	Weekly		First African American newspaper in Seattle.; Founded by former North Carolina legislator Brittain Oxendine. Taken over by Horace R. Cayton Sr. in 1892. Also edited by I. Israel Walker.
Seattle	Trumpet / The Trumpet	1966 or 1967	1970?	Monthly newspaper	LCCN sn88087005; OCLC 18489253, 10367187	Official publication of the Central Area Motivation Program.
Seattle	Western Sun	1898	1900	Weekly		Edited by Daniel Webster Griffin.; Regarded by competitor Horace R. Cayton Sr. as the successor to the Northwest Illuminator as a Populist/Fusion front.
Seattle	The World	1898	1903 or 1914	Weekly	LCCN 2013254380, sn84025812; OCLC 850980391, 10328976	Edited by Daniel Webster Griffin.
Spokane	The Citizen	1908	1913	Weekly	LCCN sn88085265; OCLC 17360663	Published by Charles Parker and Charles Barrow.; Billed as “[t]he only weekly paper devoted to promoting Race interests in the Industrial and Agricultural development of the Pacific Southwest.”
Spokane	Washington Exponent	1900	1900			Founded by John and Ella Ryan.; Supported the Democratic Party.
Spokane	Forum	1908 or 1909	1912	Monthly newspaper		Founded by Rev. J. Gordon McPherson, who previously founded the Salt Lake City Democratic Headlight in 1899.
Spokane	Northwest Echo	1896?	1896?	Weekly		Founded by Adolphus D. Griffin, who in 1896 moved to Oregon where he founded the Portland New Age.
Spokane	Northwest Review-Bulletin	1936		Biweekly		
Spokane	Star	1946		Weekly		
Spokane	Voice of the West	1913?	1915	Weekly		
Spokane	Black Lens	2015	Current	Monthly		Founded by Sandra Williams
Tacoma	Sunday Morning Echo	1907	1912	Weekly		Edited by attorney Gustave B. Aldrich.; Focused on Roman Catholics and Catholicism.
Tacoma	The Tacoma Facts	1971?	?	Weekly	LCCN sn90099775; OCLC 22261904, 22293331	Extant through at least 1980.
Tacoma	The Northwest Tacoma Facts	1970	1970s	Weekly	LCCN sn88085964; OCLC 1845964, 18452750	Published and edited by Fitzgerald Beaver.
Tacoma	The Forum	1903	1918 or 1920	Weekly	LCCN sn88085157, sn89044144; OCLC 17337015, 19714372	Founded by John Ryan. Published by Ella Ryan after 1906.; Known for its activism against racism in the Seattle area.
Tacoma	The Northwest Dispatch	1982 or 1984		5 days a week	ISSN 1058-9627; LCCN sn88085661; OCLC 18152568	Published by Virginia Taylor (1938–2001).
Tacoma	Reporter (1966–1967) / Journal Reporter (1967)	1966	1967	Weekly		
Tacoma	Northwest Journal Reporter	1970	1970s	Weekly	LCCN sn88085909; OCLC 18338783	
Tacoma	Progress Messenger	1971	1970s	Weekly	LCCN sn88085908; OCLC 18338774	
Tacoma	Tacoma True Citizen	1972?	?	Weekly	LCCN sn88087050; OCLC 18596316	Published by W. Larry Williams; Extant through at least 1976.
Tacoma	The Weekly	1903	1903	Weekly		First African American-owned newspaper in Tacoma.; Founded by John Ryan and Ella Ryan.
Vancouver	Portland Medium	1979?	?	Weekly	OCLC 37299386	Successor to the Soul Town Review.; Published by Christopher H. Bennett.

== See also ==
- List of African American newspapers and media outlets
- List of African American newspapers in Alaska
- List of African American newspapers in Montana
- List of African American newspapers in Oregon
- List of newspapers in Washington (state)

== Works cited ==
- Abajian, James De Tarr (1974). Blacks and Their Contributions to the American West: A Bibliography and Union List of Library Holdings Through 1970. G. K. Hall. ISBN 9780816111398.
- Danky, James Philip; Hady, Maureen E., eds. (1998). African-American newspapers and periodicals : a national bibliography. Harvard University Press. ISBN 9780674007888.
- Mumford, Esther Hall (1980). Seattle's black Victorians, 1852-1901. Ananse Press. ISBN 9780960567003.
- Mumford, Esther (1985). Black Heritage Survey of Washington State (PDF).
- Work, Monroe N. (1912). Negro Year Book and Annual Encyclopedia of the Negro, Volume 1.
- "The Negro in the State of Washington, 1788–1967: A Bibliography". Washington State Library.
