= Cannady =

Cannady is a surname. Notable people with the surname include:

- Beatrice Morrow Cannady (1890–1974), American civil rights advocate
- Devin Cannady (born 1996), American basketball player
- Jesse Cannady (1911–1981), American baseball player
- John Cannady (1923–2002), American football player
- Rev Cannady (1904–1981), American baseball player
- Richard Cannady (born 1935), American politician
- William T. Cannady (born 1937), American architect
