= List of African American newspapers in Kansas =

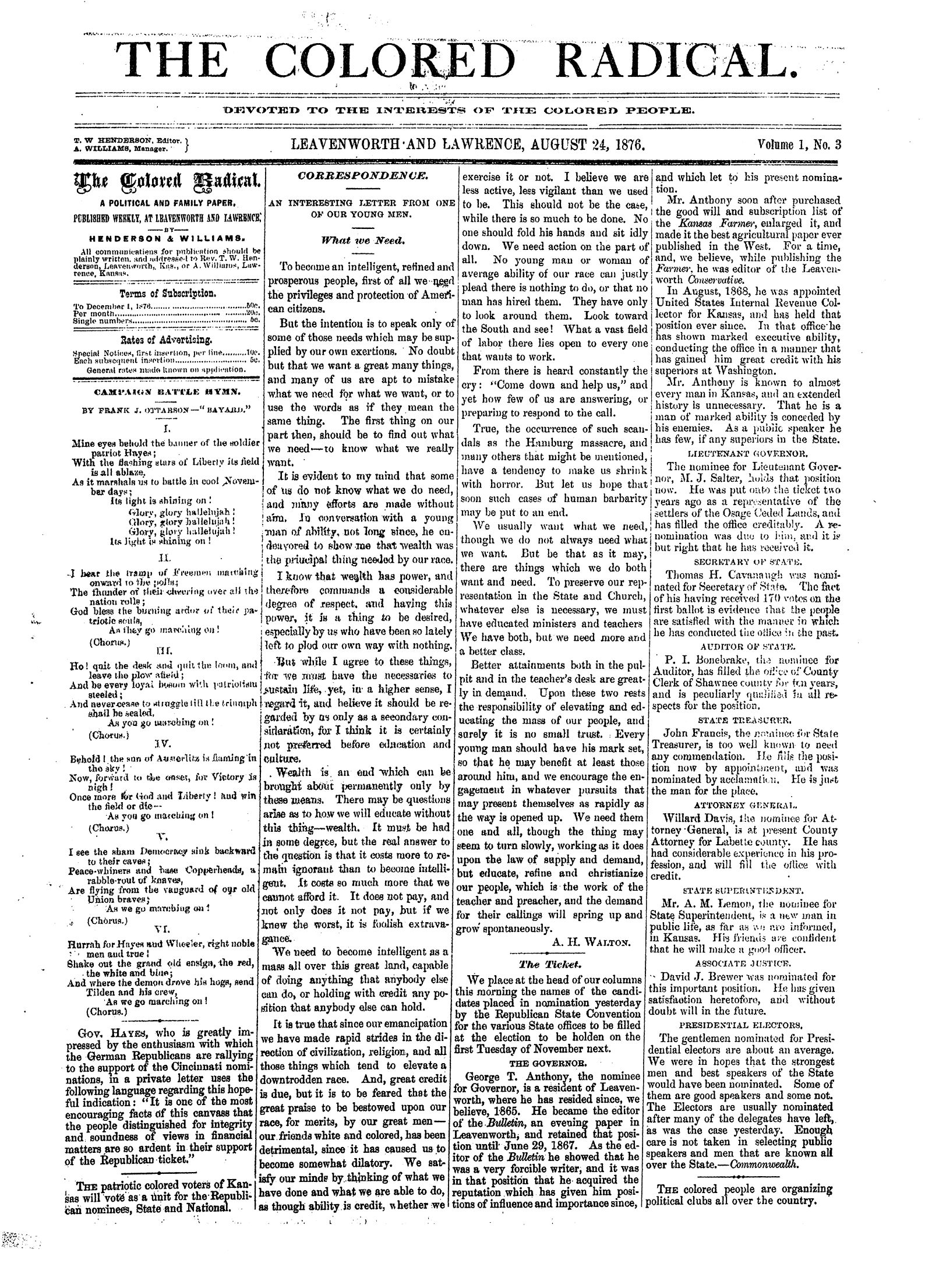
Front page of the Colored Radical of 1876.

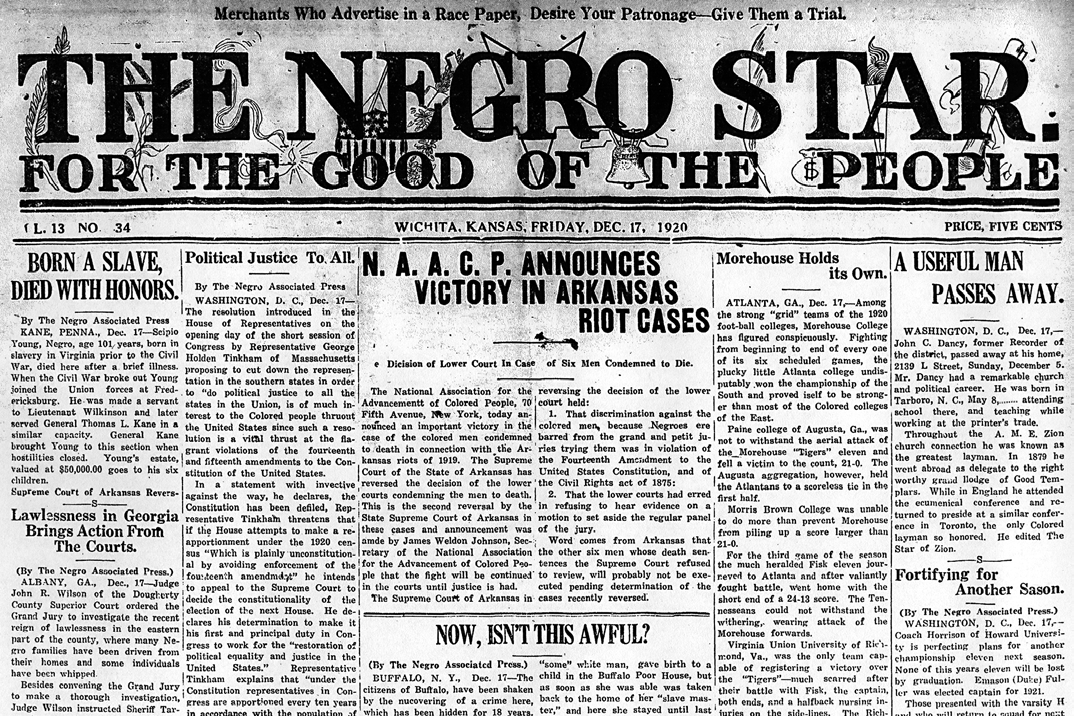
Front page of The Negro Star on December 17, 1920, announcing the NAACP's declaration of victory in the Elaine massacre cases

This is a list of African American newspapers that have been published in the state of Kansas. It includes both current and historical newspapers.

Although abolitionist newspapers were published in Kansas as early as 1854, the first Kansas newspaper published by and for African Americans was the Colored Radical, published briefly at Lawrence and Leavenworth in 1876. With resurgent white supremacy in the South and the end of the Reconstruction era after 1876, westward emigration of African Americans from the South increased greatly, and African American newspapers blossomed across the state through 1920.

== Newspapers ==
Newspapers that are currently published are highlighted in green.

City	Title	Beginning	End	Frequency	Call numbers	Remarks
Atchison	The Atchison Blade; Blade	1892	1898	Weekly	LCCN sn83040110, 2011254043; OCLC 9473982, 2640782, 708055638	
Atchison / Lawrence	Western Recorder / The Western Recorder	1883	1884	Weekly	LCCN 2013254365, sn84029569; OCLC 664618072, 11181916	Founded by John L. Waller.; Merged with the Topeka Tribune in 1885.
Cherokee	The Kansas Homestead	1889	1900	Weekly	LCCN sn84029271; OCLC 11061984	Edited and published by John L. Lewis.
Coffeyville	Afro-American Advocate	1891	1893	Weekly	LCCN 2011254022, sn85031378; OCLC 707536663, 12257763, 2611091	“Published in the interest of the Negro race of Southeast Kansas and the Freedmen of the five civilized tribes of the Indian Territory.”
Coffeyville	The American	1898	1899	Weekly	LCCN sn85031379; OCLC 12282157, 1937357	Published by Weaver & Fuller.
Coffeyville	Coffeyville Herald	1908	?	Weekly	LCCN 2011254267, sn85030460; OCLC 733374393, 12257528	
Coffeyville	The Kansas Blackman	1894	1896	Weekly	LCCN sn85067074; OCLC 12770657, 2753577	
Coffeyville	The Vindicator; Vindicator	1904	1906	Weekly	LCCN 2014254311, sn85031454; OCLC 848959648, 12257304	
Emporia	The Emporia Citizen; Emporia Citizen	1932	1932	Monthly newspaper	LCCN 2011254364, sn85030235; OCLC 748274485, 12000340	Published by Rev. C.W. Arnold.
Fort Scott / Topeka	The Colored Citizen; Colored Citizen	1878	1880	Weekly	LCCN sn83040558; OCLC 2639508	Published by Eagleson Brothers.; Motto: “AMERICA—Our Country! We Toiled for it in 1776; We Fought for it in 1812; and We Saved it in 1863.”; Moved to Topeka after six months.
Fort Scott	The Fair Play	1898	1899	Weekly	LCCN 2011254370, sn83040417; OCLC 664617134, 9675204	Edited by Jonathan C. Wood.
Fort Scott	The Messenger; Messenger	1917	1918	Weekly	LCCN sn83040373; OCLC 9693441	Edited by A.B. Johnson.
Fort Scott	The Southern Argus	1891	1892	Weekly	LCCN 2014254313, sn84029136; OCLC 879335911, 10502949, 2789518, 2789473	Published by E.M. Woods.; Published in Baxter Springs from June 18 to October 8, 1891.
Hutchinson	The Hutchinson Blade; Hutchinson Blade	1914 or 1915?	1922?	Weekly	ISSN 2575-1255; LCCN 2011254254, sn85030713; OCLC 716371699, 12347599	Variously edited and published by M.B. Brooks (1918), Chester Lewis (1919–1922), Arthur Hughes (1922), Earl C. Patton (1922).
Hutchinson	The Hutchinson Journal; Hutchinson Journal	1907?	?	Weekly	LCCN 2012254020, sn85032519; OCLC 773145769, 12387359	
Independence	The People’s Elevator	1892	1931	Weekly	LCCN sn83025058; OCLC 9237938	Place of publication varies: Guthrie, Oklahoma from 1900 to June 14, 1923; Wichita, Kansas, from February 21, 1924 to October 28, 1926.
Kansas City	Kansas City Advocate; Kansas City Independent; Kansas City Advocate and Independent	1914	1926	Weekly	ISSN 2576-0300; LCCN 2011254018, sn85032363; OCLC 707507521, 13020950	Published and edited by Thomas Kennedy.
Kansas City / Topeka	The American Citizen	1887 or 1888	1909	Weekly	LCCN sn98062574, sn85032021; OCLC 25693695, 12759891	Published by John L. Waller and R.K. Morton.; Published in Topeka from February 23, 1888 to July 19, 1889.; First Kansas African American newspaper to last more than a decade.
Kansas City	Daily American Citizen	1897 or 1898	1900	Daily (except Monday)	LCCN 2012254316, sn85066912; OCLC 747744967, 12994512	Billed as “[t]he only Daily and Weekly Negro paper in this section of the Country.”
Kansas City	The Kansas Elevator	1916	?	Weekly	LCCN sn85066947; OCLC 13025212	LCCN 2012254035, sn85066947; OCLC 773216200, 13025212; Published by Adolphus D. Griffin, previously of the Portland New Age.
Kansas City	Kansas State Globe	1983	1980s	Weekly	LCCN sn85032314; OCLC 13049324	Edited by Samuel Jordan.
Kansas City	National Review; The National Review	1913	1913	Weekly	LCCN 2013254332, sn85066903; OCLC 845106868, 13035312	
Kansas City / Topeka	The Plaindealer; The Kansas City And Topeka Plaindealer (1932–1933); Plaindealer (1933–1958); The Topeka Plaindealer (1900–1932)	1899	1958	Weekly	The Plaindealer (1899–1900): LCCN 2014254026, sn84025820; OCLC 876193307, 10337694; Kansas City and Topeka Plaindealer: LCCN 2014254024, sn85066913; OCLC 876195642, 13054981; The Topeka Plaindealer (1900–1932): LCCN 2014254025, sn85067152; OCLC 876194836, 12814874; Plaindealer (1933–1958): LCCN 2014254023, sn85032353, sn94081604; OCLC 876195800, 13055002, 32229734	Billed as "[t]he oldest race newspaper in the Southwest."; Edited initially by J.H. Childers, and from 1905 to 1930 by owner Nick Chiles.
Kansas City	The Topics; Kansas Topics; Kansas City Topics	1895	1800s	Weekly	LCCN sn85032327; OCLC 13048889	Published by John Homer Howlett & Co., edited by John Homer Howlett.
Kansas City	Western Christian Recorder	1800s	1899	Weekly	LCCN 2013254363, sn85032356; OCLC 849450612, 13049023	"Organ of the 5th Episcopal District of the A.M.E. Church."
Kansas City	Wyandotte Echo; The Wyandotte Echo	1928	?	Weekly	ISSN 2577-8617; LCCN 2013254381, sn85032354; OCLC 664611425, 5291730	
Lawrence	Harambee; For Our People	1971	1900s		LCCN 2012254015; OCLC 770747483	
Lawrence	The Historic Times	1891	1891	Weekly	LCCN 2012254017, sn84029656; OCLC 11173199, 2747403, 773109856	Merged with: Leavenworth Advocate to form the Topeka Times-Observer.; Edited by W.L. Grant.
Lawrence	Lawrence Vindicator	1870s	1870s			No issues survive; known only from mentions in the Colored Citizen.
Leavenworth	The Leavenworth Advocate	1889	1891	Weekly	LCCN 2013254029, sn85029302, sn85029303, 2013254028; OCLC 2753625, 12101792, 24612046, 12101931, 811647655	Merged with Lawrence Historic Times to form the Topeka Times-Observer.; Published by W.B. Townsend.
Leavenworth / Lawrence	Colored Radical; The Colored Radical	1876	1876	Weekly	LCCN 2013254032, sn85029266; OCLC 811647446, 12130554	Published by A. Williams. Edited by T.W. Henderson.
Leavenworth	The Leavenworth Herald	1894	1899	Weekly	LCCN 2013254048, sn85029234; OCLC 192107362, 12101951	
Nicodemus	Nicodemus Cyclone	1887	1888	Weekly	LCCN 2013254347, sn84030038; OCLC 847886014, 11364750, 2756139	Formed from merger of Western Cyclone and Nicodemus Enterprise.
Nicodemus	Nicodemus Enterprise; The Nicodemus Enterprise	1887	1887	Weekly	LCCN 2013254348, sn84030037; OCLC 847884797, 11364657, 2771075	
Nicodemus	Western Cyclone	1886	1887	Weekly	LCCN sn84030031; OCLC 11364724, 2775284	Published by A.G. Tallman.
North Topeka	Benevolent Banner; The Benevolent Banner	1887	1887	Weekly	LCCN 2011254048, sn85032037; OCLC 715482690, 12759902, 2696635	
Parsons	Eye Opener; The Eye Opener	1892	1893	Weekly	LCCN 2011254367, sn85031556; OCLC 748281399, 12247795	Published by E.M. Woods.
Parsons	The Parsons Weekly Blade; Parsons Blade; Blade	1892	1901 or 1904	Weekly	LCCN 2014254015, sn84025818; OCLC 851522168, 10337751	One of the first African American papers in the area of southern Kansas settled by the Exodusters.; Switched allegiance from the United States Republican Party to the Populists in mid-1890s.
Peru	The Freeman's` Lance	1891	1892	Weekly	LCCN 2011254383, sn83040711; OCLC 9963950, 664611230	Published by W.A. Tanksley.; Also published at times in Sedan, Kansas.
Pittsburg	The Afro-American	1903	1904			Published by A.J. Lee.; No issues survive.
Pittsburg	Afro-American Review	1915	1915			
Pittsburg	The Pittsburg Plain Dealer	1899	1900	Weekly	LCCN sn84029141; OCLC 10863953	Followed by The Wichita searchlight.; Published by W.N. Miller.
Pittsburg	The Uplift	1914	1914	Weekly	LCCN 2013254354, sn84029144; OCLC 848066293, 10848779	Published and edited by A.B. Johnson.; Strong supporter of Washingtonian ideology.
Salina	The Black Word Is..	1971	1976	Bimonthly newspaper or biweekly	LCCN sn85030803; OCLC 12608244	Continued by Ubiquity.; Published by the Black American Citizens Organization of Salina.; Edited by James Briscoe (Jomo Kenyatta).
Salina	Salina Enterprise; The Salina Enterprise	1908	1909	Weekly	LCCN 2014254309, sn85032708; OCLC 878984663, 12608482	
Stockton	Western Globe	1902	?	Biweekly	LCCN sn85029602; OCLC 12497024	Published and edited by D.J. Green.
Topeka	The American Citizen	1888	1909	Weekly	LCCN 2011254031, sn85032031; OCLC 707932655, 12759891	Published by Waller & Morton.
Topeka	The Baptist Headlight	1893	1894	Weekly	LCCN 2017225070, sn88086003; OCLC 999819602, 17338541	
Topeka	The Colored Citizen	1897	1900	Weekly	ISSN 2643-0983; LCCN 2017225074, sn85067023; OCLC 999822749, 12771625	Published by Eagleson & Holloway.
Topeka	The Colored Patriot	1882	1800s	Weekly	LCCN 2011254295, sn85067024; OCLC 745920185, 12771653, 2637176	Published by attorney E.H. White.
Topeka	Daily Ledger	1893	1893	Daily	LCCN sn85067118; OCLC 12849949	Edited by Fred L. Jeltz.
Topeka	Topeka Ebony Times	1973	1978			"[C]ommitted to Black Liberation, Black Unity and Black Progress in a constructive manner."
Topeka	The Evening Call	1891	1893	Daily (except Sunday)	LCCN 2011254366, sn85032047; OCLC 748280004, 12849982	
Topeka	Herald of Kansas; Kansas Weekly Herald; Kansas Herald	1880	1880	Weekly	Herald of Kansas: LCCN sn850672225; OCLC 12788920; Kansas Weekly Herald: LCCN 2012254008, sn85067092; OCLC 773098035, 12851084	Edited and published by H.C. Rutherford and W.L. Eagleson.
Topeka	The Kansas Baptist Herald	1911	1910s	Monthly newspaper	LCCN 2012254033, sn85067234; OCLC 773216053, 12893127	
Topeka	The Kansas Blackman	1894	?	Weekly	LCCN 2012254034, sn85067074; OCLC 773217971, 12770657	Published by W.D. Driver
Topeka	Kansas Sentinel; The Kansas Sentinel	1960	1964	Weekly	LCCN 2013254038, sn85067098; OCLC 811578614, 12849741	Suspended with November 26, 1960 issue and resumed with June 6, 1964 issue.; Published by C & C Enterprises.
Topeka	Kansas State Tribune; Topeka Tribune (1880)	1880	1880s	Weekly	LCCN 2013254039, sn85067249; OCLC 811624108, 12789270	Edited by attorney E.H. White.; Changed name to Kansas State Tribune after switching affiliations from the Republican Party to the National Labor Greenback Party.
Topeka	The Kansas Watchman	1903?	?	Weekly	LCCN sn85067109; OCLC 12793750	Published by G.W. Harts.
Topeka	The Kansas Whip; Kansas Eagle; The Kansas American	1933?	1956	Weekly	The Kansas Whip (1933–1934): LCCN 2013254044; OCLC 664617338; The Kansas Eagle (1934–1935): LCCN 2013254035; OCLC 811643623; The Kansas American (1936–1956): LCCN sn85067073, 2013254382; OCLC 811641774, 12770637	Billed in 1930s as the "[o]nly colored democratic paper in Kansas."
Topeka	The Little Weekly	1929?	?	Weekly	LCCN 2013254303, sn85067122; OCLC 843962890, 12849750	Attested through at least 1938.
Topeka	Topeka Messenger	1969	1970	Weekly	LCCN 2014254323, sn85067123; OCLC 879348595, 12814230	
Topeka	National Watchman; The National Watchman	1905?	?	Weekly	LCCN sn96080148, sn85067124, 2013254334; OCLC 34505129, 12893178, 845105003	Published by P.C. Thomas.
Topeka	Topeka Post-Review	1970	1900s	Weekly	LCCN 2014254322, sn85067155; OCLC 879348953, 12849832	Attested through at least 1971.
Topeka	The Topeka Sentinel	1994		Semimonthly	ISSN 1079-1965; LCCN sn940931; OCLC 31348437	
Topeka	The State Ledger; Kansas State Ledger (1894–1906); The Kansas State Ledger(1892–1894)	1892	1906	Weekly	LCCN sn85067105, sn85067106; OCLC 26648604, 12789167, 12800834, 2753592	Published and edited by Fred L. Jeltz.
Topeka	The Times-Observer	1891	1892	Weekly	LCCN 2013254030, sn85067184; OCLC 843766759, 12833065	
Topeka	The Topeka Tribune and Western Recorder	1885	1885	Weekly	LCCN 2014254316, sn85067189; OCLC 879349331, 12878063	
Topeka	The Weekly Call; The Topeka Call (1891–1893)	1891	1898	Weekly	The Weekly Call: LCCN 2014254049, sn85032048; OCLC 879347683, 12886332; The Topeka Call: LCCN 2014254048, sn85032049; OCLC 879348213, 12833159	Edited by W.M. Pope.
Weir	Weir City Eagle	1899	1900?	Weekly	LCCN sn83041035, 2013254361; OCLC 849419105, 10504077	
Wichita	The American Times; American Times	1908	?	Weekly	LCCN 2011254041, sn85032458; OCLC 707937935, 12714513	
Wichita	The Colored Citizen; Colored Citizen	1902	1904	Weekly	LCCN sn85032421, 2011254293; OCLC 12607567, 745926338	Published by E. Harrison.
Wichita	The Community Voice	1995	current	Biweekly	ISSN 1090-3852; LCCN sn96003407; OCLC 34239207	Official site; Co-published by Billy and Wyvette McCray.
Wichita	The Wichita Factarian; Wichita Factarian	1913?	1914	Weekly	LCCN 2013254367, sn85032574; OCLC 850614558, 12640572	
Wichita	Wichita Globe	1887	1887	Weekly	LCCN 2013254368, sn85032447; OCLC 850605497, 12646508	Edited by D.L. Roberson.
Wichita	Kansas Black Journal	1983	1985	Twice monthly	LCCN sn85032543; OCLC 12616656	Published by L.V. Jack Hudson.
Wichita	The Kansas Headlight	1894	1894	Weekly	LCCN 2013254036, sn85032460; OCLC 811578081, 12714539	Motto: "A fearless advocate of the rights of a worthy people."; Published by W.A. Bettis.
Wichita	Kansas Sunflower; The Kansas Sunflower	1890	1890	Weekly	LCCN sn85032469; OCLC 12703355	Published by J.B. Gibbs.
Wichita	Kansas Voice; The Kansas Voice	1946?	?	Unknown	LCCN 2013254041, sn85032470; OCLC 811578120, 12714720	Published by George Brock.
Wichita	Kansas Weekly Journal	1970s or 1980	1981	Weekly	LCCN 2013254043, sn85032542; OCLC 811625534, 12616798	Published by L.V. Hudson.
Wichita	Midwest News Press; The Midwest News Press	1958?	?	Bimonthly	LCCN sn85032472, 2013254315; OCLC 12714685, 844122495	Attested through at least 1959.
Wichita	National Baptist World	1894	1894	Weekly		
Wichita	The National Reflector: for the Afro-American Race	1895	1897 or 1898	Weekly	LCCN 2013254333, sn85032590; OCLC 845104741, 12617059	
Wichita	The Negro Star	1908	1953	Weekly	ISSN 2642-7621, 2642-7613; LCCN 2013254336, sn97016157, sn85032569; OCLC 664611331, 37664416, 12617095	Published and edited by H.T. Sims.
Wichita	News Hawk; The News Hawk	1973?	?	Weekly	LCCN 2013254346, sn85032473; OCLC 847881030, 12714672	Published and edited by Leonard Garrett.
Topeka	The People’s Friend	1894	1896	Weekly	LCCN sn84025836, 2014254018; OCLC 876081908, 10380169, 2772303	Place of publication varies: published in Wichita on at least December 11, 1896.; Edited by William Jeltz.
Wichita	Wichita Post Observer; The Post Observer	1953	1954	Weekly	LCCN 2013254369; OCLC 664618075; The Post Observer: LCCN 2013254370, sn85032583; OCLC 850668541, 12624686	
Wichita	The Wichita Protest	1918?	?	Weekly	LCCN 2013254371; OCLC 850605800	Edited by W. A. Bettis.
Wichita	The Wichita Searchlight; The Searchlight	1900	1912	Weekly	LCCN 2013254372, sn85032585; OCLC 840119025, 12671281	Published by Miller & Lewis.
Wichita	The Wichita Times	1970	1977?	Weekly	LCCN sn85032541, 2013254373; OCLC 12607511, 850722511	L.V. "Jack" Hudson.
Wichita	Wichita Tribune; The Wichita Tribune	1898	1899	Weekly	LCCN sn84025832; OCLC 10372415, 2775179	Published by Robinson & Covington.

== See also ==
- List of African American newspapers and media outlets
- List of African American newspapers in Colorado
- List of African American newspapers in Missouri
- List of African American newspapers in Nebraska
- List of African American newspapers in Oklahoma
- List of newspapers in Kansas

== Works cited ==
- Danky, James Philip; Hady, Maureen E., eds. (1998). African-American newspapers and periodicals : a national bibliography. Harvard University Press. ISBN 9780674007888.
- Smith, Dorothy V. (1996). "The Black Press and the Search for Hope and Equality in Kansas, 1865-1985". In Suggs, Henry Lewis (ed.). The Black Press in the Middle West, 1865-1985.
