= James Merriman =

James Merriman may refer to:

- James Merriman (soccer) (born 1985), Canadian soccer coach
- James Merriman (politician) (1816–1883), Australian politician
- James Merriman (rugby union) (born 1984), Welsh rugby union player
- James A. Merriman (1869–1946), American physician and newspaper publisher
