= Littig, Texas =

Littig
- Unincorporated community
- Location within the state of Texas Littig (the United States)
- Coordinates: 30°19′11″N 97°26′58″W
- Country: United States
- State: Texas
- County: Travis
- Time zone: UTC-6 (Central (CST))
  - Summer (DST): UTC-5 (CDT)
- GNIS feature ID: 1340003

Littig /ˈlɪtɪɡ/ is a small unincorporated community in eastern Travis County, Texas, United States. According to the Handbook of Texas, the community had a population of 37 in 2000. It is located within the Greater Austin metropolitan area.

== History ==
One of the state's oldest Black communities is claimed to exist there. On land donated by a former slave named Jackson Morrow, the townsite was established in 1883. The former general division agent of the Houston and Texas Central Railway, A. B. Littig, who conducted the townsite survey, is honored by the town's name. A church was erected in 1887 on land that J. W. Bitting gave as a gift. There was a post office founded in 1889, with Thomas B. Fowler and Jackson Morrow serving as the postmasters. In 1900, Littig had 168 persons, a general store, two cotton gins, and three churches. The town's population dropped from an estimated 150 in 1936 to 35 by the 1940s as a result of the community's collapse that started in the 1930s. After the Littig post office was burned down in 1954, it received its mail from Elgin. On topographic maps of the region from the 1980s, the village was indicated by a church and some houses. 37 people were reportedly living in Littig between the late 1960s and 2000.

== Geography ==
Littig is located on the Southern Pacific Railroad, 2 mi (3.2 km) south of U.S. Highway 290 and 18 mi (29 km) northeast of Austin in eastern Travis County.

Littig is surrounded by blackland prairie soil, suitable for growing cotton, maize and corn. An important creek, part of the watershed, meanders along the Southern Pacific right-of-way with numerous wooden trestles near Littig. The Littig Cemetery is located nearby.

== Education ==
J.W. Bitting gave a grant of land for a school to be built in 1887. Three one-teacher schools serving 185 Black children and one one-teacher school serving 33 White children made up the Littig Common School District in 1907. In 1952, the Manda district merged with the Littig schools.

Today, the community is served by the Manor Independent School District. Schools serving the community are Presidential Meadows Elementary School, Manor Middle School, and Manor High School.

== Notable person ==
Beatrice Morrow Cannady, civil rights activist, was born in Littig.
