= Colored Radical =

1876 African American newspaper in Kansas

- "Devoted to the interests of the colored people"
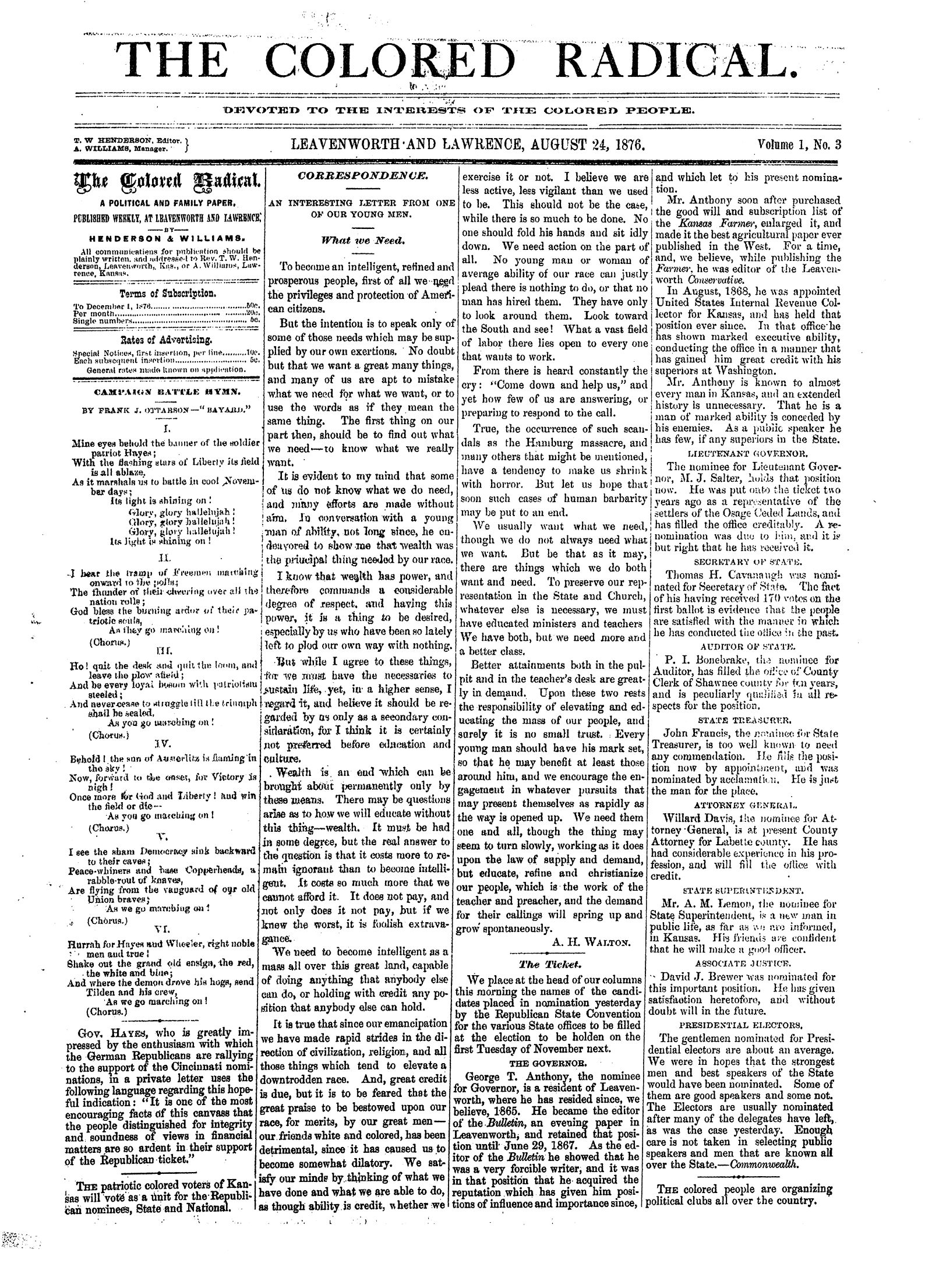
- Front page of the first issue of the Colored Radical
- Type: African American weekly newspaper
- Founded: August 24, 1876
- Ceased publication: November 16, 1876
- Headquarters: Leavenworth, Kansas, U.S.

The Colored Radical was an African American newspaper in Kansas. It was the first black newspaper in the state and was published in Lawrence and Leavenworth for just under three months in 1876. The paper supported the Kansas Republican Party during the that year's elections, argued against racial segregation, and reported on lynchings like the Hamburg massacre in Hamburg, South Carolina. Following the conclusion of the elections, the paper dissolved, and only five of its fourteen issues are extant.

== Publication and contents ==
The Colored Radical was the first black newspaper in the state of Kansas, published jointly in Lawrence and Leavenworth. T. W. Henderson and A. T. Williams were its editors, both of them black ministers. It was first published on August 24, 1876, in the aftermath of the Emancipation Proclamation and the subsequent flight of black people out of the American South into Kansas. A subscription to the paper cost $0.50, and it was produced by the same printers as the Kansas Daily Tribune.

It was a mouthpiece for the Kansas Republican Party in the 1876 United States elections. Its reporting base was wide geographically; as far south and east as Mississippi provided it with information. It was staunchly anti-segregation, criticizing the existence of a bipartite educational system, where white and black children would attend separate schools. It called the lynching in Hamburg, South Carolina—dubbed the Hamburg massacre—one of the "darkest chapters in American society". Although it was at times critical in tone, it also provided optimistic news for black Kansans, and urged them to become self-reliant through property acquisitions and maintenance.

The last issue of the paper was published on November 16, 1876, shortly after the elections concluded. Two years following its closure, W. L. Eagleson established a black newspaper in Fort Scott, then later Topeka, called the Colored Citizen. Henderson joined Eagleson in editing that paper. (Note: Henderson later entered politics. After failing to be nominated to run for lieutenant governor alongside John St. John, he was elected chaplain of the Kansas House of Representatives, and served two terms on the Lawrence Board of Education.) Of the fourteen issues of the Colored Radical, only five survive.

== Notes and references ==
=== Bibliography ===
- Eberle, Mark E. (2022). William Lewis Eagleson and the origins of African American newspapers in Kansas. Fort Hays State University.
- Foner, Philip S. (1978). "Black participation in the centennial of 1876". Phylon. 39 (4): 283–296. doi:10.2307/274895. ISSN 0031-8906. JSTOR 274895.
- Smith, Dorothy V. (1996). "The black press and the search for hope and equality in Kansas, 1865-1985". In Suggs, Henry Lewis (ed.). The black press in the middle west, 1865-1985. Greenwood Press.
- Hartshorn, W.N.; Penniman, George W. (1910). An era of progress and promise, 1863–1910: The religious, moral, and educational development of the American negro since his emancipation. OCLC 5343815. Published following the 1908 Clifton Conference, attended by officials from several black colleges and universities.
