= Clarion Defender =

American newspaper

- Oldest Negro Publisher in the Northwest
- Type: Weekly newspaper
- Founder: Jimmy "Bang-Bang" Walker
- Editor: Jimmy "Bang-Bang" Walker
- Founded: 1966
- Ceased publication: 1973[?]
- City: Portland, Oregon
- OCLC number: 44631946
- Free online archives: Portland State University Library

The Clarion Defender was an African American run newspaper in Portland, Oregon. It operated from 1966 until around 1973 and was founded by Jimmy "Bang Bang" Walker. Its motto was, "Oldest Negro Publisher in the Northwest."

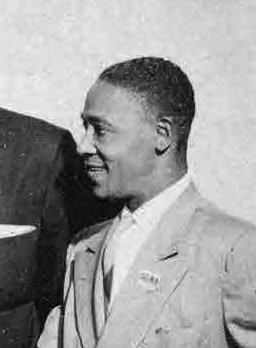
Arthur A. Cox, Sr., one of the original publishers of the Northwest Clarion, photographed in 1962

The Northwest Clarion, initially published between 1943 and 1961, was revived under the direction of civil rights advocate and African American journalist Jimmy "Bang-Bang" Walker. In January 1962, Jimmy "Bang-Bang" Walker took an investment of $15,000 and founded, edited, and published the Northwest Defender. Five years later Walker took over the Northwest Clarion, which had suspended publication, and renamed it the Clarion Defender. The paper was alternately known as the Northwest Clarion Defender and New Northwest Clarion Defender. It was located at 1223 NE Alberta Street (Portland, Oregon). In addition to the Clarion Defender, the city also had the Portland Challenger (1952–1954), the Portland Times (1918–1920), and numerous other African American newspapers that lasted a year or less with a few dating back to the 1890s.

The Clarion Defender focused attention on the impact of local issues on African-Americans and routinely used the newspaper to expose purported police brutality. In reaction to the assassination of Dr. Martin Luther King, Jr., Walker used the paper to express continued commitment to Dr. King's goals and non-violent approach to achieve them.

== Jimmy "Bang-Bang" Walker ==
James Zell "Jimmy" Walker, Jr. was born on March 23, 1932, in Birmingham, Alabama to Emma Lou and James Zell Walker, Sr. Jimmy had a brother by the name of Ivory Mitchell Walker, half-brothers Grady William "Sonny" Owens, and Harvey Lee Black, Jr., sister Denise Walker, and half-sister Gail V. Black.

Jimmy's father died in 1936 when Jimmy was four years old. The family then moved to Vallejo, California. In 1940 at the age of eight, Jimmy was making $25.00 a week selling newspapers and picking fruit. Jimmy remembers: “Our mother taught us to be proud. That hard work is the foundation for good health and a good mind. We never went on welfare, we all worked.” In 1941, Jimmy won the California Junior Golden Gloves in his division for boxing, and in high school he had won letters in all four available sports: football, basketball, baseball and track.

On October 4, 2005, Jimmy "Bang-Bang" Walker died at age 73 due to natural causes at his home in North Portland, Oregon. On October 8, 2005, a service was held at the Jefferson High School auditorium in his honor. Walker was deeply appreciated by his community. "It's a real loss to the African American community in terms of the commitment that he had to fostering our community, helping young men and women to take pride in and learn about their culture," said Halim Rahsaan, a former amateur boxer. Tony Hopson, who was founder, President, and chief executive officer of Self Enhancement Inc. said, "He was a real role model... at a time when a lot of folks of color in this city weren't as eager to jump out there and try new things, he did the Miss Tan America Beauty Pageant at a time when folks needed to feel good about themselves, and really weren't in a position to compete in some of the other kinds of pageants. We looked at that as a real positive."

== See also ==
- Oregon Mirror, another paper edited by Walker
