= Frances Haskell =

American politician (1871–1974)

Member of the Washington House of Representatives from the 38th district
- In office January 13, 1919 – January 10, 1921 Serving with George W. Thompson
- Preceded by: Hiram E. Washburn
- Succeeded by: John Henry Ryan

Personal details
- Born: 1871 New York, United States
- Died: November 26, 1947 (aged 75–76) Tacoma, Washington, United States
- Party: Republican
- Spouse: Herbert B. Haskell

Frances Haskell (1871 – November 26, 1947) was an American politician who served in the Washington House of Representatives for the 38th district from 1919 to 1921. In 1919, she was the first woman in Washington State history to preside over the Washington House of Representatives.

Haskell introduced the Federal Suffrage Amendment upon ratification on March 22, 1920, and led in legislation that required equal pay for male and female teachers.
