= John Henry Ryan =

American politician

Frances Haskell

Member of the Washington House of Representatives from the 38th district
- In office January 10, 1921 – January 12, 1925
- Preceded by: Frances Haskell
- Succeeded by: Dean C. McLean
- In office January 12, 1931 – January 9, 1933
- Preceded by: Alfred J. Smith
- Succeeded by: C. E. McIntosh

Member of the Washington Senate from the 28th district
- In office January 9, 1933 – January 11, 1937
- Preceded by: Ray Jacobus
- Succeeded by: Monty Percival

Member of the Washington House of Representatives from the 28th district
- In office January 13, 1941 – January 11, 1943
- Preceded by: Gerald G. Dixon
- Succeeded by: Winifred C. P. Meddins

Personal details
- Born: August 6, 1865 Chillicothe, Ohio, U.S.
- Died: January 20, 1943 (aged 77) Tacoma, Washington, U.S.
- Party: Farmer–Labor Party; Republican Party; Democratic Party
- Spouse: Ella Ryan
- Occupation: Newspaper editor

John Henry Ryan (1865 - 1943) was a businessman, newspaperman, and state legislator in the U.S. state of Washington. He was a member of the NAACP.

Ryan and his wife, Ella, published The Weekly and then The Forum newspapers.

== Biography ==
He was born in Chillicothe, Ohio and was one of 12 children born to George R. and Mary Elizabeth (Gatliffe) Ryan. His grandmother was Cherokee.

He married Ella Alexander and moved to Spokane, Washington in 1889. They briefly moved to Seattle before settling in Tacoma, Washington in 1903. The Ryans briefly published The Weekly, the city's first black-owned newspaper, but abandoned the paper to start The Forum in July 1903. John and Ell were charter members of the Tacoma NAACP and the Republican Party. Ryan compiled Ryan's Legislative Manual published in 1907.

Ryan was elected to the 38th district of the Washington House of Representatives in 1921 as a member of the Farmer–Labor Party. He was the only African American serving in the Washington House of Representatives at the time. He helped defeat a proposal for an anti-intermarriage bill.

Ryan would serve in the 38th district from 1921 to 1925, and again from 1931 to 1933 as a Republican. He then served in the Washington State Senate for the 28th district from 1933 to 1937 as a Democrat. In that session, he opposed a proposed bill that would require fingerprinting vagrants. Ryan served in the House again for the 28th district from 1941 to 1932.

He changed his name to Senator J. H. Ryan. He published Ryan's Weekly.

Ryan died on January 20, 1943, in a private nursing home.

== See also ==
- Horace R. Cayton Sr., editor of the Seattle Republican

== See also ==
- List of African-American officeholders (1900–1959)
- Rosa Gourdine Franklin
