= The Forum (Tacoma) =

African American newspaper in Tacoma, Washington

- Type: Weekly newspaper
- Founder(s): John Henry Ryan and Ella Ryan
- Publisher: Graham–Hickman Co.
- Editor: Ella Ryan and John Henry Ryan
- Founded: July 3, 1903
- Ceased publication: December 28, 1918

The Forum was an African-American owned newspaper founded by John Henry Ryan and Ella Ryan and published by the Graham–Hickman Company weekly from 1903 to 1918 covering the Tacoma area of the U.S. state of Washington. It was founded on July 3, 1903 and ceased publication on December 28, 1918. While the second page of the paper contained black society news, the paper covered mostly local politics and had mainly white readers and advertisers. The Forum published occasional reprinted pieces from other publications with black interests. In 1906, Ella became sole publisher and editor. John was still listed on the masthead as editor, although he pursued a political career.

== History ==
John Henry Ryan and Ella Ryan were African American business owners. They owned The Forum and were the editors. The Forum was the first African American owned weekly newspaper.

In 1903, The Forum merged with the Tacoma Sun, a weekly newspaper that had been publishing for 12 years.

In 1906, Ella Ryan became sole publisher and editor. John Henry Ryan was still listed on the masthead as editor, although he pursued a political career. John would go on to be the first African American elected to the Washington state senate.

== See also ==
- List of African-American newspapers in Washington (state)
