= James A. Merriman =

American physician and newspaper publisher

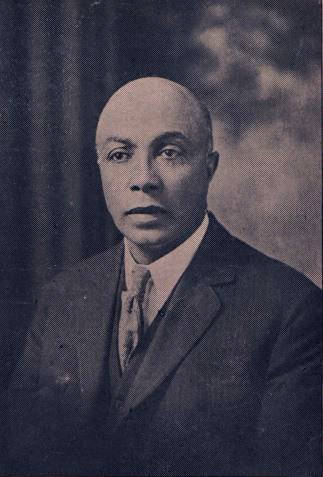
- Born: October 10, 1869; Camden
- Died: December 14, 1946; Provident Hospital of Cook County
- Education: Talladega College, Rush Medical College
- Occupations: Medical doctor, newspaper proprietor

James Anthony Merriman (October 10, 1869 – December 14, 1946) was an American physician and newspaper publisher. Merriman was the first African American physician to practice medicine in Portland, and perhaps the first in the state of Oregon; he was recruited to care for Black workers of the Union Pacific Railroad in 1903. He was a cofounder of Portland's second Black newspaper, The Advocate, and edited The Portland Times from 1913 until 1926. Merriman was also active in civil rights and community leadership, serving as the first president of the Portland chapter of the NAACP.

== Early life and education ==
J. A. Merriman was born October 10, 1869, in Camden, Alabama. His parents were John Merriman, a farmer from Alabama, and Georgia Burke, from South Carolina.

He attended Talladega College, graduating in 1891. Merriman received his M.D. from Rush Medical College in Chicago in 1902. He was the only Black graduate from Rush Medical College that year.

== Career as a physician ==
Merriman came to Portland in 1903 where he passed the Oregon medical examination in June and started practicing medicine in Portland that August, becoming the first African American physician in the city. Merriman may have been the first African American physician in Oregon. He was recruited to Portland by the Union Pacific Railroad which required a Black physician to care for its Black workers, who were employed as porters, stewards, cooks, and barbers.

By 1910, he had joined his practice with Dr. Stanley Lucas. Merriman recruited Black physician DeNorval Unthank to Portland to take his place caring for Black workers of the Union Pacific.

Merriman moved to Phoenix, Arizona in 1931, leaving Unthank as the only Black physician remaining in Portland. He practiced as a physician in Phoenix for fourteen years.

== Newspaper work ==
Along with other local Black entrepreneurs, Merriam cofounded Portland's second Black newspaper, The Advocate, in 1903. Merriman was also the editor of The Portland Times, an African American newspaper, and served as Vice President of the Times Publishing Company. He would work in the role of editor from the founding of the Times in 1913 until 1926.

== Civil rights and community leadership ==
Merriman was the first president of the Portland branch of the NAACP, which was founded in 1914. With Merriman in a leadership role, in 1915 the Portland NAACP convinced the Portland City Council to ban the showing of any film promoting racial hatred (after the council members watched The Birth of a Nation).

During World War I, he was appointed as a Four Minute Man and was enrolled as a member of the Volunteer Medical Service Corps.

While living in Portland he was heavily involved in the community, moderating local forums, directing church plays, and serving as the president of a literary society. He was a member of the Mystic Shriners, Improved Benevolent and Protective Order of Elks of the World, Knights of Pythias of North America, South America, Europe, Asia, Africa and Australia, and a 32nd degree Scottish Rite Mason of Prince Hall Freemasonry. He was also chairman of the trustee board of William H. Patterson Elks Lodge in Phoenix, and helped plan the building of the Elks lodge building at 1007 South Seventh Avenue, which was finished a few months before his death.

== Personal life and death ==
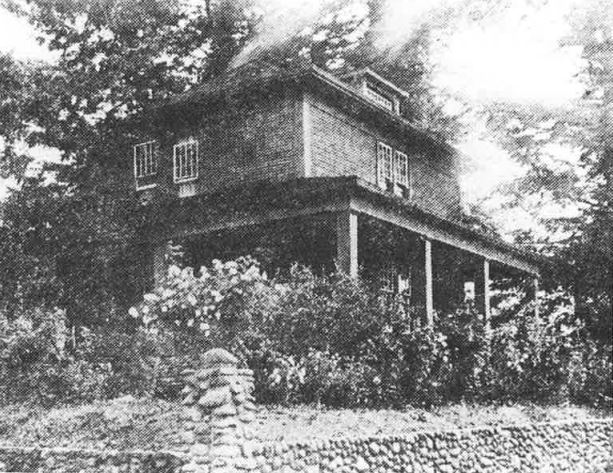
Merriman's residence at 1463 NE Prescott Street in Portland.

Merriman was married to Mabel Jones; they had two children together, Robert E. and Louise (Coles).

Merriman was ill the last year of his life, and in September 1946 he was moved from his home in Phoenix to his daughter's home in Chicago. He died at the Provident Hospital in Chicago on December 14, 1946.
