= William T. Cannady =

American architect

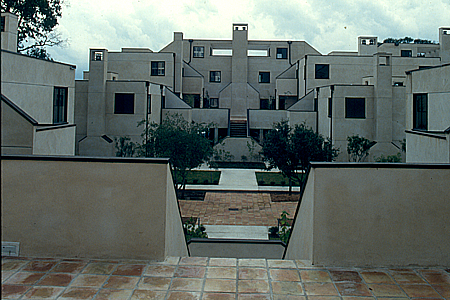
Lovett Square Condominiums

William T. Cannady (born 1937) is an American architect who has designed over two hundred projects. He is also a professor of architecture who has taught design to over one thousand students.

Cannady was born in Houston, Texas. He attended Thomas Jefferson High School in Port Arthur, Texas, receiving his diploma in 1956. He attended Texas A&M College from 1956 to 1960, he received his B.Arch. from the University of California, Berkeley in 1961, and his M.Arch. from Harvard University in 1962. Spouse was named Mollie Cannady. From there they had two daughters. Sarah Cannady and Lucinda Cannady. An architect in practice in Houston, Texas since 1965, he founded Wm. T. Cannady & Associates, Inc. in 1972. As the firm grew its name changed to Cannady, Jackson & Ryan and then Bricker & Cannady. Cannady and his firm have earned acclaim for a wide range of designs for residential, religious, commercial and public facilities. Since 1964, Cannady has been a professor of architecture at the Rice School of Architecture at Rice University.

Cannady was elected a Fellow in the American Institute of Architects in 1979. Cannady and his firm have won over sixty design awards including two Progressive Architecture awards and two Architectural Record House awards.

Cannady earned the Boy Scouts of America Eagle Scout in 1953. He also served in the U.S. Marine Corps Reserve from 1954 to 1962, receiving an honorable discharge.

== Selected buildings ==
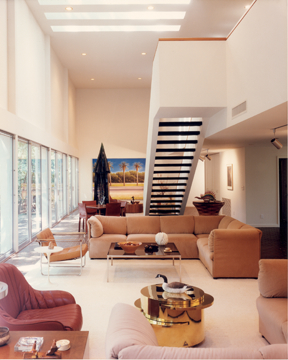
Brochstein House

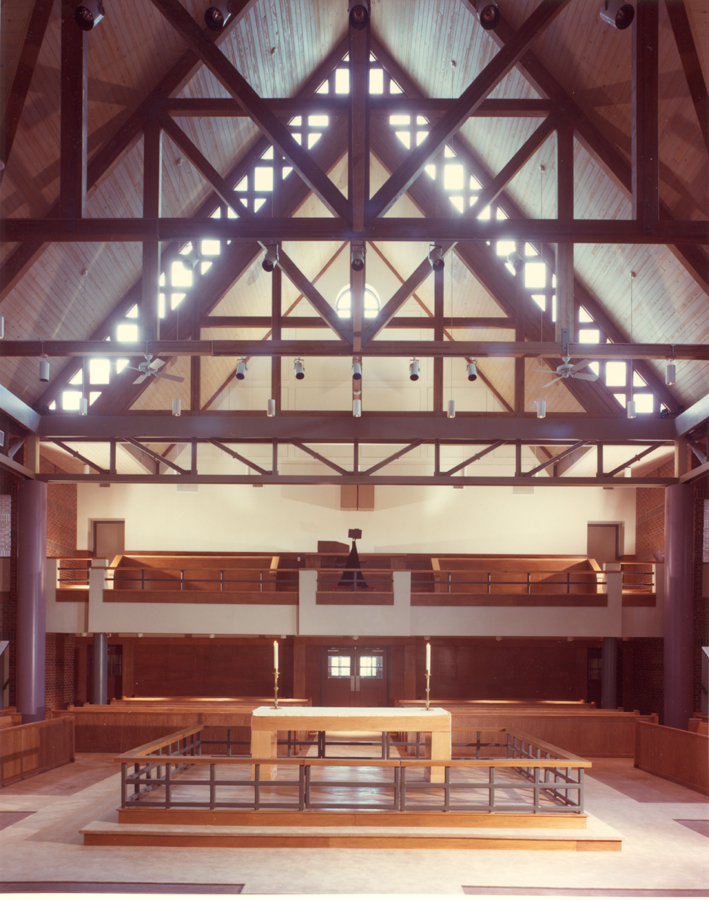
Church of the Good Shepherd

- St. Barnabas Episcopal Church, 1965
- Cannady House I, 1972
- Brochstein House, 1972
- Cannady Ranch, 1982
- Lovett Square Townhouses, 1979
- Fayette Savings Bank, 1983
- Episcopal Church of the Good Shepherd, 1981
- Schulte Ranch House, 1986
- Cannady House III, 1991
- Northern Trust Bank, 1993
- E. B. Cape Public Works Training Center, 1996
- Hakeem Olajuwon House, 1996
- McLean-Williams House, 2001
- Houston Area Women's Center, 2001
- Slade House, 2003

== Writings ==
The Things They’ve Done: A book about the careers of selected graduates of the Rice University School of Architecture, Wm. T. Cannady, FAIA, 2008

== Images ==
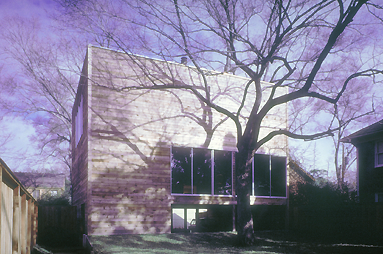
Cannady House, 1972

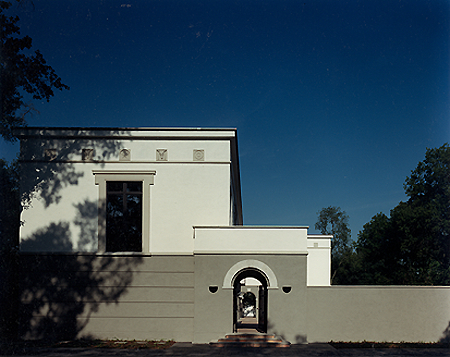
Cannady House, 1991

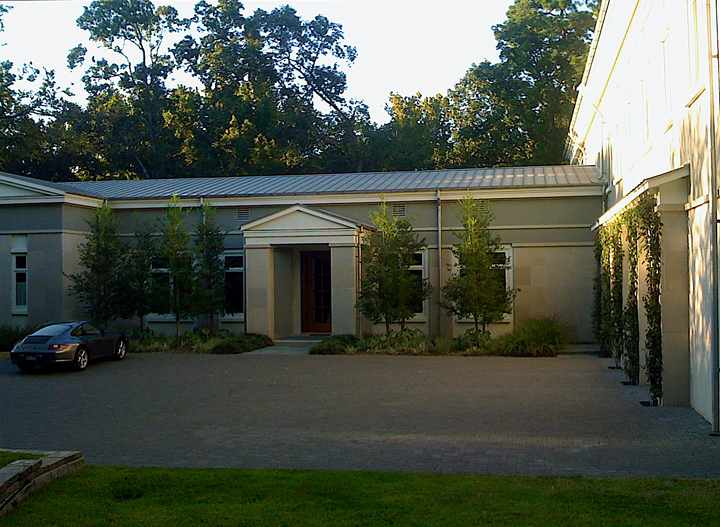
Slade House

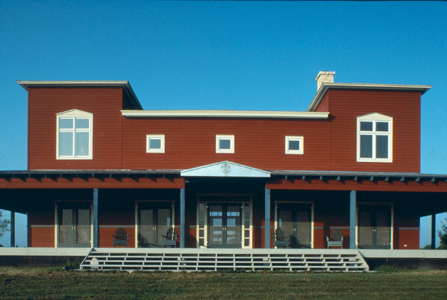
Schulte Ranch

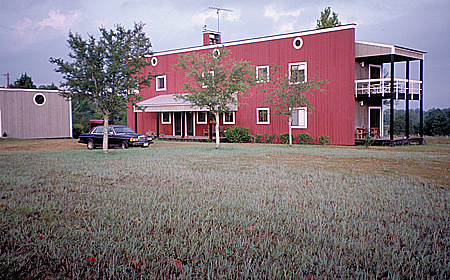
Cannady Ranch

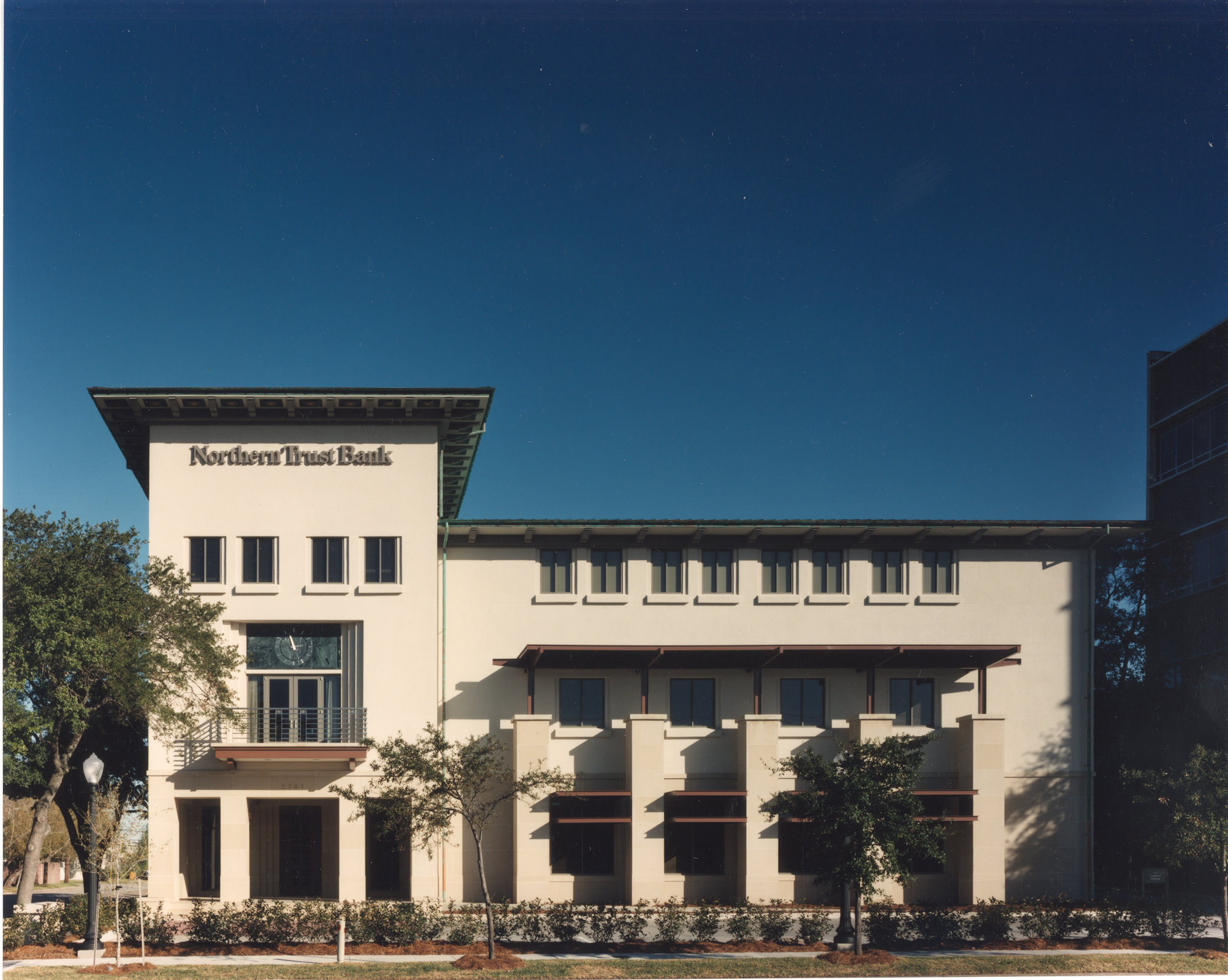
Northern Trust Bank

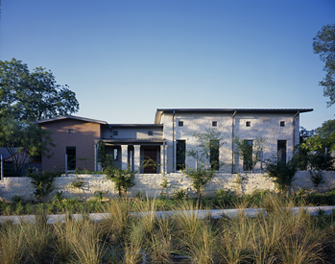
McLean-Williams Residence

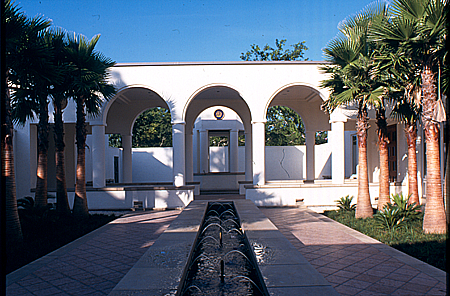
Olajuwon Residence

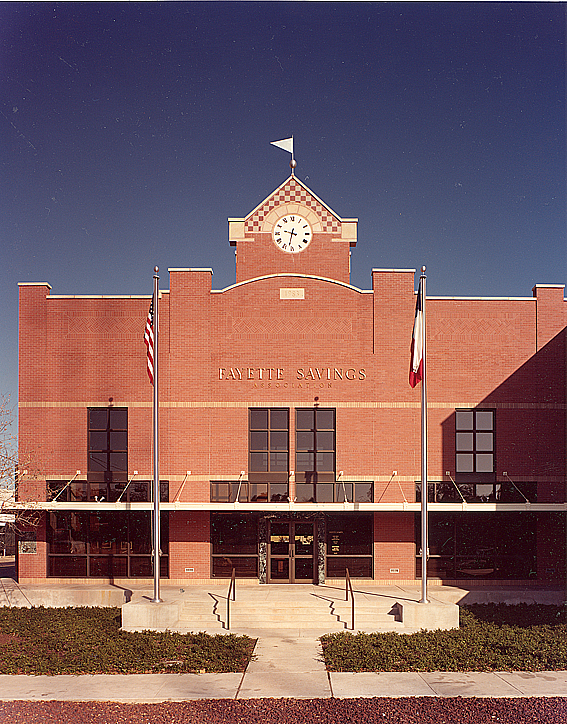
Fayette Savings Association

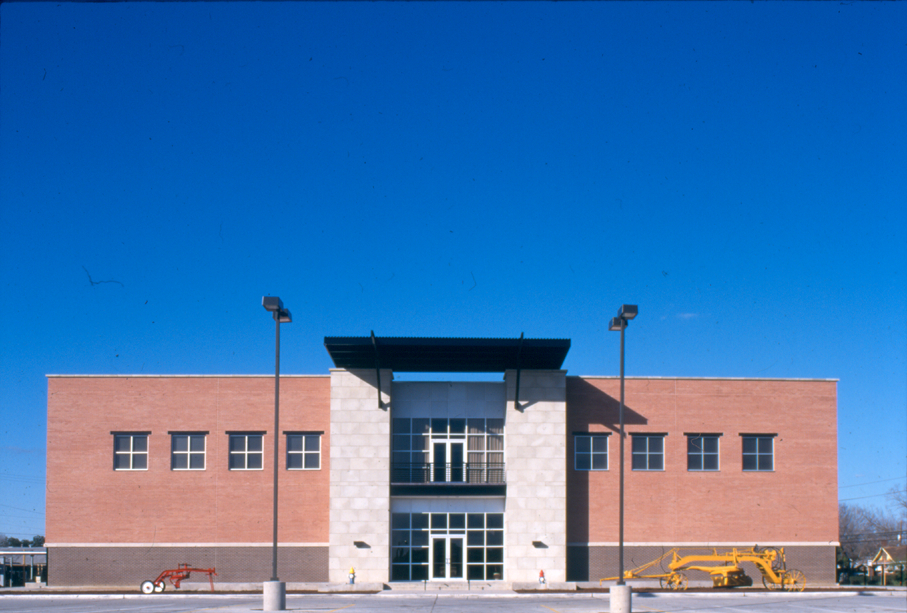
EB Cape Center

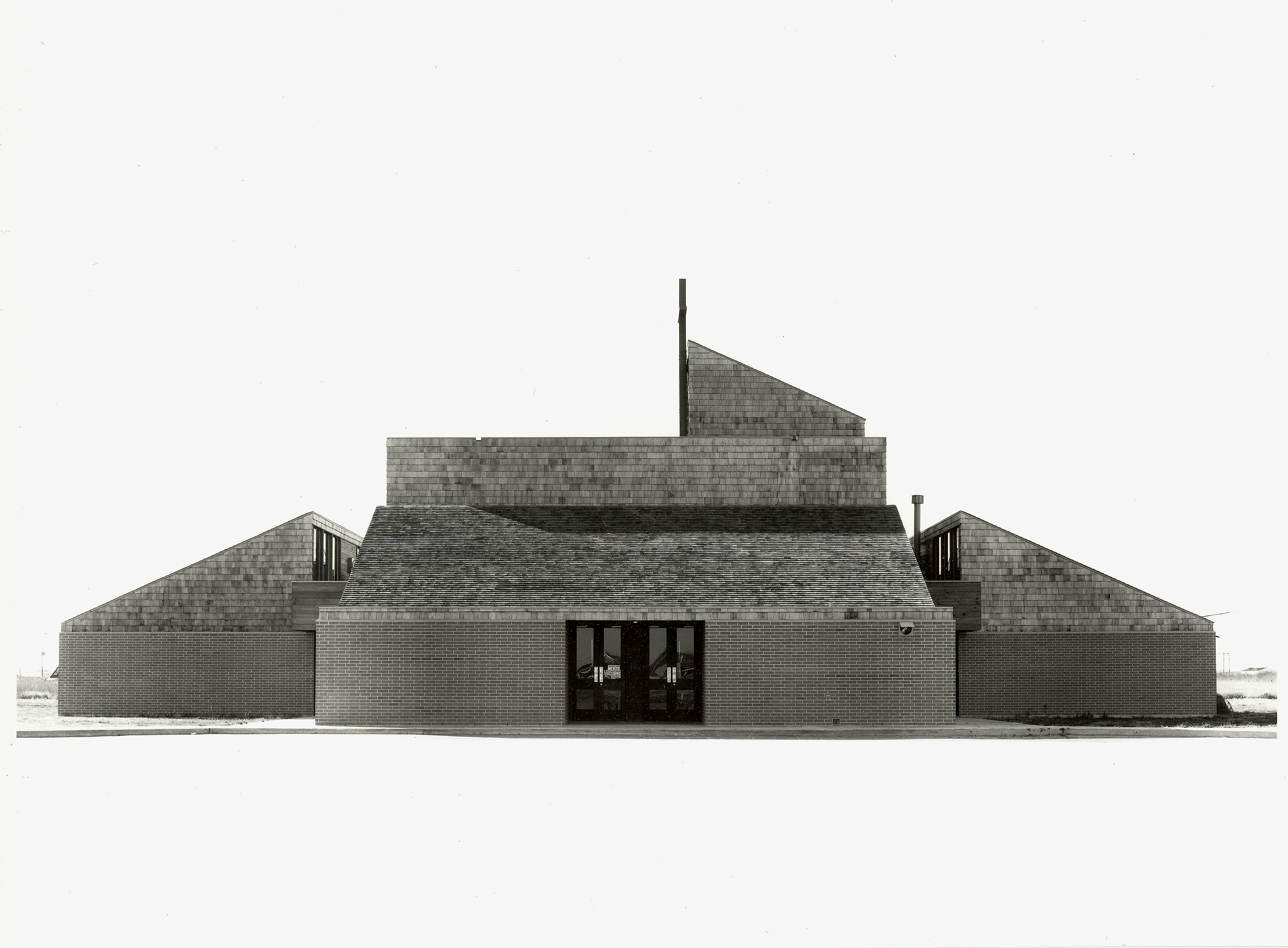
St. Barnabas Church

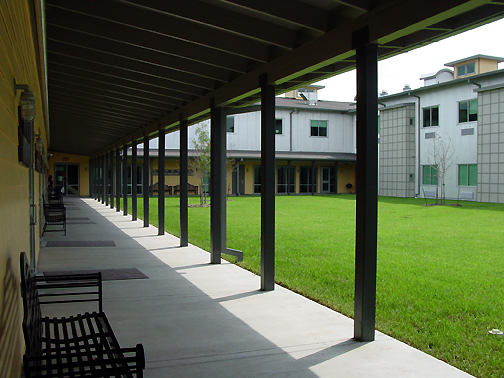
Houston Area Women's Center
