= Seattle Medium =

African-American newspaper

- Type: Weekly newspaper
- Owner: Tiloben Publishing Company
- Launched: 1970; 56 years ago
- City: Seattle
- Country: United States
- Circulation: 13,500 (as of 2022)
- ISSN: 0746-5394
- OCLC number: 10124671
- Website: seattlemedium.com

The Seattle Medium is an African-American newspaper that serves Seattle, Washington. It was founded in January 1970, and bore the name The Medium from 1970 to 1983.

== History ==
=== Founding ===
Seattle's first successful Black-owned newspaper was The Seattle Republican, founded in 1896. In the 1960s, a wave of Black-owned newspapers started in Seattle, including the Afro American Journal and The Facts.

Chris Bennett started the Seattle Medium in 1970, recalling later that he wanted to create a voice for the African American community during the racial unrest of the time. He had worked in journalism for slightly over a year and learned management and publishing skills as he began the paper. Cora Vaughn, who was studying journalism at the University of Washington at the time, helped found the Seattle Medium as its first editor. The newspaper began with four pages but expanded to eight soon after its launch.

Priscilla Hailey, Larry Williams, and Connie Cameron soon moved to Seattle to help with the Seattle Medium. Cameron, Bennett's sister, had a degree in broadcast journalism and became editor and publisher of the Seattle Medium.

=== Growth ===
In its early days, the paper employed as many as 50 staff. Omari Salisbury, of Converge Media, credited local Black newspapers of the time, including the Seattle Medium and The Facts, as "the go-to news sources for Seattle's Black Community," and thus "politicians, policy makers, community leaders and even celebrities knew they needed to make the Black media rounds."

When the Yesler-Atlantic Community Center opened in the Central District in 1972, it shared regular news releases with the Seattle Medium, among other local media sources, to encourage participation in its new classes. The KCTS 9 show Focus: Black Perspectives often featured stories from the Seattle Medium, and in turn, the paper shared similar public television shows which broadcast Black voices. As part of the Seattle Sonics' bid to attract popularity in spite of different racial demographics between the city and team, it provided free tickets to readers of the Seattle Medium for Black History Month. In 1980, the paper won an award from the National Newspaper Publishers Association, and Bennett was elected a member of the board.

In 1984, the Seattle Medium expanded into radio, buying stations in Seattle, Tacoma, and Portland. By 2003, it had become the largest Black-owned media company in the Pacific Northwest.

=== Recent years ===
By 2013 the Seattle Medium shrunk to 15 employees and 13,500 subscribers. In 2014 the paper completed a redesign, and remained committed to publishing in print as well as online. In 2016, the paper again won an award from the National Newspaper Publishers Association. In 2020, Black Lives Matter Seattle-King County donated funds to a variety of organizations, including Black-owned media outlets like the Seattle Medium, South Seattle Emerald, and KRIZ Renton.

In 2021, the Seattle Medium joined Word in Black, a coalition of Black newspapers from across the U.S. that would produce a shared news portal online. By then, there were less than 250 Black newspapers in the country, and many local Black newspapers had consolidated in the face of economic pressures. The collective started with ten newspapers ranging in geography and politics, and had 2,700 subscribers six months after launch.

The paper won three National Newspaper Publishers Association awards in 2021, including first place in the "Best Original Advertising" category.

== Location ==
The Seattle Medium's office is on Jackson Street in Seattle's Central District. King County Metro and the Black Heritage Society of Washington State featured the paper in its mural project, Routed in History: History Rides on Community Shoulders. One mural at a bus stop at Jackson Street and MLK Jr Way, near the Seattle Medium's office, covers the history of Black-owned local newspapers. The mural includes photos of The Seattle Republican, Seattle Medium, and The Facts, as well as Christopher H. Bennett and Chris B. Bennett.
