= The Advocate (Portland, Oregon) =

Defunct Black-owned newspaper in Portland, Oregon, USA

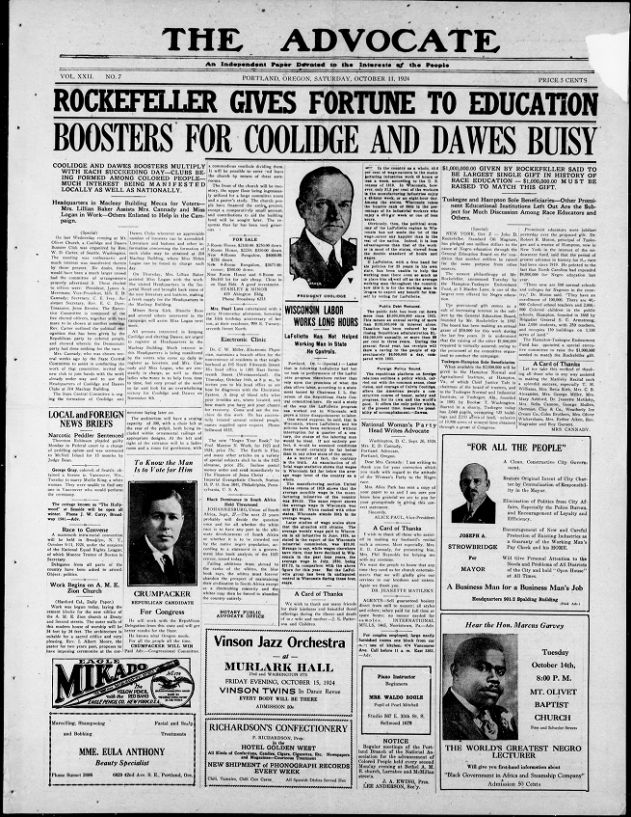
- The Advocate newspaper article, 1924
- Type: Weekly newspaper
- Founded: 1903
- Ceased publication: 1933
- Language: English
- Headquarters: Portland, Oregon, U.S.
- ISSN: 2996-6035
- OCLC number: 40119041

The Advocate was a four-page weekly newspaper in Portland, Oregon, established as a news source for Portland's African American community. It was founded in 1903 and was covered as an active entity in other Portland press until at least 1936. The Advocate was known as Portland's second oldest black newspaper. In 1933 when the paper ceased publication it was the only remaining black-owned newspaper. In its early days, it was known as the Mt. Scott Herald (published in Lents from 1913 to 1924) and possibly as the Beaver State Herald (published in Gresham and Montavilla). The Advocate covered a variety of topics for both the white and black communities in Portland. The Advocate covered segregation, lynching, employment opportunities and other issues at the beginning. Microfilm of the paper is available through 1933.

== Founders ==
The Advocate arose in connection with an effort to launch a black newspaper, headed by C. B. F. Moore, pastor of Zion A.M.E. church in Portland. The newspaper described its purpose in its first issue:

With this issue The Advocate makes its initial bow to the Portland public as an independent, non-partisan, non-sectarian weekly newspaper for the intelligent discussion and authentic diffusion of matter appertaining to the colored people, especially of Portland and the State of Oregon.

The founders consisted of J. A. Merriman, J. C. Logan, Rutherford, E. D. Cannady, Bob Perry, Howard Sproules, C. F. B. Moore, Edward Hunt, McCants Stewart, W. H. Bolds, and A. Ballard, most of whom worked for The Hotel Portland at the time.

Edward Rutherford claimed in a lawsuit to have loaned $10 to Moore in 1903, and that the money was never repaid. The 1906 lawsuit revealed several details of the inception of the Advocate. Cannady, who was at that time head waiter at the Hotel Portland, also invested $10, along with several others, in that early effort. By May 1904, Moore had renounced his editorial role, and in that month the staff of the paper reorganized; Cannady became managing editor at that time. That lawsuit ultimately absolved Cannady of any obligation to repay the debt.

Many of the founders dropped out of the newspaper project after the first couple of months due to demanding work load and already working multiple jobs. After a few years, E. D. Cannady was running the newspaper alone and regardless of working many hours at the hotel he made sure The Advocate came out every Friday.

Cannady and Sproull were sued for libel in 1907 by John Logan, who had served as a witness in the Rutherford case, and Cannady was the subject of separate libel accusations the following year.

In 1919, Merriman, then serving as editor of the competing Times, published an attack on Beatrice Cannady; The Advocate filed a civil suit, resulting in a "handsome" retraction by the Times and dismissal of the suit.

== Beatrice Morrow Cannady ==
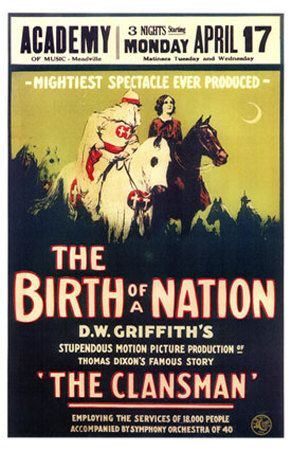
The Birth of a Nation, a racist movie Beatrice Morrow helped protest against.

Beatrice Morrow, Oregon's most prominent civil rights activist in the 20th century, moved to Portland and married The Advocate editor Edward Cannady in 1912. She became the assistant editor of The Advocate, a role she held for twenty-four years. In 1930, after their divorce, Beatrice became the editor and owner of the newspaper. At the time, Portland had an African American population of barely 1,000, and Beatrice Morrow Cannady quickly became involved in civil rights issues, including protesting the showing of The Birth of a Nation, a commercially successful silent film that portrayed the KKK as heroes. Through writing for The Advocate she was able to confront many racial issues that hotels, restaurants and movie theaters had. She routinely kept her readers up to date on Ku Klux Klan activity nearby in Portland and throughout the state. One of her biggest accomplishments was the challenging of excluding African American in many Pacific Northwest towns. The two main towns she focused on were Vernonia, Oregon, and Longview, Washington. Along with continuing to work on The Advocate and giving hundreds of talks and presentations, Cannady became the first African American to graduate from Northwestern College of Law in 1922, and she worked to remove racist language from the Oregon Constitution. She was finally successful in 1927. She continued her work in Oregon through the 1930s, when she moved to California. Cynthia Cannady, Beatrice's granddaughter, remembers her grandmother as a woman of many talents and a strong political conscience.

She was a tireless civil rights leader at a time when the Klan was active in Oregon and exclusion laws prohibited African-Americans from even residing in the state. She was a feminist at a time when women's suffrage was new and sexism was the norm. She was a believer in the equality of cultures and religions at a time when cultural arrogance and religious zealotry were common.

== About ==
Portland's African American community cited The Advocate as the city's most influential newspaper. The Advocate is known for creating conversation around interracial relations in Oregon and the rest of the country in the early 1900s. Printed weekly, the news paper featured birth and death announcements, hotel and society news, and general good news about the African American race. Articles and editorials about segregation, lynching, employment opportunities and other issues kept the realities of Jim Crow laws and the pressing need for civil rights on the local, state, and national agenda.

On the 22nd birthday of the newspaper, E. D. Cannady awarded "the lion's share of credit" to Beatrice for "her intrepid courage, faith in the loyalty of the people she serves and her self-confidence."

In 1936, The Advocate worked with the Portland Art Museum to exhibit the New York–based Harmon Foundation's collection of paintings, watercolors, and sculptures by black artists.

== Original issues ==
In February 2019, original issues of The Advocate, among other newspapers, were anonymously donated to the University of Oregon Library. Issues of The Advocate dating from October 1924 to December 1933 were made available in the library's Historic Oregon Newspaper online resource.

== Other newspapers with the same name ==
In May 1981, the Portland Black United Front started a monthly newspaper called The Portland Advocate. Its inaugural issue contained a map showing killings of black people in Portland. It ran through at least November 1981.

In the 1870s, there was a paper called the Portland Pacific Christian Advocate.

== See also ==
- Portland New Age
