= Oregon Mirror =

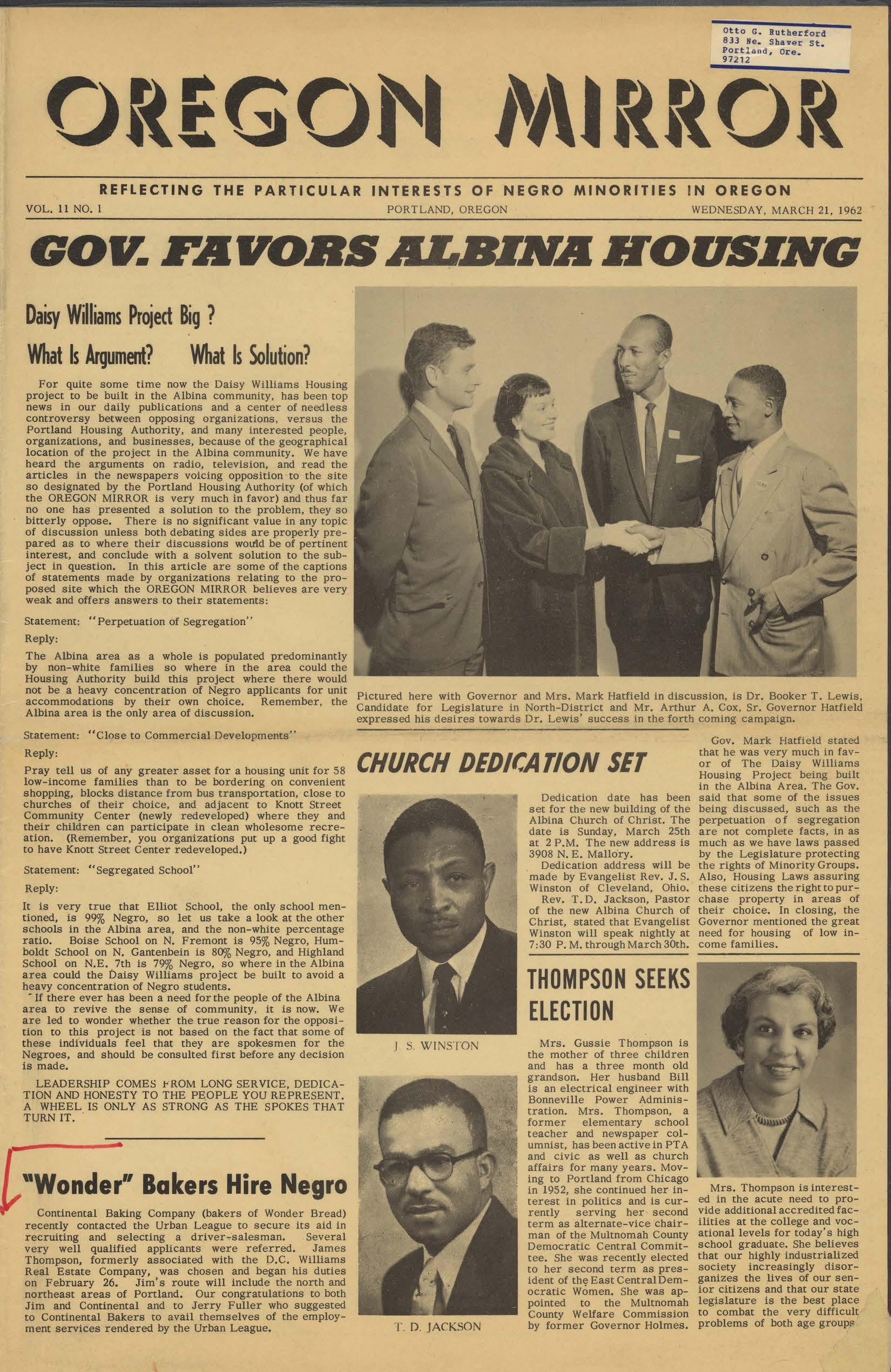
- Cover of the March 21, 1962 issue
- Founder(s): Jimmy "Bang Bang" Walker; Don Alford
- Founded: 1961
- Language: English
- City: Portland, Oregon
- ISSN: 2997-3783
- OCLC number: 41109937

The Oregon Mirror was an African-American newspaper that was founded by Jimmy "Bang Bang" Walker and Don Alford in 1961. Along with the Northwest Defender, it was identified as one of the two Black newspapers of "Albinatown" in the early 1960s.

Walker was a dynamic figure in the Portland society, described in an Oregonian article as "...former boxer, barber, longshoreman, newspaper publisher, editor and reporter, entrepreneur, deejay, legislative candidate, Santa Claus, promoter and advocate of civil rights." He was profiled in the Oregonian in 1999.

== Archives ==
- File:Oregon Mirror March 21, 1962.pdf
- File:Oregon Mirror April 25, 1962.pdf
