= The Facts (Seattle) =

African American newspaper in Washington

Coordinates: 47.612°N 122.289°W

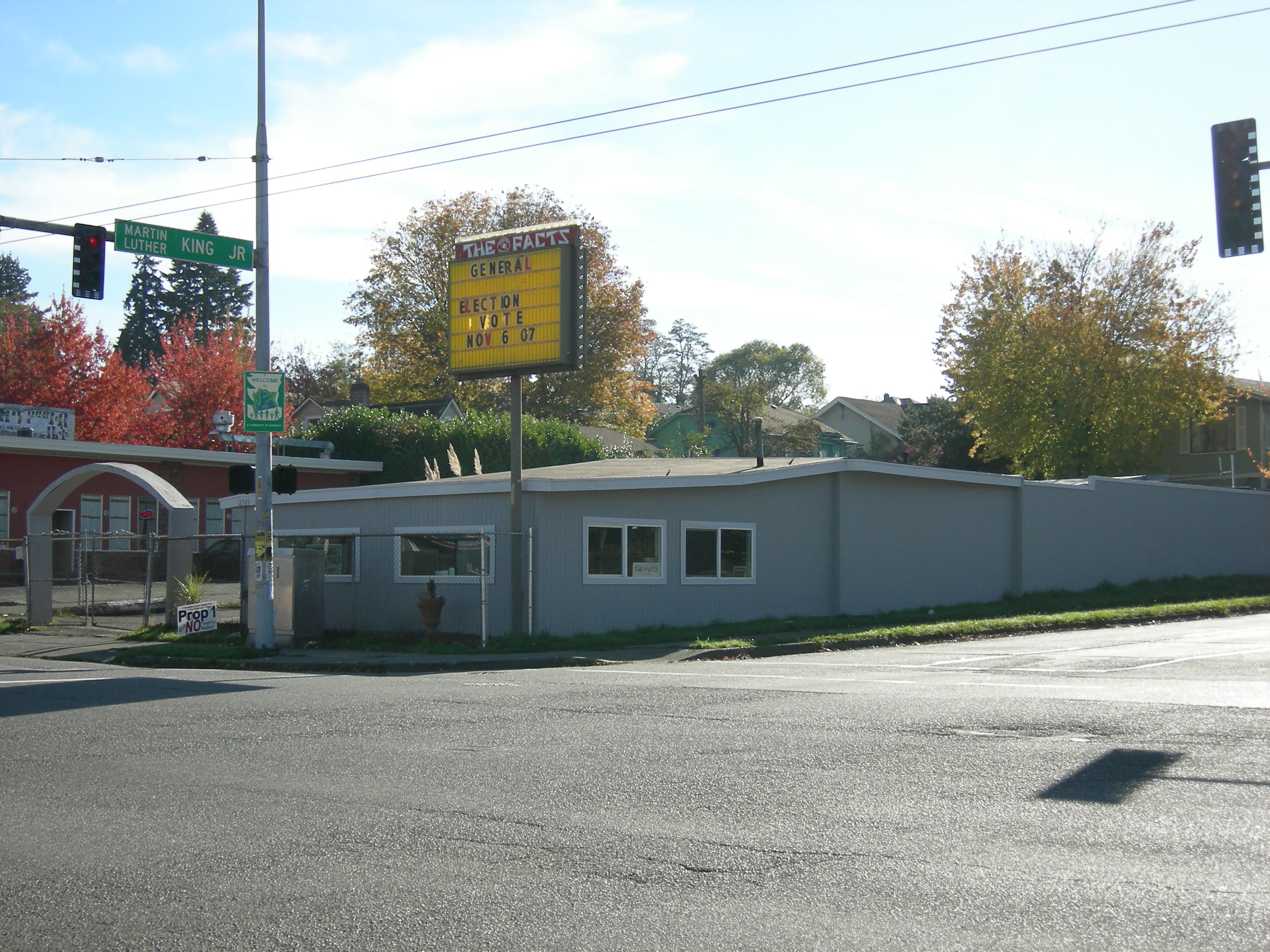
- Headquarters of The Facts Newspaper
- Type: Weekly newspaper
- Founder: Fitzgerald Redd Beaver
- Launched: September 7, 1961; 65 years ago
- Headquarters: 1112 34th Avenue
- City: Seattle
- Country: United States
- Circulation: 50,000 (as of 2022)
- ISSN: 0427-8879
- Website: Official website

The Facts, also known as Seattle Facts, is an African-American weekly newspaper that serves Seattle, Washington. Headquartered in the Central District, it was founded September 7, 1961 by Fitzgerald Redd Beaver. Printed by Pacific Media Inc. His children, Marla, LaVonne Beaver are currently the publishers and editors. Leaving Mrs.Elizabeth Beaver as the current leader after Beaver's death in 1992 The Facts is a member of the West Coast Black Publishers Association and bills itself as the "Voice of the Black Community."

== Background ==
"The Facts" was the first African-American oriented newspaper in Seattle and is now only one of three African-American oriented newspapers in the area. The newspaper distributes around 80,000 copies currently in Seattle and surrounding area, the paper earns about $500,000 a year. The Facts started with a 5,000 newspapers in circulation. The Newspaper is published every Wednesday. The Puget Sound region's black newspapers are bucking a national trend of fast-slipping circulation. "The Facts" founder Fitz Redd Beaver originally started the paper because he was looking for a source of income after losing his previous job. The main emphasis of "The Facts" is to primarily develop a perspective that can be interpreted by a mass audience. Fitz Redd Beaver examined the possibility of making a difference in his particular community to identify how data and information can be delivered. This viewpoint allowed an audience to develop an inherent eye on how information in the North West, specifically Seattle could be identified. The goal of The Facts was to pick up stories that are oriented towards the African-American population in Seattle. The Facts also hired many black journalists who later left the paper to create other newspapers such as The Medium, The Skanner and more in and around the northwest region.

== Competition ==
There are currently two African-American oriented newspapers in the Seattle area: The Seattle Medium and The Facts. The Skanner, a longtime paper in this space, ceased operations in 2026. . There is much debate if the African-American population in Seattle is large enough to support three newspapers. Fitzgerald Redd Beaver the founder of "The Facts" assisted his biggest competitors Chris Bennett and Ernie Foster in opening their own African American oriented newspapers. Redd Beaver later distinguished his paper from his competitors by adding a distinctive pink color to his newspaper. Given the African-American population is 52,000. The Facts is free, and gets its main revenue from ads. The Seattle Medium is relatively low in cost at 25 cents a paper.

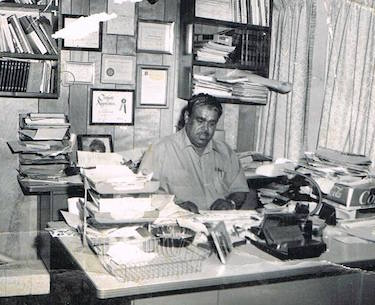
The founder of "The Facts" newspaper: Fitzgerald Beaver.

== Founder ==
Fitzgerald Redd Beaver (1922-1992) was born January 18, 1922, in Martinsville, Virginia. Beaver graduated from high school in his home town of Martinsville, Virginia. He then went on to enroll and attend at North Carolina A&T College, but dropped out before graduating. Fitz had several jobs before coming to the Northwest including: a civilian employee for the U.S. Army, a railroad porter, and working at a radio station. His career at the radio station sparked his passion, spending the rest of his life in public relations and journalism. Quite successful in his career on the radio he became known as "Eager Beaver" on his radio show. Taking this fame he moved to manage a black owned radio station in the Northwest. Staying a short while, then founded "The Facts". Fitz continued to better his community throughout his life as the president of the Boys and Girls Club, creating a primarily African American golf club, and worked with the government on minority recruitings.
