= The Skanner =

Newspaper in Portland, Oregon

The Skanner News
- Type: Weekly newspaper
- Founder(s): Bernard V. Foster, Bobbie Dore Foster
- Publisher: Bernard V. Foster
- Editor: Bobbie Dore Foster
- Founded: October 1975
- Ceased publication: January 2026
- Language: English
- Headquarters: Portland, Oregon
- Circulation: 75,000 (peak)
- ISSN: 1543-6357
- OCLC number: 12566075
- Website: Official website
- Free online archives: University of Oregon Libraries

The Skanner or The Skanner News was an African-American newspaper covering the Pacific Northwest of the United States. Its head office was in Portland, Oregon and it formerly had an office in Seattle, Washington. Founded in 1975, its circulation peaked in the 1990s. It discontinued its regular print publication in 2020, shifting to an online-only format before ceasing operations in 2026. The major state newspaper, The Oregonian, has published items from The Skanner on its website OregonLive.com.

== History ==
Bernard "Bernie" Foster and his wife Bobbie Dore Foster started the paper in 1975. Bernard Foster had worked at The Facts in Seattle while studying at the University of Washington; while attending a Portland Trail Blazers game, he and some friends realized that Portland did not have a newspaper aimed at African-American readers. Inspired by the teachings of Martin Luther King Jr., he and his wife moved to Portland and founded The Skanner. Bernard Foster became part-owner of the Northwest Dispatch in Tacoma, Washington in 1985. A Seattle edition known as the Seattle Skanner was first published in 1981 before being merged back into the Portland edition; at least one attempt was made to relaunch it in 1990, but it was ultimately combined back into a single publication.

Bernie Foster served as secretary of the West Coast Black Publishers Association as early as 1983. In 1992, Foster, then president of the organization, announced a deal with Nordstrom to spend $220,000 on advertising in 20 Black papers in the west.

In 1989, The Skanner began campaigning for the renaming of Portland's Union Avenue to Martin Luther King Boulevard. The campaign was successful. In 1990, a fire destroyed a warehouse owned by The Skanner, causing $28,000 in damages. The cause was determined as arson.

Circulation of The Skanner peaked in the 1990s at around 75,000 print editions. The paper was also one of the first local outlets to create a website.

In 1997, the newspaper's headquarters were moved to a former funeral home at 415 N Killingsworth St. in the Humboldt neighborhood of North Portland. The building is now known as the "Skanner Building". In 2009, the owners installed security cameras to monitor an adjacent hot spot of drug deals and shootings, and made sure loiterers knew they were being watched. When crime went down by 50 percent, cops credited the decline in part to the paper's vigilance.

Starting in 2012, The Skanner displayed a solar meter to chart the energy it was harnessing from the extensive banks of solar cells the owners had installed on the roof and awning of their headquarters building.

In early 2020, the media organization stopped publishing regular print editions, but continued to publish online. In 2023, the newspaper sold its office building and all of its contents, noting that their employees were able to work remotely. In January 2026, The Skanner ceased operations entirely, with the final digital edition dated January 7, 2026. The Fosters were still involved in the business, and Bobbie Foster cited the shift of advertising dollars to social media platforms as the reason for the closure. The Oregon Historical Society has copies of most of The Skanner's print editions and a free-to-use collection of photographs from the paper.

== Legacy ==
Following the paper's closure in 2026, a retail store at the Portland International Airport was named "The Skanner News" in the paper's honor.
