= Beatrice Morrow Cannady =

American activist (1890–1974)

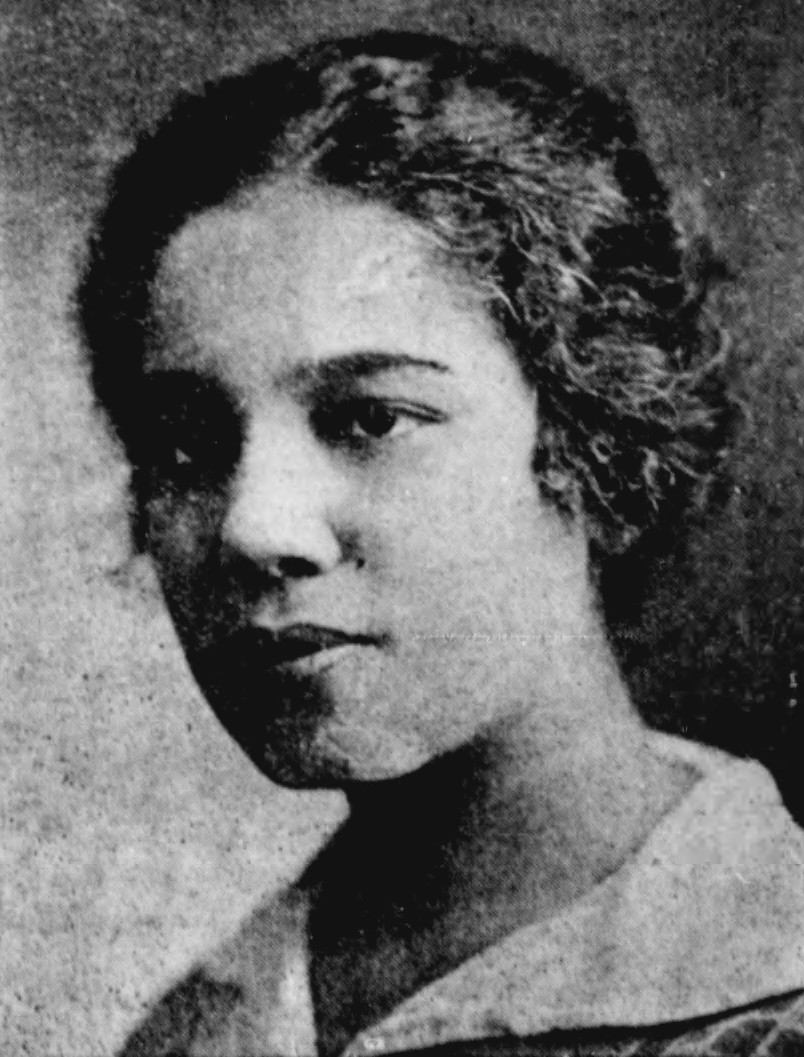
- Born: Beatrice Hulon Morrow; January 9, 1890; Littig, Texas, United States
- Died: August 19, 1974 (aged 84); Los Angeles, California, United States
- Education: Northwestern College of Law
- Occupations: Publisher, civil rights activist
- Spouse: Edward Daniel Cannady

Beatrice Morrow Cannady (January 9, 1890 – August 19, 1974) born Beatrice Hulon Morrow, was a renowned civil rights advocate in early 20th-century Oregon, United States. She was editor of the Advocate, the state's largest African-American newspaper. She also co-founded the Portland, Oregon chapter of the NAACP in 1913, where she served as vice-president.

== Early life ==
Cannady was born Beatrice Hulon Morrow in Littig, Texas in 1890. She was the second-oldest daughter of George Morrow and Mary Francis Carter Morrow, farmers who raised their children to value education. They had twelve surviving children; eleven daughters and one son. Morrow enjoyed singing from an early age. Beatrice graduated from Wiley College. As a young woman, she moved to Chicago to study music with conductor David Clippinger.

== Career and civil rights ==
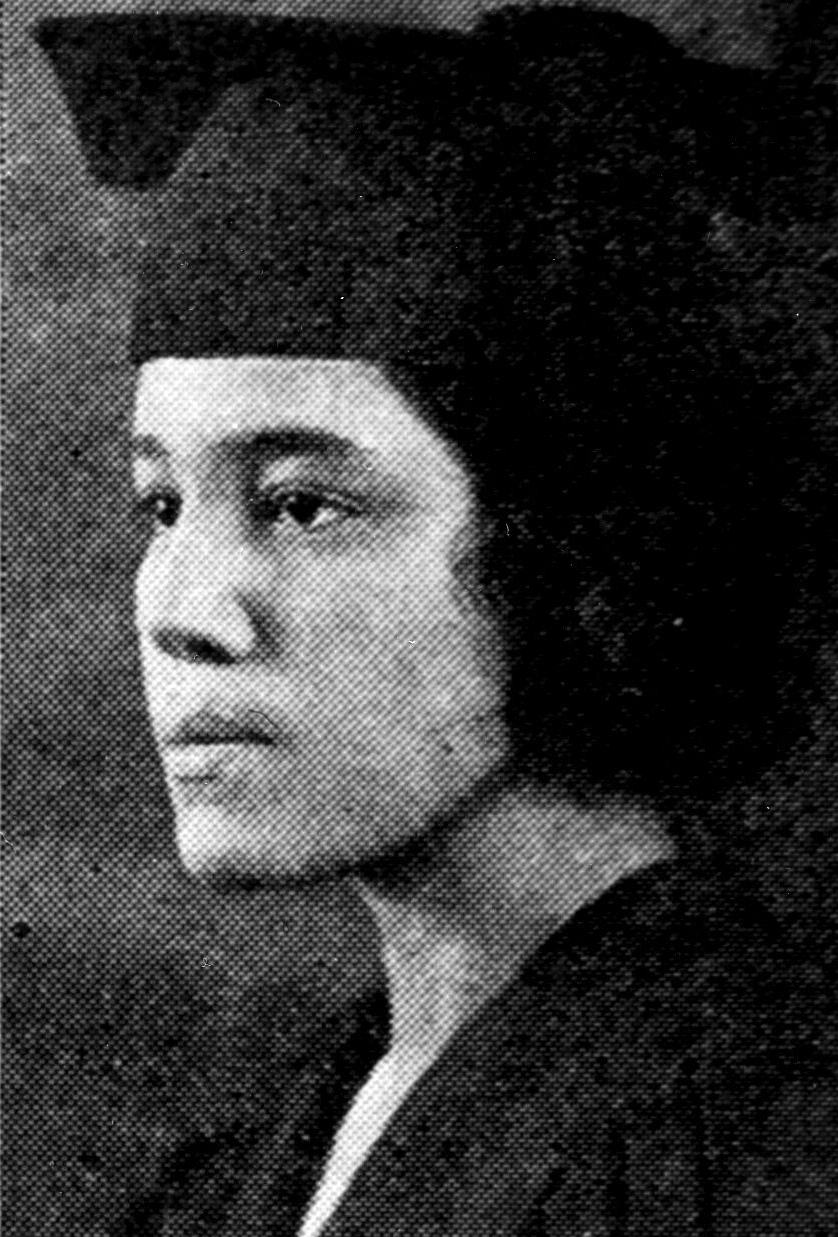
Cannady during her graduation in 1922

In June 1912, Beatrice Morrow married Edward Daniel Cannady. He was the co-founder of The Advocate, one of Portland, Oregon's first black-owned newspapers. The two had written to each other while Morrow was living in Chicago. Upon moving to Portland, Cannady became associate editor of The Advocate. Her work through the newspaper drew attention to racial violence during the early 1920s and prompted a statement from Governor Ben W. Olcott decrying the actions of the Ku Klux Klan, which was spreading through Oregon at the time.

In addition to her editorial work, Cannady helped to establish the Portland chapter of the NAACP in 1913. This organization marked the first such branch of the organization formed west of the Mississippi River and continues to actively participate in the Portland community. Acting as the chapter's secretary, Cannady worked with the group to remove racist, exclusionary language from Oregon's constitution, a mission which succeeded in 1926 and 1927 when the changes were ratified. Cannady also led protests against Ku Klux Klan propaganda film The Birth of a Nation.

Cannady also worked towards reforms in prisons and the justice system as well as speaking out against war and militarism.

Cannady's involvement with the Bahá'í Faith can be dated to 1914/1915, though the Mangun biography dates her official affiliation to 1928, apparently the earliest available membership list of the Portland community.

Cannady graduated from Northwestern College of Law, now known as Lewis and Clark Law School, in 1922, making her the first black woman to graduate from law school in Oregon. She went on to become the first black woman to practice law in Oregon. A Republican, she was the first black woman to run for state representative. Cannady successfully advocated for the passage of civil rights bills by the Oregon state legislature. Her efforts helped integrate public schools in Longview, Washington and Vernonia, Oregon.

=== Nationwide trip ===
In 1927, Cannady represented Oregon at the 4th annual Pan-African Congress in New York City, a major trip, for which she wrote a series of 9 columns of her trip to the east and her visits along the way as well as the conference itself:

- She begins with visits and receptions before she left, then going north by train and boat, visiting in Seattle and Vancouver, across the Canadian Rockies, and then stopping in Minneapolis, Minnesota, before arriving in Chicago.
- She stayed a few days in Chicago with some receptions, mentioning previous stays and friends in the city, visiting the Chicago Bee, and The Chicago Defender, meeting its publisher, Robert Abbott, and other establishments, before leaving for Detroit. The Defender offered its own article on her visit.
- She arrived unannounced in Detroit, but connected with friends and then to others for receptions, visiting the National Medical Association conference just starting, and a chance to interview Ossian Sweet, who told of the violence against his home, before setting off to the environs of the Niagara Falls.
- She arrived in the early morning to see the Falls, before going into Buffalo to visit American activist Mary B. Talbert and family, and various institutions and monuments, before going to Portsmouth, NH, where she was greeted by Louis G. Gregory and others coming from Green Acre Bahá'í School.
- There was a peace conference going on at the school upon arrival, where she spoke on the Pan-African Congress, and was asked to extend her comments in a second talk, which inspired some like Sadie and Mabry Oglesby to go to the congress. At the school, she also had a chance to visit with Mrs. Gregory (the Gregorys were an inter-racial marriage), Horace Holley, May Maxwell and her daughter, before heading to Boston. There was extended coverage of the peace conference in the previous week's Advocate not under any by-line, as well as recommendation of its magazine, an issue of which arrived at the offices of the newspaper.
- She picks up her series arriving in New York August 21, where she was greeted by peace advocates and others, was urgent to see Harlem, and was there to hear the formal greetings at the Pan-African Congress on its first events. The next day started with a talk by Coralie Franklin Cook, followed by many others including Dantès Bellegarde from Haiti. Her own message to the conference was read to the audience, as well as that of her Oregon Governor, Isaac Patterson; she saw an exhibit by the Schomburg Center, and there was a session given by educator Leslie Pinckney Hill, among many others. Coverage in The Advocate continued the next week. Coverage began with W. E. B. DuBois's talk followed by many others. She mentions that various journalists sought her out to interview because of her inter-racial "Tea" gatherings in Portland, and later comments on visiting a mixed-race audience at a Black cabaret.
- She picks up in a third part of just the conference in the next edition of The Advocate. She visited many places again, including Greenwich Village, the offices of The Crisis, with more receptions and opportunities.
- The next part of her series was published the second week of November. She devotes almost the whole 9th column with meeting up with Roy Wilhelm, again, from two years previous in San Francisco, and going to his log cabin, itself working as a retreat for another Bahá'í meeting, this time hosting one on "Race Amity", at which she spoke, which she presents as quoted through another newspaper. Another local paper also noted it, though misspelling her name. She intended a 10th part of the series but was too busy with a Portland-hosted local "Pan-African" conference.

== Personal life ==
Beatrice Morrow Cannady married Edward Cannady in Portland, Oregon in June 1912. The couple had two sons, George Cannady and Ivan Caldwell Cannady. They divorced in 1930 after 18 years of marriage. A year later, Mrs. Cannady married Jerome Yancy Franklin, a typist at The Advocate.

Cannady and Franklin left Oregon in about 1938 for Los Angeles, California. They divorced about 1942. Cannady married Reuben Taylor on December 17, 1946. Cannady worked for the Precinct Reporter, a Southern California newspaper founded in 1965 that served the black community. Mr. Taylor died in June 1972.

== Legacy ==
Cannady paved the way for the second generation of civil rights activists in Oregon with her nearly 25-year fight as a leading activist. To honor her history in the area, a new school in the North Clackamas School District bears her name as the Beatrice Morrow Cannady Elementary School. An affordable housing project in North Portland is named the Beatrice Morrow Building in her honor.

== See also ==
- List of first women lawyers and judges in Oregon
