= Adolphus D. Griffin =

American newspaper editor and publisher

- Born: June 11, 1868; Kingston, Louisiana, US
- Died: June 2, 1916 (aged 47); Kansas City, Kansas, US
- Occupations: Newspaper editor and publisher
- Years active: 1888–1916
- Known for: The New Age (Portland, Oregon)

Adolphus Dyonisius Griffin (June 11, 1868 – June 2, 1916) was an American newspaper editor and publisher in the Pacific Northwest, Los Angeles, and Kansas who focused on African-American causes, including disenfranchisement in business and politics. Also known as A. D. Griffin, he founded The New Age, Portland's first Black newspaper, in 1896. He was friends with Booker T. Washington and participated in the Portland chapter of the National Afro-American Council. He was also an investor in real estate.

== Life ==
Griffin was born June 11, 1868, in Kingston, Louisiana. His parents, Fannie and Tillman Griffin, were farmers. At age 20, he moved to California.

Griffin was married to Emma K. Griffin, whom he left in 1907 when he moved to Topeka, Kansas.

He later moved to Kansas City, where he died of heart failure in his office on June 2, 1916. He was buried in Shreveport, Louisiana.

== Career ==
July 14, 1900 call for submissions to The New Age

If you are sick,
If you are going to have a tour,
If you have a friend coming to town,
If you are going to give a reception,
If you did give a reception lately,
If you have lost a member of your family,
If your church is going to give a concert or supper,
If you have any good clean news, whatever, send it by card or otherwise.

– Adolphus D. Griffin, The New Age,

While he lived in California, Griffin helped with starting the California Eagle (Los Angeles). When he moved to Spokane, Washington, he became an editor for The Northwest Echo. He moved to Portland, Oregon in 1896, where he started The New Age, (Note: Renamed the Portland New Age in 1905.) an eight-page weekly newspaper he published from 1899 to 1907. This was the first newspaper for Portland's roughly 700 black residents. He also started land development company Enterprise Investment Company. In addition to its historical importance for articles on issues facing the black population, The New Age is unique since African-Americans were excluded by the constitution of the state of Oregon during the time the newspaper was published.

He was elected as a Republican delegate to the Oregon state convention twice.

In Topeka, Kansas, he worked as an editor for The Topeka Plaindealer and as a city detective. In 1913, Griffin became a trustee and board president for Western University, a historically black college in Quindaro, Kansas. In 1916 in Kansas City, he started The Kansas Elevator.
