= Portland New Age =

First Black-owned newspaper in Oregon

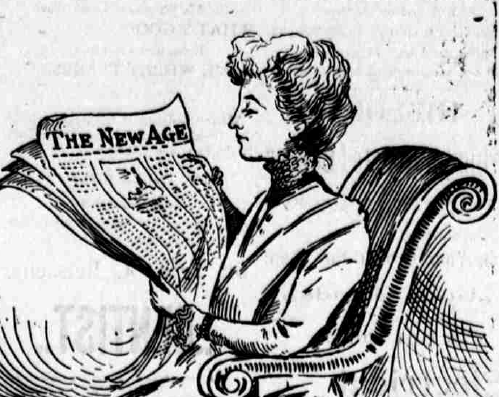
- Type: African American newspaper
- Publisher: Adolphus D. Griffin
- Founded: 1896; 130 years ago
- City: Oregon
- Country: United States

The New Age, later known as the Portland New Age, was the first African American newspaper published in Oregon.

== History ==
Adolphus D. Griffin, or A.D. Griffin, launched the weekly newspaper in 1896. Griffin, served various occupational roles throughout his life, which included editor, publisher, politician, entrepreneur, and even custodian. He was known as a "political leader of the colored people of the Willamette Valley,"

Shortly after the New Age's initial launch, Griffin offered to circulate it to Portland's black residents for free. The city's black population, which numbered fewer than 800 on the paper's launch date, were highly literate in comparison to southern blacks of the time, and to Oregon's white laboring class. At the time, black people were legally prohibited from living in the state by a provision in the Oregon Constitution. The New Age, which included national news items in addition to local coverage, was intended for a black readership. However, the publication likely attracted some white audiences, as well.

Griffin was a member of the Oregon Press Association.

Prior to launching the New Age, Griffin had been editor of the Northwest Echo in Spokane, Washington. He left Portland for unknown reasons in 1907, and the newspaper did not survive his departure. He died nine years later; at the time he was editor of the Kansas Elevator.

The Oregon Historical Society holds about 400 issues of the New Age, and the University of Oregon and Harvard University have issues on microfilm.

== See also ==
- The Advocate (Portland, Oregon)
