= List of African American newspapers and media outlets =

This is a list of African American newspapers and media outlets, which is sortable by publication name, city, state, founding date, and extant vs. defunct status. For more detail on a given newspaper, see the linked entries below. See also by state, below on this page, for entries on African American newspapers in each state.

== Print ==
African-American newspapers
Name	City	State	Founded	Closed
93d Blue Helmet	Fort Huachuca	Arizona	1942–1943	Defunct
AC Phoenix News, The	Winston-Salem	North Carolina	1983	Extant
Advance, The	Wilmington	Delaware	1899–19?	Defunct
Advocate	Charleston	West Virginia	?	Defunct
Advocate, The	Portland	Oregon	1903–1933	Defunct
African Expositor	Raleigh	North Carolina	18??–18?	Defunct
African-American News and Issues	Houston	Texas	1996	Extant
Africo-American Presbyterian	Wilmington	North Carolina	1879–1938	Defunct
Afro-American Citizen, The	Charleston	South Carolina	1899–1902	Defunct
Afro-American Courier	Yazoo City	Mississippi	1926–19?	Defunct
Daily Record	Wilmington	North Carolina	1895–1898	Defunct
Aliened American, The	Cleveland	Ohio	1852–1856	Defunct
American Record	Plattsmouth	Nebraska	1945	Extant
Anti-Slavery Bugle, The	New Lisbon	Ohio	1845–1861	Defunct
The Apache Sentinel	Fort Huachuca	Arizona	1943-1945	Defunct
Appeal, The	Saint Paul	Minnesota	1889–19?	Defunct
Arizona Black Dispatch	Phoenix	Arizona	1976-197?	Defunct
Arizona Gleam, The	Phoenix	Arizona	1929–193?	Defunct
Arizona Sun	Phoenix	Arizona	1942–196?	Defunct
Arizona Tribune	Phoenix	Arizona	1958–197?	Defunct
Arizona's Negro Journal	Phoenix	Arizona	1942-1943	Defunct
Atlanta Daily World	Atlanta	Georgia	1928	Extant
Baltimore Afro-American	Baltimore	Maryland	1892	Extant
Banner-Enterprise, The	Wilmington	North Carolina	1883–18?	Defunct
Bay State Banner	Boston	Massachusetts	1965	Extant
Beacon Journal (later Beacon Digest and West Virginia Beacon Digest)	Charleston	West Virginia	1957–	Defunct
Bee, The	Washington	D.C.	1882–1884	Defunct
Birmingham Times	Birmingham	Alabama	?	Extant
Black Chronicle	Oklahoma City	Oklahoma	1979	Extant
Black Panther, The	Oakland	California	1967–1980	Defunct
Black Times: Voices of the National Community	Palo Alto	California	1971–1976?	Defunct
Boston Guardian	Boston	Massachusetts	1901–1950s	Defunct
Breeze	Huntington	West Virginia	?	Defunct
Broad Ax, The	Salt Lake City	Utah	1895–19?	Defunct
Buffalo, The	Fort Huachuca	Arizona	1942–1945	Defunct
Burning Spear, The	Oakland	California	1968	Extant
Bystander, The	Des Moines	Iowa	1916–1922	Defunct
The Cactus Tribune	Tucson	Arizona	1946-19??	Defunct
California Eagle	Los Angeles	California	1879–1964	Defunct
Call, The	Kansas City	Missouri	1919	Extant
Call and Post	Cleveland	Ohio	1928	Extant
Carolina Panorama, The	Columbia	South Carolina	1986	Extant
Carolina Times, The	Durham	North Carolina	1921–2020	Defunct
Cayton's Monthly	Seattle	Washington	1921–1921	Defunct
Cayton's Weekly	Seattle	Washington	1916–1921	Defunct
Century Voice, The	Yazoo City	Mississippi	194?–19?	Defunct
Charleston Advocate, The	Charleston	South Carolina	1867–1868	Defunct
Charleston Chronicle, The	Charleston	South Carolina	1971	Extant
Charlotte Post, The	Charlotte	North Carolina	1878	Extant
Chattanooga Observer, The	Chattanooga	Tennessee	1927–1962	Defunct
Chicago Defender	Chicago	Illinois	1905	Extant
Chicago Whip, The	Chicago	Illinois	1919–19?	Defunct
Chicago World	Chicago	Illinois	1918–19?	Defunct
Christian Banner	Philadelphia	Pennsylvania		Defunct
Christian Recorder, The	Pittsburgh	Pennsylvania	1854	Extant
Cincinnati Herald, The	Cincinnati	Ohio	1955	Extant
Cleveland Gazette, The	Cleveland	Ohio	1883–1945	Defunct
Colored American, The	New York City	New York	1837–1842	Defunct
Colored American, The	Washington	D.C.	1893–1904	Defunct
Colored Citizen, The	Helena	Montana	1894–1894	Defunct
Columbus Times, The	Columbus	Georgia	1921	Extant
Community Citizen, The	New Albany	Mississippi	19??–19?	Defunct
Concordia Eagle, The	Vidalia	Louisiana	1873–1890	Defunct
Connecticut Chronicle	Hartford	Connecticut	194?–194?	Defunct
Crisis, The	Baltimore	Maryland	1910	Extant
Afro-American Sentinel	Omaha	Nebraska	1892	Extant
Daily Express, The	Dayton	Ohio	1950–1955	Defunct
Daily National Era	Washington	D.C.	1854–1854	Defunct
Dallas Express	Dallas	Texas	1892–1970	Defunct
Dayton Forum, The	Dayton	Ohio	1913–1949	Defunct
Daytona Times, The	Daytona Beach	Florida	1978	Extant
Delta Leader, The	Greenville	Mississippi	1939–19?	Defunct
Denver Star, The	Denver	Colorado	1913–1963	Defunct
Detroit Tribune	Detroit	Michigan	1933–1933	Defunct
Detroit Tribune, The	Detroit	Michigan	1935–1966	Defunct
Ebony	Los Angeles	California	1945	Extant
Echo, The	Meridian	Mississippi	1942–1960	Defunct
Essence	New York	New York	1970	Extant
Facts, The	Seattle	Washington	1961	Extant
The Progress	Omaha	Nebraska	1889	Extant
Final Call, The	Chicago	Illinois	1979	Extant
Florida Sentinel Bulletin	Tampa	Florida	1919	Extant
Florida Star, The	Jacksonville	Florida	1951	Extant
Forum, The	Springfield	Illinois	1904–192?	Defunct
Franklin's Paper the Denver Star	Denver	Colorado	1912–1913	Defunct
Franklin's Paper the Statesman	Denver	Colorado	1906–1912	Defunct
Free Citizen, The	Orangeburg	South Carolina	1874–1876	Defunct
Free Press, The	Charleston	South Carolina	1868–186?	Defunct
Freedom	New York City	New York	1950–1955	Defunct
Freedom's Journal	New York City	New York	1827–1829	Defunct
Frost Illustrated	Fort Wayne	Indiana	1968	Defunct
Future Outlook, The	Greensboro	North Carolina	1941–1972	Defunct
Gary Crusader	Gary	Indiana	1961	Extant
Gazette, The	Raleigh	North Carolina	18??–1???	Defunct
Georgetown Planet, The	Georgetown	South Carolina	1873–1875	Defunct
Golden Rule, The	Vicksburg	Mississippi	1898–19?	Defunct
Gossip Depot free online news	Memphis	Tennessee	2020	Extant
Harambee News	Los Angeles	California	1966–1969	Defunct
Hartford Chronicle	Hartford	Connecticut	194?–1947	Defunct
Hartford-Springfield Chronicle	Springfield	Massachusetts	1940–194?	Defunct
Houston Forward Times	Houston	Texas	1960	Extant
Huntington Enterprise	Huntington	West Virginia	?	Defunct
Huntington Times	Huntington	West Virginia	?	Defunct
Illinois Times, The	Champaign	Illinois	19??–19?	Defunct
Indianapolis Freeman	Indianapolis	Indiana	1888–1926	Defunct
Indianapolis Leader	Indianapolis	Indiana	1879–1891	Defunct
Indianapolis Recorder	Indianapolis	Indiana	1895	Extant
Ink	Fort Wayne	Indiana	2001–?	Defunct
Iowa State Bystander	Des Moines	Iowa	1894–1916	Defunct
Jackson Advocate	Jackson	Mississippi	1938	Extant
Jet	Los Angeles	California	1951	Extant
St. Louis Palladium	St. Louis	Missouri	1884?–1911?	Defunct
Journal of Industry, The	Raleigh	North Carolina	1879–1???	Defunct
Kansas City Sun, The	Kansas City	Missouri	1908–1924	Defunct
Tribune de la Nouvelle-Orléans or New Orleans Tribune	New Orleans	Louisiana	1864–1870	Defunct
Langston City Herald, The	Langston City	Oklahoma	1891–1902	Defunct
Lexington Standard, The	Lexington	Kentucky	1892–1912	Defunct
Liberator, The	Boston	Massachusetts	1831–1865	Defunct
Los Angeles Sentinel	Los Angeles	California	1933	Extant
Louisiana Weekly, The	New Orleans	Louisiana	1925	Extant
Louisianian, The	New Orleans	Louisiana	1870–1871	Defunct
Louisville Defender	Louisville	Kentucky	1933	Extant
Maryville Republican	Maryville	Tennessee	1867–187?	Defunct
McDowell Herald	Keystone	West Virginia	?	Defunct
McDowell Times, The	Keystone	West Virginia	1904–1941	Defunct
Metropolis Weekly Gazette	Metropolis	Illinois	1???–19?	Defunct
Metropolitan News	Chicago	Illinois	1935–19?	Defunct
Miami Times, The	Miami	Florida	1923	Extant
Michigan Chronicle	Detroit	Michigan	1936	Extant
Missionary Record	Charleston	South Carolina	1868–1879	Defunct
Mojo	New York City	New York	1968–?	Defunct
Monitor, The	Omaha	Nebraska	1915–1928	Defunct
Montana Plaindealer, The	Helena	Montana	1906–1911	Defunct
Muhammad Speaks	Chicago	Illinois	1962–1975	Defunct
Muskogee Cimeter, The	Muskogee	Oklahoma	1901–19?	Defunct
Muslim Journal	Chicago	Illinois	1962	Extant
Nashville Globe	Nashville	Tennessee	1906–1960	Defunct
National Enquirer and Pennsylvania Freeman	Philadelphia	Pennsylvania	1836–?	Defunct
National Era, The	Washington	D.C.	1847–1860	Defunct
National Forum, The	Washington	D.C.	1910–19?	Defunct
National Savings Bank	Washington	D.C.	1868–18?	Defunct
New Age, The	Portland	Oregon	1896	Defunct
New Age, The	Butte	Montana	1902–190?	Defunct
New England Bulletin	Hartford	Connecticut	1949–19?	Defunct
New Era	Washington	D.C.	1870–1870	Defunct
New Era, The	Omaha	Nebraska	1921	Extant
New Journal and Guide	Norfolk	Virginia	1900	Extant
New National Era	Washington	D.C.	1870–1874	Defunct
New Orleans Tribune, The	New Orleans	Louisiana	1985	Extant
New York Amsterdam News	New York City	New York	1909	Extant
North Carolina Gazette	Raleigh	North Carolina	1885–18?	Defunct
North Carolina Republican	Raleigh	North Carolina	1879–1880	Defunct
North Star, The	Rochester	New York	1847–1851	Defunct
Northwestern Bulletin, The	St. Paul	Minnesota	1922–1924	Defunct
Northwestern Bulletin-Appeal, The	St. Paul	Minnesota	1924–1925	Defunct
Oakland Post, The	Oakland	California	1963	Extant
Oakland Sunshine	Oakland	California	1897–1922	Defunct
Ohio Daily-Express, The	Dayton	Ohio	1946–1950	Defunct
Ohio State News	Columbus	Ohio	1944–1952	Defunct
Omaha Chronicle	Omaha	Nebraska	1933	Extant
Omaha Guide	Omaha	Nebraska	1927	Extant
Omaha Star	Omaha	Nebraska	1938	Extant
Omaha Whip, The	Omaha	Nebraska	1922	Extant
Our Time Press	Brooklyn	New York	1996	Extant
Peoples' Advocate, The	New Bern	North Carolina	1886–188?	Defunct
People's Advocate, The	Alexandria	Virginia	1874	Extant
People's Recorder, The	Columbia	South Carolina	1893–1925	Defunct
Philadelphia Independent, The	Philadelphia	Pennsylvania	1931–1971	Defunct
Philadelphia Tribune	Philadelphia	Pennsylvania	1884	Extant
Phoenix Index, The	Phoenix	Arizona	193?–19?	Defunct
Phoenix Tribune	Phoenix	Arizona	1918–193?	Defunct
Pioneer	Montgomery	West Virginia	?	Defunct
Pioneer Press	Martinsburg	West Virginia	1882–19?	Defunct
Pittsburgh Courier	Pittsburgh	Pennsylvania	1907–1966	Defunct
Portland Observer, The	Portland	Oregon	1970	Extant
Portland Times, The	Portland	Oregon	about 1919.	Defunct
Post Script	Fort Huachuca	Arizona	1945-1946	Defunct
Postscript of the Apache Sentinel	Fort Huachuca	Arizona	1945-1946	Defunct
Professional World, The	Columbia	Missouri	1901–192?	Defunct
Ravenswood Post	Menlo Park	California	1953–1981	Defunct
Republican, The	Maryville	Tennessee	187?–187?	Defunct
Richmond Free Press	Richmond	Virginia	1992	Extant
Rising Son, The	Kansas City	Missouri	1896–19?	Defunct
Roanoke Tribune	Roanoke	Virginia	1936	Extant
Robbins Eagle, The	Robbins	Illinois	1951–1963	Defunct
Rock Hill Messenger, The	Rock Hill	South Carolina	1896–1921	Defunct
Sacramento Observer, The	Sacramento	California	1962	Extant
San Francisco Bay View	San Francisco	California	1976	Extant
Savannah Tribune	Savannah	Georgia	1875	Extant
Seattle Medium	Seattle	Washington	1970	Extant
Seattle Republican, The	Seattle	Washington	1???–1915	Defunct
Sedalia Weekly Conservator	Sedalia	Missouri	1903–1909	Defunct
Semi-Weekly Louisianian	New Orleans	Louisiana	1871–1872	Defunct
Skanner, The	Portland	Oregon	1975	Extant
Soigne`+Swank Magazine	Wabasso	Florida	2020	Extant
South Carolina Leader	Charleston	South Carolina	1865–18?	Defunct
South Florida Times	Oakland Park	Florida	?	Extant
Southern Advocate, The	Mound Bayou	Mississippi	1933–19?	Defunct
Southern Indicator, The	Columbia	South Carolina	1903–1925	Defunct
Southern News, The	Asheville	North Carolina	1936–19?	Defunct
Southland Advocate, The	Asheville	North Carolina	19??–????	Defunct
St. Louis Argus	St. Louis	Missouri	1912	Extant
St. Louis Sentinel	St. Louis	Missouri	1968	Extant
St. Paul Echo	St. Paul	Minnesota	1925–1927	Defunct
Statesman, The. [volume]	Denver	Colorado	1889–1906	Defunct
Sun-Reporter	San Francisco	California	1943	Extant
Tennessee Tribune	Nashville	Tennessee	1992	Extant
Enterprise, The	Omaha	Nebraska	1893–1914	Defunct
Topeka Plaindealer, The	Topeka	Kansas	1900–1932	Defunct
Traveler Weekly, The	Peoria	Illinois	19??-Current	Extant
Tribune Independent of Michigan, The	Detroit	Michigan	1933–1935	Defunct
Tribune, The	Roanoke	Virginia	1951–19?	Defunct
Tri-State Defender	Memphis	Tennessee	1951	Extant
Tulsa Star, The	Tulsa	Oklahoma	1913–1921	Defunct
Twin City Star, The	Minneapolis	Minnesota	1910–19?	Defunct
Vanguard News	Terre Haute	Indiana	1994–1995	Defunct
Voice of the People	Laurel	Mississippi	19??–19?	Defunct
Washington Afro-American, The	Washington	D.C.	1892	Extant
Washington Bee, The	Washington	D.C.	1882–1922	Defunct
Washington Informer, The	Washington	D.C.	1964	Extant
Washington Sun, The	Washington	D.C.	1960s (mid)	Extant
West Virginia Digest	Charleston	West Virginia	?	Defunct
West Virginia Eagle	Montgomery	West Virginia	?	Defunct
West Virginia Enterprise	Charleston	West Virginia	?	Defunct
West Virginia Spokesman	Huntington	West Virginia	?	Defunct
West Virginia Weekly	Charleston	West Virginia	?	Defunct
Wilmington Journal	Wilmington	North Carolina	1928	Extant
Winston-Salem Chronicle	Winston-Salem	North Carolina	1974	Extant

== Online ==
- Atlanta Black Star
- Prime Tribune
- Black News Net]
- The Grio
- The Miami Times
- The Root
- The Skanner
- NewsOne
- The North Star, an online newspaper launched in 2018 by activist Shaun King
- Black Report
- Blacksourcemedia.com
- themetrorecord.com
- TJG News
- FVTV Media
- Shine My Crown
- The Savannah Herald

=== By state ===
Alabama | Alaska | Arizona | Arkansas | California | Colorado | Connecticut | Delaware | Florida | Georgia | Hawaii | Illinois | Indiana | Iowa | Kansas | Kentucky | Louisiana | Maryland | Massachusetts | Michigan | Minnesota | Mississippi | Missouri | Montana | Nebraska | Nevada | New Jersey | New Mexico | New York | North Carolina | Ohio | Oklahoma | Oregon | Pennsylvania | Rhode Island | South Carolina | Tennessee | Texas | Utah | Virginia | Washington (state) | Washington, D. C. | West Virginia | Wisconsin

== See also ==
- List of newspapers in the United States
- National Newspaper Publishers Association
