= List of African American newspapers in Arizona =

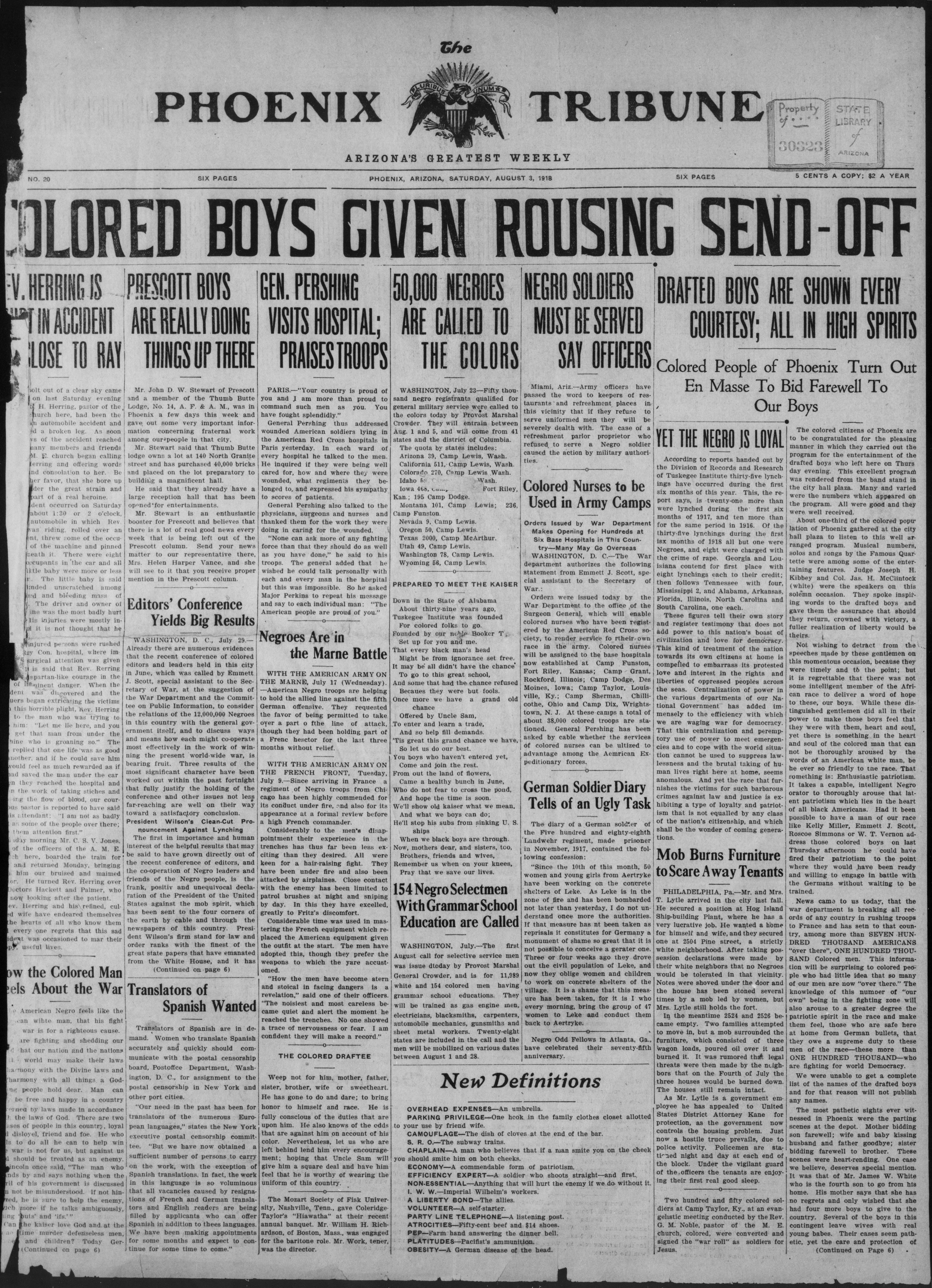
Front page of a 1918 issue of the Phoenix Tribune, filled with news of World War I.

This is a list of African American newspapers that have been published in the state of Arizona. It includes both current and historical newspapers.

The first African American newspaper in Arizona was the Phoenix Tribune, which was published from 1918 to the 1940s. Notable such newspapers in Arizona today include the Arizona Informant.

== Newspapers ==
City	Title	Beginning	End	Frequency	Call numbers	Remarks
Fort Huachuca	93d Blue Helmet	1942	?	Weekly	LCCN sn95060757; OCLC 35142260, 24621529	Published by the 93rd Infantry Division. Billed as "the first newspaper in the history of the army that has been published for a complete Negro division."; Available online
Fort Huachuca	The Apache Sentinel	1943	1945	Weekly	LCCN sn95060813; OCLC 31640242	Published by the 92nd Infantry Division.; Available online
Fort Huachuca	The Buffalo	1942	1945	Weekly	LCCN sn95060758; OCLC 35083693	Published by the 92nd Infantry Division.; Published from Fort McClellan, Alabama from December 19, 1942 to 1943.; Published in Northern Italy from September 1944 to October 29, 1945.; Available online
Fort Huachuca	The Bullet	1921 (uncertain) or 1922	?	Weekly	LCCN sn99063205; OCLC 40862983	Published by the 25th Infantry Regiment without government funding.; Available online
Fort Huachuca	Post Script of the Apache Sentinel	1944	1944	Weekly	LCCN sn95060817; OCLC 31640589	Published by the 92nd Infantry Division.; Available online
Phoenix	Arizona Black Dispatch	1976	1977?	Bi-weekly	OCLC 1204303805	Available online; First issue front page headline: "Arizona Black Dispatch Will Assist Black Businesses"
Phoenix	The Arizona Gleam	1929	1930s or 1946	Weekly	LCCN sn95060626; OCLC 33668826	Available online; Founded by Ayra Hackett and published by a primarily female staff.
Phoenix	Arizona Informant	1957	current	Weekly	ISSN 1095-2861; LCCN sn94093188, sn92060457; OCLC 32808244, 4202179, 9127287	Official site; The Informant was purchased by brothers Cloves C. Campbell Sr. and Charles R. Campbell in 1969 and restarted in 1971.
Phoenix	Arizona Now Newspaper	1972 (uncertain) or 1974	?	Monthly newspaper	LCCN sn96060832; OCLC 35234660	Published by Major Davis.
Phoenix	Arizona Sun	1942	1960	Weekly	LCCN sn84021917; OCLC 2701819	Available online
Phoenix	Arizona Tribune	1958	1973	Weekly	LCCN sn84021918; OCLC 2712104	Available online
Phoenix	The Phoenix Index	1936	1939	Weekly	LCCN sn96060866; OCLC 35591812	Available online; Founded by Rev. W. Gray and taken over in 1937 by Alberta Gibson, who aligned it with the Scott Newspaper Syndicate.
Phoenix	Phoenix Press Weekly	1970s	1980s	Weekly	LCCN sn96060882; OCLC 35643018	
Phoenix	Phoenix Sunday State	1920s	?	Weekly	LCCN sn96060627; OCLC 37539762	
Phoenix	Phoenix Tribune	1918	1930s or 1941 or 1946	Monthly newspaper	LCCN sn96060881; OCLC 35642959	Available online; Edited by Arthur R. Smith.
Phoenix	The Western Dispatch	1924	1929	Weekly	LCCN sn96060628; OCLC 37558532	
Tucson	The Arizona Register	1946	?	Weekly	LCCN sn00060068; OCLC 44799772	
Tucson	The Arizona Times	1925 or 1926 or 1930	1934	Weekly	LCCN sn00060009; OCLC 43452777	Edited by Louis J. Washington.; Available online
Tucson	Arizona's Negro Journal	1941 or 1942	1943	Weekly	LCCN sn87062100; OCLC 15305207	Available online
Tucson	Inter-State Review	1920 or 1921	1933	Weekly		Tucson's first African American newspaper.; Edited by E.J. Richardson.
Tucson	Spokesman	1920s	?	Weekly		Edited by George B. Cruikshank.

== See also ==
- List of African American newspapers and media outlets
- List of African American newspapers in California
- List of African American newspapers in Colorado
- List of African American newspapers in Nevada
- List of African American newspapers in New Mexico
- List of African American newspapers in Utah
- List of newspapers in Arizona

== Works cited ==
- Abajian, James De Tarr (1974). Blacks and Their Contributions to the American West: A Bibliography and Union List of Library Holdings Through 1970. G. K. Hall. ISBN 9780816111398.
- Danky, James Philip; Hady, Maureen E., eds. (1998). African-American newspapers and periodicals : a national bibliography. Harvard University Press. ISBN 9780674007888.
- Pride, Armistead Scott; Wilson, Clint C. (1997). A History of the Black Press. Howard University Press. ISBN 9780882581927.
- Smith, Jessie Carney (2012). Black Firsts: 4,000 Ground-Breaking and Pioneering Historical Events. Visible Ink Press. ISBN 9781578593699.
