= Cloves Campbell =

Cloves Campbell may refer to:

- Cloves Campbell Jr., former American politician
- Cloves Campbell Sr. (1931–2004), American politician and newspaper operator
