= List of African American newspapers in Nebraska =

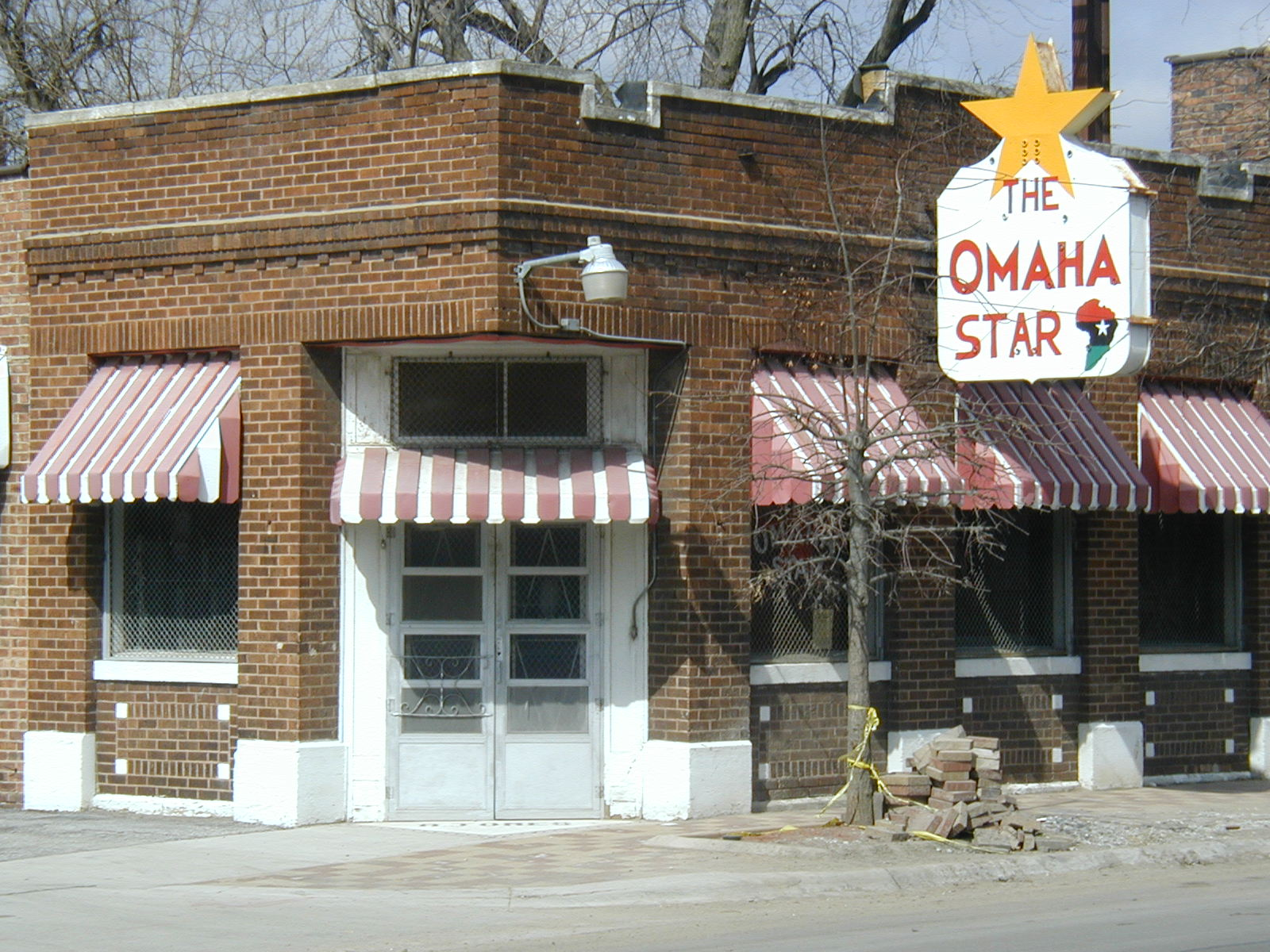
The Omaha Star Building, home to the Omaha Star.

This is a list of African American newspapers that have been published in the state of Nebraska.

Most African American publishing has been concentrated in the city of Omaha, which was home to about half of the state's African American population in the 19th century, and 70-80% in the 20th century. Some have also been published in Lincoln, home to a much smaller African American community.

The state's first known African American newspaper was the short-lived Western Post of Hastings, founded in 1876. The first commercially successful newspapers were established in the 1890s. By far the most successful and longest-lived of Nebraska's African American newspapers has been the Omaha Star, which was founded in 1938 and continues in operation today.

== Newspapers ==
City	Title	Beginning	End	Frequency	Call numbers	Remarks
Hastings	Western Post	1876	1877			"Nebraska’s first black newspaper for which evidence exists". In this period there were approximately 25 African Americans residing in Hastings. No copies survive.
Lincoln	Colored People’s Advocate	1919	1920			No copies survive.
Lincoln	Leader	1899	1899?			"The first black newspaper of which there is record" in Lincoln.
Lincoln	The Review	1919	1920	Weekly		No copies survive. Briefly designated as the official organ of the Prince Hall Grand Lodge of Lincoln. Founded and edited by Trago McWilliams, who sold it in 1920 to the Omaha Monitor, where it briefly became the paper's "Lincoln Department."
Lincoln	Review	1937	?	Weekly		
Lincoln	The Voice	1946	1953	Weekly		Last known African American weekly in Lincoln.
Lincoln	Weekly Review	1933	1933	Weekly		Published and edited by Trago McWilliams.
Omaha	Omaha Advocate	1923	1925	Weekly		
Omaha	The Afro-American Sentinel	1893 or 1896	1899	Weekly		
Omaha	American Record	1945	1948?			
Omaha	Omaha Chronicle	1934	1936			No copies survive. Edited by John Benjamin Horton, Jr.
Omaha	The Enterprise	1893	1914 or 1911	Weekly		Editors included Ella Mahammitt. "[O]fficial journal of the Nebraska State Afro-American League".
Omaha	Omaha Guide	1927	1958	Weekly		
Omaha	Omaha Journal	1930s	1930s			No copies survive. Edited by Ballard Dunn.
Omaha	Metro Star Times	1990	?	Unknown		Extant through November 1991
Omaha	The Omaha Monitor	1915	1929	Weekly		Marketed as a “national weekly newspaper devoted to the interests of Colored Americans.” Edited until 1928 by John Albert Williams.
Omaha	The New Era	1920 or 1922	1926			Edited for a time by George Wells Parker.
Omaha	The Progress	1889	1904			Founded by Ferdinand L. Barnett.
Omaha	Progressive Age	1913	1915?			
Omaha	The Omaha Star	1938	current	Weekly, currently biweekly		Founded by Mildred Brown, formerly of the Omaha Guide. Official site
Omaha	The Omaha Whip	1921	1921	Weekly		Founded by George Wells Parker, formerly of the New Era.; Published only two issues before dissolving.

== See also ==
- African Americans in Omaha, Nebraska
- List of African American newspapers and media outlets
- List of African American newspapers in Colorado
- List of African American newspapers in Iowa
- List of African American newspapers in Kansas
- List of African American newspapers in Missouri
- List of newspapers in Nebraska

== Works cited ==
- Danky, James Philip; Hady, Maureen E., eds. (1998). African-American newspapers and periodicals : a national bibliography. Harvard University Press. ISBN 9780674007888.
- Mihelich, Dennis N (1998). "Boom Bust: Prince Hall Masonry in Nebraska During the 1920s" (PDF). Nebraska History. 79: 74–84. Archived from the original on May 22, 2013.
- Paz, D.G. (1996). "The Black Press and the Issues of Race, Politics, and Culture on the Great Plains of Nebraska, 1865-1985". In Suggs, Henry Lewis (ed.). The Black Press in the Middle West, 1865-1985. ISBN 9780313255793.
- Rose, James M.; Eichholz, Alice (2003). Black Genesis: A Resource Book for African-American Genealogy (2nd ed.). Genealogical Publishing. ISBN 9780806317359.

== Elsewhere online ==
- "A history of African American newspapers in North Omaha," by Adam Fletcher Sasse for NorthOmahaHistory.com.
