= List of African American newspapers in Nevada =

This is a list of African American newspapers that have been published in the state of Nevada, which was "the last state to remove itself from the list of states that have never had a Black newspaper" in the mid-20th century.

While the late 19th century saw a flourishing African American press in many other Western states and territories, Nevada's African American population at the time was very low, falling as low as 134 in 1900. As a result, during that early period, "no Negro-owned newspaper, even of the most ephemeral kind, was published in Nevada."

== Newspapers ==
To be included in this list, a periodical should be mentioned in a reliable source as an African American newspaper published in Nevada.

City	Title	Beginning	End	Frequency	Call numbers	Remarks
Las Vegas	Metropolitan	1980s	?	Biweekly		Published by Jerome and Michael Jackson.
Las Vegas	News West	1980s	?	Weekly		Owned and edited by Phil Waddell.
Las Vegas	Las Vegas Sentinel	1980	1981 or 1982	Weekly	LCCN sn86076452; OCLC 14923758	Founded by former KZOB station manager Ed Brown.; Merged with Las Vegas Voice.
Las Vegas	Las Vegas Sentinel-Voice or Sentinel Voice	1981 or 1982	2014	Weekly	LCCN sn86076451; OCLC 14923699	One issue available online; Formed after Sentinel publisher Ed Brown bought out the Voice, and later edited by Lee Brown.; Publisher Ramon Savoy announced a halt to publishing on January 31, 2014.
Las Vegas	Las Vegas Voice	1962 or 1963	1981	Weekly	ISSN 0023-8546; LCCN sn79001009; OCLC 4576835	Founded by Dr. Charles I. West.
Reno	The Sentinel	1959	1975	Monthly newspaper		Founded and edited by Ruth Giles Jones.
Reno	Observer / Weekly News	1970s	1983	Weekly		Edited and published by Rev. Vincent Thompson.
Reno	Nevada Tribune	1945	1940s	Weekly	OCLC 35113761	"[P]ublished by Earl Perkins, and edited by Milton Love, a student at the University of Nevada."; Distinct from the 19th-century Nevada Daily Tribune of Carson City.

== Other publications ==
City	Title	Beginning	End	Frequency	Call numbers	Remarks
Las Vegas	Las Vegas Black Image	2009	current	Monthly magazine	OCLC 853683932	Official site
Las Vegas	I Sell The Shadow	1997	?	Unknown	OCLC 37305867	Published by Kim Russell.

== See also ==
- List of African American newspapers and media outlets
- List of African American newspapers in Arizona
- List of African American newspapers in California
- List of African American newspapers in Oregon
- List of African American newspapers in Utah
- List of newspapers in Nevada
- List of African American newspapers in Washington (state)
- List of African American newspapers in New Mexico
- List of African American newspapers in Georgia
- List of African American newspapers in Louisiana
- List of African American newspapers in New York
- List of African American newspapers in Texas
- List of Gypsy American newspapers in Nevada
- List of Mexican American newspapers in Nevada

== Works cited ==
- Berardi, Gayle K.; Segady, Thomas W. (1990). "The Development of African-American Newspapers in the American West: A Sociohistorical Perspective". The Journal of Negro History. 75 (3/4): 96–111. doi:10.2307/3031501. JSTOR 3031501. S2CID 142393523.
- Danky, James Philip; Hady, Maureen E., eds. (1998). African-American newspapers and periodicals : a national bibliography. Harvard University Press. ISBN 9780674007888.
- Highton, Jake (1990). Nevada Newspaper Days: A History of Journalism in the Silver State. Heritage West Books. ISBN 9780962304811.
- Kenan, Randall (1999). Walking on Water: Black American Lives at the Turn of the Twenty-first Century. Random House. ISBN 9780679408277.
- Pride, Armistead Scott; Wilson, Clint C. (1997). A History of the Black Press. Howard University Press. ISBN 9780882581927.
- Rusco, Elmer R.; Lynch, Hollis (1975). "Good Time Coming?": Black Nevadans in the Nineteenth Century. Greenwood Press. ISBN 9780837182865.
