= List of African American newspapers in Alaska =

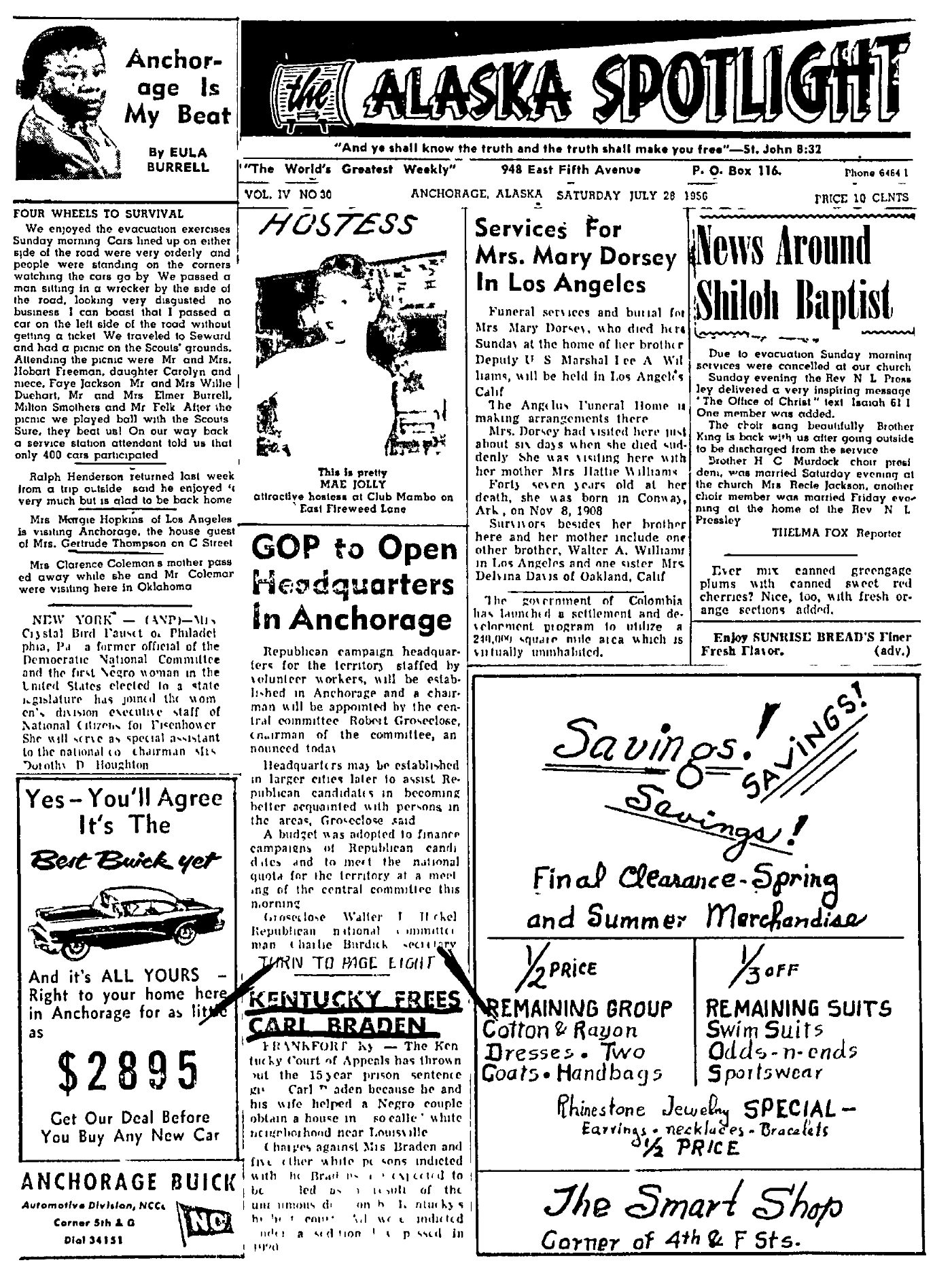
Front page of Alaska's first African American newspaper, The Alaska Spotlight, from 1956.

This is a list of African American newspapers that have been published in Alaska. All of them have been published in Anchorage, the state's largest city.

The first African American newspaper in the Territory of Alaska (1912-1959) was The Alaska Spotlight, which began publication in 1952 when Alaska was not yet a state.

== Newspapers ==
City	Title	Beginning	End	Frequency	Call numbers	Remarks
Anchorage	Crusader	1974	1974	Weekly	OCLC 39325095	Edited by Margaret L. Roblow Neal.
Anchorage	The Anchorage Gazette	1992		Monthly, weekly, or irregular	ISSN 2576-7380; LCCN sn98060276, 2011254011; OCLC 27696741, 664611171	Suspended from May 1993 to December 1995.; Published by Elgin R. Jones.
Anchorage	Midnight Sun Reporter	1962	1960s	Weekly	LCCN sn98060286; OCLC 39325101	Published by George C. Anderson.; Published through at least 1964. Suspended publication from 1962 to 1964.; Weekly circulation reached 2500 in 1962.
Anchorage	The New Horizon	1976	?	Weekly	OCLC 39325103	Edited by Alberta Jones.; Published through at least 1978.
Anchorage	The North Star Reporter	1982	1983?	Twice-monthly	LCCN sn99058168; OCLC 25569318	Published through at least 1983.
Anchorage	The Alaska Spotlight	1952	1960s	Weekly	ISSN 2574-5557; LCCN sn84025839, 2011254030; OCLC 664611169, 10411164	Published by George C. Anderson; Extant through 1968. Defunct by 1970.
Anchorage	Anchorage Town Crier	1994	1990s	Biweekly	OCLC 39325207	Edited by Dorothy Cox.; Published through at least early 1995.
Anchorage	Vox Populi	1978?	1980s	Monthly newspaper	OCLC 39325225	Published through at least 1981.; Edited by Al Stills.

== See also ==
- List of African American newspapers and media outlets
- List of African American newspapers in Hawaii
- List of newspapers in Alaska

== Works cited ==
- Alaska State Library (2000). Guide to Alaska Newspapers on Microfilm (PDF).
- Danky, James Philip; Hady, Maureen E., eds. (1998). African-American newspapers and periodicals : a national bibliography. Harvard University Press. ISBN 9780674007888.
- Overstreet, Everett Louis (1988). Black on a Background of White: A Chronicle of Afro-Americans ́involvement in Americaś Last Frontier, Alaska. ISBN 9780918270207.
- Pride, Armistead Scott; Wilson, Clint C. (1997). A History of the Black Press. Howard University Press. ISBN 9780882581927.
- Smith, Jessie Carney (2012). Black Firsts: 4,000 Ground-Breaking and Pioneering Historical Events. Visible Ink Press. ISBN 9781578593699.
