= List of African American newspapers in New Mexico =

This is a list of African American newspapers that have been published in New Mexico.

== Newspapers ==
City	Title	Beginning	End	Frequency	Call numbers	Remarks
Albuquerque	American	1896? or 1900	?	Weekly		Edited and published by J.M. Griffin and William H. Joyce.
Albuquerque	The Mountain States Recorder	1939?	?	Unknown	LCCN sn94056861; OCLC 30104409	Edited by Carl Mitchell.
Albuquerque	New Age	1911 or 1913?	1915	Weekly		Edited by Edward Thornton Ellsworth.
Albuquerque	The New Mexico State News	1950	?	Weekly	LCCN sn93061551; OCLC 28981261	Published by G. Daniel Choice.
Albuquerque	Southwest Review	1921 or 1928	1930	Weekly	LCCN sn94056884; OCLC 30488924, 15621855	Published by Silas W. Henry, it ceased publication upon his death.
Albuquerque	The Southwestern Plaindealer	1924	1920s	Weekly	LCCN sn95070601; OCLC 33286572	Published by S.T. Richards and Edna Greene Smith.
Albuquerque	Western Star	1940	1941	Weekly		Founded by Essex G. Jenkins.
Las Cruces	Western Voice	1937 or 1938	1940 or after 1946	Weekly or monthly		

== See also ==
- List of African American newspapers and media outlets
- List of African American newspapers in Arizona
- List of African American newspapers in Colorado
- List of African American newspapers in Oklahoma
- List of African American newspapers in Texas
- List of African American newspapers in Utah
- List of newspapers in New Mexico

== Works cited ==
- Abajian, James De Tarr (1974). Blacks and Their Contributions to the American West: A Bibliography and Union List of Library Holdings Through 1970. G. K. Hall. ISBN 9780816111398.
- Danky, James Philip; Hady, Maureen E., eds. (1998). African-American newspapers and periodicals : a national bibliography. Harvard University Press. ISBN 9780674007888.
- Pride, Armistead Scott; Wilson, Clint C. (1997). A History of the Black Press. Howard University Press. ISBN 9780882581927.
- Smith, Jessie Carney (2012). Black Firsts: 4,000 Ground-Breaking and Pioneering Historical Events. Visible Ink Press. ISBN 9781578593699.
