= List of African American newspapers in Utah =

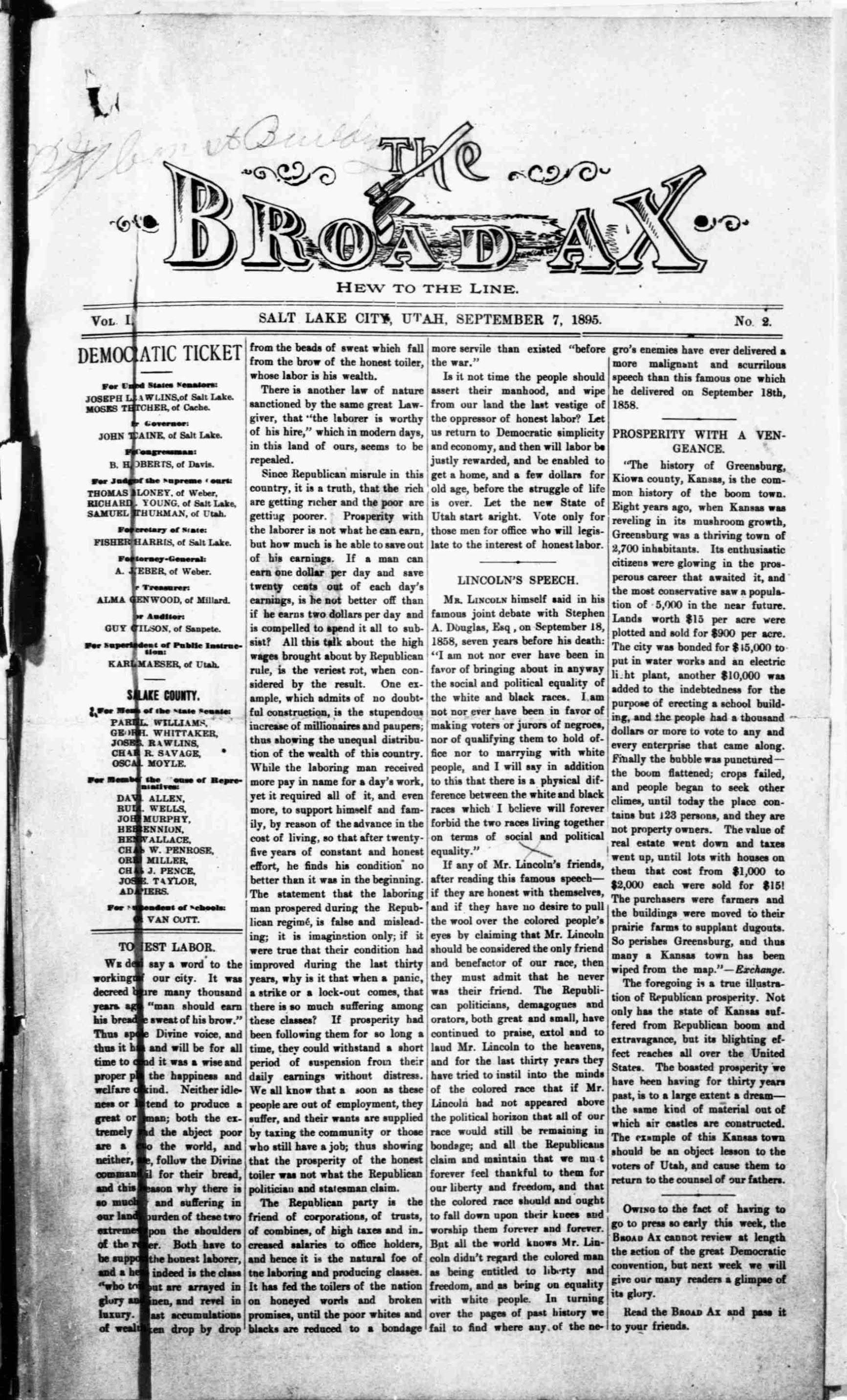
Front page of an 1895 issue of The Broad Ax, published in Salt Lake City.

This is a list of African American newspapers that have been published in the state of Utah.

Although new African American newspapers continued to be established in Utah through at least the 1990s, many of the state's historical African American newspapers date to a period of journalistic ferment between 1890 and 1910. During the late 19th and early 20th centuries, the state's African American population grew, reaching 1,144 in 1910. The state's first African American newspapers, The Broad Ax and the Utah Plain Dealer, were both established in 1895, and several others followed soon after. Many of these early local papers were members of the Western Negro Press Association, which held its fifth annual meeting in Salt Lake City in 1900. The Plain Dealer was the longest-lasting of the early papers, running for more than a decade from 1895 to 1909.

== Newspapers ==
City	Title	Beginning	End	Frequency	Call numbers	Remarks
Ogden	Ogden Eagle	1946	1947	Weekly or twice-monthly		Ogden's first African American newspaper.
Ogden	Intermountain Voice	1949	1951			
Salt Lake City	The Advisory	1992	?	Quarterly newspaper		
Salt Lake City	The Broad Ax / BroadAx / Salt Lake City Broad Axe	1895	1899	Weekly	LCCN sn84024055, 2011254257; OCLC 10392922, 664616893; ISSN 2163-7202	Available online; Moved to Chicago due to rising tensions with Mormon leaders, and continued as a Chicago paper until 1931.; Edited by Julius F. Taylor.
Salt Lake City	Democratic Headlight	1899	1899	Weekly		Edited by J. Gordon McPherson, with A.B. Douglas and A.H. Grice.
Salt Lake City	Tri-City Oracle	1902	1903	Weekly		Published by Rev. James W. Washington of Calvary Baptist Church.
Salt Lake City	Utah Plain Dealer or Plaindealer	1895	1909	Weekly		Founded by James Finley Wilson and William W. Taylor.
Salt Lake City	Town Talk	? (between 1890 and 1910)	?			Edited by Willis P. Hough.
Salt Lake City	Western Recorder	1897	1897	Weekly		Published by S.P. Chambers.
Salt Lake City	Wordpower	1970	1972	Biweekly	OCLC 17653614	Free newspaper supported by advertising.
Salt Lake City	Central Worker / Central City Worker	1971	1972	Biweekly	LCCN sn86091204; OCLC 13211697	Free newspaper supported by donations and grants.
West Valley City	The Mountain West Minority Reporter and Sentinel	1990	?	Bimonthly newspaper	LCCN sn86091581; OCLC 22576855	Advertised as "The voice of Black America in Utah, Idaho, Nevada, Oregon & Colorado."

== See also ==
- List of African American newspapers and media outlets
- List of African American newspapers in Arizona
- List of African American newspapers in Colorado
- List of African American newspapers in Nevada
- List of newspapers in Utah

== Works cited ==
- Abajian, James De Tarr (1974). Blacks and Their Contributions to the American West: A Bibliography and Union List of Library Holdings Through 1970. G. K. Hall. ISBN 9780816111398.
- Alter, J. Cecil (1938). Early Utah Journalism. Utah State Historical Society.
- Junne, George H. (2000). Blacks in the American West and Beyond--America, Canada, and Mexico: A Selectively Annotated Bibliography. Greenwood Publishing Group. ISBN 9780313312083.
- May, Dean L. (1987). Utah: A People's History. University of Utah Press. ISBN 9780874802849.
- Pride, Armistead Scott; Wilson, Clint C. (1997). A History of the Black Press. Howard University Press. ISBN 9780882581927.
- Sweeney, Michael S. (2009). "Julius F.Taylor and the Broad Ax of Salt Lake City". Utah Historical Quarterly. 77 (3): 204–221. doi:10.2307/45063211. JSTOR 45063211. S2CID 254439253.
