= Western Post =

First African American newspaper in Nebraska

The Western Post was the first African American newspaper published in the U.S. state of Nebraska. It was published in the town of Hastings between 1876 and 1877. No surviving copies of the paper remain.

== Publication and background ==
The newspaper was published in Hastings, Nebraska, by Horace G. Newsom, in 1876. He was 24 years old, and had come to Nebraska from Pennsylvania by 1873; he was employed as a bookkeeper in the city. In 1875, Hastings only had a black population of 25 people out of 2,817 (about 0.9 percent), (Note: The black population of the town grew to 327 in 1890.) while the 1890 United States census puts Nebraska's black population at about 9,000 (or 0.5 percent). Nebraska saw growth in its black population during the 1870s, in large part due to the flight of black southerners seeking better economic opportunities. Though small in number, Hastings had a distinct black community; over time, it developed separate white and black churches, recreation areas, and boy scouting organizations.

Upon its release, the Omaha Bee commented that it was "diminutive" in nature, but ultimately appeared to be a "creditably edited sheet", particularly noting that its primary editor, Newsom, was a manual laborer by day. The Colored Radical of Leavenworth, Kansas, called it "quite spicy", and hoped that the editor would meet with other liberal journalists to make it "a power for good".

No remaining copies of the newspaper remain. It was the first African American newspaper in Nebraska. Like other early African American papers, it was in the newssheet style. Subscription cost $1 per year, and it was planned to be printed bimonthly. The paper folded in May 1877 when Newsom left to work on the Freedom's Journal in Brookfield, Missouri.

== Notes and references ==
=== Bibliography ===
- Forss, Amy Helene (2013). Black print with a white carnation: Mildred Brown and the Omaha Star newspaper, 1938-1989. University of Nebraska Press. ISBN 9780803246904.
- Paz, D.G. (1996). "The black press and the issues of race, politics, and culture on the Great Plains of Nebraska, 1865-1985". In Suggs, Henry Lewis (ed.). The black press in the middle west, 1865-1985. Greenwood Press.
- Slattery, Christina; Pilgrim, Stacey C.; Franks, Kathryn; Squitieri, Amy R. (1999). Adams County: Nebraska historic buildings survey. Nebraska State Historical Society.
- "Nebraska news". Beatrice Express. Omaha Bee. August 21, 1876. p. 1.
- "A new paper". Colored Radical. August 24, 1876. p. 2.
- "The state at large". Grand Island Times. May 24, 1877. p. 4.
- "Hastings native explores history of blacks in area". Lincoln Journal Star. AP. March 30, 1998. p. B.
