= David Young (Louisiana politician) =

Louisiana reconstruction era American politician

Louisiana House of Representatives
- In office 1868–1874

Louisiana State Senate
- In office 1874–1878

Personal details
- Born: February 4, 1836 Kentucky
- Died: April 19, 1907 (aged 71) New Orleans
- Party: Republican

David Young (February 4, 1836 – April 19, 1907) was a farmer, businessman, minister and state legislator who served in the Louisiana House of Representatives and the Louisiana State Senate during the Reconstruction era. After the civil war during which he came a free man, he became a prosperous farmer, businessman, politician and minister.

== Biography ==
Young was born enslaved in Kentucky February 4, 1836, before running away to Ohio only to be recaptured and returned to Natchez, Mississippi in 1850 before finally arriving in Vidalia, Louisiana in 1851.

Towards the end of the American Civil War Young was active in the Louisiana campaign for black suffrage.

Young was elected to the Louisiana House of Representatives representing Concordia Parish, Louisiana serving from 1868 until 1874. His brother John Young was sheriff of the parish during the same period and together the dominated the Concordia political scene. At this time around 1970, Concordia Parish had a population that was 92.8% black.

He also became treasurer of the local school board from 1871 until 1873 and was also a member of the town council.

Young founded the four page Republican newspaper called the Concordia Eagle in 1873 which had the motto “Equal Rights to All Men” and was the editor until he was succeeded by James Presley Ball, Jr.

He was praised for having an "Intuitive knowledge of men, women and children" and a man that "the white people all loved" but said with much racist language.

Young then was elected to the Louisiana State Senate to serve from 1874 until 1878. In 1875 while a member of the Kellogg Senate, he was accused of embezzling funds from the school board while he had been the treasurer. He was forced to flee Concordia parish during a period of Democratic election violence and later cooperated with the Democrats to retain some Republican seats at a time when fair elections were deemed imposable due to violence and fraud.

Although he did not retain his senate seat for the next session he remained active in politics including being a member of the State Central Executive Committee of the Republican Party of Louisiana and a delegate to the Constitutional Convention representing Concordia.

In 1879 he decided to run again to serve in the house when he was nominated by the Republicans of Concordia. He was elected, however the issue of his previous embezzlement charge was brought before the Committee on Elections and Qualifications who judged on January 26 that he had been eligible to run. A few days later Young along with Harry Mahoney were denied their seats under article 171 of the constitution. His seat was given to Wade R. Young as the "only eligible candidate". In 1882 he was again elected to represent Concordia in the house, but again his legitimacy was challenged and was denied his seat. The case was brought before the house and again Young was declared intelligible ending in a resolution supported 52 yays to 22 nays.

After he left politics he became a Baptist minister in New Orleans and was head of the Zion Traveller's Baptist Church.

== Death ==
He died in New Orleans on April 19, 1907, and at the time was said to have been called "Bishop" due to his dignified bearing. At the time of his death, he had been the pastor of the Plymouth Rock Baptist Church and the vice president of the colored Baptist convention.

== See also ==
- African American officeholders from the end of the Civil War until before 1900
