= The Voice (Lincoln newspaper) =

African-American newspaper (1946–1953)

- Dedicated to the promotion of the cultural, social and spiritual life of a great people
- Type: Weekly
- Owner: Rev. Melvin L. Shakespeare
- Publisher: Rev. Melvin L. Shakespeare
- Advertising & Business Manager: Rubie W. Shakespeare
- City: Lincoln, Nebraska
- OCLC number: 1088505830
- Free online archives: https://nebnewspapers.unl.edu/lccn/2019270505/

The Voice was an African American newspaper published in Lincoln, Nebraska between October 1946 and May 1953. The newspaper was originally owned and edited by Melvin L. Shakespeare, Associate Pastor of Quinn Chapel A.M.E. Church, and managed by Rubie W. Shakespeare. The Voice was a member of the Associated Negro Press and maintained an association with the African Methodist Episcopal throughout the life of the publication. It was the last known weekly Black newspaper published in Lincoln.

== History ==
The newspaper was formed during the post-World War II years, when publication of Nebraska newspapers was experiencing a gradual decline. Originally printing eight pages per issue, theVoice had a subscription rate of $2.00 per year. By the end of its circulation, the paper had shifted to a four-page per issue format. According to the motto that appeared in the masthead for the life of the paper, the Voice was "dedicated to the promotion of the cultural, social and spiritual life of a great people."

Coverage was both local and national in scope. The paper included regular columns contributed by community members, promoted fundraising opportunities for local area high school students, and reported on community activities in Lincoln and other nearby Nebraska towns. The Voice frequently reported on race-related issues in Nebraska and across the country. Headlines such as "U.S. Wants Federal Anti-Lynch Law", "Truman Advocates Improved Race Relations" and "Johnson Becomes Fisk's First Negro President" often appeared on the front page and reports about the National Urban League and the NAACP were regularly included. Under Shakespeare's editorship, the Voice was politically neutral, supported capitalism, and was moderate on the issue of race advancement.

Early issues listed "Special Writers" in the masthead, including among them members of the Lincoln community such as Trago T. McWilliams, Sr., a Church of Christ (Holiness) minister and leader in Lincoln's Black community, and Lynwood Parker, University of Nebraska-Lincoln graduate and executive secretary of the Lincoln Urban League. McWilliams edited the short-lived Lincoln newspaper, the Review, before it was absorbed by the Omaha Monitor, where it continued to be published as "The Lincoln Department".

In November 1952, Shakespeare sold the Voice to Elbert Sawyer, who edited the paper until it ceased publication on May 14, 1953, after which Lincoln has not had a weekly Black newspaper.
