= Rosalind Juanita Harris =

Publisher of Denver Urban Spectrum newspaper

- Born: March 19, 1950; Grand Rapids, Michigan
- Education: University of Nebraska Omaha
- Occupations: Publisher and community activist

Rosalind Juanita "Bee" Harris (born March 19, 1950) is the founder of Denver Urban Spectrum, a monthly newspaper for people of color in Colorado. She founded the Urban Spectrum Youth Foundation in 2000.

== Biography ==
Rosalind Harris was born on March 19, 1950, in Grand Rapids, Michigan. Her parents were Ruth Smith Boyd and Doyle James.

Harris attended Davenport College of Business, Patricia Stevens Career Schools, and University of Nebraska Omaha.

=== Expanded description ===
Harris worked as a cartographer for Omaha National Bank from 1975 to 1977.

She owned and operated Salt and Pepper Art Studios from 1977 to 1980.

In 1980, Harris moved to Denver, Colorado with her two sons. She worked as a graphic artist and a production artist until 1984 when she became owner and operator of Production Plus/Spectrum Designs.

Harris recognized a lack of positive stories about Black and Brown residents in Denver, and a lack of opportunities for journalists of color. She founded the Denver Urban Spectrum (DUS) newspaper in 1987. DUS is a free monthly paper with news stories for people of color in the Denver area. The paper has a distribution of 25,000.

In 2023, Harris wrote The Story of Ruth, which is a narrative of her mother Ruth's story.

=== Community ===
Harris founded the Urban Spectrum Youth Foundation in 2000. The foundation is a journalism mentorship program of at-risk middle and high school students.

In the wake of Hurricane Katrina in 2005, Harris founded Spectrum of Hope to support displaced people in Denver.

Harris was appointed to serve as commissioner for Art, Culture, and Film by former Denver Mayor Wellington Webb.

Harris served on boards for Denver Metro Convention and Visitor's Bureau, CoLoursTV, Cleo Parker Robinson Dance Company, the Girl Scouts Mile Hi Council, the Five Points Business Association, Mothers and Daughters Inc., the Rocky Mountain Women's Institute, the Metro State College President's Community Advisory Council, and the Colorado Historical Society’s African American Advisory Council.

=== Personal life ===
Harris is divorced and has two sons and three grandchildren.

== Published works ==
- The Story of Ruth. ISBN 979-8988333302

== Recognition ==
The Colorado Association of Black Journalists recognized the Urban Spectrum Youth Foundation for its work with Black middle and high school students.

In 2000, Harris was honored as a Woman of Distinction by the Girl Scouts of Colorado.

In 2020, Harris was inducted into the Colorado Women's Hall of Fame. She also received the Martin Luther King Jr. Peace Award from Metropolitan State University of Denver.

In 2022, Harris was inducted into the Denver Press Club Hall of Fame.
