= List of African American newspapers in Hawaii =

This is a list of African American newspapers that have been published in Hawaii. From the 1980s to the 2000s, there was consistently at least one African American newspaper being published in Hawaii.

The history of the African American press in Hawaii is comparatively brief, starting only with the publication of the short-lived monthly newspaper Harambee in 1974. Records remained so sparse that the founders of the Afro-Hawaiian News in 1987 were unaware of the previous newspaper's existence. As a result, some historians have listed Hawaii among the states that have never had an African American newspaper.

== Newspapers ==
City	Title	Beginning	End	Frequency	Call numbers	Remarks
Keaau / Pearl City (1988) / Honolulu (1988–1991) / Hilo (1992–?)	AHN News / Afro-Hawaiʻi News (1988–1991) / Afro-Hawaiian News	1987	1990s	Monthly newspaper	LCCN sn88099789, 2011254036; OCLC 18689083, 1066593392, 707636336, 44095994	Longest-lived African American newspaper in Hawaii.; Edited initially by Howard "Stretch" Johnson.; Published by the Afro-American Association of Hawaii.
Honolulu	Harambee	1974	?	Unknown		First known African American newspaper in Hawaii.
Pearl City	Mahogany	1988 or 1989	1990 or 2000s	Monthly newspaper	LCCN sn89099302; OCLC 20791361	

== See also ==
- List of African American newspapers and media outlets
- List of African American newspapers in Alaska
- List of newspapers in Hawaii

== Works cited ==
- Chapin, Helen Geracimos (1996). Shaping History: The Role of Newspapers in Hawai'i. University of Hawaii Press. ISBN 9780824817183.
- Danky, James Philip; Hady, Maureen E., eds. (1998). African-American newspapers and periodicals : a national bibliography. Harvard University Press. ISBN 9780674007888.
- Jackson, Miles M. (2001). And They Came: A Brief History and Annotated Bibliography of Blacks in Hawaii. FOUR-G Publishers. ISBN 9781885066978.
- Jackson, Miles M. (2004). "Striving Towards Community". They Followed the Trade Winds: African Americans in Hawai'i. Social Process in Hawaii. Vol. 43. University of Hawaii at Manoa. pp. 232–236. ISBN 9780824829650.
- Johnson, Howard Eugene; Johnson, Wendy (2014). A Dancer in the Revolution: Stretch Johnson, Harlem Communist at the Cotton Club. Fordham University Press. ISBN 9780823256556.
- Pride, Armistead Scott; Wilson, Clint C. (1997). A history of the Black press. Washington, D.C.: Howard University Press. ISBN 0-88258-192-9. OCLC 36476957.
