= The Omaha Guide =

African American newspaper in Omaha, Nebraska

- Justice and Equality
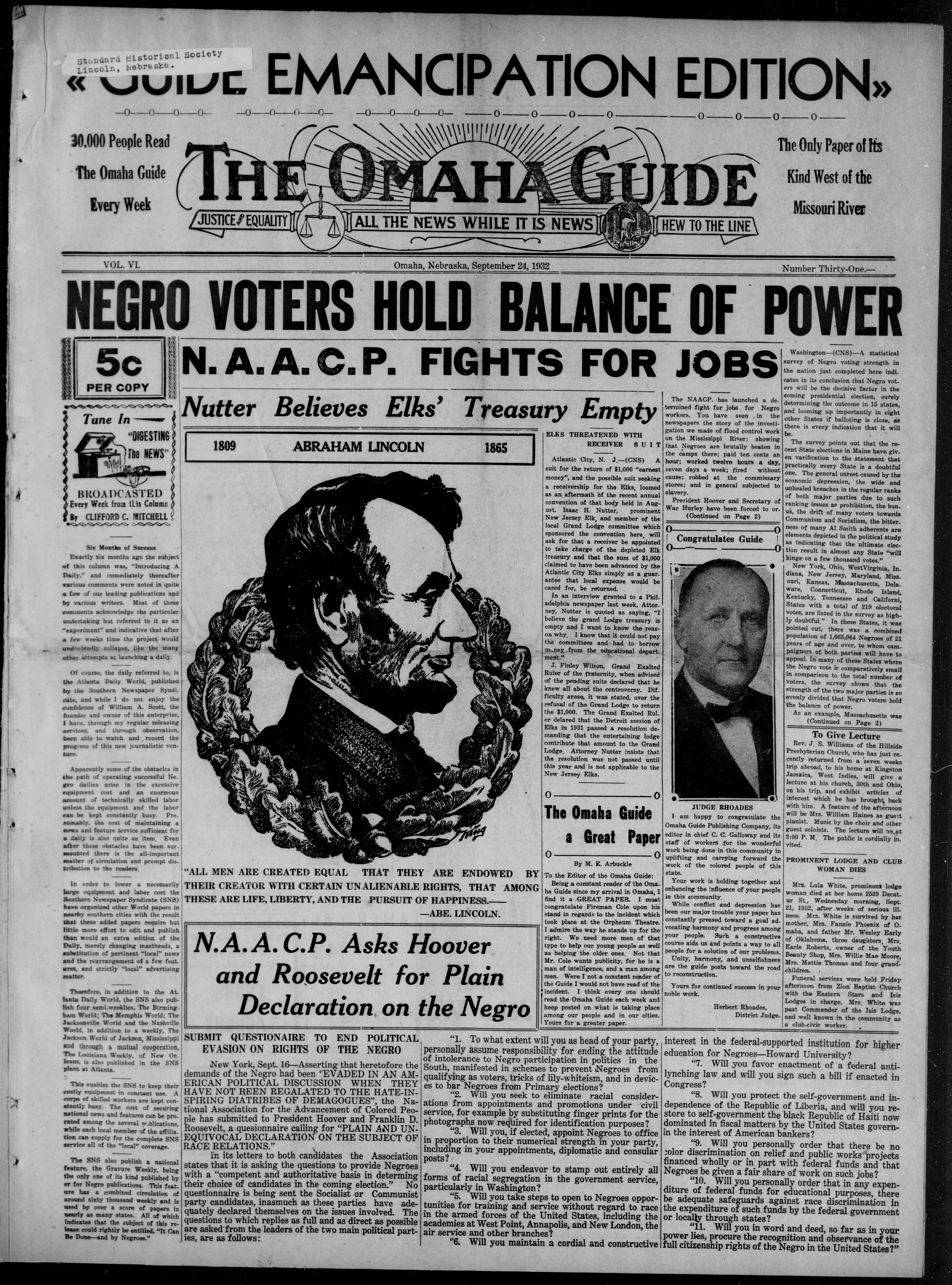
- Front Page of the Omaha Guide, September 24, 1932
- Type: Weekly newspaper
- Editor: Charles Chapman Galloway
- Free online archives: https://nebnewspapers.unl.edu/lccn/sn93062828/

The Omaha Guide was an African American newspaper in Omaha, Nebraska, published between 1927 and 1958. It was founded by Herman J. Ford, but editorial control was handed over to C.C. Galloway, a local businessman, after Ford's departure from the paper in 1930. Mildred Brown and her husband worked for the paper for a time, but left and founded the Omaha Star in 1938. The paper suffered low circulation in its final years due to competition from the Omaha Star and others, and it closed in 1958.

== Background ==
Nebraska has had a significant black press in the state since the late nineteenth century, though most of the commercially successful newspapers were in its city of Omaha. One of the prominent African American newspapers in the city was the New Era, published between 1920 and 1926. (Note: The founding of the New Era has been lost, but its first editor was George Wells Parker, and in 1922, Count Wilkinson became its editor and owner.) After the New Era folded due to costs in August 1926, (Note: It closed temporarily in June, resumed soon thereafter, and then closed permanently.) Herman J. Ford founded the Omaha Guide on February 27, 1927, which revolved primarily around the area of North 24th Street.

== Publication and contents ==
The issues of the Omaha Guide for its first five years have been lost. It likely struggled financially in its early years, as it had trouble paying the Associated Negro Press for their services. In 1930, Ford left the paper (though still remained president of the Omaha Guide Publishing Company) and moved to Washington, D.C., only briefly contributing to the paper in 1937. C.C. Galloway, a local businessman, had editorial control over the paper after Ford's departure. In a 1931 letter, Galloway laid out his intentions to "put out a Red-Hot paper" that would "smash the color line with a cosmopolitan, by weekly, ten-page newspaper". He hired M.L. Harris (who published the St. Joseph Review in Missouri) and Arthur B. McCaw (a civil servant and law student) to oversee two of its departments and write for the paper.

While the paper originally had eight pages—four for an "Illustrated Feature Section" that contained fiction and other features, (Note: This section included several fictional works: "Marty Bell aka The Harlem Hurricane" by Edward Lawson (a story about a boxer that looks like Jack Johnson), short stories by Edward Worthy, and "The Clean Up" by Nick Lewis (a serialized piece of fiction about a crime-fighter African American man in Harlem).) and four for typical news content—by 1933, it was downsized to just four; throughout the 1930s, its size fluctuated between four and eight pages. Among its contributors were Cab Calloway, Louis Armstrong, Duke Ellington, and Earl Hines, musicians who reported on their visits to the city. Around the time of World War II, the Omaha Guide had much interest in world affairs outside of the Global North; they reported on Japan as liberators of India and the Philippines, reported extensively on the Second Italo-Ethiopian War, and reported on the Spanish Civil War to the extent that stories involved black people. While Galloway had originally supported Herbert Hoover over Franklin D. Roosevelt in the 1932 presidential election, the Guide gradually changed its political outlook; it subscribed to the communist-operated Crusader News Service, and printed radical material—including defenses of the League of Struggle for Negro Rights. (Note: Galloway departed from the Republican Party during this period, and led the North Omaha Democratic Club in 1934.)

Galloway's editorial control was subdued in 1937—around the same time as his disillusionment with radical economic policy—and the paper shifted to the right with the hiring of Mildred Brown and her husband Edward Gilbert. The Crusader News Service was replaced by work of the more moderate Floyd J. Calvin. A year later, Brown and Gilbert left the paper and founded the Omaha Star, (Note: Still in production today.) while Galloway took editorial control of the paper again. Compared to other African American newspapers in Omaha around the same time—the New Era and the Monitor—the Omaha Guide was considerably larger, and it focused more on political and cultural life. In 1939, the Omaha Guide's printers were burned in a fire, and although the paper recovered, it returned to its four page layout for six more years. Around this time, the paper had a circulation of 25,000.

== Demise and aftermath ==
Subscriptions declined for the Omaha Guide thereafter, as the African American community of Omaha was largely satisfied with other newspapers, including the Omaha Star and the Omaha World-Herald. The final issue was printed on March 15, 1958. After the paper folded, the only remaining black newspaper for Omaha was the Omaha Star.

== Notes and references ==
=== Bibliography ===
- Breaux, Richard M. (2012). "The new negro renaissance in Omaha and Lincoln, 1910–1940". In Glasrud, Bruce A.; Wintz, Cary D. (eds.). The Harlem Renaissance in the American West: The new negro's western experience. Routledge. ISBN 9780203805589.
- Larsen, Lawrence H.; Cottrell, Barbara J.; Dalstrom, Harl A.; Dalstrom, Kay Calamé (2007). Upstream metropolis: An urban biography of Omaha and Council Bluffs. University of Nebraska Press. ISBN 9780803280021.
- Paz, D.G. (1996). "The black press and the issues of race, politics, and culture on the Great Plains of Nebraska, 1865-1985". In Suggs, Henry Lewis (ed.). The black press in the middle west, 1865-1985. Greenwood Press.
