= Phoenix Tribune =

Former newspaper in Phoenix, Arizona

- Pluribus Unum; Latin for "Out of Many, One"
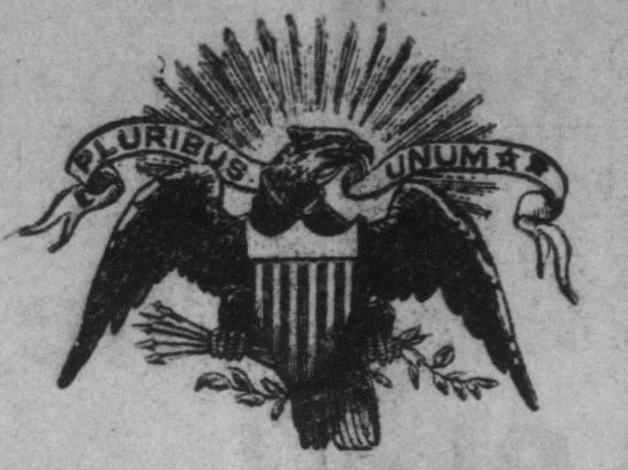

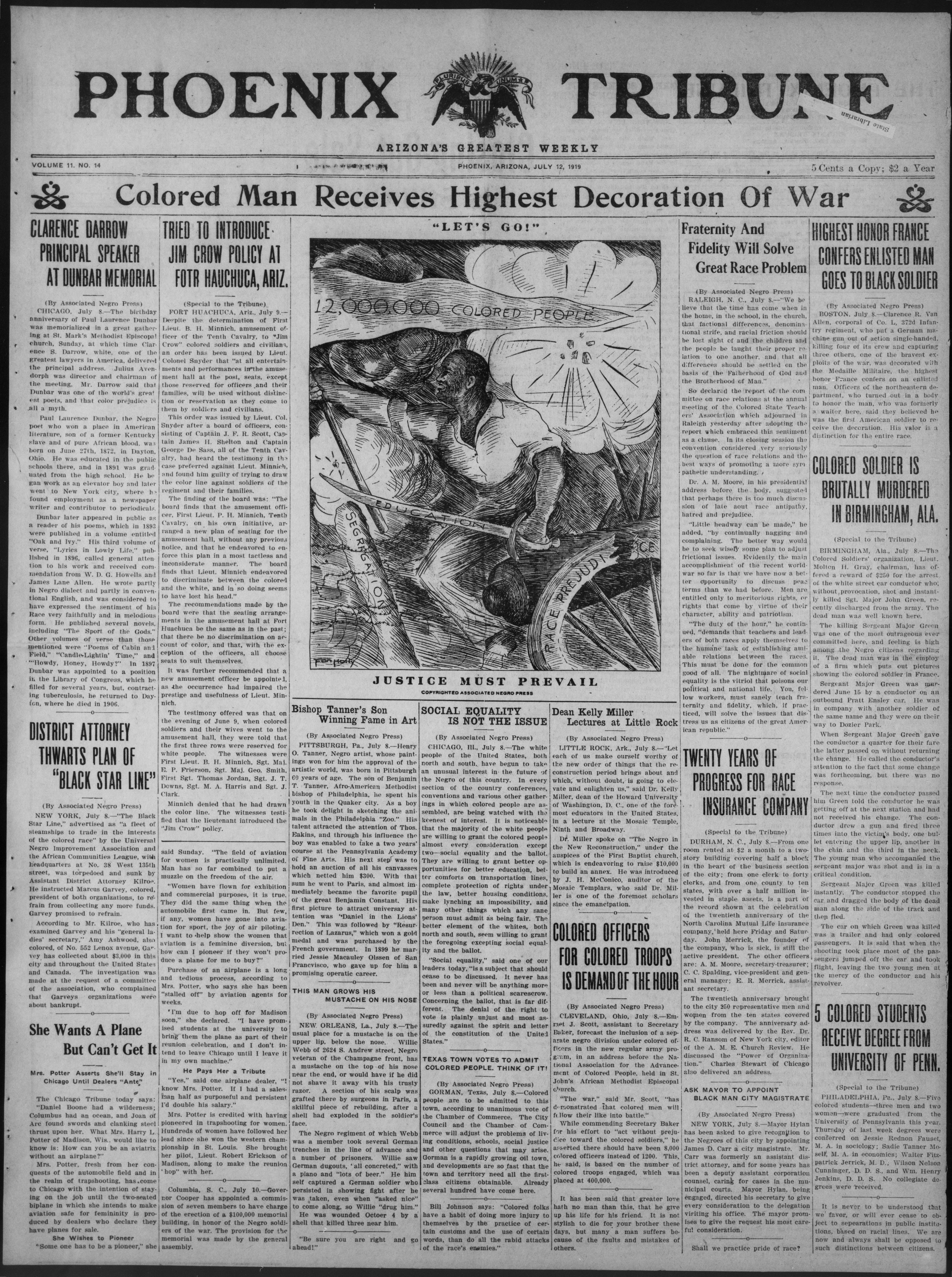
- July 12, 1919 Front Cover
- Type: Weekly newspaper
- Format: Broadsheet
- Publisher: Arthur Randolph Smith
- Associate editor: Helen Harper Vance
- Founded: 1918
- Ceased publication: 1931
- Political alignment: Civil and political rights
- City: Phoenix, Arizona
- OCLC number: 35642959
- Free online archives: Online LoC archives

The Phoenix Tribune was the first African American newspaper in Arizona. Founded in 1918 by Arthur Randolph Smith, he was the main editor of the magazine until it folded in 1931.

== Media coverage ==
Arizona newspapers covered the launch of the Tribune and local paper Arizona Republican supported it, and subscription advertisements for the Phoenix Tribune appeared in the Republican.

It is edited, owned and managed by one man, A. R. Smith who says it is his first venture into journalism. It [sic] that case his work is miraculously clever, his paper is neat and clean and we are glad to see that it is well patronized by advertisers.

— Arizona Republican., March 31, 1918

== Paper mottos ==
- "We originate – others imitate"
- "Always improving"
- "Arizona's Greatest Weekly"
- "Arizona's Leading Newspaper...Key to Happiness in 10,000 Homes"

== History ==
The Tribune advertised and promoted the local African American community and African American-owned businesses. It appealed to its readers to patronize companies that "spend your money where you are welcome." The Tribune published domestic, national and international news, and reported civil rights issues including the effects of World War I and racism. Newspapers began with weekly magazines and were 4 to 10 pages long. The special edition was over 12 pages with over 30 pages full of advertisements. The paper was published weekly until 1923, when the newspaper appeared first only once every two weeks, then once a month, and finally only once every few months, until it did not appear in 1931.

== Bibliography ==
Notes

References

- Arizona Republican (March 31, 1918). "A good start" (Daily). Arizona Republican. Phoenix, Arizona: Dwight B. Heard. ISSN 0892-8711. OCLC 2609778.
- Library of Congress (2019). "About Phoenix tribune. (Phoenix, Ariz.)". Federal government of the United States.
