= Denver Urban Spectrum =

- Spreading the news about people of color
- Type: Monthly newspaper
- Publisher: Rosalind Juanita Harris
- Editor: Tanya Ishikawa
- General manager: Lawrence A. James
- Founded: 1987
- Headquarters: Aurora, Colorado
- City: Denver, Colorado
- Circulation: 25,000
- Readership: 60,000
- Sister newspapers: Gulf Coast Urban Spectrum, Baltimore Urban Spectrum
- ISSN: 1085-634X
- OCLC number: 23866026
- Website: https://www.denverurbanspectrum.com/

Denver Urban Spectrum (est. 1987) is a newspaper in Denver, Colorado. Founded by Rosalind "Bee" Harris, describes themselves as filling a gap in the market for positive news stories by and about people of color.

== History ==
Rosalind Juanita Harris founded Denver Urban Spectrum (DUS) in 1987 to address the lack of positive articles about people of color.

The DUS headquarters had a fire in 1989 that almost shut down the newspaper, but community fundraising helped with the paper's financial troubles.

As a way of supporting youth of color who are interested in journalism, DUS and Harris founded Urban Spectrum Youth Foundation in 2000. The foundation originally offered multi-week workshops, but now offers internships, seminars and other opportunities to middle- and high-school students.

In 2016, DUS developed the Montbello Urban Spectrum Edition as a bimonthly newspaper for the Montbello community.

In 2017, DUS expanded to offer the Baltimore Urban Spectrum and the Gulf Coast Urban Spectrum.

In 2023, DUS launched a podcast network called Expanding the Narrative Network. It is the first network in Colorado to showcase people of color in the community.

== Awards and recognition ==
DUS gives away awards to celebrate the BIPOC community in Colorado. The "African Americans Who Make a Difference" award is given to 14 people each February.
