= Mojo (newspaper) =

Newspaper in Harlem, New York, US

Mojo was a newspaper based in Harlem, New York City. The first issue was published in 1968. Poet Julian Ellison was editor of Mojo. As a new and independent publication, Mojo was "an organ of the Black Student Congress".
