= Arizona Informant =

Newspaper

- Type: Weekly newspaper
- Founder(s): Cloves C. Campbell Sr. and Charles R. Campbel
- Founded: 1971; 54 years ago
- Language: English
- City: Phoenix, Arizona
- Country: United States
- ISSN: 1095-2861
- Website: azinformant.com

The Arizona Informant is an African-American owned newspaper located in Phoenix, Arizona. It is the only African-American-owned newspaper in the state of Arizona.

== History ==
The Arizona Informant was started by brothers Cloves C. Campbell Sr. and Charles R. Campbell in 1971. The brothers began the newspaper as a response to the lack of information the African American residents of Arizona were given.

Cloves C. Campbell Sr. was the first black state senator for the state and spent his ten years in legislature fighting for the civil rights movement. Charles R. Campbell was an educator who had a master's degree in public administration and his doctorate in higher education. When the brothers started up the newspaper they chose to utilize it by creating a voice for the black community and remain informed on the matters of the community

=== Modern times ===
Since the death of Cloves Campbell Sr., leadership has been taken over by Cloves Campbell Jr. The Arizona Informant remains the only black owned newspaper in Arizona. In 2017, the Arizona Informant joined other black-led businesses and organizations in calling for the removal of Confederate monuments in Arizona.

As of 2019, The Informant was published weekly on Wednesdays to the entire state with a circulation of 15,000.
