= The Alaska Spotlight =

Defunct African American newspaper in Alaska

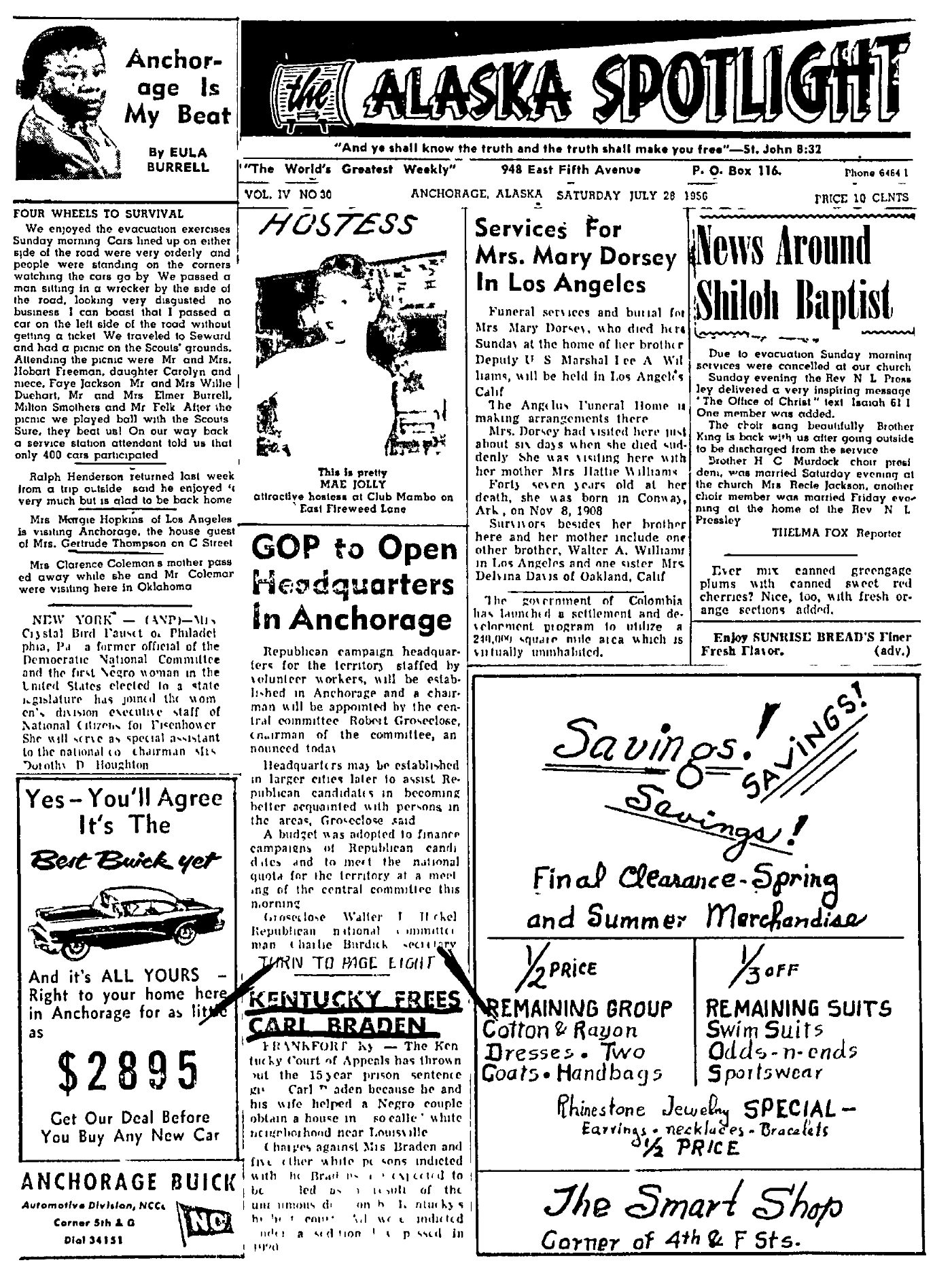
Front page The Alaska Spotlight from 1956

The Alaska Spotlight was the first African American newspaper in the Territory of Alaska. Publication began in 1952, when Alaska was not yet a state. It was a weekly newspaper published in Anchorage by George C. Anderson. It ran until the last 1960s.

According to Ed Wesley, "George C. Anderson arrived after World War II to work as a linotype operator for the Anchorage Daily News." In 1952, he established The Alaska Spotlight. Anderson later started another newspaper, The Midnight Sun Reporter (1962–1966).

== Works cited ==
- Smith, Jessie Carney (2012). Black Firsts: 4,000 Ground-Breaking and Pioneering Historical Events. Visible Ink Press. ISBN 9781578593699.
- Wesley, Ed (2020). Black History in the Last Frontier. University of Alaska, Anchorage: National Park Service.
