= The Concordia Eagle =

African-American newspaper

- "Equal Rights to All Men"
- Type: Weekly newspaper
- Format: Broadsheet
- Founder: David Young
- Editor: James Presley Ball, Jr., Love S. Cornwell
- Founded: 1873
- Ceased publication: 1890
- Political alignment: Republican
- Language: English
- Headquarters: Vidalia, Louisiana
- OCLC number: 10374740

The Concordia Eagle was an African-American newspaper published in Vidalia, Louisiana. Founded in 1873, it was a four-page weekly aligned with the Republican Party, aiming to provide a platform for African-American perspectives and advocate for civil rights during the Reconstruction era.

== History and Founding ==
The newspaper was established by David Young, a Louisiana state legislator and political figure. Young, a Republican, sought to address issues faced by African-Americans in post-Reconstruction Louisiana and provide a medium for political engagement. The Concordia Eagle became known for its support of civil rights and its call for African-Americans to build a presence in the South rather than migrate elsewhere.

== Opposition to the Exoduster Movement ==
In the 1870s, The Concordia Eagle voiced opposition to the Exoduster movement, which encouraged African-Americans to migrate westward to Kansas to escape Southern racial violence and economic hardship. Young advocated for staying in the South as a way for African-Americans to establish political and economic power locally. This position contrasted with the support for the movement expressed by some Northern newspapers.

== Editorial Changes and Influences ==
After David Young’s tenure, James Presley Ball, Jr. became editor. Ball, the son of a photographer and abolitionist, led the paper with a continued emphasis on civil rights issues. Following his time at the Eagle, Ball worked with the Seattle Republican, another African-American newspaper.

In 1885, Love S. Cornwell, a former Kansas state legislator affected by the conflicts of Bleeding Kansas, took on the role of editor. Cornwell’s experiences influenced his editorial stance, which included critiques of Southern policies affecting African-Americans.

== Decline and Legacy ==
The Concordia Eagle ceased publication in 1890, possibly due to challenges faced by minority-run newspapers in the South, including political opposition and financial difficulties. Surviving issues are held in collections at institutions such as the Library of Congress and Louisiana State University, offering insights into African-American press history.

The paper’s mottowas "Equal Rights to All Men".
