= The Broad Ax =

Defunct weekly newspaper (1895–1931)

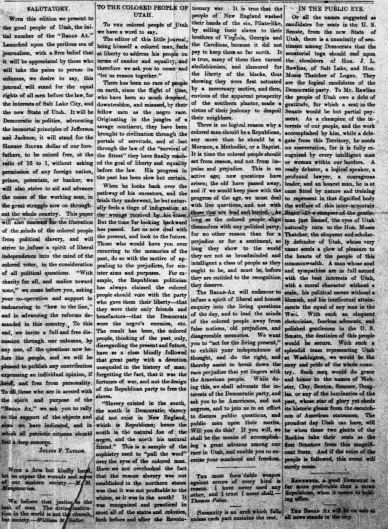
- Type: Weekly newspaper
- Owner: Julius F. Taylor
- Founded: 1895; 131 years ago
- Ceased publication: 1931; 95 years ago
- City: Salt Lake City, Utah (originally); Chicago, Illinois (from 1899)
- Country: United States
- ISSN: 2163-7202

The Broad Ax (1895–1931) was a weekly newspaper that began publication on August 31, 1895, originally in Salt Lake City, Utah, United States, by Julius F. Taylor. After a series of conflicts with the Latter Day Saints, Taylor relocated the newspaper to Chicago, Illinois, in 1899. The Broad Ax has been described as "the most controversial black newspaper in Chicago in the late nineteenth century", in some ways due to its criticism of Booker T. Washington and Tuskegee Institute. The paper covered African-American cinema.

The last known surviving issue of The Broad Ax is dated September 10, 1927, but an obituary for Taylor published in The Chicago Defender states that the newspaper ceased publication in 1931.

Issues for the years 1895–1922 have been digitized and are available for free online at Chronicling America and the University of Illinois Library's Illinois Digital Newspaper Collections.
