= West Virginia Weekly =

African-American newspaper

- "Official Negro press of West Virginia"
- Editor: Earl S. Koger
- Founded: 1933
- Ceased publication: 1935
- City: Charleston, West Virginia
- Country: United States

West Virginia Weekly was an African-American newspaper published in Charleston, West Virginia from 1933 through 1935. The editor was Earl S. Koger, and the paper's motto was "Official Negro press of West Virginia."
