= Cloves Campbell Jr. =

American politician

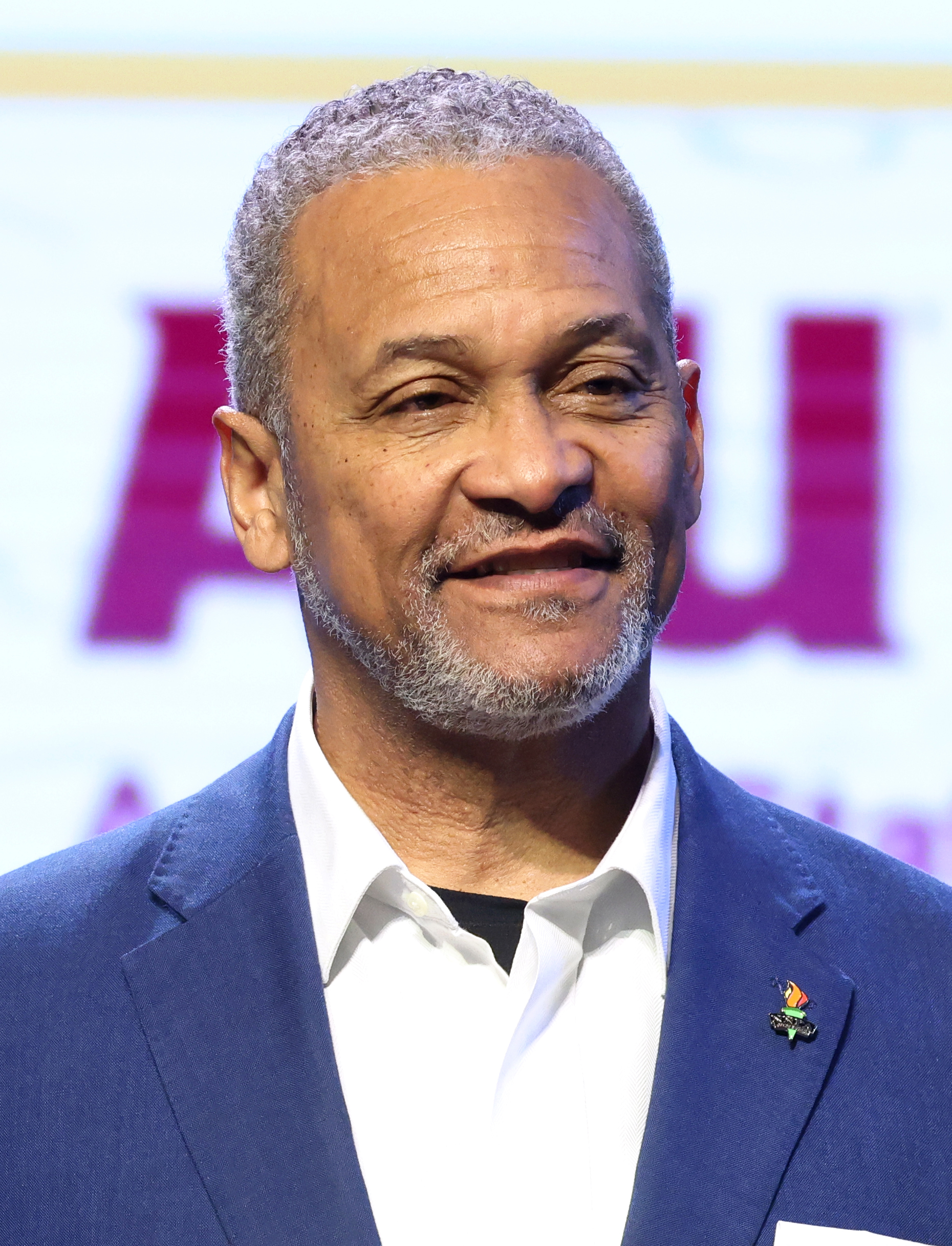
- Campbell in 2025

Member of the Arizona House of Representatives from the 16th district
- In office January 2007 – January 2011
- Preceded by: Leah Landrum Taylor
- Succeeded by: Ruben Gallego; Catherine H. Miranda

Personal details
- Party: Democratic
- Profession: Politician

Cloves Campbell Jr. is an American newspaper operator and politician who was a member of the Arizona House of Representatives from 2003 through 2011. A Democrat, he was first elected to the House in November 2006, and was re-elected in 2008. He lost re-election after losing to Ruben Gallego and Catherine H. Miranda in the 2010 Democratic primary. Campbell is the son of Cloves Campbell Sr. and the publisher of the Arizona Informant.
