= List of African American newspapers in Colorado =

Coordinates: 38.9972°N 105.5478°W

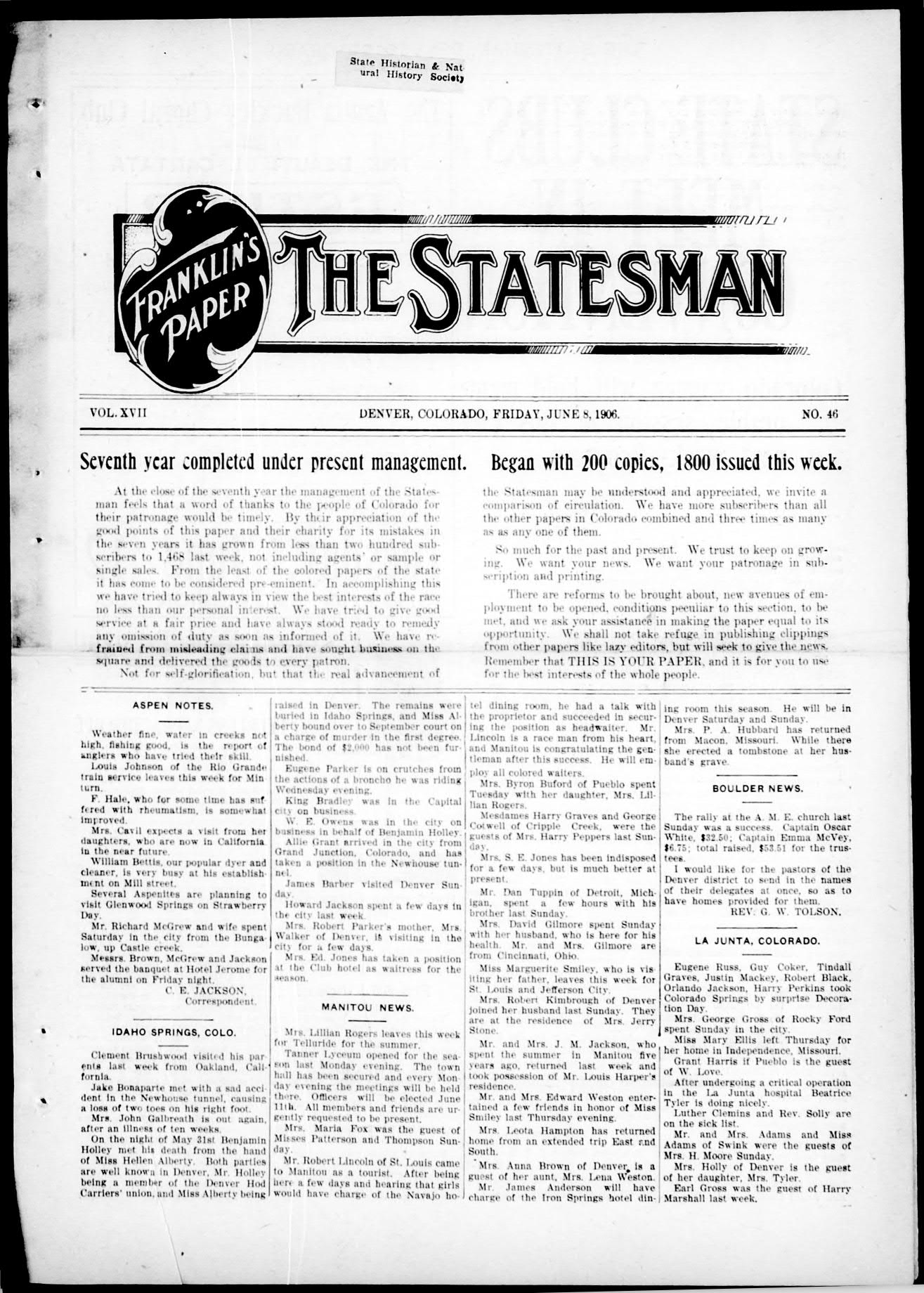
A 1906 issue of Franklin's Paper The Statesman, which adopted this name to avoid confusion with its competitor The Colorado Statesman

This is a list of African American newspapers that have been published in the U.S. State of Colorado. It includes both current and historical newspapers.

Many of the historical newspapers were published in the late 19th and early 20th centuries, when the number of African Americans in Colorado rose from 1,163 in 1870 to 11,453 in 1910. Colorado's first African American newspaper may have been the Denver Weekly Star, which was in circulation by 1881.

Notable newspapers in Colorado today include the Denver Weekly News, the Denver Urban Spectrum, and the African-American Voice of Colorado Springs.

The location of the State of Colorado in the United States

== Newspapers ==
City	Title	Beginning	End	Frequency	Call numbers	Remarks
Colorado Springs	African American Voice	1991	current	Monthly	OCLC 68567220	Official site
Colorado Springs	Colorado Advance	1906 or 1914	1917	Weekly		Edited by E.B. Butler.
Colorado Springs	Colored Dispatch	1900 or 1905	1913 or 1906	Weekly		Edited by Porter S. Simpson.
Colorado Springs	Colorado Dispatch	1909	1912	Weekly		
Colorado Springs	Eagle	1912	1913	Weekly		Full text of one issue available at Colorado College: Edited by Mrs. Julia Embry.
Colorado Springs	Light	1908	1912	Weekly		Edited by Frederick Mason Roberts.
Colorado Springs	Colorado Springs Sun	1897	1905	Weekly		Founded to fulfill "the need of an independent, reliable organ, wherein the Afro-Americans of this city . . . could find expression of their best thought and material progress."
Colorado Springs	Voice of Colorado	1912?	1914	Weekly		Full text available from Colorado College
Colorado Springs	The Colorado Voice	1948	?	Weekly	LCCN sn91052014; OCLC 23091158	Available Online, Colorado Historic Newspapers Collection
Colorado Springs	The Western Enterprise	1892 or 1896	1912	Weekly	LCCN sn83025515; OCLC 9542002	Available online
Denver	The African Advocate	1890	1891	Weekly	LCCN sn91052180; OCLC 23136641	Remembered for its support of the Back-to-Africa movement.. Available Online, Colorado Historic Newspapers Collection
Denver	Afro-American	1889	1890	Weekly		
Denver	Denver Argus	1886	1888	Weekly	LCCN sn91052506; OCLC 23122380	Only one issue of the Argus survives, from 1886.
Denver	The Denver Blade	1960 or 1961	1970	Weekly	LCCN sn84025889; OCLC 10571270, 3838302	Available Online, Colorado Historic Newspapers Collection
Denver	Denver Chronicle	1968	1970	Weekly	LCCN sn90051897; OCLC 22615918	
Denver	Denver Dispatch / The Denver Dispatch	1957 or 1958	?	Weekly	LCCN sn90051192; OCLC 21142342	
Denver	Denver Drum / The Drum	1971	1973	Weekly	LCCN sn88084252, sn90051193; OCLC 21142270, 18487506	Founded by Jessica Grant.
Denver	Colorado Exponent	1889	?	Weekly		
Denver	Denver Exponent	1892	1895	Weekly		Absorbed into the Denver Statesman. Edited by A.R. Wilson.
Denver (Five Points)	The Five Pointer	1938	1946?	Weekly		
Denver	Denver Independent	1902 or 1910	1913	Weekly		Founded by Thomas Campbell.; In 1916 the Star announced that “[t]he papers formerly known as The Statesman and The Independent have been merged into The Star.”
Denver	The Denver Inquirer	1952 or 1953	1954 or 1953	Weekly	LCCN sn87062123; OCLC 15347222	Generally listed as an African American newspaper. Billed itself as "non-racial, non-political, non-sectarian - Denver's Picture Weekly." Available Online, Colorado Historic Newspapers Collection
Denver	The Colorado Journal	1948	?	Weekly	LCCN sn89052182; OCLC 19764373	
Denver (Park Hill)	Denver East News	1965	?	Weekly	OCLC 64683674	Attested through 1970.
Denver	Denver Weekly News	1971	current	Weekly	LCCN sn90051216; OCLC 6352579	Official site
Denver	Denver Weekly Star / The Denver Star	1879 or 1881	1883	Weekly	LCCN sn91052508; OCLC 23122358	Founded by Lewis Price.; "[A]mong the first African-American newspapers published west of the Mississippi River."; Only one issue survives, but many editorials by Henry O. Wagoner from 1882–1883 were reprinted in The Christian Recorder, including his denunciation of the Supreme Court's decision in the 1883 Civil Rights Cases.
Denver	The Denver Star (1913–1963) / Franklin's Paper The Denver Star (1912–1913)	1912 or 1913	1963	Weekly	LCCN 2018218636, sn84025887, sn94081616; OCLC 1028638479, 10571156, 32229784; ISSN 2577-2384, 2577-2376	Available online; A continuation of The Statesman (est. 1880s). Known from November 23, 1912 to March 15, 1913 as Franklin's Paper The Denver Star, and then simply The Denver Star.; Sold by Chester Arthur Franklin in 1913 to the Denver Independent Publishing Company, which ran the paper until the end in 1963. Available Online, Colorado Historic Newspapers Collection
Denver	The Colorado Statesman	1895	1961	Weekly	LCCN sn8325514; OCLC 9541391, 23200610, 2636997, 8956794	Founded by Joseph D.D. Rivers. Rivers had also previously founded a different weekly called The Statesman, which was later known as The Denver Star.; Distinct from a white weekly that was later also called The Colorado Statesman (1898–2017), but until the 1970s was named the Colorado Democrat. Available Online, Colorado Historic Newspapers Collection
Denver	The Statesman / The Statesman-Exponent (1895–1896) / Franklin's Paper The Statesman (1906–1912)	1885 or 1888 or 1889	1912	Weekly		Available online; First owned by Joseph D.D. Rivers. Taken over by Edwin Henry Hackley, Colorado's first Black attorney, in 1892, and sold to George F. Franklin in 1898.; Briefly renamed the Statesman-Exponent in 1895–1896 following the acquisition of the Denver Exponent.; Renamed Franklin's Paper The Statesman in 1906, to avoid confusion with The Colorado Statesman. Became the Denver Star, which was initially known as Franklin's Paper The Denver Star, in 1912.
Denver	Times Speaker	1900s	?	Twice weekly		In circulation in 1902.
Denver / Aurora	Denver Urban Spectrum	1987	current	Monthly	ISSN 1085-634X; LCCN sn95005637; OCLC 23866026	Official site; Founded by Rosalind J. Harris. "Founded in 1987, the Denver Urban Spectrum (DUS) newspaper covers news and information for and about people of color."
La Junta	Megaphone	1913	1915	Weekly		Founded by Thomas L. Cate.
Pueblo	Rocky Mountain Advocate	1898	1899	Weekly		Edited by William Jeltz
Pueblo	The Western Ideal	1919 or 1923	1960	Weekly	LCCN sn94081602, sn93062831; OCLC 32229736, 27322066	Noted as a supporter of the 1940 Green Book.
Pueblo	Religious World	1906?	1908	Weekly		
Pueblo	Rising Sun	1919	1921 or 1923	Weekly		Founded by Thomas L. Cate, formerly of the La Junta Megaphone, upon his return from serving in World War I. Official local organ of the International Order of Twelve Knights and Daughters of Tabor.; May have subsequently become the Western Ideal after purchase by W.J. Jackson.
Pueblo	Colorado Times	1904	1912	Weekly		Founded by M.B. Brooks.
Pueblo	Times	1894	1895	Weekly		Edited by O.L. Boyd.
Pueblo	Tribune	1898	1900	Weekly		
Pueblo	Tribune-Press	1895	1904	Weekly		Edited by O.L. Boyd.
Trinidad	Leader	1911	1915 or 1912	Weekly		

== See also ==
- List of African American newspapers and media outlets
- List of African American newspapers in Kansas
- List of African American newspapers in Nebraska
- List of African American newspapers in Oklahoma
- List of African American newspapers in Utah
- List of newspapers in Colorado

== Works cited ==
- Abajian, James De Tarr (1974). Blacks and Their Contributions to the American West: A Bibliography and Union List of Library Holdings Through 1970. G. K. Hall. ISBN 9780816111398.
- Berardi, Gayle K.; Segady, Thomas W. (1990). "The Development of African-American Newspapers in the American West: A Sociohistorical Perspective". The Journal of Negro History. 75 (3/4): 96–111. doi:10.2307/3031501. JSTOR 3031501. S2CID 142393523.
- Census Bureau (1939). "Negro Newspapers and Periodicals in the United States: 1938". Negro Statistical Bulletin, Issues 1-17.
- Danky, James Philip; Hady, Maureen E., eds. (1998). African-American newspapers and periodicals : a national bibliography. Harvard University Press. ISBN 9780674007888.
- Junne, George H. (2000). Blacks in the American West and Beyond--America, Canada, and Mexico: A Selectively Annotated Bibliography. Greenwood Publishing Group. ISBN 9780313312083.
- Leavitt, Craig William (2014). Colorado Newspapers: A History & Inventory, 1859 – 2000 (PDF) (M.A. thesis). University of Colorado.
- Oehlerts, Donald E. (1964). Guide to Colorado Newspapers, 1859-1963 (PDF). Bibliographical Center for Research, Rocky Mountain Region.
