= Cloves Campbell Sr. =

American politician (1931–2004)

Member of the Arizona Senate
- In office 1966–1972

Member of the Arizona House of Representatives
- In office 1962–1966

Personal details
- Born: Cloves Colbert Campbell; April 12, 1931 Elizabeth, Louisiana, U.S.
- Died: June 19, 2004 (aged 73) Phoenix, Arizona, U.S.
- Party: Democratic
- Spouse: Juanita Lucritia Campbell (died 1994)
- Children: 4, including Cloves Jr.
- Education: Arizona State University
- Profession: Newspaper operator

Cloves Colbert Campbell Sr. (April 12, 1931 – June 19, 2004) was an American Democratic politician and newspaper operator. He was the first African-American to serve as a member of the Arizona Senate, holding the position from 1966 to 1972.

In 1971, Campbell introduced a bill to recognize Martin Luther King's birthday as a state holiday, but it failed to advance. He originally served as a member of the Arizona House of Representatives from 1962 to 1966. Campbell and his brother Charles purchased the Arizona Informant, a newspaper focusing on African-American coverage, in 1969. Founded in 1957, the Arizona Informant had not been published for several years at the time of the Campbells' purchase. He was also head of the Phoenix chapter of the National Association for the Advancement of Colored People (NAACP).

Campbell was born in Elizabeth, Louisiana. He was a graduate of Arizona State University (ASU). He was married to Juanita Lucritia Campbell until her death in 1994. The couple had four children, including Cloves Jr., also a member of the Arizona House of Representatives and the publisher of the Arizona Informant.

Campbell lost his eyesight due to diabetes in 1994. On June 19, 2004, he suffered a heart attack at the offices of the Arizona Informant in Phoenix. He was rushed to a nearby medical center, where he was pronounced dead at the age of 73.

Namesakes in honor of Campbell include Cloves C. Campbell Sr. Elementary School in Phoenix and the Cloves Campbell Sr. Scholarship, offered at ASU.
