= The Buffalo =

Newspaper of the 92nd Infantry from 1942–1945

- Type: Weekly newspaper
- Publisher: 92nd Infantry Division, Special Service Office and Public Relations
- Founded: December 19, 1942
- Language: English
- Ceased publication: 1945
- Headquarters: Fort McClellan, Fort Huachuca, Northern Italy
- OCLC number: 35083693

The Buffalo was a military Black newspaper published by the 92nd Infantry Division of the United States Army during World War II. The paper was named for the all-Black division, which was nicknamed the "Buffalo Soldiers". The division was one of the only all-Black American units to enter combat during the war, and its weekly newspaper became one of the most prominent of the many military papers that existed at the time. Over the three years until the division's disbandment, The Buffalo had six volumes and over 150 issues.

== History ==
The 92nd Infantry Division was an all-Black unit of the segregated United States Army. The division served in World War I and was reactivated on October 15, 1942 for World War II. It was nicknamed the "Buffalo Soldiers Division" to honor the Black troops who had fought on the American Frontier following the American Civil War.

While in training, the unit began to publish an eight page weekly newspaper called The Buffalo. The first edition came out December 19, 1942, from Fort McClellan, Alabama. Its price was 5 cents. The paper's initial purpose was to support the division's goals in training up a unified fighting unit, and it, like many other camp newspapers, attempted to keep troops informed, entertained, proud, and well-trained. The paper featured cartoons from its first issue, and they were used for comedy and training reminders. The paper began at the direction of the commander of the 92nd Division, Edward Almond, who was fervently racist and did not believe in the competence of Black soldiers, yet was given command of the division throughout World War II.

The division organized the Buffalo Press Bureau to run the newspaper out of Fort McClellan, where the division was headquartered. The Bureau gathered news and images every week from parts of the division that were training at camps in other states. Staff included correspondents, columnists, and photographers, and they wrote headlines and laid the paper out before having the offices of The Anniston Times in Alabama print the paper.

In 1943, The Buffalo won a Camp Newspaper Service Achievement Award from a competition between 350 newspapers in the United States Armed Forces, with newspaper quality judged by editors from notable civilian press. It was the only infantry newspaper to earn the award, and it resulted in increased circulation outside its intended audience of division members. There was new readership from other parts of the military, as well as civilians and journalists. Praise was not universal, with one soldier in the division calling The Buffalo "trash" compared to the U.S. Army's newspaper, the Stars & Stripes.

When the 92nd Infantry Division combined its units together at Fort Huachuca, Arizona in 1943, the newspaper moved as well. Its first edition from Fort Huachuca was May 12, 1943, where Colonel Edwin N. Hardy, Post Commander, wrote an editorial announcing that the fort now contained the most Black soldiers assembled in one place anywhere in the world. At the time, the editor of the paper was Private Earl Mason. At Fort Huachuca, the paper reorganized as "the bigger and better BUFFALO" and added new content, like Spanish lessons or stories on the two Black Women’s Army Auxiliary Corps that were also at the fort.

In August 1944, The Buffalo became independent from printing companies by obtaining its own printing press, typesetter, and engraving system. The 92nd Division left for combat in Italy in September 1944, and from then on the paper was also published from Italy. By this time, the newspaper was managed by the 92nd Division's Public Relations Section. Other troop newspapers were published from Fort Huachuca as different divisions trained at the fort.

During the paper's final issues towards the end of World War II, and before the unit's deactivation, it focused on aiding soldier's transitions back to civilian life. The paper's final issue was written October 29, 1945 from Northern Italy. The front page article covered the 92nd Division's honoring by the Italian Lieutenant General and prince Umberto, who awarded the unit the Italian Military Cross. Later, the 92nd Division's veteran's association published a newsletter also called The Buffalo.

== Content ==
Throughout most of its run, The Buffalo took an eight page weekly newspaper format. Columns included "Chaplain's Corner," "Buffalo Bull," "After Hours," "Oxford Shorty," and "At Ease!" The paper frequently hosted competitions and fundraisers, and it also had a sports page covering baseball, basketball, boxing, football, and track races. There were also many cartoons, including "G.I. Smoothie," "Strechin’ a-Point," "Buffalo Billie," and "Wacky Women." Regimental commanders provided photos and news each week from the different units in the division. The paper included coverage of the Black celebrities who visited the division for morale, including Joe Louis, Lena Horne, Eddie Anderson and Hattie McDaniel. Issues also included pictures of pin-up girls and inspiring stories.

== Writers ==
Some of the writers and cartoonists who contributed to The Buffalo also had successful careers in civilian journalism, before or after the war.

- Thaddeus (Ted) Shearer illustrated cartoons throughout the whole run of the paper. He had previously contributed to magazines and went on to create Quincy.
- Earl Mason was a news editor for the paper.
- John Horne worked as sports editor.
- Ray Henry contributed cartoons beginning in July 1943 and wrote layout. He previously had contributed to civilian publications.
- Verdun Cook worked as a photographer and lithographer.
- Robert Stoakley worked as a photographer.
- Larry Birleffi worked as Editorial Supervisor and was also Public Relations Officer for the 92nd Division.
- Roscoe Murray worked on the staff as a photographer and was one of the first trained to use their printing press.
- William Byrd also worked on the staff.
- B. L. Bion contributed for the 371st Combat Team, E. T. Mayfield contributed for the 370th Combat Team, and D. P. Dix contributed for the 365th Combat Team.
- James S. Williams, D. Cato Suggs, John R. Scott, Wesley Brown, and Robert Scott edited the combat team contributions.

== Recognition ==
The Buffalo received a Camp Newspaper Service Achievement Award soon after its creation. Ted Shearer later received the Bronze Star for his work as an art editor for The Buffalo.
