= Omaha Monitor =

African American newspaper in Omaha, Nebraska

- A weekly newspaper devoted to the interests of the eight thousand colored people in Omaha and vicinity, and to the good of the community.
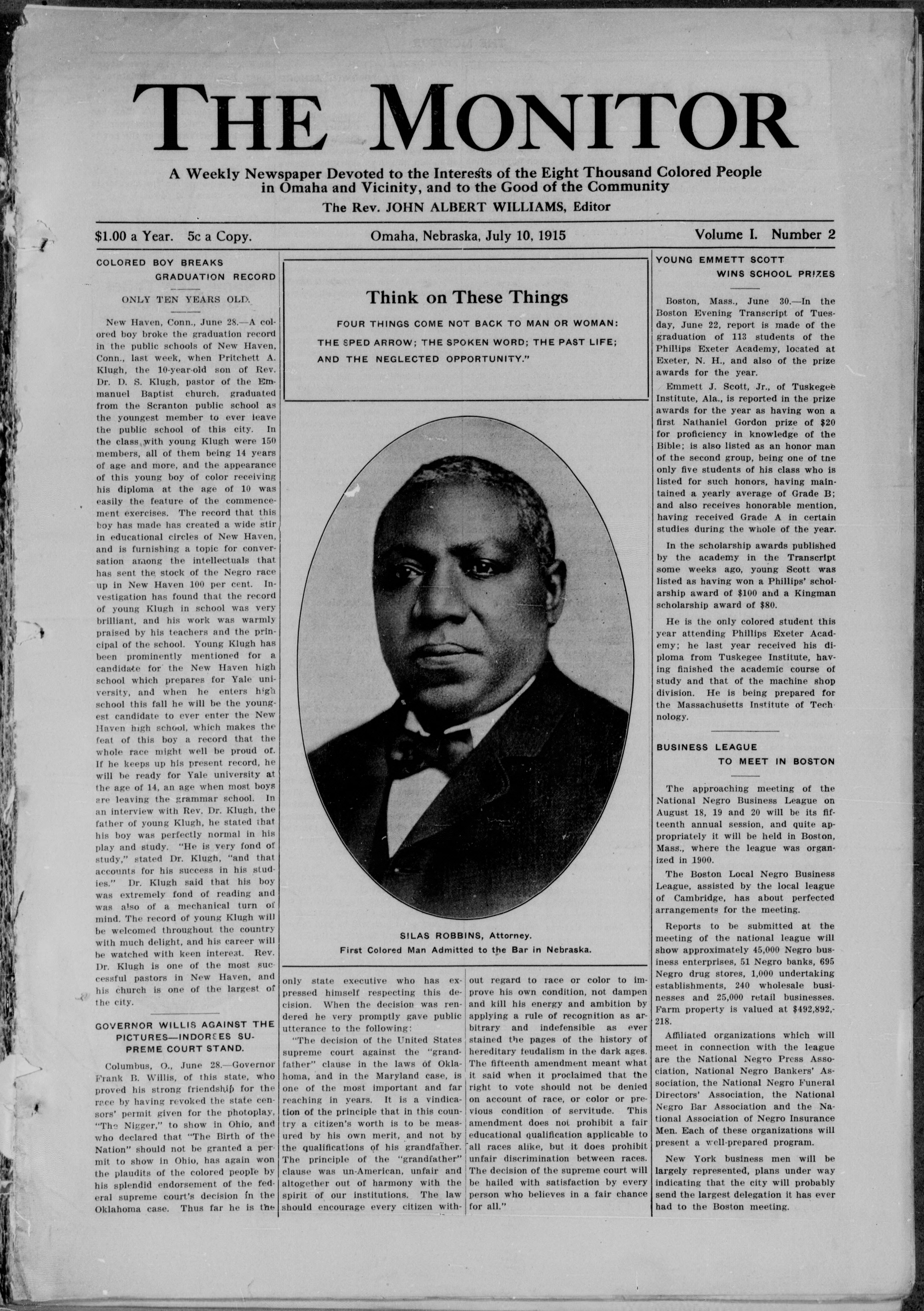
- Image of the Front Page of the Omaha Monitor from July 10, 1915
- Type: Weekly newspaper
- Publisher: John Albert Williams
- Editor: John Albert Williams
- City: Omaha, Nebraska
- Free online archives: https://nebnewspapers.unl.edu/lccn/00225879/

The Omaha Monitor, known as the Monitor for the bulk of its life, was an African American newspaper in Omaha, Nebraska. It ran issues from 1915 to 1929, and focused on the civic participation and racial equality of Omaha's black community. It was founded by John Albert Williams, who left the paper the year prior to its closure.

== Publication ==
The Monitor was founded in 1915 by John Albert Williams, an African American civic and religious leader and previous writer for the Enterprise, another black Omaha newspaper. He started the paper following the collapse of Enterprise, though an earlier version of it—the Mission Monitor—was in circulation in the late 1890s as a church periodical. The paper was national in its circulation.

The paper advocated for an expansion of civil rights for and civic participation by black people, which included stories devoted to church activities and economic agitation. Williams regularly pushed for his readers to gain a sense of racial pride, though in 1918, after he criticised their existence, he began accepting advertisements for products developed to distort natural Afro-textured hair and black skin. Civic participation was a feature of the Monitor, and the paper successfully rallied protests against a public showing of The Birth of a Nation; in one protest, however, they failed to stop or alter the showing, though the cinema's manager "agreed to print a statement about the good behavior of blacks in the cinema program", according to one historian. The paper was largely supportive of Marcus Garvey.

George Wells Parker was the paper's manager until 1920, when he left to found the New Era, a publication that was stronger in its calls for racial equality. Williams served as the paper's editor until 1928. The paper was given to George H.W. Bullock, who renamed it to the Omaha Monitor until its closure in early 1929.

== See also ==
- List of African-American newspapers in Nebraska
- African Americans in Omaha, Nebraska
- Beary, Michael J. (2001). Black bishop: Edward T. Demby and the struggle for racial equality in the Episcopal Church. University of Illinois Press. ISBN 9780252026188.
- Breaux, Richard M. (2012). "The new negro renaissance in Omaha and Lincoln, 1910–1940". In Glasrud, Bruce A.; Wintz, Cary D. (eds.). The Harlem Renaissance in the American West: The new negro's western experience. Routledge. ISBN 9780203805589.
- Paz, D.G. (1996). "The black press and the issues of race, politics, and culture on the Great Plains of Nebraska, 1865–1985". In Suggs, Henry Lewis (ed.). The black press in the middle west, 1865–1985. Greenwood Press.
- Chrisman, Robert (1991) [1973]. "Preface". In Vincent, Theodore G. (ed.). Voices of a black nation: Political journalism in the Harlem Renaissance. Africa World Press. ISBN 9780865432024.
