= List of African American newspapers in Missouri =

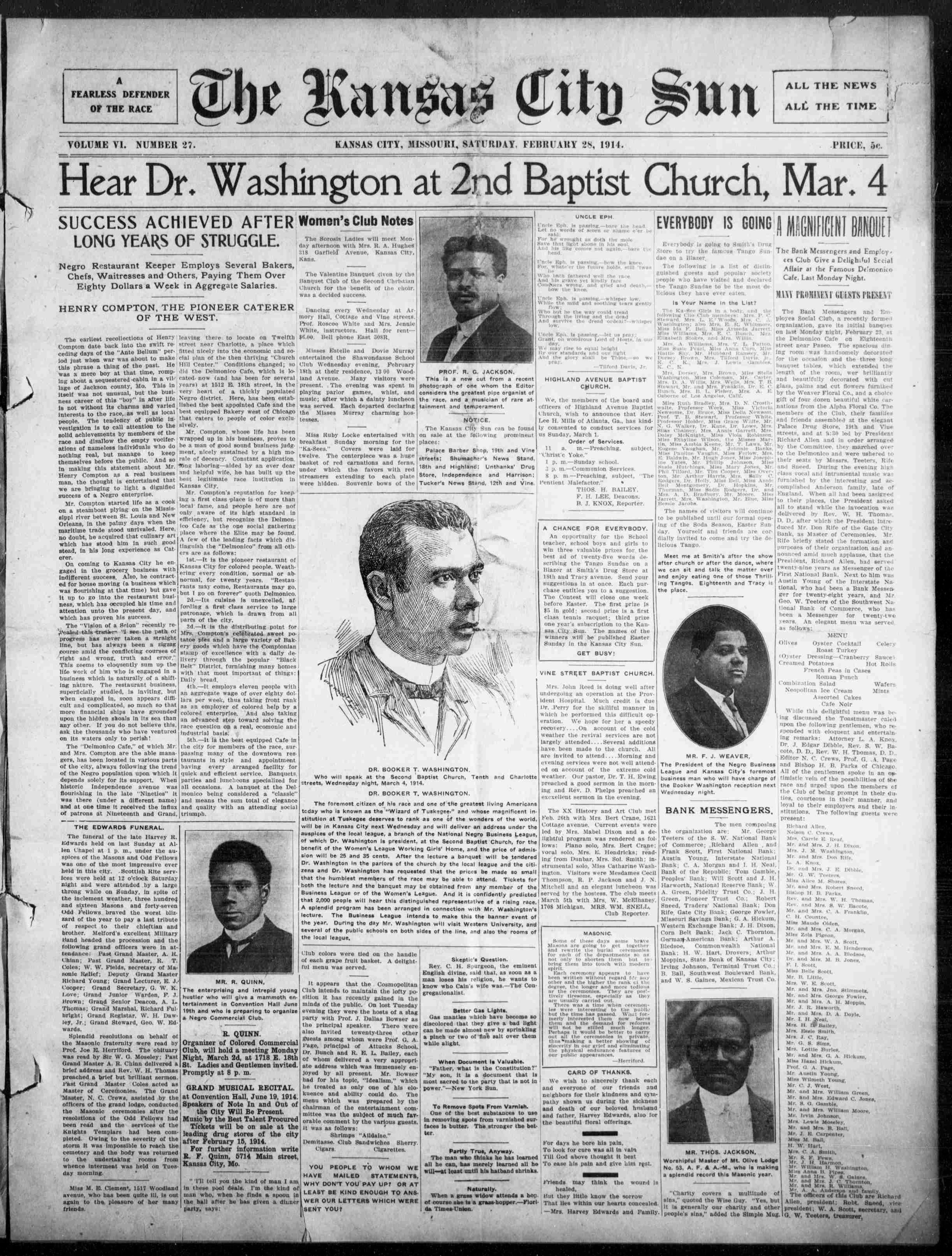
A front page of the Kansas City Sun from 1914.

This is a list of African American newspapers that have been published in the state of Missouri. It includes both current and historical newspapers.

The first known African American newspaper in Missouri was the Welcome Friend of St. Louis, which was in circulation by 1870. Yet the first surviving issue of any such newspaper dates from 20 years later in 1890, when the sole surviving issue of The American Negro of Springfield was published.

At least 64 African American newspapers have been published in Missouri over the years, although the actual number is likely to be much higher. Of that 64, 55 were established between 1875 and 1920. Most of the publishing activity has been concentrated in the St. Louis and Kansas City metropolitan areas, but many smaller cities and towns have had such newspapers as well.

Notable current African American newspapers in Missouri include the St. Louis Sentinel, St. Louis American, and Kansas City Globe.

== Newspapers ==
City	Title	Beginning	End	Frequency	Call numbers	Remarks
Caruthersville	The Anchor	1911 or 1912	1900s	Weekly	LCCN sn89066390; OCLC 19856062	Extant through at least 1921.; Published by J.W.D. Mayes.
Charleston	The Charleston Spokesman	1934	?	Weekly	LCCN sn89066839; OCLC 20109821	
Columbia / Jefferson City	The Professional World	1901	1920s or 1903?	Weekly	ISSN 2326-8549, 2326-8530; LCCN 2013218578, sn89066321; OCLC 828205812, 19566406	Available online; Edited by Rufus L. Logan.
Hannibal	Home Protective Record	1909	?	Weekly	LCCN sn89067609; OCLC 20842247	Published by Home Protective Association.; Extant through at least 1914.
Hannibal	Hannibal Register / Missouri State Register	1919	1941	Weekly	LCCN sn95063130; OCLC 33059789	Published by George H. Wright.
Joplin	The Joplin Advance	1895	1800s	Weekly	LCCN sn86063334; OCLC 13380812	Published by W.L. Yancey.
Joplin	Joplin-Springfield Uplift (1920s–1933) / Joplin Uplift	1926?	?	Weekly	Joplin-Springfield Uplift; OCLC 20280676; Joplin Uplift; LCCN sn89067253; OCLC 20280670	Published by Augustus Garvin Tutt.
Kansas City	Kansas City American	1928	1936	Weekly	LCCN sn90061553; OCLC 21244439	A Kansas edition was published as the Kansas American in Topeka.
Kansas City	The Call / Kansas City Call	1919	current	Weekly	The Call (1919–1922): LCCN sn90061476; OCLC 22351173; Kansas City Call (1922–1933): LCCN sn86063343; OCLC 2258887; The Call (1933-): LCCN 2001225008, sn87065699, sn90061475; OCLC 45795128, 16736831, 22351213	Official site
Kansas City	Greater Kansas City Community Challenger	1970s	?	Weekly	LCCN sn94055159; OCLC 30054652	Extant through at least 1976.
Kansas City	The Kansas City Globe	1972	current	Weekly	LCCN sn85067493; OCLC 13049347	Official site
Kansas City	The Inter-State Herald	1903	?	Weekly	LCCN sn89067286; OCLC 20398666	Published by H.R. Pinckney.
Kansas City	The Liberator	1901	1910	Weekly	LCCN sn89066765; OCLC 20257849	Published by H.R. Pinckney.
Kansas City	Missouri State Post	1986	?	Weekly	LCCN sn89067327; OCLC 20521647	Edited by Samuel Jordan.; Extant through at least 1996.; Published at times in Kansas City, Kansas.
Kansas City	Kansas City Observer	1896	1901	Weekly	LCCN sn83025495; OCLC 9529378, 2773822	Edited and published by L.C. Williams.
Kansas City	The Rising Son	1896	1918	Weekly	ISSN 2165-929X; LCCN 2014254302, sn83025494; OCLC 9529310, 2809495, 778033244	
Kansas City	The Kansas City Searchlight	1908	?	Weekly		Official newspaper of the Missouri United Brothers of Friendship and Sisters of the Mysterious Ten.
Kansas City	The Kansas City Sun	1908	1924	Weekly	ISSN 2166-8329; LCCN sn90061556; OCLC 21244408	Available online; Purchased by Nelson C. Crews in 1911.
Kansas City	The Kansas City Sun	1908	1924?	Weekly	LCCN sn90061556; OCLC 21244408	
Macon	Missouri Messenger	1894	1900	Weekly	LCCN sn83025493; OCLC 9529249, 2753702	Published by the Missouri Baptist State Convention.
Sedalia	The Sedalia Sun	1882	1880s	Weekly	LCCN sn93059993; OCLC 28201997	Published by A.H. Lee
Sedalia	The Sedalia Times	1893 or 1894	1905	Weekly	LCCN 2014254314, sn84020293; OCLC 2789539, 879304734, 10561127	Earliest Missouri African American newspaper of which an extended run of issues survives.
Sedalia	Sedalia Weekly Conservator	1903	1909	Weekly	ISSN 2166-8264; LCCN sn89067598; OCLC 20842253	Available online; Published at George R. Smith College "by William H. Huston and C. M. English until 1905 at which time Huston became the sole proprietor and publisher."
Sikeston	The Southeast Missouri World	1939	?	Weekly	LCCN sn89066838; OCLC 20109816	
Sikeston	Southern Sun	1954	1954	Twice monthly	LCCN sn90073067; OCLC 22287013	Edited by C. Coolidge Brown.
Springfield	The American Negro	1890	1890	Weekly	LCCN 2017225062, sn83025434; OCLC 995174447, 9467380, 2642092	Earliest Missouri African American newspaper of which any issues survive.
St. Louis	St. Louis Advance	1881 or 1887?	1908	Weekly	LCCN sn89067358; OCLC 20614966	Published by P.H. Murray
St. Louis	The African-American News World	1991?	?	Quarterly	OCLC 32329855	
St. Louis	The American Eagle	1894	1907	Weekly	LCCN sn83025433, sn84020143; OCLC 3853820, 10408010	Official newspaper of the Missouri Knights of Pythias.
St. Louis	The St. Louis American	1927	current	Weekly	LCCN sn89067344; OCLC 16015274	Official site
St. Louis	The St. Louis Argus	1912	?	Weekly	LCCN sn94081607, sn84025916; OCLC 32229724, 3860143, 8483538, 2934741	Available online (1915–1926)
St. Louis	St. Louis Call	1936?	?	Weekly		
St. Louis	St. Louis Clarion	1900s	1900s	Weekly	LCCN 2014254325; OCLC 664611404; ISSN 2578-7063; LCCN 2017234793; OCLC 46998429	Extant from 1920–1921.
St. Louis	Cooperative Citizen	1937?	?	Weekly		Edited by George L. Vaughn.
St. Louis	The Crusader	1963?	?	Weekly	LCCN sn99063220; OCLC 41609493	Extant from 1975–1977.
St. Louis	The Evening Whirl	1938	current	Weekly	LCCN sn89080096, sn86090538; OCLC 23714457, 15045378	Official Twitter feed
St. Louis	Limelight Magazine	1986	current	Monthly newspaper	OCLC 29391391	Official site
St. Louis	Negro World	1875	?			Frequently credited as the first African American newspaper in Missouri.; Published by J.W. Wilson.; In existence through at least 1887.
St. Louis	New National Baptist Voice	1915	current	Has varied from twice monthly to semiannual. Currently quarterly.	OCLC 1590292, 9661120, 32816821, 32816939, 35661885	Official site; Official organ of the National Baptist Convention.
St. Louis	The St. Louis Palladium / The Palladium (–1903)	1884	1911	Weekly	LCCN 2014254044, sn84020234, sn84020235; OCLC 879304840, 2775874, 10494741, 10494666	
St. Louis	People's Guide	1966?	?	Weekly	OCLC 32083677	
St. Louis	St. Louis Sentinel / St. Louis Metro Sentinel	1968		Weekly	ISSN 1546-4539; LCCN sn84025915, sn84025914; OCLC 10679783, 10679788	Founder and original editor and publisher: Howard B. Woods.
St. Louis	Welcome Friend	1870?	?			Published by local civic leader Charlton Tandy.
St. Louis	Western Messenger	?	1917	Weekly	LCCN sn92059015; OCLC 27061650	Official organ of the Missouri Negro Baptist Convention.
St. Louis	St. Louis Whirl-Examiner	1938	current	Weekly	LCCN sn89080096; OCLC 23714457	Published by Kevin G. Thomas

== See also ==
- List of African American newspapers and media outlets
- List of African American newspapers in Arkansas
- List of African American newspapers in Illinois
- List of African American newspapers in Iowa
- List of African American newspapers in Kansas
- List of African American newspapers in Nebraska
- List of African American newspapers in Oklahoma
- List of African American newspapers in Tennessee
- List of newspapers in Missouri

== Works cited ==
- Ayer Directory, Newspapers, Magazines, Trade Publications. 1922.
- Danky, James Philip; Hady, Maureen E., eds. (1998). African-American newspapers and periodicals : a national bibliography. Harvard University Press. ISBN 9780674007888.
- Pride, Armistead Scott; Wilson, Clint C. (1997). A History of the Black Press. Howard University Press. ISBN 9780882581927.
- Slavens, George Everett (1983). "Missouri". In Suggs, Henry Lewis (ed.). The Black Press in the South, 1865–1979. ISBN 9780313222443.
- Smith, Jessie Carney (2012). Black Firsts: 4,000 Ground-Breaking and Pioneering Historical Events. Visible Ink Press. ISBN 9781578593699.
