= List of African American newspapers in Wisconsin =

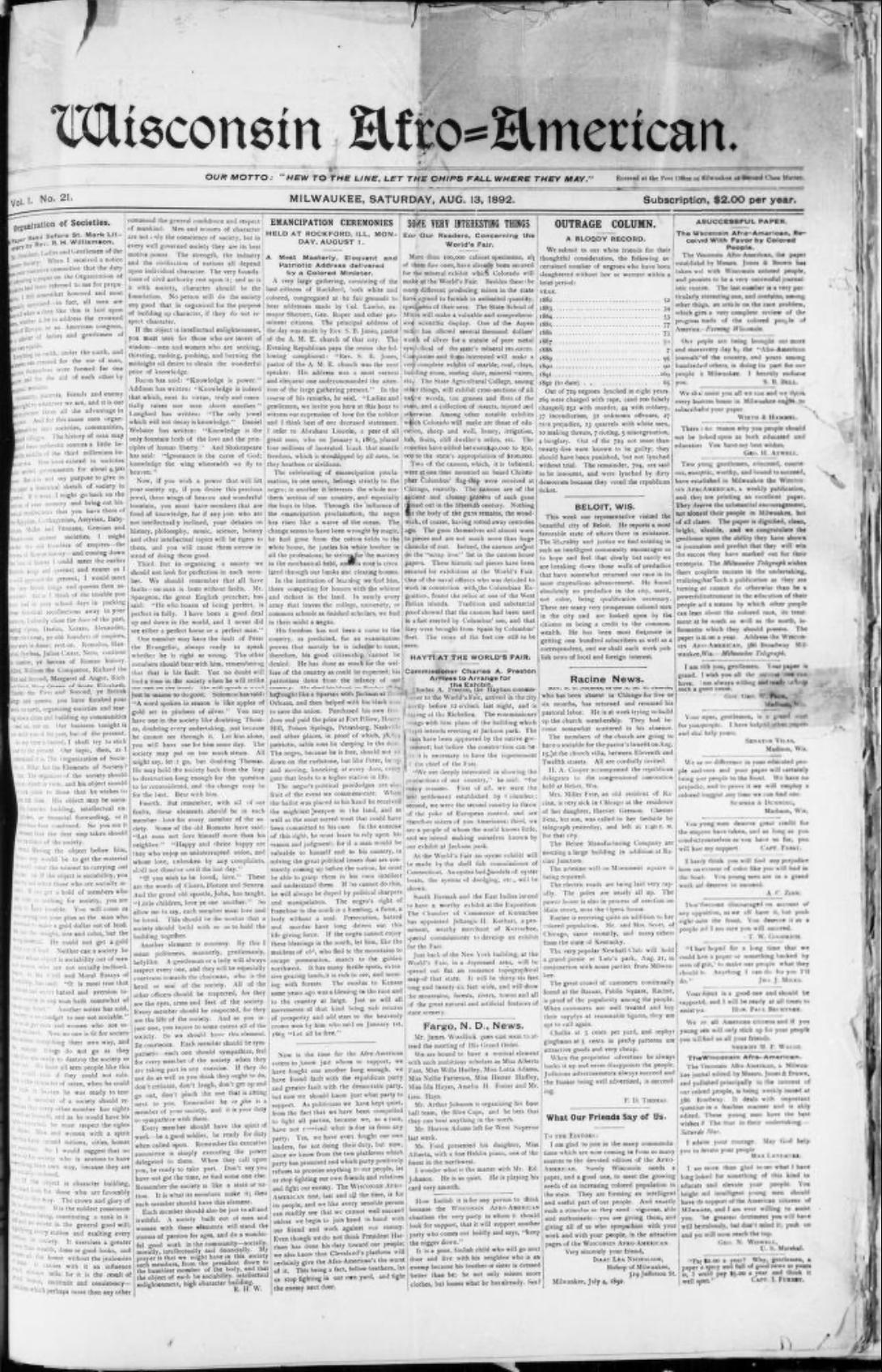
August 13, 1892 inaugural issue of the first Wisconsin black newspaper.

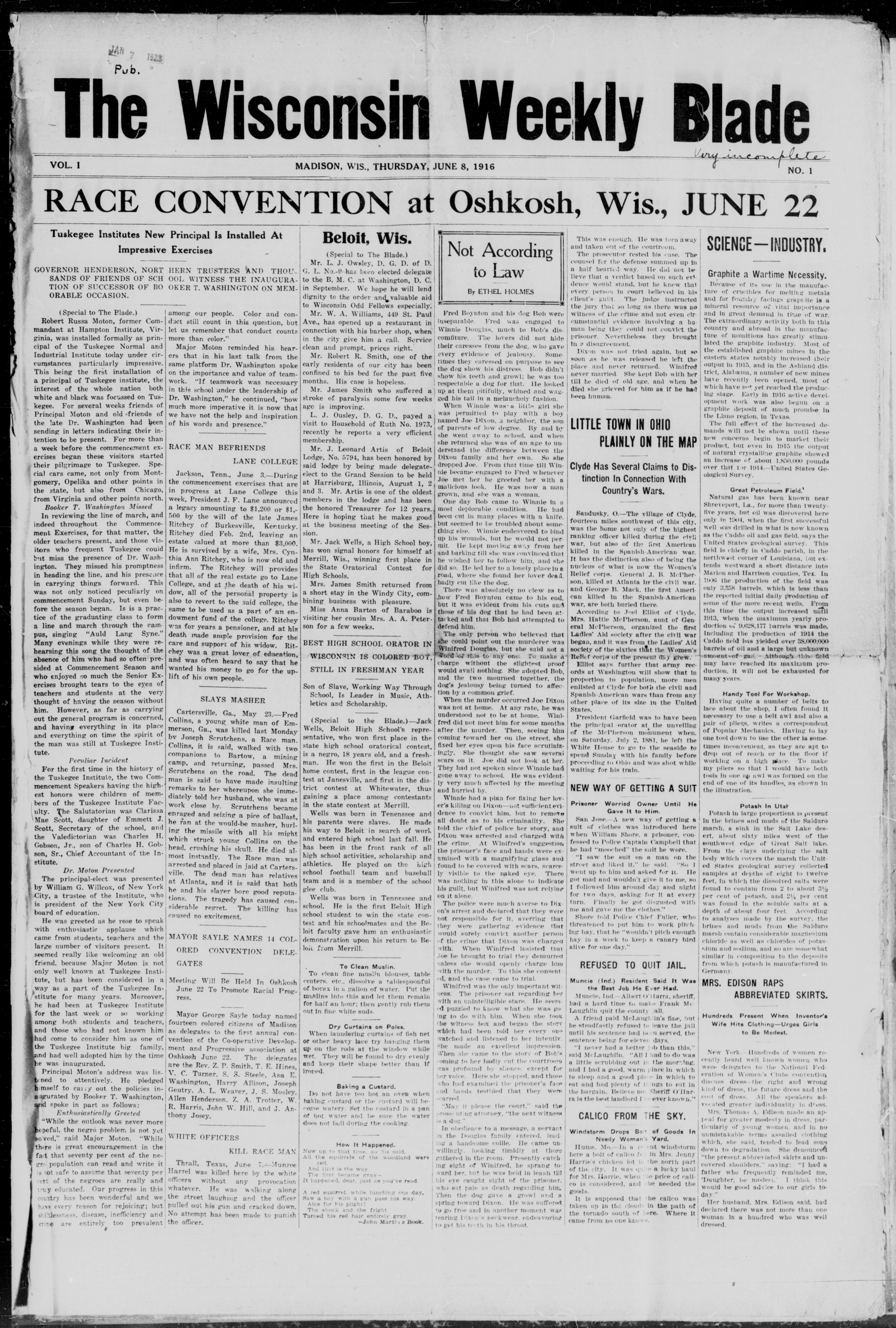
Front page of the Wisconsin Weekly Blade from June 1916.

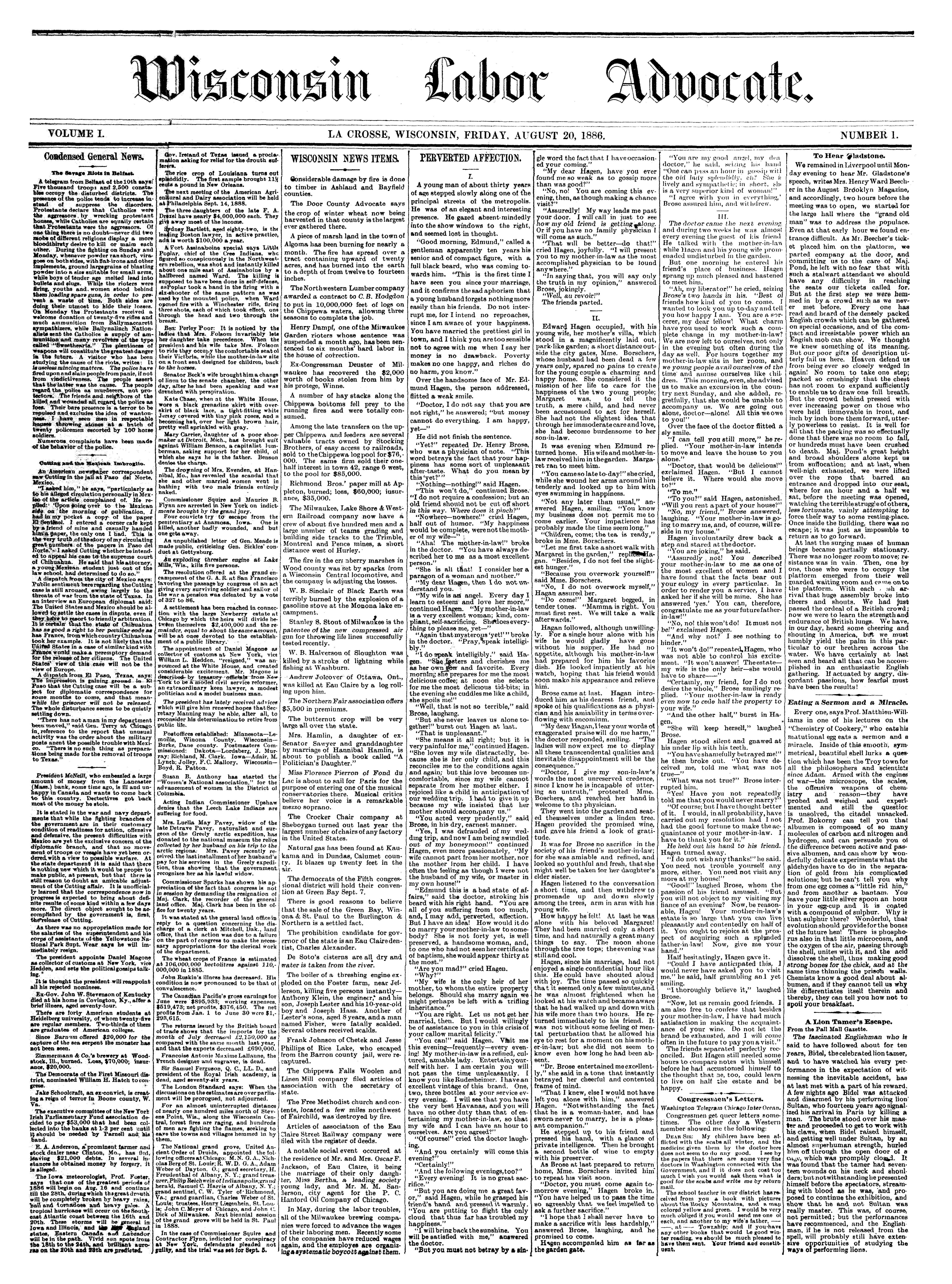
Inaugural issue of the Wisconsin Labor Advocate, August 1886.

This is a list of African American newspapers that have been published in Wisconsin. It includes both current and historical newspapers.

The total number of African Americans in Wisconsin before 1900 was less than 1,000, and the growth of Wisconsin's African American newspapers was commensurately delayed.

The first such newspaper in Wisconsin is generally considered the Wisconsin Afro-American, which George A. Brown (son of Bishop John Mifflin Brown) and Thomas H. Jones launched in 1892.

The first newspaper published by an African American in Wisconsin was launched several years before either: George Edwin Taylor published the Wisconsin Labor Advocate for workers of all races from 1886 to 1887.

Notable African American newspapers in Wisconsin today include The Madison Times, The Milwaukee Courier, The Milwaukee Times, and The Milwaukee Community Journal.

== Newspapers ==
City	Title	Beginning	End	Frequency	Call numbers	Remarks
Beloit	Beloit Chronicle	1981	1982	Irregular	LCCN sn85041090; OCLC 12339834	Billed as "Beloit's only minority newspaper."; Also served nearby Rockford, Illinois.; Published by Eugene Relerford.
Beloit	Soul City Courier	1976	?	Biweekly	ISSN 2639-3506, 2639-3492; LCCN 2014254330, sn85041151; OCLC 664611394, 12545129	Extant through at least 1977.
Gratiot	The Gratiot Reporter	1903	1915	Weekly	ISSN 2574-7843; LCCN sn84024844; OCLC 11383996	
Green Bay	Green Bay Spectator	1851	1852	Weekly	ISSN 2574-7835; LCCN sn84025597; OCLC 11424007	
La Crosse	Wisconsin Labor Advocate	1886	1888	Weekly	ISSN 2640-5830; LCCN 2013254378, 2017235084; OCLC 60494645, 10645340	Free online archive
Madison	Mid-West Observer	1980	1980?	Monthly newspaper	OCLC 12068465	Published by Glenn E. Sturgis.
Madison	The Madison Sun	1966	1966	Twice monthly	LCCN sn84025849; OCLC 10437852	Published by Lawrence Saunders.
Madison	The Madison Times	1990	current	Weekly	LCCN sn89080089; OCLC 22615221	Official site; Published and edited by Betty Franklin Hammonds.
Madison	Wisconsin Free Press	1984	?	Twice monthly or biweekly	LCCN 2013254377; OCLC 850973708, 16969188	Sold to The Milwaukee Times in 1990, folded into The Madison Times.
Madison	The Wisconsin Weekly Blade	1916	1925 or 1922	Weekly	LCCN sn84025842; OCLC 10462416	First Black newspaper in Madison. Founder J. Anthony Josey recognized posthumously in 1998.: Free online archive
Milwaukee	The Beacon	1953	1953	Weekly	OCLC 35979157	Published by Lawrence Saunders.; Continued as The Rocket.
Milwaukee / Beloit	Chronicle / Beloit Chronicle	1981		Irregular	LCCN sn85041090, sn85041091; OCLC 12339834, 12339909	
Milwaukee	The Communicator News	1984		Weekly	LCCN sn88086016; OCLC 17448535	
Milwaukee	The Milwaukee Community Journal	1975	current	Twice weekly or weekly	LCCN sn84025860; OCLC 8124770	Official site; Published by Patricia O'Flynn Thomas.
Milwaukee	The Milwaukee Community Journal: Daily City Edition	1987	1989	Daily (except weekends and holidays)	OCLC 25644557	Published by Patricia O'Flynn Thomas.
Milwaukee	Milwaukee Courier	1964	current	Weekly	ISSN 0026-4350; LCCN sn78005245; OCLC 4166496	Official site
Milwaukee	The Milwaukee Defender	1956 or 1957	1960	Weekly	LCCN 2013254319, sn89080118; OCLC 664611321, 26998090	Published by Mary Ellen Shadd.; Milwaukee affiliate of the Chicago Defender.; Attacked and "literally run out of town" by Milwaukee's white business community in retaliation for its militant reporting.
Milwaukee	The Milwaukee Gazette	1960	1961	Weekly	LCCN sn84025848; OCLC 10437772	"A nonpartisan paper for all the people."; Published by LeRoy G. White
Milwaukee	The Milwaukee Globe	1945 or 1948	1949	Weekly	LCCN sn84025847; OCLC 10435818	Edited by L. J. Saunders.
Milwaukee	National Defender And Sun	1905	1923	Weekly	LCCN sn83025598; OCLC 9647337	Moved to Gary, Indiana in 1910s.
Milwaukee	The Northwest 76er / MCJ Northwest 76er	1989? or 1990	?	Weekly	LCCN sn89080070; OCLC 22444064	Published by Patricia O'Flynn Thomas.; Subsidiary of Milwaukee Community Journal
Milwaukee	The Northwestern Recorder	1892	1893	Monthly newspaper, weekly from August 1892 to January 1893	LCCN sn84025844, sn84025845; OCLC 10435733, 2776073, 10435741, 2771151	Succeeded by Wisconsin Afro-American.
Milwaukee	Racine Courier / Racine Star (1971–1972) / Racine Star News (1970–1971) / Racine Star Times (1972–1976)	1970 or 1976	1992	Monthly or weekly	LCCN 2014254307, sn84025858, sn84025859, sn84025850, sn84025851; OCLC 10470013, 10469986, 10462475	Published in Milwaukee but serving the Racine-Kenosha area.; "A division of the Racine Star Times, Inc."
Milwaukee	The Rocket	1953	1953	Weekly	OCLC 35979236	
Milwaukee	The Milwaukee Sepian	1951	1951	Weekly	LCCN sn84025846; OCLC 10435777	Edited by Hosea N. Doxey.
Milwaukee	Soul City Times	1968	1971	Weekly	ISSN 2644-187X, 2644-1888; LCCN 2014254329, 2019201081; OCLC 664611395, 37459048	Merged into The Milwaukee Star.
Milwaukee	The Milwaukee Star (1963–1968, 1976–2005) / Greater Milwaukee Star / Your Greater Milwaukee Star / Milwaukee Star-Times (1971–1976)	1961	2005	Weekly	LCCN sn84025853, sn84025854, sn84025855, sn84025856, sn84025857; OCLC 10470051, 10470035, 10470032, 10470029, 6706692	The Star Times name of the 1970s reflected the absorption of the Soul City Times.
Milwaukee	The Milwaukee Times	1981	current	Weekly	OCLC 14402172	Official site
Milwaukee	Wisconsin Afro-American	1892	1892	Weekly	ISSN 2643-3818, 2643-3826; LCCN 2013254375, sn84025844; OCLC 665098926, 10435733	Reported closely on the activity of William T. Green as delegate to the state Republican convention.; Status as an African American newspaper is disputed.
Milwaukee	Wisconsin Enterprise-Blade / Wisconsin Weekly Blade (1916–1922)	1916	1943?	Weekly	LCCN sn84025843; OCLC 10462422	
Milwaukee	The Wisconsin Weekly Advocate	1898	1915	Weekly	LCCN 2013254379, sn84025861; OCLC 850981728, 10509898, 2775259	Extant through at least 1907.
Racine	The Communicator News	1984	2013?	Bimonthly newspaper	LCCN sn88086016; OCLC 17448535	Official site; "Serving Racine, Kenosha and the North Shore communities."
Racine	The Racine Community Chronicle	1989	?	Biweekly	OCLC 27859307	
Racine	The Racine Insider News	1992		Bimonthly newspaper		Published by Kenneth Lumpkin.; Extant through at least 1995.
Racine	Racine Star News	1970	1971	Weekly	LCCN 2013254308; OCLC 844235537	
Racine	Racine Star	1971	1972	Weekly	LCCN 2013254307; OCLC 844223253	"Supplement to the Greater Milwaukee Star serving the Racine-Kenosha area."

== See also ==
- List of African American newspapers and media outlets
- List of African American newspapers in Illinois
- List of African American newspapers in Iowa
- List of African American newspapers in Michigan
- List of African American newspapers in Minnesota
- List of newspapers in Wisconsin

== Works cited ==
- Danky, James Philip; Hady, Maureen E., eds. (1998). African-American newspapers and periodicals: a national bibliography. Harvard University Press. ISBN 9780674007888.
- McBride, Genevieve G. (1996). Suggs, Henry Lewis (ed.). The Progress of "Race Men" and "Colored Women" in the Black Press in Wisconsin, 1892-1985. Greenwood Press. ISBN 9780313255793.
- Pride, Armistead Scott; Wilson, Clint C. (1997). A History of the Black Press. Howard University Press. ISBN 9780882581927.
- Smith, Jessie Carney (2012). Black Firsts: 4,000 Ground-Breaking and Pioneering Historical Events. Visible Ink Press. ISBN 9781578593699.
