= African Americans in Illinois =

Total population
- 2.0 million (2020)

Regions with significant populations
- Chicagoland, Metro East, Peoria, Rockford, rural counties in far Southern Illinois

Languages
- Inland Northern American English, African-American English, African American Vernacular English, African languages, Haitian Creole, Louisiana Creole

Religion
- Black Protestant

African Americans have significantly contributed to the history, culture, and development of Illinois since the early 18th century. The African American presence dates back to the French colonial era where the French brought black slaves to the U.S. state of Illinois early in its history, and spans periods of slavery, migration, civil rights movement, and more. Contributions span over politics, business, arts, and social justice sectors shaping the overall cultural landscape of Illinois.

During and between the two World Wars, blacks began leaving states in the South for Illinois and other states in the north. The Great Migration increased Illinois’ black population by 81% from 1920 to 1930. Many African Americans would reside in Chicago where they would build communities in the South and West sides of Chicago, creating churches, businesses, community organizations, and more to survive and sustain themselves in the segregated city.

== Population ==
In the 2020 Census, 1,808,271 Illinois residents were identified as African American (of the total 12,812,508). In 4 of the state's 102 counties, African Americans make up more than 20% of the population: Alexander (30.9%), St. Clair (29.7%), Pulaski (28.2%), and Cook (22.9%). African Americans in the seven counties of Cook (1,205,824), Will (80,979), St. Clair (76,564), Lake (49,035), DuPage (45,516), Winnebago (39,159), and Peoria (34,015) make up more than 84% of all African Americans in the state.

== Early history ==
The first Africans arrived in Illinois as slaves in 1720 when it was still under rule of the French colony of Louisiana. Frenchman Philippe Renault brought slaves to work in salt mines and by 1763, the slave population had grown to six hundred in Illinois.

=== Slavery and emancipation ===
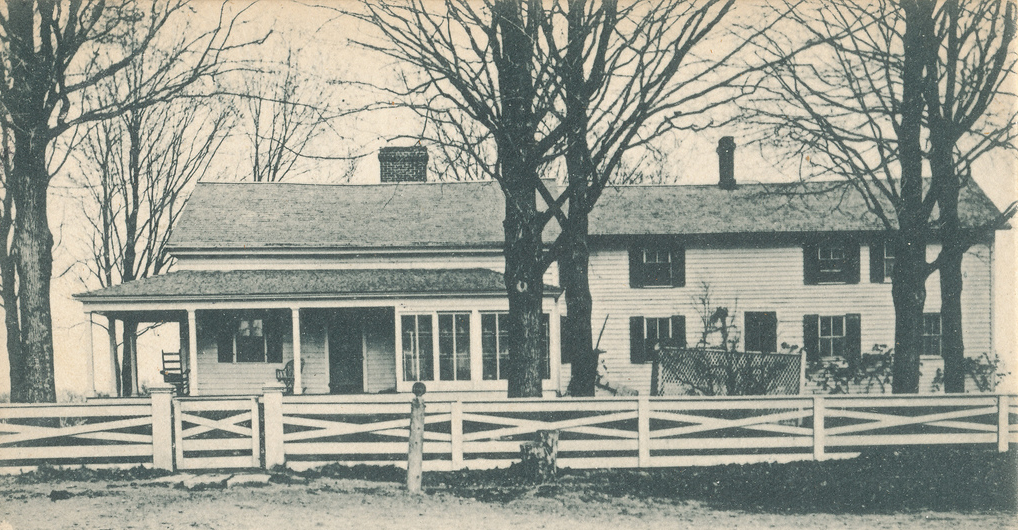
Postcard of the Owen Lovejoy homestead, a stop on the Underground Railroad.

In 1787, Illinois became part of the Northwest Territory where the Northwest Ordinance prohibited the importation of slaves. Illinois was admitted as a free state in 1818, but the constitution of 1818 allowed slave owners to keep their current slaves and for limited slavery in the salt mines. However, black people that were free faced major restrictions under the Black Codes limiting their rights and threatening them to be sold.

Despite these challenges, black communities emerged in Illinois, particularly in Lovejoy (present day Brooklyn, IL) and Alton which served as crucial stops on the Underground Railroad. The Illinois River and the surrounding areas would also become part of the route for escaped slaves heading to Canada.

== The 20th century ==
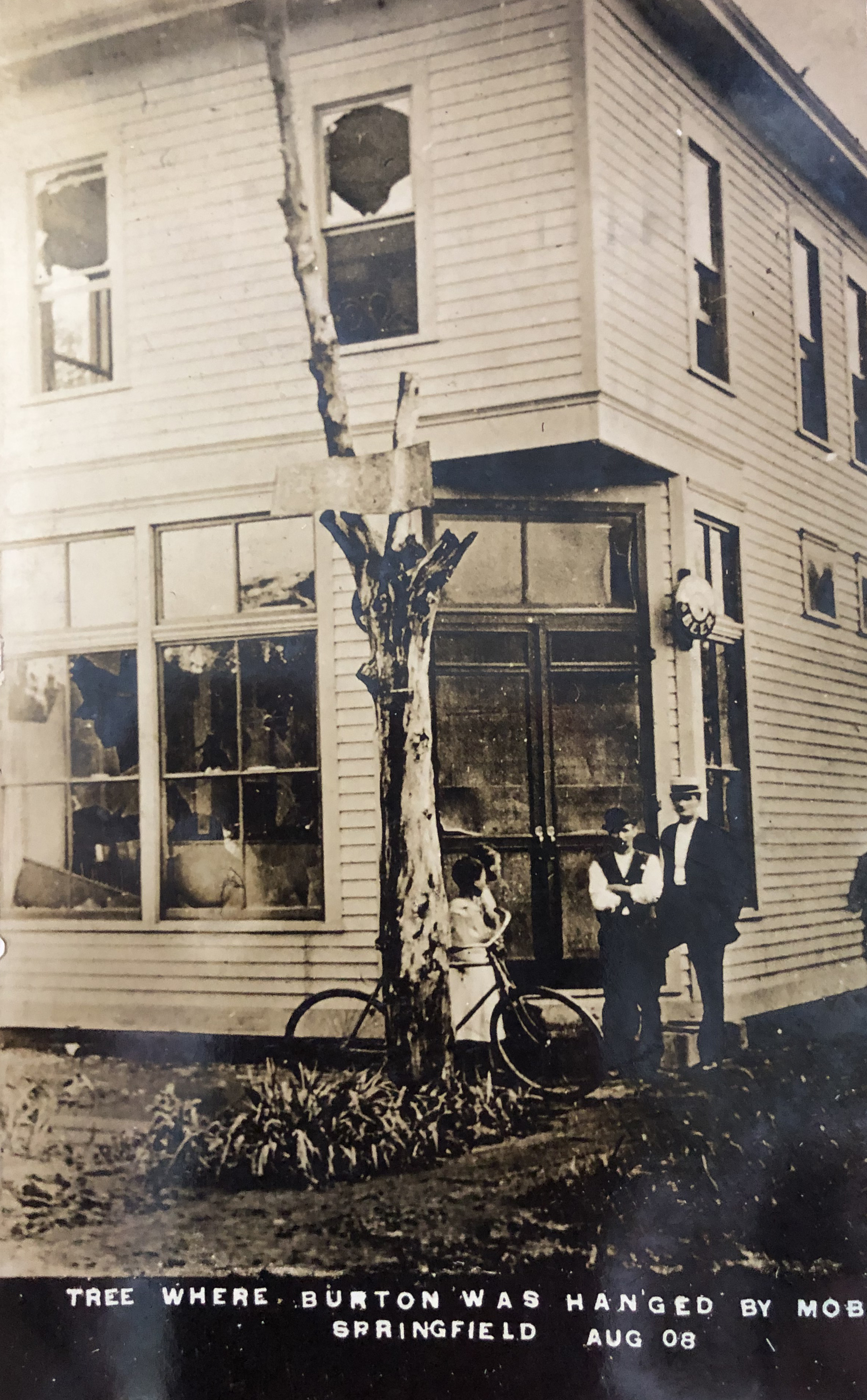
Postcard of the tree where Scott Burton was hanged.

=== 1908 Springfield Race Riot ===
The 1908 Springfield Race Riot started on the evening of August 14, 1908 started a violent race war in the capital city of Springfield that would be deemed a dark part of history for Illinois, but would lead to the creation of the National Association for the Advancement of Colored People (NAACP). A mob of around 5,000 white Americans would gather at the city jail demanding the police hand over two African American men, George Richardson accused of raping a white woman and Joe James accused of murdering a white man. The police would secretly transport these men to Bloomington for their safety, and when the mob learned of this, they rioted.

The mob spent the next 2 days going to black neighborhoods looting and destroying their businesses, beating them on the streets, burning homes, and even lynching two men, Scott Burton and William Donnegan. Illinois militia would arrive in Springfield halting some of the violent acts until enough had arrived on August 6 to fully put a stop to all attacks. About two thousand Black people were driven out of Springfield due to the riots.

A direct result of this violence, white liberals and activists, including Mary White Ovington, and concerned African Americans including W.E.B Du Bois, Ida B. Wells-Barnett, and Mary Church Terrell, would meet to discuss the racism in America. This would form the NAACP on February 12, 1909.

=== The Great Migration ===
During the 20th century, the Great Migration significantly impacted Illinois’ demographics with a surge in the African American population, particularly in Chicago and the north. From 1916 to 1970, hundreds of thousands of African Americans migrated from the Jim Crow South for more industrial opportunities in the North. This created an influx that contributed to the population growth of African Americans in Illinois from 2% to 33% by 1970 and transformed the Black population in Illinois to predominantly urban.

While Illinois offered freedom from legally sanctioned discrimination, African Americans still faced racial discrimination in every area of life such as housing, education, and other employment opportunities. It was not until World War I that African American men were offered jobs in the factories, and temporarily offered domestic work to the women.

=== Civil Rights Movement ===
Following World War II, President Harry S. Truman desegregated the U.S. military, but society still had not caught up yet. This led to many African Americans all over the country, but mainly based in the South, still fighting for their rights resulting in the decision in Brown v. The Board of Education, led by the NAACP, and eventually the Civil Rights Act of 1964 as well.

The fight for equality was no different in Illinois. While Chicago was leaning more towards antislavery, especially through the Illinois Civil Rights Act of 1885, outside of the Black communities, termed the Black Belt, African Americans in Chicago were still heavily discriminated against. The Chicago branch of the NAACP was founded in 1910 due to increased tension in race relations, and activism was at an all-time high during the Great Depression. In the early 1960s, the Coordinating Council of Community Organizations (CCCO) emerged to help Black parents in their protests against the discrimination in the education system and the policies of Chicago superintendent, Benjamin Willis. Dr. Martin Luther King Jr visited Illinois on numerous occasions to lead and address the housing segregation, education, and hiring discrimination in Chicago. In September 1965, CCCO joined forces with King and his Southern Christian Leadership Conference (SCLC) to launch the Chicago Freedom Movement looking to end slums and overall bring racial justice to the city. The Chicago Freedom Movement focused on homeownership, as about 90% of African Americans had to buy their homes using a “contract sale”, resulting in thousands of dollars of debt and often poverty as well. This was one of the major factors that produced the passage of the Fair Housing Act in 1968. Along with housing discrimination, in 1966 SCLC, with leadership from Rev. Jesse Jackson, launched Operation Breadbasket in Chicago: an organization dedicated to bettering the economic conditions of the Black communities.

=== Politics ===
Despite historical barriers, the Civil Rights movement had a profound impact on the political landscape for African Americans in Illinois. The movement helped to increase voter registration, and Black citizens brought greater pressure for the elected officials to make change and address their concerns. In this period, a new generation of political leaders emerged, shaping the political agenda and advocating for the betterment of their communities. However, it did not take the Civil Rights Movement to introduce an African American politician. In 1929, Oscar DePriest became the first African American congressman in the 20th century outside of the south, and ever since then the 1st Congressional District has consistently elected Black congressmen.

Two of the most influential African American congressmen came right after DePriest, Arthur W. Mitchell and William L. Dawson. Mitchell was the first African American Democrat to be elected to Congress and was the only African American in Congress during his congressional career. Mitchell introduced legislation against lynching and discrimination and condemned politicians preferring the Axis Powers over giving African Americans any rights. William L. Dawson was elected after Mitchell and focused on improving the lives of African Americans during his time. Notably, Dawson is credited with defeating the Winstead Amendment.

== Achievements ==
Since the early 20th century, many prominent African American politicians have called Illinois home. Illinois has elected 17 African Americans to the House of Representatives and three African American Senators, the most of any state.

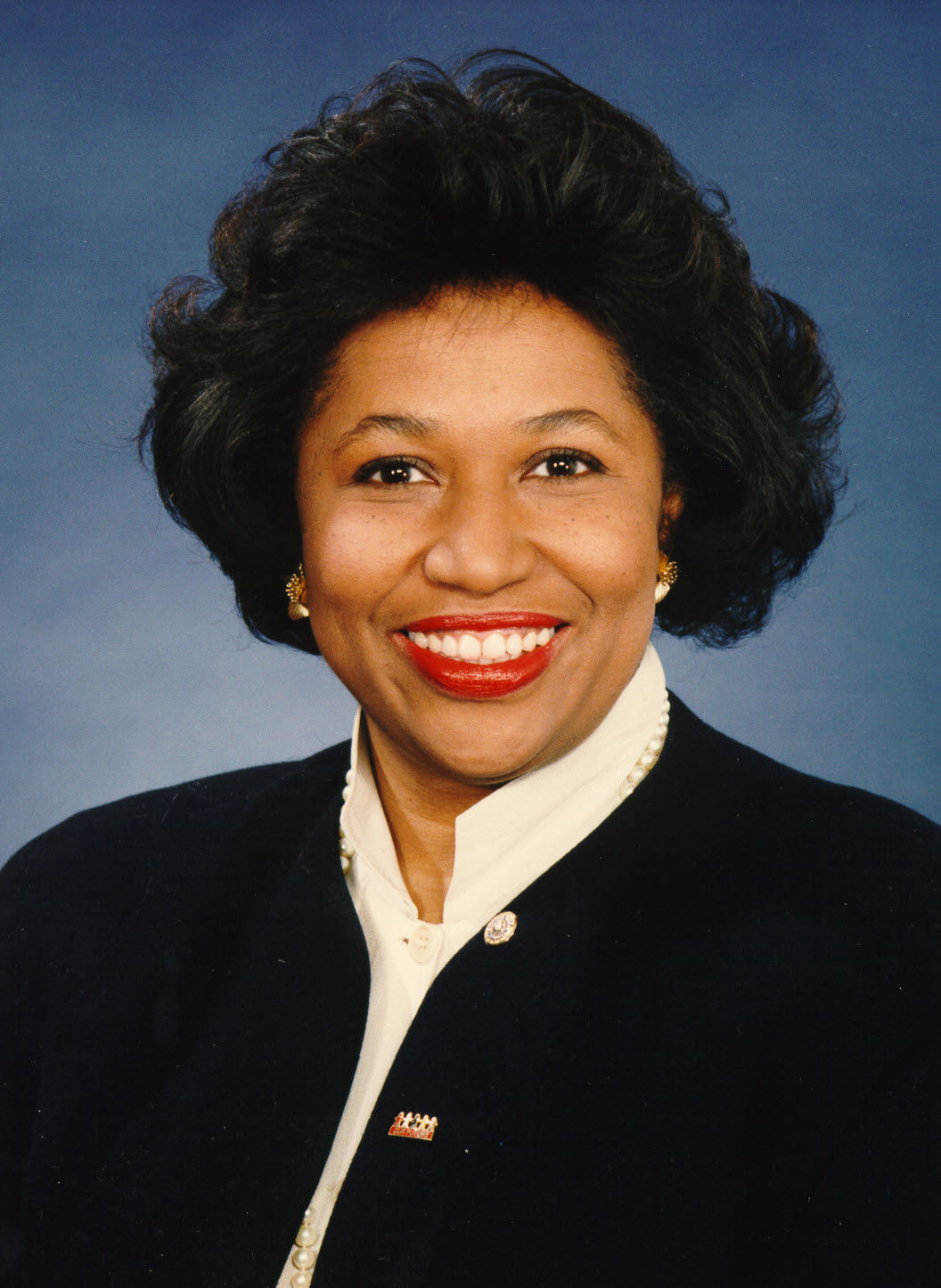
Senator Carol Moseley Braun, 1993.

Carol Moseley Braun was the first African American woman and Democratic African American to be elected to the Senate from Illinois. Barack Obama was the first African American to be elected United States President in 2009.

== Contemporary ==
Despite progress, African Americans have continued to face challenges such as economic disparities, racial tensions, and more. Demographic shifts have also recently seen many African Americans leaving Illinois for the south.

African Americans have played a significant role in Illinois history, from the era of slavery to the present day, contributing to the state's development and continuing to influence its culture, society, and efforts toward equality.

== Legacy and notable figures ==
- Jean Baptiste Pointe DuSable
- John Jones
- Elijah P. Lovejoy
- Carter G. Woodson
- Dorothy Height
- Gwendolyn Brooks
- Etta James
- Richard Wright
- Muhammad Ali
- Michelle Obama
- Harold Washington
- Emmett Till
- Louis Armstrong
- Muddy Waters
- Adelbert H. Roberts
- Floy Clements
- Lorraine Hansberry

== See also ==
- History of African Americans in Chicago
- History of slavery in Illinois
- List of African American newspapers in Illinois
- History of Illinois
- History of African Americans in Georgia
- History of African Americans in Louisiana
- Racial Unrest in Cairo, IL
- Second Great Migration
- List of African American Newspapers in Illinois
- List of Historic African American Places in Washington, D.C
