= Kansas City Sun =

Kansas City newspaper serving African-American community

The Kansas City Sun
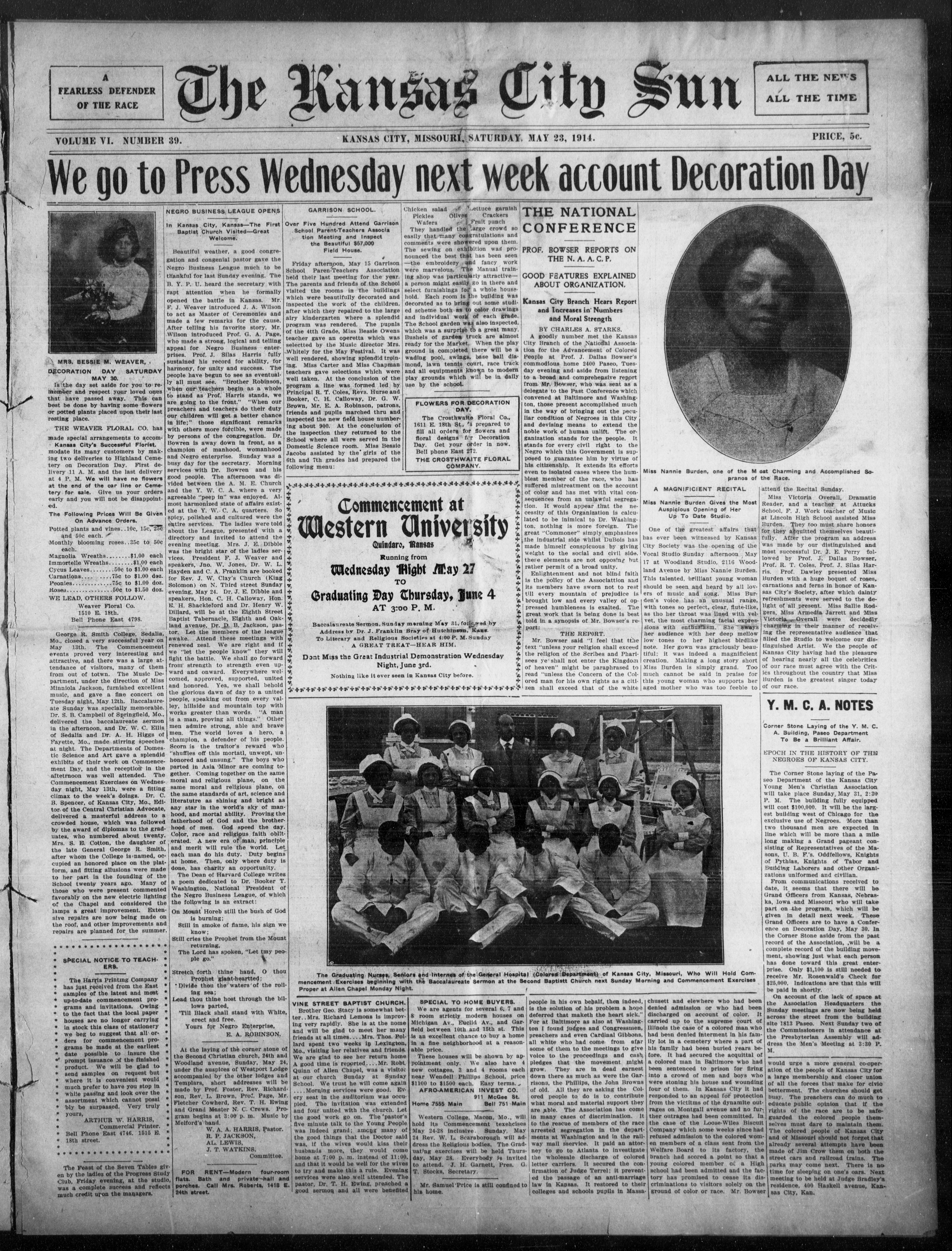
- May 23, 1914 front page
- Founded: 1908
- Ceased publication: 1924
- City: Kansas City, Missouri

The Kansas City Sun was a newspaper for the African American community in Kansas City, Missouri. A weekly, it was published from 1908 until 1924.

== History ==
The Sun was one of the city's three weeklies serving the Black community in the city in the early 20th century along with Chester Arthur Franklin's The Call and William T. Washington's competing paper the Rising Son . Nelson C. Crews (1866 - 1923) purchased the paper in 1911 used its editorials for advocacy in their roles as community advocates during their ten-year ownership. Of the other two weeklies, the Sun's rivalry with Rising Son was the strongest until Crews bought it out in 1914 following a decline in the Son's influence. Crews and Charleton H. Tandy of the St. Louis Palladium newspaper testified at a hearing of the Missouri House of Representatives about a bill which would require the "separation of the races" on public transportation. Crews advocated for a Kansas City hospital staffed by African Americans that would serve the African American community in the segregated city.
