= List of African American newspapers in Minnesota =

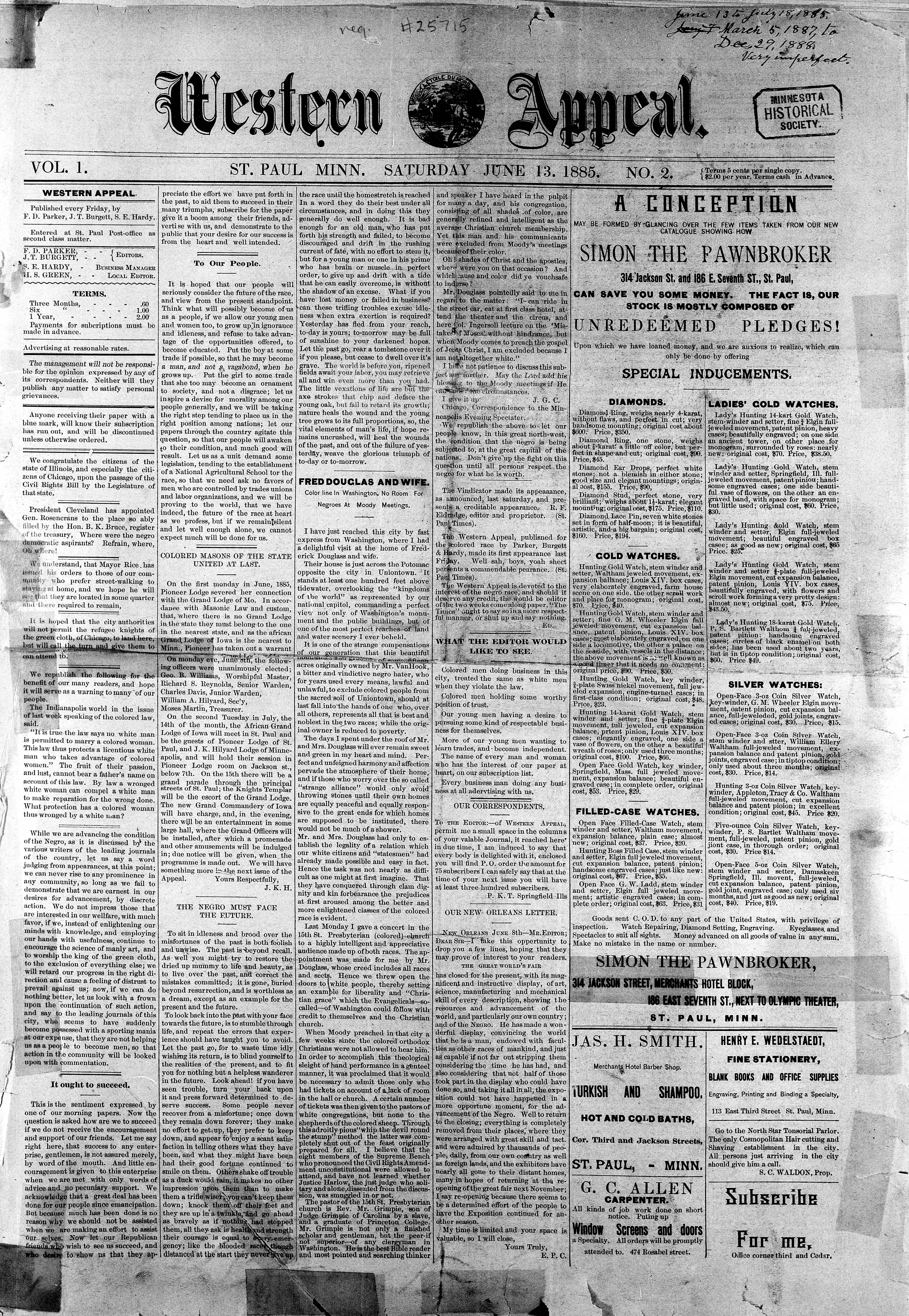
Front page of the Western Appeal from June 13, 1885.

This is a list of African American newspapers that have been published in the state of Minnesota. It includes both current and historical newspapers. The first such newspaper published in Minnesota was the Western Appeal, established in 1885. African American newspapers currently published in Minnesota include Insight News and the Minnesota Spokesman-Recorder.

== Newspapers ==
City	Title	Beginning	End	Frequency	Call numbers	Remarks
Minneapolis and Saint Paul	Afro-American Advance / The Afro-American Advance	1899	1905	Weekly	LCCN 2011254021, sn86058061; OCLC 707541811, 13353098	Available online; Formed by merger of Colored Citizen and Twin-City American.
Saint Paul	Afro-Independent	1888	?	Weekly	LCCN sn86058058; OCLC 13351837	Available online; Edited by Charles S. Sweed.
Minneapolis	The Twin-City American	1899	1899	Weekly	LCCN sn86058062; OCLC 13353065	Available online; Published by Jay Moses Griffin.; Merged with the Colored Citizen to form the Afro-American Advance.
Saint Paul	Western Appeal / Appeal (1889–1924)	1885	1924	Weekly	ISSN 2163-7083; LCCN sn83016811, 2013254362; OCLC 10153837, 732734928	Available online (Western Appeal); Available online (Appeal)
Minneapolis	The Banner	1962	1963?	Weekly	LCCN sn90059706; OCLC 21569346	Published by Edwin A. Hayden.
Minneapolis	The Colored Citizen	1899	1899	Weekly		No issues survive.; Merged with the Twin City American to form the Afro-American Advance in 1899.
Minneapolis	Twin Cities Courier	1966	1986	Weekly	ISSN 0300-6603; LCCN sn7804217; OCLC 1343402	Published by Mary J. Kyle.
Saint Paul	The St. Paul Echo	1925	1927	Weekly	LCCN sn90059272, sn94081608; OCLC 1645574, 32229718	Available online
Saint Paul	Globe News	1939	?	Weekly	LCCN sn90059293; OCLC 21465595	
Saint Paul	The Grand Selby Digest	1971	?	Monthly newspaper	LCCN sn90059298; OCLC 23612957	"Serving the Summit-University, Crocus Hill, Lexington-Hamline Communities."; Published by Eloise Adams.
Saint Paul	The Twin City Guardian	1895	1923	Weekly	LCCN sn83045427; OCLC 1767883	Available online; Published by Jacob R. Steiner.
Saint Paul	Insight / Insight News	1964?	current	Weekly	ISSN 1535-4679; LCCN 2001215064; OCLC 26238177, 29579855, 26238267	Official site; Issues available online; Multiple local editions published.
Minneapolis	Twin City Leader or Twin-City Leader	1940	1941	Weekly	LCCN sn90060425; OCLC 1767884	
Minneapolis	Twin-City Herald	1927	1940	Weekly	LCCN sn90060227; OCLC 1623725	Edited by J.E. Perry.
Minneapolis	The Minnesota Messenger / The Minneapolis Messenger (1921–1922)	1922	1924	Weekly	LCCN sn90060138, sn90060139; OCLC 1758214, 22601503	Published by Charles Sumner Smith and Hamlet B. Rowe.
Minneapolis	The National Advocate	1916	1924?	Weekly	LCCN sn90060154; OCLC 1759021	Available online; Published by R.B. Montgomery.
Saint Paul	The Negro World	1892	1900s	Weekly	LCCN 2013254337, sn86058057; OCLC 846507878, 13351538	Available online
Minneapolis and Saint Paul	The Negro World	1892	?	Weekly	LCCN sn86058057; OCLC 13351538	Published by Joseph Houser.
Minneapolis and Saint Paul	Northwest Monitor	1930	1931	Weekly	LCCN sn90060180; OCLC 22283057	Published by William F. Helm.
Saint Paul	The Northwestern Bulletin	1922	1924	Weekly	LCCN sn90060931; OCLC 1764889	Available online
Saint Paul	The Northwestern Bulletin-Appeal	1924	1925	Weekly	LCCN sn90060932; OCLC 1716490	Available online
Minneapolis	Northwestern-Vine	1901	1905	Weekly	LCCN sn90060184; OCLC 1757651	Available online
Minneapolis	The Minneapolis Observer	1890	1891	Weekly	LCCN sn86058064; OCLC 13353485	Available online; Published by A.G. Plummer.
Minneapolis	Twin City Observer	1943	1976	Weekly	LCCN sn83016844; OCLC 1716569	Published by Milton Williams.
Minneapolis	The Protest	1892	1892	Weekly	LCCN sn90060335; OCLC 22368814	Available online
Saint Paul	St. Paul Recorder	1934	2000	Weekly	LCCN sn83016804; OCLC 1715473	Merged with Minneapolis Spokesman to become Minnesota Spokesman-Recorder.
Minneapolis	Minneapolis Spokesman	1934	2000	Weekly	LCCN sn83025247; OCLC 1715036	Followed by Minnesota Spokesman-Recorder.
Minneapolis	Minnesota Spokesman-Recorder	2000	current	Weekly	LCCN sn00058014; OCLC 43310423	Official site; Formed by the merger of Minneapolis Spokesman and St. Paul Recorder.
Minneapolis	The Twin City Star	1910	?	Weekly	LCCN sn90060427; OCLC 1767887	Available online; Published by Charles Sumner Smith.
Saint Paul	Summit University Free Press	1974	?	Monthly newspaper	LCCN sn90059631; OCLC 21893618, 3267065	Edited by Mazi Johnson.
Saint Paul	Saint Paul Sun	1941	1976	Weekly	LCCN sn84025909; OCLC 1714837	
Minneapolis	The Timely Digest	1931	1932	Monthly newspaper	OCLC 32479513	Edited by Cecil E. Newman.
Minneapolis	The World	1896	1897	Weekly	LCCN sn90059173; OCLC 1567082	Available online; Edited by A.G. Plummer. Published by P.O. Gray.; Also published in Duluth.

== See also ==
- List of African American newspapers and media outlets
- List of African American newspapers in Iowa
- List of African American newspapers in Wisconsin
- List of newspapers in Minnesota

== Works cited ==
- Danky, James Philip; Hady, Maureen E., eds. (1998). African-American newspapers and periodicals : a national bibliography. Harvard University Press. ISBN 9780674007888.
- Pride, Armistead Scott; Wilson, Clint C. (1997). A History of the Black Press. Howard University Press. ISBN 9780882581927.
- Smith, Jessie Carney (2012). Black Firsts: 4,000 Ground-Breaking and Pioneering Historical Events. Visible Ink Press. ISBN 9781578593699.
