= The Rising Son =

American newspaper (1896–1918)

The Rising Son (1896–1918) was a weekly newspaper published in Kansas City, Missouri. It served African Americans and covered local and national news. Lewis Wood edited it. It was purchased from Henry R. Graham by William T. Washington, a newspaperman with political aspirations, who used it to promote his career and an intense rivalry with Nelson C. Crews' Kansas City Sun newspaper developed.
