= List of African American newspapers in Illinois =

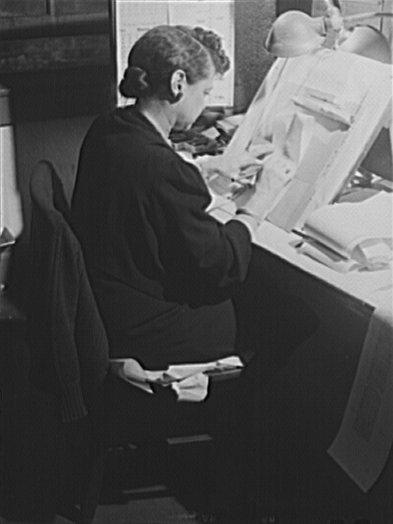
Copy editing the Chicago Defender in 1942.

This is a list of African American newspapers in Illinois. To be included, a newspaper should be attested in a reliable source as an African American newspaper published in Illinois. The list is divided by region, and the newspapers attested in each region are placed in alphabetic order by city.

Illinois' first African American newspaper was the Cairo Weekly Gazette, established in 1862. The first in Chicago was The Chicago Conservator, established in 1878. An estimated 190 Black newspapers had been founded in Illinois by 1975, and more have continued to be established in the decades since.

While most such newspapers in Illinois have been local, some like the Chicago-based Chicago Defender and Muhammad Speaks have had a major national circulation and impact. National Black newspaper networks, including the Defender syndicate and Associated Negro Press, have also been headquartered in Chicago.

== Northern Illinois ==
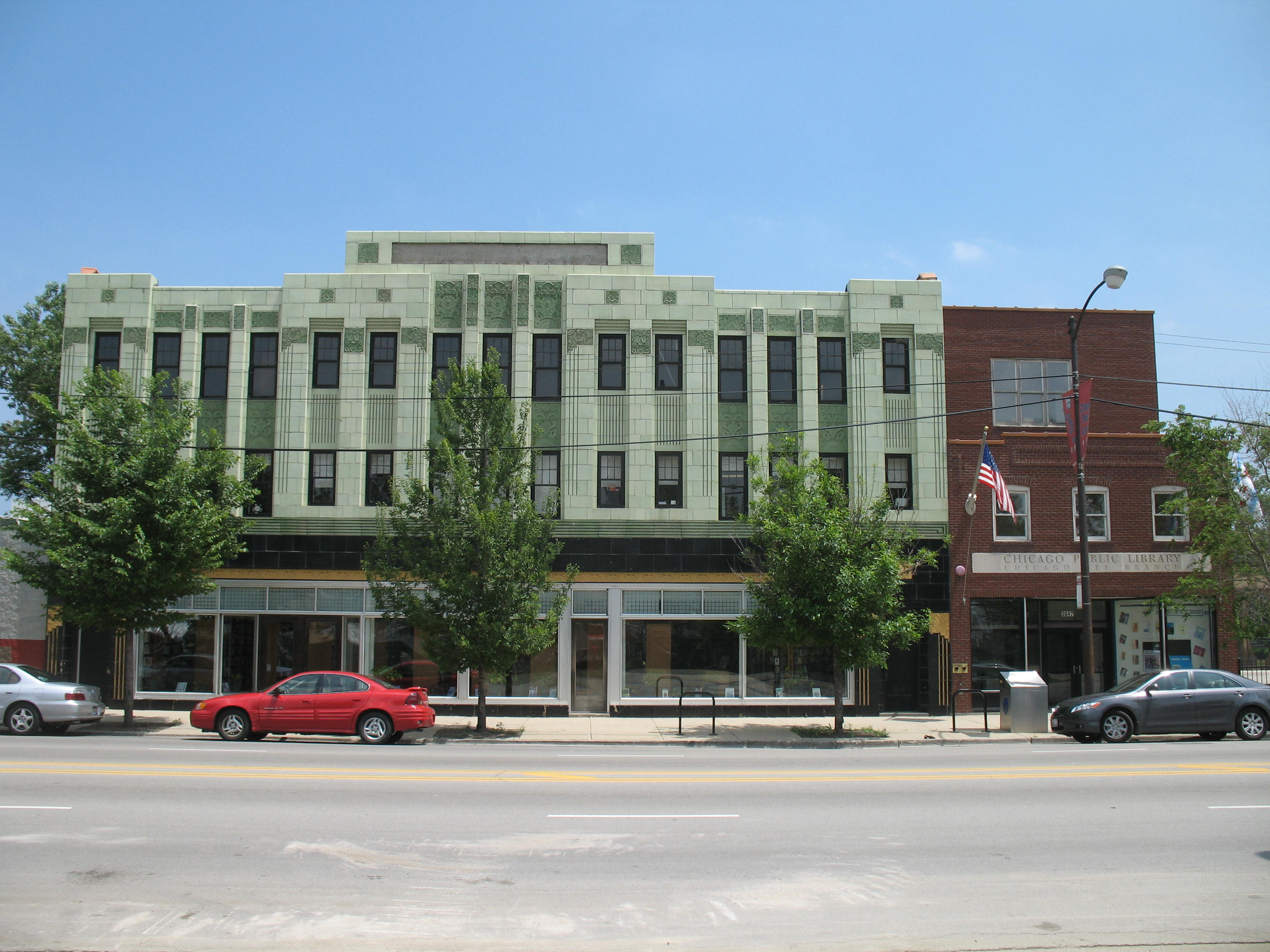
The Chicago Bee Building in Bronzeville, where the Chicago Bee was published.

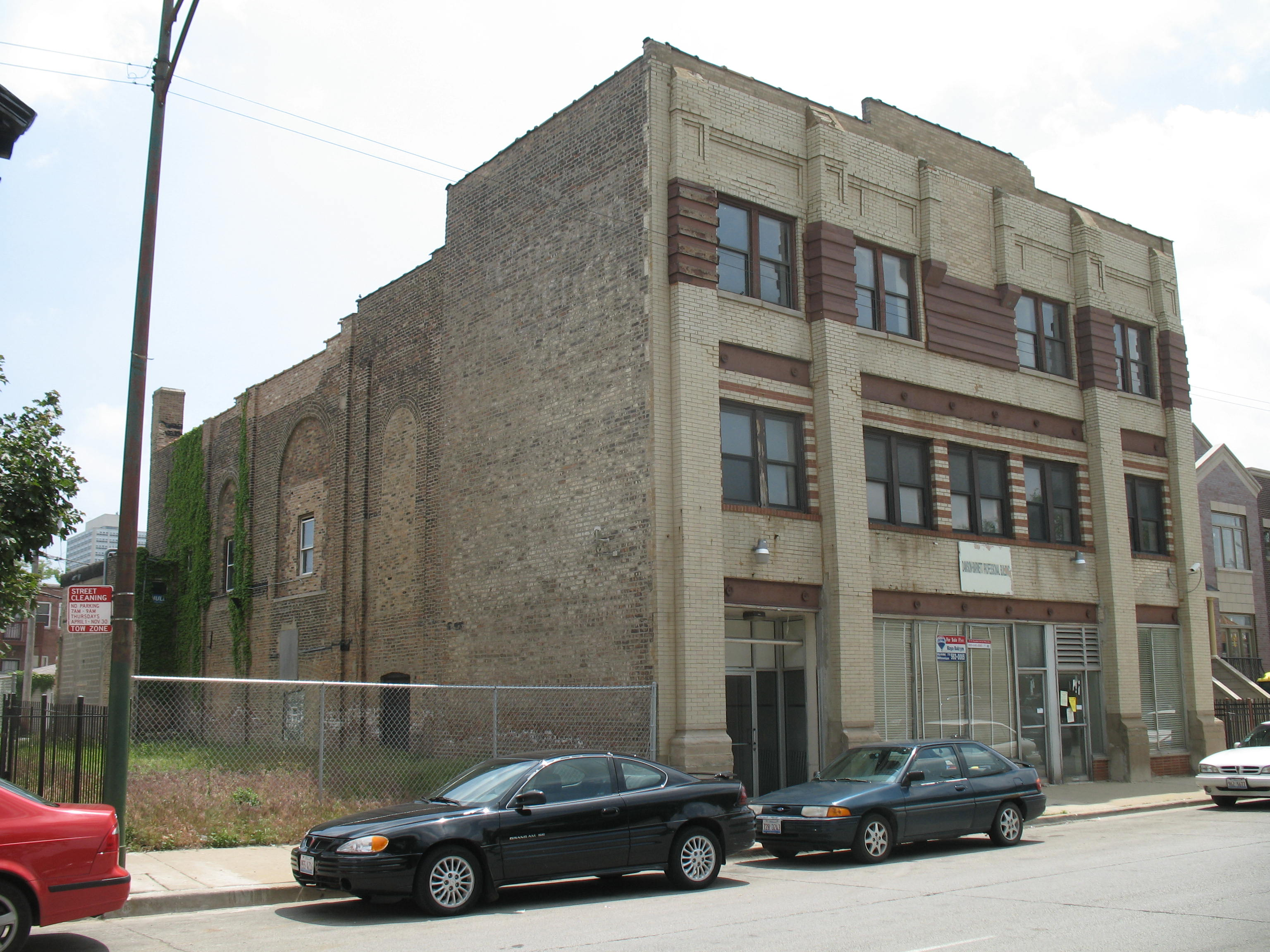
The Chicago Defender Building in Bronzeville, where the Chicago Defender was published until 1960.

Northern Illinois covers the northern third of Illinois, and is by far the most populous of Illinois' regions. Most of population is concentrated in the Chicago metropolitan area, and most of the region's African American newspapers have likewise been concentrated in and near Chicago.

City	Title	Beginning	End	Frequency	Call numbers	Remarks
Chicago	Abbott's Weekly & Illustrated News	1933	1934	Weekly		Published by Robert Sengstacke Abbott.
Chicago	Advance	1890	1900	Weekly		
Chicago	The Chicago Advocate	1905 (uncertain)	?	Weekly		
Chicago	African-American Voice / The Voice of the Black Community	1994 (uncertain)	?	Biweekly		
Chicago	All About Us	1896	1899	Weekly		
Chicago	All Chicago Focus	1990 (uncertain)	1991	Twice monthly		
Chicago	A.M.E. Record	1895	?	Weekly		
Chicago	Appeal	1885	1926 or 1923	Weekly		
Chicago	Aspect	1908	1908	Weekly		
Chicago (Austin)	The Austin Voice	1986	?	Biweekly		official site
Chicago (Austin)	The Austin Weekly News	1987	current	Weekly		official site
Chicago	The Chicago Bee and Sunday Bee	1925	1947	Weekly		Founded by Anthony Overton.
Chicago	Bee-Free Speech	1888	1895	Weekly		
Chicago	Black Truth	1968	1971 (or later) or 1970	Weekly		
Chicago	Black X-Press	1973	1970s	Weekly		Founded by Lu Palmer
Chicago	The Broad Ax	1895	1935	Weekly		Moved to Chicago in 1899; published from August 1895 to June 1899 in Salt Lake City, Utah.
Chicago	Brotherhood	1890	?	Weekly		
Chicago	Bronzeville	1943	?	Weekly		
Chicago	Bulletin	1958	1972	Weekly		
Chicago	Busy Bee	1896	?	Weekly		
Chicago (Chatham)	Chatham-Southeast Citizen / Chatham Citizen	1965	current	Weekly		Part of the Chicago Citizen Newspaper Group. Official site
Chicago	The Chicago Courier	1938		Weekly		Chicago affiliate of the Pittsburgh Courier
Chicago	Chicago Defender	1905	current	Weekly; daily from 1956 to 2008		Became online-only in 2019. Official site
Chicago	Christian Gibraltar	1910	1970	Weekly		
Chicago	Christian Science	1895	?	Weekly		
Chicago	Chronicle	1918	?	Weekly		
Chicago	Church Organ	1893	1898	Weekly		
Chicago	Church Record	1895	?	Weekly		
Chicago	Citizen	1965		Weekly		
Chicago	Clipper	1885	1898	Weekly		
Chicago	Conservator	1878	1914	Weekly		
Chicago	Courier	1932	1932	Weekly		
Chicago	Crusader	1937	?	Weekly		Distinct from the Chicago Crusader that was established 1940 as the New Crusader.
Chicago	New Crusader / The Chicago Crusader	1940	current	Weekly		Published by Balm Leavell until 1968 and subsequently by Dorothy Leavell. Official site
Chicago	Daily Times	?	?	Daily		
Chicago	Dynamite	1936 or 1937	1939	Weekly		
Chicago	Eagle	1889	1930	Weekly		
Chicago	East Side Monitor	?	?	Weekly		
Chicago	Egyptian Sun	?	?	Weekly		
Chicago	Enterprise	1918	1931	Weekly		
Chicago	Evening World	1919	1919	Daily		
Chicago	Fellowship Herald	1916	1916	Weekly		
Chicago	The Final Call	1979	current	Twice monthly		Official newspaper of the Nation of Islam. Official site
Chicago	Free Lance	1895	1926	Weekly		
Chicago	Free Speech	1888	1898	Weekly		
Chicago	Chicago Gazette	1880s?	1890s?			No copies extant.; Managing editor in 1893 was William Thomas Scott.
Chicago	The Chicago Gazette	1949 or 1950	current	Weekly		
Chicago	Globe; Chicago Globe	1950?		Weekly		Circulation of 35,000 in 1951.
Chicago	Hero	1889	1891	Weekly		
Chicago	Home Journal	?	?	Weekly		
Chicago	Home News	1925	1925	Weekly		
Chicago (Hyde Park)	Hyde Park Citizen	1988 (uncertain)	current	Weekly		Published by the Chicago Citizen Newspaper Group. Official site
Chicago	Idea	1900	1918	Weekly		Published by W.D. Neighbors.
Chicago	Illinois Chronicle	1900	1921	Weekly		
Chicago	Illinois Idea / The Chicago Illinois Idea / The Chicago Idea	1903	1922	Weekly		Published by S.B. Turner or "Mrs. S.B. Turner".
Chicago	Illinois Political News	1939 (uncertain)	?	Weekly		
Chicago	Chicago Independent Bulletin	1972 (uncertain)	?	Weekly		
Chicago	Inquirer	1926	1926	Weekly		
Chicago	Chicago Journal	1975 (uncertain)	?	Weekly		
Chicago (Lawndale)	Lawndale Drum	1970 or 1972	1979 (uncertain)	Weekly		
Chicago	Leader	1905	1906	Weekly		
Chicago	Messenger	1942	1944	Weekly		
Chicago	Chicago Metro News (1972–1991) / Chicago-South Suburban News (1968–1972) / South Suburban News (–1968)	1965	1991	Weekly		
Chicago	Metropolitan News (to 1938) / Metropolitan Post (to 1940)	1935	1940	Weekly		
Chicago	Mission Star	1890	?	Weekly		
Chicago / Moline	Modern Farmer	1930	1932	Monthly newspaper		Official publication of the National Federation of Colored Farmers. Published in other years at Nashville, Tennessee. Available online
Chicago	Monitor	1914	1915	Weekly		
Chicago	Muhammad Speaks	1961	1975	Weekly		
Chicago	National Aspect	1910	1912	Weekly		
Chicago	Negro Champion	1925	1929	Weekly		
Chicago	The Negro Spearhead	1968	?	Weekly		
Chicago	New Metro News	1992 (uncertain)	?	Weekly		
Chicago (South Side)	News Clarion / South Side News-Clarion	1964	?	Weekly		Founded by Chicago alderman Claude Holman.
Chicago	News Ledger	1938	1941	Weekly		
Chicago	News Scene	1984 (uncertain)		Twice monthly		
Chicago	Observer	1885	?	Weekly		
Chicago	The Chicago Observer	1964	?	Weekly		
Chicago	The Owl	1962	1960s	Weekly		
Chicago	Pathfinder	?	?	Weekly		
Chicago	People's Advocate	1900	1926	Weekly		Published by Oscar De Priest
Chicago	People's Voice	1918	1918	Weekly		
Chicago	Plain Dealer	1888	1922	Weekly		
Chicago	The Chicago Reflector	1895 or 1896	1906	Weekly		
Chicago	Republican	1888	1889	Weekly		
Chicago	Review	1929	1932	Weekly		
Chicago	Royal Messenger	1921	1932	Weekly		
Chicago	Savoyager	1929	1932	Weekly		
Chicago	Chicago Scene	1984 (uncertain)	1993	Weekly		
Chicago	Search Light or Searchlight	1910	1932	Weekly		
Chicago	The Chicago Shoreland News / Chicago Shoreland	1977 (uncertain)	?	Weekly		
Chicago	Smith's Arrow Weekly	?	?	Weekly		
Chicago	South End Citizen	1965 (uncertain)	current	Weekly		Published by Chicago Citizen Newspaper Group. Official site
Chicago	The South Shopper	1995	?	Monthly newspaper		
Chicago	South Side Bulletin: Chicago’s Progressive Community Weekly / Bulletin	1959 (uncertain)	1972	Weekly		Published by the Southtown Economist.
Chicago (South Side)	South Street Journal	1994 (uncertain)	2010s	Biweekly		
Chicago	South Suburban Citizen	1982 (uncertain)	current	Weekly		Published by Chicago Citizen Newspaper Group. Official site
Chicago	Southside Digest	1931	1931	Weekly		
Chicago	Spokesman	1932	1932	Weekly		
Chicago	Standard	1894	1895	Weekly		
Chicago	Star	1910	1946	Weekly		
Chicago	Sun	1924	1924	Weekly		
Chicago	Supreme Liberty Guardian	?	1938	Weekly or twice monthly		
Chicago	Today’s Chronicle	1992 or 1996		Biweekly		
Chicago	Voice	1910	?	Weekly		
Chicago	The Voice / Second Ward Voice / The First District Voice (1942)	1940	?	Weekly		Official newspaper of the Second Ward Regular Democratic Organization.
Chicago	Wednesday's Focus	1990	?	Weekly		
Chicago	Chicago Weekend	1974 (uncertain)		Weekly		Published by the Chicago Citizen Newspaper Group.
Chicago	Weekly Reporter	1906	1906	Weekly		
Chicago	West Side Torch	1969	1969	Weekly		
Chicago	Western Opinion	1906	1909	Weekly		
Chicago	The Chicago Whip	1919	1939	Weekly		
Chicago (West Side)	West Side Torch: The People's Paper	1965 (uncertain)	1971 (uncertain)	Biweekly		Published by the West Side Federation.
Chicago or Chicago Heights	Tri-City Journal	1978		Weekly		
Chicago	The Windy City Word	1992 (uncertain)	?	Weekly		
Chicago (Woodlawn)	Woodlawn Booster / Woodlawn Booster and Bulletin	1932	1973	Weekly		
Chicago	The Chicago World	1900	1902	Weekly		
Chicago	The Chicago World	1918	1953	Weekly		Circulation of 32,000 in 1951.
Chicago Heights	Chicago Standard News	1984	current	Weekly		
East Moline	The Common Bond	1975	?	Monthly newspaper		
Evanston	Evanston Guide	1929	1932	Weekly		
Evanston	Evanston Newsette	1941	?	Weekly		
Evanston	Evanston Weekly	1915	1931	Weekly		
Evanston	North Shore Examiner	1968 or 1971	1979	Weekly, later monthly or bimonthly		
Harvey	Chicago South Suburban News	1964 or 1966	1972	Weekly		
Harvey	Suburban Journal	1968		Weekly		
Hopkins Park (Pembroke Township)	Pembroke Herald Eagle	1961 or 1962	1983	Weekly		Published by Ozroe Bentley, remembered as "the conscience of a community."
Joliet	Voice or Negro Voice (1966)	1950	?	Weekly		
Kankakee	Progressive Era	1924	1942	Weekly		
Maywood	Suburban Echo-Reporter	1964	?	Weekly		
Robbins	Herald	1917	1950	Weekly		Circulation of 3,800.
Robbins	Informer	1947 or 1948	1949	Weekly		
Rockford	Crusader	1950	1972	Weekly		
Rockford	Vital Force	1985	2000s	Weekly		Published by George Anne Duckett.
Rock Island	Tri City Oracle	1898	1900	Weekly		
South Holland	South Suburban Journal	1975 (uncertain)	?	Weekly		
Waukegan	North Shore Guardian	1964	?	Weekly		

== Central Illinois ==
Central Illinois is the middle third of the state. It includes the state capital Springfield and many other small cities such as Bloomington-Normal, Champaign-Urbana, Danville, Decatur, Galesburg and Peoria.

City	Title	Beginning	End	Frequency	Call numbers	Remarks
Bloomington	American Pilot	1896	1899	Weekly		Published by A.M.E. minister and attorney Henry Washington Jameson.
Bloomington	Cooperative News	1933	1938	Weekly		
Champaign	Illinois Times	1941	1971	Weekly		Not to be confused with the Illinois Times of Springfield, an alternative weekly established in 1975.
Champaign	Plain Truth	1967	1969	Weekly		"[T]he first black power publication in Champaign-Urbana"
Danville	The Black Vanguard: for Unity in the Black Community	1968	?	Weekly or irregular		
Danville	Illinois Times	1939	1941	Weekly		Not to be confused with the Illinois Times of Springfield, an alternative weekly established in 1975.
Danville	International	1901	1902	Weekly		
Danville	Inter-State Echo	1909	1920	Weekly		
Decatur	Advance Citizen	1892	1932	Weekly		
Decatur	The Voice / African-American Voice / Voice of the Black Community	1967	?	Weekly		Publisher Horace Livingston, Jr., is the subject of a sculpture by Preston Eugene Jackson at Decatur's Mueller Park. The Voice also produced Bloomington, Peoria and Springfield editions.
Galesburg	Western Herald	1884	1885	Weekly		
Galesburg	The Illinois Star	1935	1941?	Weekly		Available online
Litchfield	Afro-American Advocate	1892	1893	Weekly		At its founding, the Afro-American Advocate was the only African American newspaper in Illinois supporting the Democratic Party.
Peoria	Advance Citizen	1892	1932	Weekly		
Peoria	Black Rapper	1968	1970	Weekly		
Peoria	Bronze Informer	1945	1946	Weekly		
Peoria	Bronze Peoria Herald	1964	1968	Weekly		
Peoria	Forum	1906	1915	Weekly		
Peoria	Informer	1934	1939	Weekly		
Peoria	Peoria Whirlwind	1962	1970s	Weekly		
Peoria	Spectator	1955	1955	Weekly		
Peoria	Traveler Weekly	1968	1970s	Weekly		
Peoria	Weekly Enterprise	1952	1952	Weekly		
Quincy	Advocate	1906	?	Weekly		
Quincy	Illinois Informer	1919 (uncertain)	1926	Weekly		
Quincy	Illinois Progress	1892	1900	Weekly		
Springfield	Advance Citizen	1892	1932	Weekly		
Springfield	Argus	1913	1915	Weekly		
Springfield	Capital City Courier	2005 or 2006	current	Monthly newspaper		Official site
Springfield	Capitol City News	1942	1951	Weekly		
Springfield	Chronicle	1917	1917	Weekly		
Springfield	Community Echo	1950s	?			Published by Lottie Bridgewater.
Springfield	Eye	1890	1893	Weekly		
Springfield	Forum	1904	1927	Weekly		
Springfield	Illinois Chronicle	1912 or 1917	1969	Weekly or twice-monthly		Circulation of 1,200 in 1951.
Springfield	Illinois Conservator / Conservator-Globe	1902 or 1905	1950 or after 1956	Weekly or twice monthly		Published by Elmer Lee Rogers. Remembered for its strong advocacy in the aftermath of the Springfield race riot of 1908.; Circulation of 3,500 in 1951.
Springfield	Illinois Record	1897	1899	Weekly		
Springfield	Illinois State Informer	1935	?	Weekly		Founded by Dr. Alonzo Kenniebrew. Continued through at least 1938.
Springfield	Illinois State Messenger	1897	1900	Weekly		
Springfield	Leader	1902	1918	Weekly		
Springfield	Messenger	1888	1889	Weekly		
Springfield	National Standard Enterprise	1894	1903	Weekly		
Springfield	Negro Democrat	1934	1936	Weekly		
Springfield	PURE NEWS USA	1983	current	Monthly newspaper		National circulation.; Official site
Springfield	Spirit of Black Springfield	1968	1968	Weekly		
Springfield	Springfield's Voice	1973	current	Weekly		official site
Springfield	The State Capital	1886	1915 or 1910	Weekly		Edited in early 1890s by Sheadrick Bond Turner. In 1891 Irvine Garland Penn judged The State Capital the "leading organ of the race, west of the Ohio River". Available online
Springfield	Voice of the Black Community	1972 or 1973	2000	Weekly		Springfield edition of the Decatur Voice.

== Southern Illinois ==
Southern Illinois or "Little Egypt" is the southern third of Illinois, and is the state's least populous region. Much of the population is concentrated in Metro East, a five-county region across the Mississippi River from St. Louis, Missouri. The state's first African American newspaper was established in Southern Illinois' southernmost town, Cairo, in 1862.

City	Title	Beginning	End	Frequency	Call numbers	Remarks
Alton	Advance Citizen	1892	1932	Weekly		One of a chain of five Advance Citizen papers published across central Illinois from 1892 to 1932 by Harvey T. Bowman.
Brooklyn	Monitor	1886	19th century	Weekly		
Cairo	American	1905	1906	Weekly		
Cairo	Baptist Truth	1894	1924	Weekly		
Cairo	Illinois Messenger	1925	1933	Weekly		
Cairo	Cairo News / United Front News	1971 (uncertain)	?	Weekly		Edited by Preston Ewing. Key vehicle for disseminating information during the fight against discrimination in Cairo.
Cairo	Sentinel	1890	1895	Weekly		
Cairo	Three States	1881	1883	Weekly		
Cairo	Weekly Gazette	1862	1890	Weekly / Daily (1882)		First African American newspaper in Illinois. 1882 daily edition was first daily African American newspaper in the United States. Published by William S. Scott.
East St. Louis	Advance Citizen	1892	1932	Weekly		
East St. Louis	Beacon	1960s	?	Weekly		
East St. Louis	The Crusader	1941 or 1943	?	Weekly		Circulation of 7000 in 1966.
East St. Louis	East Side Monitor	1970	1970s	Weekly		
East St. Louis	Empire Weekly News	1960s	1970s	Weekly		
East St. Louis	Forum	1928	1929	Weekly		
East St. Louis	Monitor	1962 or 1963	current	Weekly		official site
East St. Louis	Negro Democrat / Spotlight	1933	?	Weekly		Official newspaper of the Downstate Negro Democratic League. Extant through at least 1942.
East St. Louis	Sentinel	1904	1909	Weekly		
East St. Louis	Southern Illinois Press	1922	1924	Weekly		
East St. Louis	Tri State Tribune	?	?	Weekly		
Metropolis	Christian Anchor	?	?	Weekly; monthly in 1912		Religious topics
Metropolis	The Metropolis Gazette / Metropolis Weekly Gazette	1897 or 1898	1938	Weekly		
Mound City	Egyptian Sun	1924	1940	Weekly		
Mound City	Star	1908	1925	Weekly		

== See also ==
- History of African Americans in Chicago
- List of African American newspapers and media outlets
- List of African American newspapers in Iowa
- List of African American newspapers in Indiana
- List of African American newspapers in Missouri
- List of African American newspapers in Wisconsin

== Works cited ==
- Belles, A. Gilbert (September 1975). "The Black Press in Illinois". Journal of the Illinois State Historical Society. 68 (4): 344–352. JSTOR 40191030.
- Camara, Afi (2013). Pleading Our Own Cause: The Black Press in Springfield Illinois (1886-2013).
- Carroll, Fred (2017). Race News: Black Journalists and the Fight for Racial Justice in the Twentieth Century. University of Illinois Press. ISBN 9780252050091.
- Census Bureau (1938). "Negro Newspapers and Periodicals in the United States: 1937". Negro Statistical Bulletin, Issues 1-17.
- Danky, James Philip; Hady, Maureen E., eds. (1998). African-American newspapers and periodicals : a national bibliography. Harvard University Press. ISBN 9780674007888.
- Dolinar, Brian (2013). The Negro in Illinois: The WPA Papers. University of Illinois Press. ISBN 9780252094958.
- Lochard, Metz T. P. (Autumn 1963). "The Negro Press in Illinois". Journal of the Illinois State Historical Society. 56 (3): 570–591. JSTOR 40190627.
- Mansberger, Floyd; Stratton, Christopher (2018). National Register of Historic Places Thematic Survey of Springfield's African-American Community, And the Central East Neighborhood, Springfield, Illinois (PDF).
- Mouser, Bruce L. (2014). A Black Gambler's World of Liquor, Vice, and Presidential Politics: William Thomas Scott of Illinois, 1839–1917. ISBN 9780299301842.
- Smith, Jessie Carney; Horton, Carrell Peterson, eds. (1995). Historical Statistics of Black America: Media to Vital Statistics. Gale Research. ISBN 0810393921.
- Walker, Juliet E.K. (1996). "The Promised Land: The Chicago Defender and the Black Press in Illinois, 1862-1970". In Suggs, Henry Lewis (ed.). The Black Press in the Middle West, 1865-1985. Greenwood Press. ISBN 9780313255793.
