= Mattiebelle Woods =

African American Journalist

Mattiebelle Woods (October 31, 1902 – February 17, 2005) was an African American journalist. Dubbed "the first lady of Milwaukee's black press," she is most known for her column "The Party Line" in the Milwaukee Courier. She worked for the paper for over 40 years, from 1964 to her death in 2005 at the age of 102.

== Career ==
Woods was born on October 31, 1902, to Ira and Anniebelle Woods. Her family moved to Milwaukee when she was three, relocating from Louisville, Kentucky. She attended West Division High School. In her high school years, she became involved with Milwaukee's black community, which led her to develop an interest in journalism.

Woods began working for the Milwaukee Courier in 1964. Before then, she worked with various papers such as Milwaukee Defender, Milwaukee Star, Chicago Defender, and the Milwaukee Globe. She also did freelance work with Ebony and Jet magazines. Her column "The Party Line" covered social news and events of Milwaukee's African American community.

Woods worked on the paper for 41 years, and she continued to write the column until the week of her death. She died on February 17, 2005, at the age of 102. She was among the nation's oldest working reporters.

On her birthday in 2011, a ceremony was held in Milwaukee to dedicate a street in her honor.

== Personal life ==
Woods married twice. Her first marriage ended when her husband was killed in a car accident, and the second ended in divorce. She had one daughter.
