= Rufus Logan =

American newspaper editor

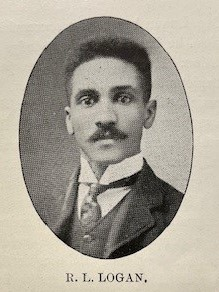
Rufus Logan as depicted in a 1906 book entitled “ What Graduates of Lincoln University Are Doing”

Rufus Logan was the editor of The Professional World, a newspaper for African Americans established in Columbia, Missouri in 1901. It was published until about 1921. Anderson Logan was his father.

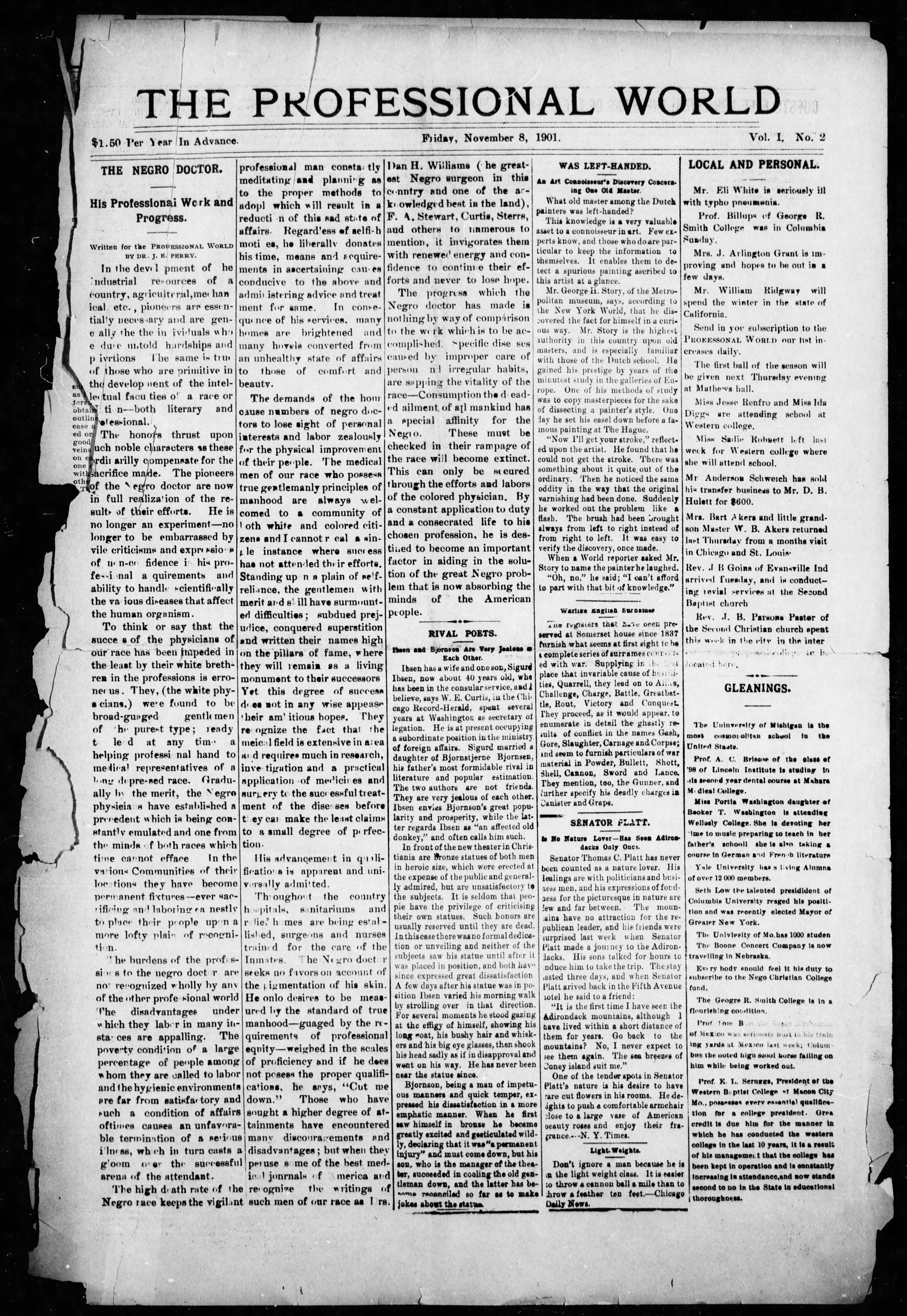
The Professional World - November 8, 1901, Volume 1; Issue 2

Logan was described as being from Jefferson City, having "considerable" teaching and writing experience, and having been educated at Lincoln Institute.

Columbia was at least a third African American during the early 20th century. Logan advocated for the establishment of black businesses in the area.

Logan and his paper had a rivalry with the St. Louis Palladium and its editor John W. Wheeler.

The paper covered career advancements of black professionals, black businesses, and events such as a visit by Booker T. Washington and a Blind Boone concert. The Professional World lasted until about 1920.

In 1921, Logan was appointed to the Board of Curators of Lincoln University. He was involved in the controversial reappointment of the university's president Inman E. Page.

Logan was critical of John W. Wheeler's St. Louis Palladium newspaper. Logan ran an unsigned editorial in the World that said the Palladium was "filled with whiskey and wine room ads., and has no regard for the truth." The editorial took exception to Wheeler's calling the editor of a third African-American newspaper, the American Eagle, an "old black man."

Such references are disgraceful to the editorial profession and no respectable editor would make use of such. But this is characteristic of the Palladium, and, the worst of all, this bulldozing editor has "Rev." before his name. . . . The Palladium never contains an editorial, but this is easily accounted for as it takes something more than a lead pencil and a tablet to produce an editorial (intelligence) and this is something the Palladium has not.

The Library of Congress has issues of the paper.
