= Sheadrick Turner =

American politician (1869–1927)

Sheadrick Bond Turner
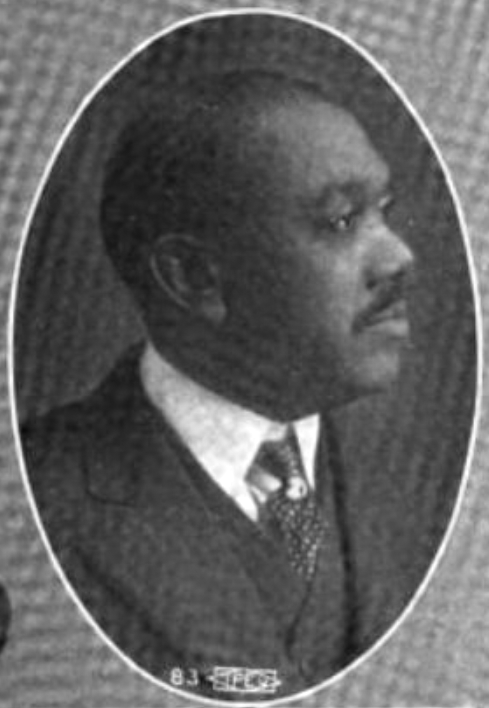

Member of the Illinois House of Representatives
- In office 1914–1916
- In office 1918 – September 30, 1927

Personal details
- Born: Sheadrick Bond Turner; July 12, 1869 West Feliciana Parish, Louisiana, U.S.
- Died: September 30, 1927 (aged 58) Chicago, Illinois, U.S.
- Party: Republican
- Education: University of Illinois College of Law
- Occupation: Lawyer, newspaper editor, politician

Sheadrick Bond Turner (July 12, 1869 – September 30, 1927) was an African American lawyer, newspaperman, and politician.

== Biography ==
Turner was born on July 12, 1869, in West Feliciana Parish, Louisiana. He was an African-American. Turner lived in Springfield, Illinois, from 1885 to 1889. Turner then moved to Chicago, Illinois. He went to high school and University of Illinois College of Law. Turner was admitted to the Illinois bar. Turner also was the publisher and editor of two weekly publications, The State Capital of Springfield and The Chicago Idea. Turner was a Republican. He served in the Illinois House of Representatives from 1915 to 1917 and from 1919 until his death in 1927.

Turner died on September 30, 1927, in a hospital in Chicago, Illinois, following surgery.

== See also ==
- List of African-American officeholders (1900–1959)
