= John W. Wheeler =

American journalist

John W. Wheeler

John W. Wheeler (c. 1846-1907 or after) was the editor of the St. Louis Palladium, an African-American-oriented newspaper printed in St. Louis, Missouri, from about 1884 until about 1911.

== Personal ==
Wheeler was a freeborn Kentucky native who in 1860 was living at the age of 14 with his parents, George M. Wheeler and Mary M. Wheeler, in Freedom Township, Lafayette County, Missouri. Five others listed by a census enumerator in the household ranged in age from 6 to 24.

Wheeler worked as a servant in the Union Army during the American Civil War. He lived in Indianapolis for a short time before moving to St. Louis in 1867 at the age of twenty, then worked in a tobacco warehouse as a clerk, rising to become a foreman. He went into business as a tobacco contractor, employing as many as thirty men.

Wheeler was married on December 24, 1869, to Hattie Hahn of Indianapolis.

In the 1880 census, Wheeler was listed twice: once as a 33-year-old mulatto who was a tobacco contractor and once as a black laborer. Both listings had him living on Franklin Avenue in St. Louis. He was married to Hattie Wheeler, age 37, and another resident was Mary Wheeler, age 17.

In 1900 he was living on Chestnut Street in St. Louis with Annie Wheeler, 31, and Hulda Nash, 48.

In July 1904, Wheeler was reportedly in a "street scuffle" with another man, who knocked him down.

In February 1907, Wheeler's foot was broken when he was attempting to board a streetcar at 16th Street and Franklin Avenue, St. Louis. He wrote in his newspaper:

The Easton avenue car seemed as if it would stop as it neared the crossing, and I attempted to board the car. Just as the car had reached the crossing and I had one foot on the step, the motorman turned on full speed, which caused me to slip and fall with my weight all upon my right foot. I was dragged about twenty feet.

The streetcar did not stop, and Wheeler was helped to his home by a passer-by. It was said that he would be confined there for "several weeks" and that during his absence his newspaper's affairs would be managed by Olivia Richardson.

== Career ==
Wheeler became a part-time Methodist minister in 1893, and occasionally led the congregation at St. Paul's Methodist Church and other churches in the St. Louis area. He ended his ministry when he took over the Palladium around 1897 but still called himself "the Political Preacher." He also referred to himself as the "Palladium Man."

We have always had the utmost confidence in the brotherhood of mankind, and when the humanity of man is touched, he will turn to the right.

— Wheeler

A Republican, Wheeler accepted appointments given him by Republican politicians. He was involved in "nearly every affair that concerned St. Louis African Americans," and it was said that he held the conservative views of Booker T. Washington in that African Americans should stand together, support black business, raise their moral standards, work with white allies and "not agitate the race question because agitation might make things worse."

He was involved in "practically every movement and issue that concerned black St. Louisans between the 1870s and the first decade of the twentieth century." Wheeler was "known for his self-promoting articles and his penchant for instigating public arguments with colleagues and community leaders." His newspaper was the official organ of two fraternal organizations — the United Brothers of Friendship and the Sisters of the Mysterious Ten.

Wheeler argued against a suggestion by a Missouri state senator that blacks should be settled in the newly conquered Philippine Islands. He wrote in the Palladium: "If the American Negro is wise, he will remain in the land of his birth. If he acknowledges himself incapable of sustaining the oppression he receives here, when the country has been settled for him, what will be his fate when transported to a country in which the only object is the 'struggle for existence'[?]"

Wheeler was active in resisting legislated racial segregation. In 1903, he was among African-Americans who gathered in the state capital to successfully lobby against a bill that would have set aside separate railroad cars for blacks throughout the state.

He was an alternate delegate to the 1900 Republican National Convention.

== St. Louis Palladium ==
It was said that "Through a mix of social commentary, moral instruction, gossip, and African American economic and political empowerment," Wheeler used the Palladium to shape opinion among blacks and to "change white perception" of the race.

The Sedalia Weekly Conservator referred to him as a "courageous editor" in August 1904.

According to an unpublished 1969 dissertation by George Everett Slavens, "A History of the Missouri Negro Press," the Palladium "disappeared" in 1911.

The Professional World, a newspaper in Columbia, Missouri edited by Rufus L. Logan, was critical of Wheeler and of his paper. An unsigned World editorial said the Palladium was "filled with whiskey and wine room ads., and has no regard for the truth." The editorial took exception to Wheeler's calling the editor of a third African-American newspaper, the American Eagle, an "old black man."

Such references are disgraceful to the editorial profession and no respectable editor would make use of such. But this is characteristic of the Palladium, and, the worst of all, this bulldozing editor has "Rev." before his name. . . . The Palladium never contains an editorial, but this is easily accounted for as it takes something more than a lead pencil and a tablet to produce an editorial (intelligence) and this is something the Palladium has not.
