= List of African American newspapers in Iowa =

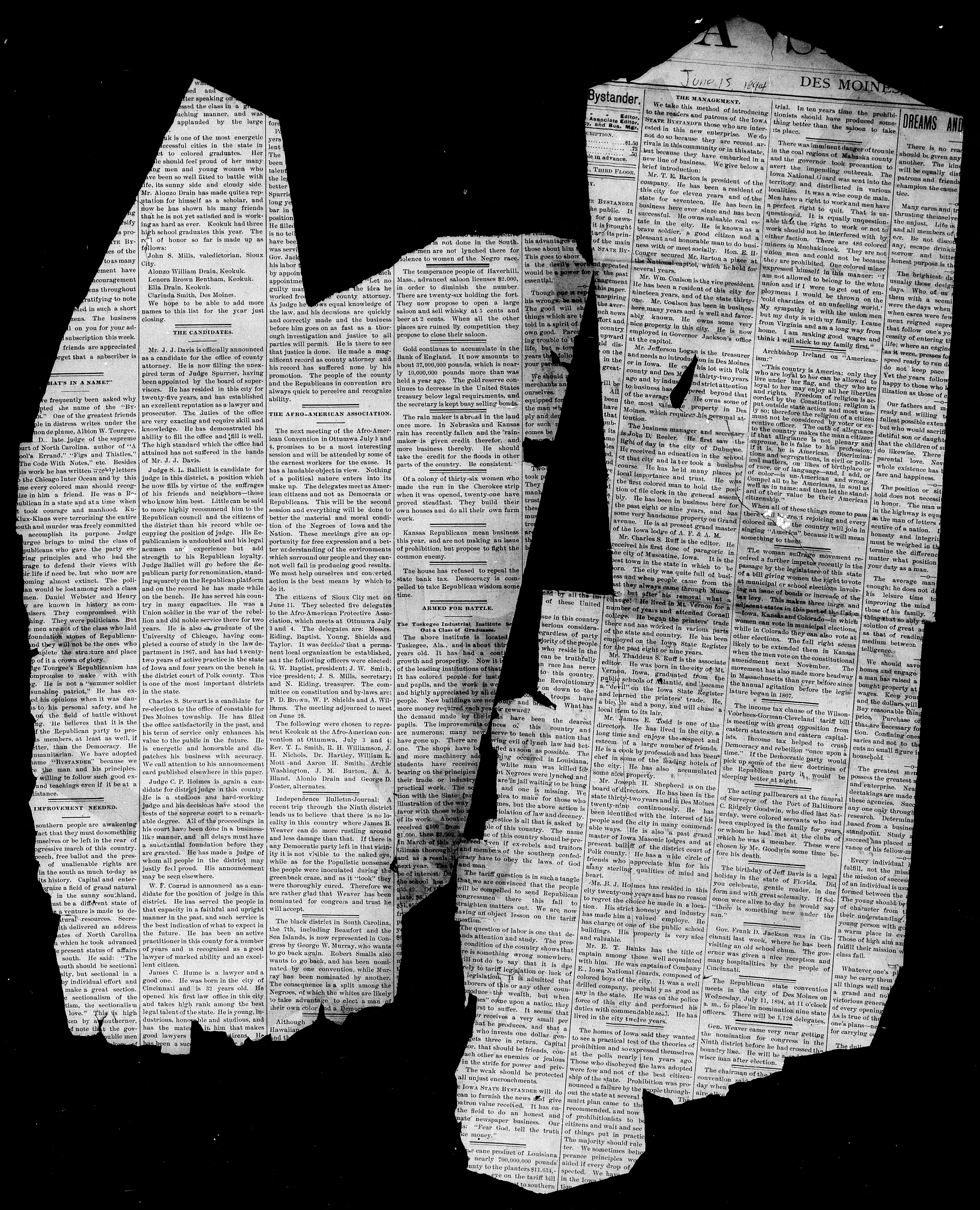
Fragments of the first issue of the Iowa Bystander, from 1894

This is a list of African American newspapers that have been published in Iowa.

The first African American newspaper in Iowa was the Colored Advance of Corning, Iowa, founded in 1882. It was followed the next year by the Des Moines Rising Son. By far the longest-lasting, however, was the Iowa Bystander, which spanned more than a century.

During the peak period of African American newspaper founding in the late 19th and early 20th centuries, the African American population in Iowa was less than 20,000. As a result, the number of such papers established in Iowa is much lower than in some neighboring states such as Illinois.

A hotspot of African American newspaper publishing in the early 20th century was Buxton, a coal-mining town that no longer exists. Around eight African American newspapers were published there in the first decades of the 20th century.

== Newspapers ==
| City | Title | Beginning | End | Frequency | Call numbers | Remarks |
|---|---|---|---|---|---|---|
| Buxton | Buxton Advocate | 1911 | 1912 | Weekly | | |
| Buxton | Buxton Breeze | ? | ? | | | |
| Buxton | Buxton Bulletin | 1914 | 1916 | | | |
| Buxton | Iowa Colored Worker | 1907 | 1910` | | | |
| Buxton | The Buxton Eagle | 1903 | 1905 | Weekly | | |
| Buxton | Buxton Gazette | 1903 | 1909 | Weekly | | Buxton's "most successful and respected weekly." |
| Buxton | Buxton Leader | 1912 | 1913 | Weekly | | |
| Buxton | The Vindicator | 1908 | ? | | | |
| Corning | Colored Advance | 1882 | ? | Twice monthly | | First African American newspaper in Iowa. |
| Davenport | Cash Register | 1980s | | Weekly | | "probably a weekly shopper" |
| Davenport | Tri-City Advocate | 1907 | ? | | | |
| Davenport | Tri-City Observer | 1940 | ? | | | |
| Des Moines | Weekly Advocate | 1891 | 1894 | Weekly | | |
| Des Moines | Iowa Afro-Citizen | 1976 | 1977 | Weekly | | |
| Des Moines | Afro Des Moines Communicator | 1978 | 1978? | | | |
| Des Moines | The Weekly Avalanche | 1891 | 1895 or 1894 | Weekly | | Official newspaper of the Afro-American Protective Association of Iowa. |
| Des Moines | Iowa Baptist Standard | 1897 | 1899 | Weekly | | |
| Des Moines | Black Des Moines | 1972 | 1972? | | | |
| Des Moines | Black Revolutionary | 1971 | ? | | | |
| Des Moines | The Iowa Bystander / Iowa State Bystander / Bystander | 1894 | 2015 | Weekly | | By far Iowa's longest-lasting African American newspaper, spanning over a century. Founded by "ten prominent black men who had migrated to Iowa during the 1870s." Some issues available online |
| Des Moines | Inner City Challenger / Challenger | 1981 | 1984 | Monthly newspaper | | |
| Des Moines and Buxton | Iowa Colored Woman | 1907 | 1909 or 1910 | Monthly | | Journal of the Iowa State Federation of Colored Women's Clubs. Moved from Des Moines to Buxton in 1909, but ceased publication later that year. |
| Des Moines | The Communicator: Iowa’s Leading Multicultural Newspaper | 1985 or 1986 | 2018? | Biweekly or bimonthly | | Edited by Jonathan R. Narcisse (1963–2018). Official site |
| Des Moines | Monitor | 1910 | | | | |
| Des Moines | Iowa Observer | 1936 or 1939 | 1949 | | | Founded by Charles Howard, Sr., after he grew unhappy with the policies of the Iowa Bystander. Circulation exceeded the Bystander by more than 1000 in the early 1940s. No copies are known to survive. |
| Des Moines | Des Moines Register and Leader | 1908 | 1915 | | | |
| Des Moines | Rising Son | 1883 | 1885 | Weekly | | Edited by Harry Graham, founder of the Western Negro Press Association. |
| Des Moines | Iowa Sepia News | 1951 | 1952 or 1954 | | | |
| Des Moines | They Say | 1936 | | Weekly | | Founded by Charles Howard, Jr., while a high school student. |
| Des Moines | Western Ledger | 1908 | 1909 | Monthly newspaper | | Official newspaper of the Colored Co-operative League. |
| Keokuk | Baptist Herald | ? | 1901 | | | |
| Keokuk | Baptist Missionary | 1917 | | | | |
| Keokuk | Iowa State Citizen | 1897 | | | | |
| Keokuk | Western Baptist Herald | 1881 | 1885 | | | |
| Oskaloosa | Iowa District News | 1890 | 1891 | Monthly | | |
| Oskaloosa | Negro Solicitor | 1893 or 1895 | 1899 | | | "[T]he only black Democratic paper published in Iowa before the 1930s." |
| Oskaloosa | Gazette | 1896 | 1896 | | | |
| Ottumwa | New Era | 1901 | | | | |
| Sioux City | Silent Messenger | 1937 | 1938 | | | |
| Sioux City | Enterprise | 1936 | 1938 | | | |
| Sioux City | Weekly Review | 1928 | 1930 | | | |
| Sioux City | Afro-American Advance | 1908 | 1912 | Weekly | | |
| Sioux City | Searchlight | 1899 | 1902 | Weekly | | |
| Waterloo | The Defender / The Waterloo Defender | 1963 or 1966 | ? | Weekly | | Played central role in the fight against racial discrimination in Waterloo. Extant issues through 1979. |
| Waterloo | Observer | 1941 | | | | |
| Waterloo and Cedar Falls | Parker Tribune | 1980s | 1980s | | | |
| Waterloo | The Waterloo Post | 1952 | ? | Weekly | | Extant through 1953. |
| Waterloo | Special Delivery | 1987 | ? | | | |
| Waterloo | Star | 1950s | 1950s | Weekly | | |

== See also ==
- List of African American newspapers and media outlets
- List of African American newspapers in Illinois
- List of African American newspapers in Minnesota
- List of African American newspapers in Missouri
- List of African American newspapers in Nebraska

== Works cited ==
- Danky, James Philip; Hady, Maureen E., eds. (1998). African-American newspapers and periodicals : a national bibliography. Harvard University Press. ISBN 9780674007888.
- Jones, Allen W. (1996). "Equal Rights to All, Special Privileges to None: The Black Press in Iowa, 1882-1985". In Suggs, Henry Lewis (ed.). The Black Press in the Middle West, 1865-1985. ISBN 9780313255793.
- Junne, George H. (2000). Blacks in the American West and Beyond--America, Canada, and Mexico: A Selectively Annotated Bibliography. Greenwood Publishing Group. ISBN 9780313312083.
- Patterson, Elaine (1987). The Iowa Bystander : a history of the second 25 years (1920-1945) (MS thesis). Iowa State University.
