= Milwaukee Courier =

Weekly African-American newspaper based in Milwaukee

- Type: Weekly newspaper
- Owner: Civic Media
- Publisher: Jerrel Jones
- Editor: Roemel Brown
- Founded: June 27, 1964
- Headquarters: 2003 W Capitol Dr; Milwaukee, WI 53206-1939
- Circulation: 2,500
- ISSN: 0026-4350
- OCLC number: 4166496
- Website: Milwaukee Courier

The Milwaukee Courier is a weekly African-American newspaper based in Milwaukee, Wisconsin. It was founded in 1964 and is the state's oldest black-owned newspaper. The newspaper is owned by Civic Media, which also owns and operates the radio station WNOV, and formerly by Courier Communications, which owns The Madison Times which they acquired in 2014.

The paper's owner Jerrel Jones, who sits on the board of the Potawatomi Foundation, launched and funded a successful recall petition against then-Senator Gary George in 2003, over his opposition to a bill supporting the Potawatomi Hotel & Casino. The newspaper was also known for having a 102-year-old writer, Mattiebelle Woods, who wrote a social column for the newspaper.
