= The Madison Times =

Black newspaper in Madison, Wisconsin

- Founder(s): Betty Franklin-Hammonds
- Founded: April 1991; 34 years ago
- City: Madison, Wisconsin
- Readership: Minorities in Dane County
- Website: https://themadisontimes.themadent.com/

The Madison Times is a weekly African-American newspaper in Madison in the U.S. state of Wisconsin. Civil rights activist Betty Franklin-Hammonds established the paper in April 1991. It was initially a sister publication of the Milwaukee Times, which had bought the Wisconsin Free Press, a Black-focused paper that published sporadically in Madison in the 1980s. Hammonds stated that the paper operated separately within its first few months. Hammonds started the paper as a resource for the under-served African-American community; the paper soon expanded its focus to various minority communities. In 1992 the paper joined with WORT radio, WYOU community television, and the online service DANEnet to create the Neighborhood Network, to cover local news and serve local activists.

Following Hammonds' death at age 56 in 1999, her husband David became publisher, and remained majority owner. Jonathan Gramling, a "longtime friend and associate" of the Franklin-Hammonds family, took over as editor. Under Gramling's direction, the paper added more full color photography, and increased its event coverage. In 2002, amid a nationwide industry slump, the paper experienced financial challenges, prompting staffing cuts. David described the newspaper as a community-oriented enterprise, rather than a financial investment. The paper's circulation was about 8,500 in 2004.

Local politician and bureaucrat Ray Allen purchased the paper in 2005. Though Allen stated at the time that he did not plan significant personnel changes, Gramling, who had recently won a human rights award, announced his intention to leave the paper shortly after the acquisition.

Allen sold it to Courier Communications, the parent company of the Milwaukee Courier and WNOV-AM radio, in 2014. The two newspapers had been sharing editorial and advertising content for about a year prior to the sale; at the time of the acquisition, the two papers had a combined circulation of 55,000.
