= Nelson Caeser Crews =

American journalist

Nelson Caeser Crews (1866–1923) was an American public official, newspaper publisher, and community leader in Kansas City, Missouri. Kansas City newspaper The Rising Son lauded him along with other leading figures.

Crews' brother James was the first African American mail carrier in Kansas City.

A park square and tennis courts are named for him.
